= Twin Peaks: The Missing Pieces =

2014 compilation of extra scenes from Twin Peaks: Fire Walk with Me

- Cover of the Twin Peaks: The Entire Mystery box set (2014), for which The Missing Pieces was originally produced
- Directed by: David Lynch
- Written by: David Lynch; Robert Engels
- Based on: Twin Peaks by Mark Frost; David Lynch
- Produced by: Gregg Fienberg
- Starring: Sheryl Lee; Moira Kelly; David Bowie; Chris Isaak; Harry Dean Stanton; Mädchen Amick; Dana Ashbrook; Joan Chen; Warren Frost; Peggy Lipton; James Marshall; Everett McGill; Jack Nance; Michael Ontkean; Kimmy Robertson; Kiefer Sutherland; Ray Wise; Kyle MacLachlan
- Cinematography: Ron Garcia
- Edited by: David Lynch
- Music by: Angelo Badalamenti
- Production companies: Absurda; MK2 Diffusion
- Distributed by: CBS Home Entertainment; MK2 Diffusion
- Release date: July 16, 2014 (Vista Theatre)
- Running time: 91 minutes
- Country: United States
- Language: English

Twin Peaks: The Missing Pieces is a 2014 compilation of deleted and extended scenes from Twin Peaks: Fire Walk with Me, a 1992 psychological horror film directed by David Lynch and written by Lynch and Robert Engels. The scenes were not included in the early home video releases of Fire Walk with Me and remained under lock and key for over twenty years, although their content was generally known to the public via the Fire Walk with Me script.

When filming Fire Walk with Me, Lynch shot up to five hours of material but cut the film to two hours and fourteen minutes for its theatrical release, explaining that he wanted to focus the film on the story of Laura Palmer (Sheryl Lee). The deleted scenes principally concerned the FBI's investigation into the murder of Teresa Banks (Pamela Gidley), who shared a killer with Laura, and everyday interactions with characters from seasons one and two of the Twin Peaks television series (1990–91). The Missing Pieces restores characters who were entirely cut from Fire Walk with Me, such as Josie Packard (Joan Chen), Ed Hurley (Everett McGill), and Nadine Hurley (Wendy Robie), and adds material to characters whose participation was reduced in the final edit.

Although The Missing Pieces is loosely structured as a feature-length film and has a feature-length runtime, it is not a standalone story and omits expository and storyline material from Fire Walk with Me, meaning that familiarity with the original film is essential to understanding The Missing Pieces. It has generally been released as a special feature to home video releases of Fire Walk with Me, such as CBS Home Entertainment's Twin Peaks: The Entire Mystery and Twin Peaks: From Z to A and The Criterion Collection's Fire Walk with Me re-release.

== Summary ==
=== Deer Meadow Prologue ===
FBI Agents Sam Stanley and Chester Desmond question the owner of Hap's Diner about the recently murdered Teresa Banks, his former employee. The local sheriff unsuccessfully fights Desmond to stop him from moving Teresa's body to Portland for further analysis.

Special Agent Dale Cooper chitchats with his unseen secretary Diane. After Desmond disappears, Cooper debriefs Stanley.

In Argentina, Agent Phillip Jeffries abruptly vanishes. Several years later, he materializes in Gordon Cole's Philadelphia office and tells Cole, Cooper, and Albert Rosenfield about his vision of the spirit world.

=== The Last Seven Days of Laura Palmer ===
In Twin Peaks, cocaine-dealing high schoolers Bobby Briggs and Mike Nelson lament that they owe Leo Johnson $5,000 and are running low on product. Leo abuses his wife Shelly.

Laura Palmer is horrified to find pages ripped out of her secret diary. She borrows her mother Sarah's car on the pretext that she forgot to bring her books home. Sarah discovers the ruse and tells Laura that she does not need to lie to her.

At dinner, Leland Palmer eagerly anticipates a delegation of Norwegians, who are planning a major real estate deal with Leland's boss Benjamin Horne. (Note: As shown in the pilot of the TV series.) Leland teaches Laura and Sarah to introduce themselves in Norwegian. Laura and Sarah roar with laughter at Leland's antics.

Laura, who moonlights as a prostitute, sneaks out to exchange sex for drugs with a trucker. Teresa Banks, another prostitute, wonders why her client Leland backed out of a prearranged foursome. After deducing that Leland is Laura's father, she tries to blackmail him. (Note: As shown in Fire Walk with Me, Leland backed out of the foursome because Laura was one of the participants, and responds to Teresa's blackmail by murdering her.)

At the Double R Diner, Laura picks up the day's Meals on Wheels shipments, but backs out. (Note: As shown in Fire Walk with Me, two mysterious spirits waiting outside the diner give Laura a framed picture that guides her to the spirit world.)

After Laura expresses gloomy thoughts to Donna Hayward, Doc Hayward gives Laura a comforting message. (Note: As shown in Fire Walk with Me, Laura confides to Donna that she thinks the angels have deserted her. In The Missing Pieces, Doc tells Laura that "the angels will return, and when you see the one that's meant to help you, you will weep with joy.") Laura cheers up, but becomes icy after Leland asks her to come home. Donna's parents realize that something is wrong between Laura and Leland.

At home, Laura hears BOB's voice from the ceiling fan above the stairs, indicating he wants to possess her and "taste through [her] mouth." Laura refuses, but seems to enter a trance as she stares at the fan and a smile creeps across her face. Laura comes to when Sarah interrupts her asking where her sweater is, to which Laura replies that Sarah is wearing the sweater. Sarah begins crying and laments that "it's happening again." (Note: This comment likely refers to Sarah's memory loss in repeated instances of being drugged by Leland. As shown in Fire Walk with Me, Leland forces Sarah to drink drugged milk before he goes to Laura's bedroom as BOB.)

Laura, Donna, Jacques Renault, and their clients recklessly drive across the Canadian border to Jacques' nightclub. (Note: As shown in Fire Walk with Me, Jacques uses the nightclub as a base for his underground prostitution operation.) Donna refuses to take cocaine she is offered, and Laura angrily calls her a "downer."

Bobby, who just killed a man, (Note: As shown in Fire Walk with Me, Bobby and Laura met with one of Jacques Renault's drug contacts, who (it is implied) was actually a policeman conducting a sting operation. After the policeman pulled his gun on Bobby, Bobby shot him.) asks Laura to hide $10,000 for him. Laura needles Bobby about the shooting, exacerbating his guilt. To Bobby's dismay, the victim was carrying baby laxative and not cocaine.

Laura's possessive psychiatrist Dr. Lawrence Jacoby calls, demanding to know why he has not heard from Laura recently. Laura disgustedly replies that she has recorded audiotapes for him. He asks for a kiss, but she hangs up.

On the night of her death, Laura has an awkward dinner with Sarah and picks at her asparagus; (Note: As shown in the pilot of Twin Peaks, later that night Laura writes in her diary that she hates asparagus, and wonders if this means she will never grow up.) Leland is working late. Laura visits Bobby and is welcomed by Major Briggs, who is reading an apocalyptic vision from the Book of Revelation to his wife Betty. (Note: Revelation 11:3-5, 7, 14:19-20, & 15:1-2 (King James Version).) After returning home, Laura sneaks out. (Note: As shown in Fire Walk with Me, Jacques Renault summoned her to his forest cabin for sex, and Laura also wants to see her lover James Hurley one last time.) Leland sees her, but lets her leave. (Note: As shown in Fire Walk with Me, Leland follows her to Renault's hideout, kidnaps her, and kills her.)

As Leland kills Laura, the Log Lady hears Laura's screams.

=== Side characters ===
Pete Martell humorously defuses a complaint by customer Dell Mibbler, who says that Pete and Josie Packard's two-by-fours are not exactly two by four inches. After Dell rebuffs a straight answer, Pete argues that at Dell's bank a dollar is not worth what it used to be. Although the answer is absurd, Dell is satisfied.

Ed Hurley and Nadine Hurley stop by the Double R for coffee, but Nadine storms out after seeing Ed's ex-girlfriend (and secret lover) Norma Jennings working the counter. Ed returns to apologize to Norma, who is crying. Later, Ed and Norma spend a quiet evening together and talk about their situation.

Sheriff Truman and his deputies, Andy and Hawk, plan to catch a local drug dealer. Later, Andy, Truman, and Lucy chat at the sheriff's station.

=== Sequel material ===
In the Black Lodge, Dale Cooper speaks with the Man from Another Place.

While Annie Blackburn recovers from her ordeal with Windom Earle, a nurse steals her green ring, which Laura, Teresa, and Phillip Gerard have also worn.

Doc Hayward and Sheriff Truman hear Cooper's doppelgänger injure himself. The doppelgänger lies on the floor to await them. Doc encourages the doppelgänger to get bed rest, but he protests that he has not yet brushed his teeth.

== Cast ==
- Sheryl Lee as Laura Palmer
- Ray Wise as Leland Palmer
- Kyle MacLachlan as Special Agent Dale Cooper
- Mädchen Amick as Shelly Johnson
- Dana Ashbrook as Bobby Briggs
- Phoebe Augustine as Ronette Pulaski
- David Bowie as Special Agent Phillip Jeffries
- Joan Chen as Josie Packard
- Eric Da Re as Leo Johnson
- Don S. Davis as Major Garland Briggs
- Mary Jo Deschanel as Eileen Hayward
- Miguel Ferrer as Special Agent Albert Rosenfield
- Warren Frost as Dr. Will Hayward
- Pamela Gidley as Teresa Banks
- Harry Goaz as Deputy Sheriff Andy Brennan
- Heather Graham as Annie Blackburn
- Michael Horse as Deputy Sheriff Tommy "Hawk" Hill
- Chris Isaak as Special Agent Chester Desmond
- Moira Kelly as Donna Hayward
- Peggy Lipton as Norma Jennings
- David Lynch as Bureau Chief Gordon Cole
- James Marshall as James Hurley
- Everett McGill as Ed Hurley
- Jack Nance as Pete Martell
- Michael Ontkean as Sheriff Harry S. Truman
- Jürgen Prochnow as Woodsman
- Wendy Robie as Nadine Hurley
- Kimmy Robertson as Lucy Moran
- Harry Dean Stanton as Carl Rodd
- Charlotte Stewart as Betty Briggs
- Kiefer Sutherland as Special Agent Sam Stanley
- Russ Tamblyn as Dr. Lawrence Jacoby
- Lenny Von Dohlen as Harold Smith
- Grace Zabriskie as Sarah Palmer
- Frances Bay as Mrs. Tremond / Mrs. Chalfont
- Catherine E. Coulson as Margaret Lanterman / "The Log Lady"
- Michael J. Anderson as The Man from Another Place
- Frank Silva as Killer BOB
- Walter Olkewicz as Jacques Renault
- Al Strobel as Phillip Michael Gerard
- Gary Hershberger as Mike Nelson
- Andrea Hays as Heidi
- Carlton Lee Russell as the Jumping Man
- Calvin Lockhart as The Electrician
- Rick Aiello as Deputy Howard
- Gary Bullock as Sheriff Cable
- Chris Pedersen as Tommy
- Victor Rivers as Buck
- Ed Wright as Dell Mibbler

== Background ==
Lynch originally shot more than five hours of footage for Fire Walk with Me, which he edited to two hours and fourteen minutes. He explained that he wanted to focus the film on Laura Palmer, that the runtime was a concern, and that the deleted scenes "were too tangential to keep the main story progressing properly". However, he denied making the cuts (at least purely) for runtime reasons. He remarked that "it might be good sometime to do a longer version with these other things in, because a lot of the characters that are missing in the finished movie had been filmed. They're part of the picture, they're just not necessary for the main story."

Although editor Mary Sweeney said that Lynch would "love" if the deleted scenes were released, the unused footage went unreleased for over twenty years. Lynch suggested that the distributors that owned the home video rights to Fire Walk with Me could not agree with him on a price to edit, mix, and color grade the remaining footage.

The scenes remained under lock and key, but the shooting script was publicly accessible. The script provided fans a general sense of what Lynch cut from the final edit, including interactions between Agents Desmond, Stanley, and Cooper; a fight between Desmond and Deer Meadow Sheriff Cable; a lost and disoriented Agent Jeffries; a dinner where Leland entertains his family; conversations between Laura and BOB's disembodied voice; the revelation that the package of cocaine that Bobby steals from the deputy was actually baby laxative; and an extended version of the scene where Cooper's doppelgänger interacts with Truman and Doc Hayward.

During the twenty-two-year interval between Fire Walk with Me and The Missing Pieces, the deleted scenes became a frequent topic of discussion within the Twin Peaks fandom. Various commentators described them as the fandom's "Holy Grail". At various points, fans campaigned for distributors to release the scenes as a director's cut or as special features to a home video release.

== Development and release ==
In 2012, Lynch and Mark Frost secretly began developing a third season of Twin Peaks, which premiered in 2017. In January 2015, they delivered a version of the season three script to Showtime (the cable TV arm of Paramount, which owned the rights to Twin Peaks through Aaron Spelling Productions). While Lynch and Frost worked on the season three script, Lynch and Paramount's home video subsidiary CBS Home Entertainment agreed to release a box set combining the first two seasons of Twin Peaks with Fire Walk with Me. As part of the deal, Lynch produced The Missing Pieces as a special feature for the box set. Given the longstanding speculation about the deleted scenes, the never-before-seen material in The Missing Pieces was deemed the highlight of the re-release.

While promoting the box set, Lynch commented that "it was great going back into the world [of Twin Peaks] ... and living with the people again". The third season was still a secret at the time, but when asked about future Twin Peaks stories, Lynch teased that "you never say never".

To commemorate the box set, Paramount organized a special screening of The Missing Pieces at the Vista Theatre in Los Angeles on July 16, 2014. Lynch delivered a cryptic introduction about the beauty of wood. Three months later, Showtime announced the third season of Twin Peaks.

It was also released as bonus material on the Criterion Collection edition of Fire Walk with Me.

== Reception and legacy ==
=== Critical reception ===
Reviewers generally agreed that The Missing Pieces was not a standalone feature film, instead characterizing it as "a series of vignettes that capture stolen moments"; a "fragmented ... cluster of vignettes"; and a series of "dead ends, intriguing digressions, smart discards, and intriguing unused options". One writer said that the film "seemingly presumes we'll be watching with full knowledge of already-seen events".

Several reviewers noted that The Missing Pieces still adds to the Fire Walk with Me story, despite its fragmented nature. Jace Lacob (BuzzFeed) explained that the film eventually "coalesces into something" that "give[s] us a deeper portrait of Laura and those around her ... something alternately funny and heartbreaking, terrifying and uplifting". He added that the deleted scenes further showcased Sheryl Lee's "incredibly nuanced and powerful performance ... giv[ing] television's most famous dead girl a profound sense of vulnerability". Chuck Bowen (Slant Magazine) noted that The Missing Pieces specifically "underline[s] the town's willed obliviousness to Laura's misery".

However, critics cautioned that The Missing Pieces did not resolve any of the mysteries left by the second season's cliffhanger ending. Jonathan Eburne (Los Angeles Review of Books) noted that while the 2014 box set was "terrific ... it remains steadfast in its refusal to [resolve lingering questions about its characters' fates or the series' "otherworldly cosmology"]". Lacob agreed that the film did not "pull back the curtain on the larger mysteries of Twin Peaks".

=== Fan edits ===
In the years since The Missing Pieces was released, several bootleg fan edits have attempted to splice the deleted scenes into Fire Walk with Me to create a coherent whole.

== Sources ==
- Hughes, David (2001). The Complete Lynch. London: Virgin. ISBN 9780753505984.
- Lynch, David; McKenna, Kristine (2018). Room to Dream. New York: Random House. ISBN 9780399589195.
- Lynch, David; Rodley, Chris (1997). Lynch on Lynch. Faber and Faber. ISBN 0571178332.
