= 19th Saturn Awards =

US film and television award ceremony

- Date: June 8, 1993
- Site: California, U.S.

Highlights
- Most awards: Bram Stoker's Dracula (5)
- Most nominations: Bram Stoker's Dracula (10)

The 19th Saturn Awards, honoring the best in science fiction, fantasy and horror film and television in 1992, were held on June 8, 1993.

== Winners and nominees ==
Below is a complete list of nominees and winners. Winners are highlighted in bold.

=== Film ===
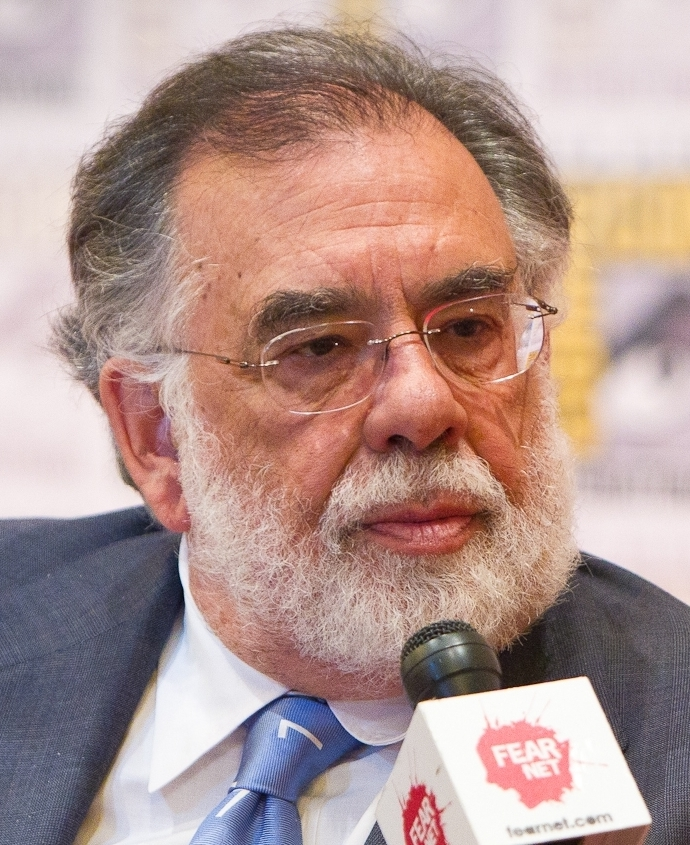
Francis Ford Coppola, Best Director winner

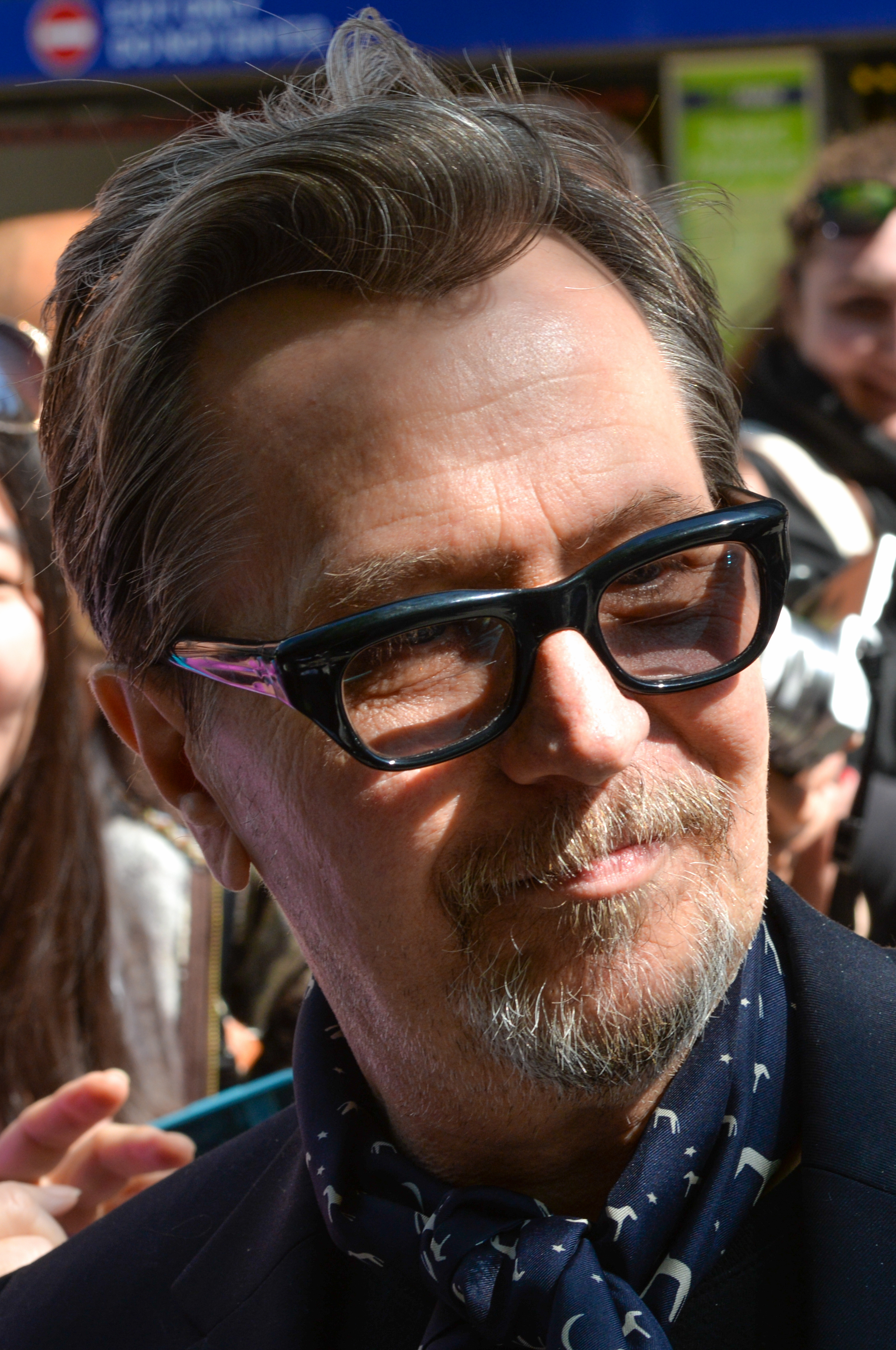
Gary Oldman, Best Actor winner

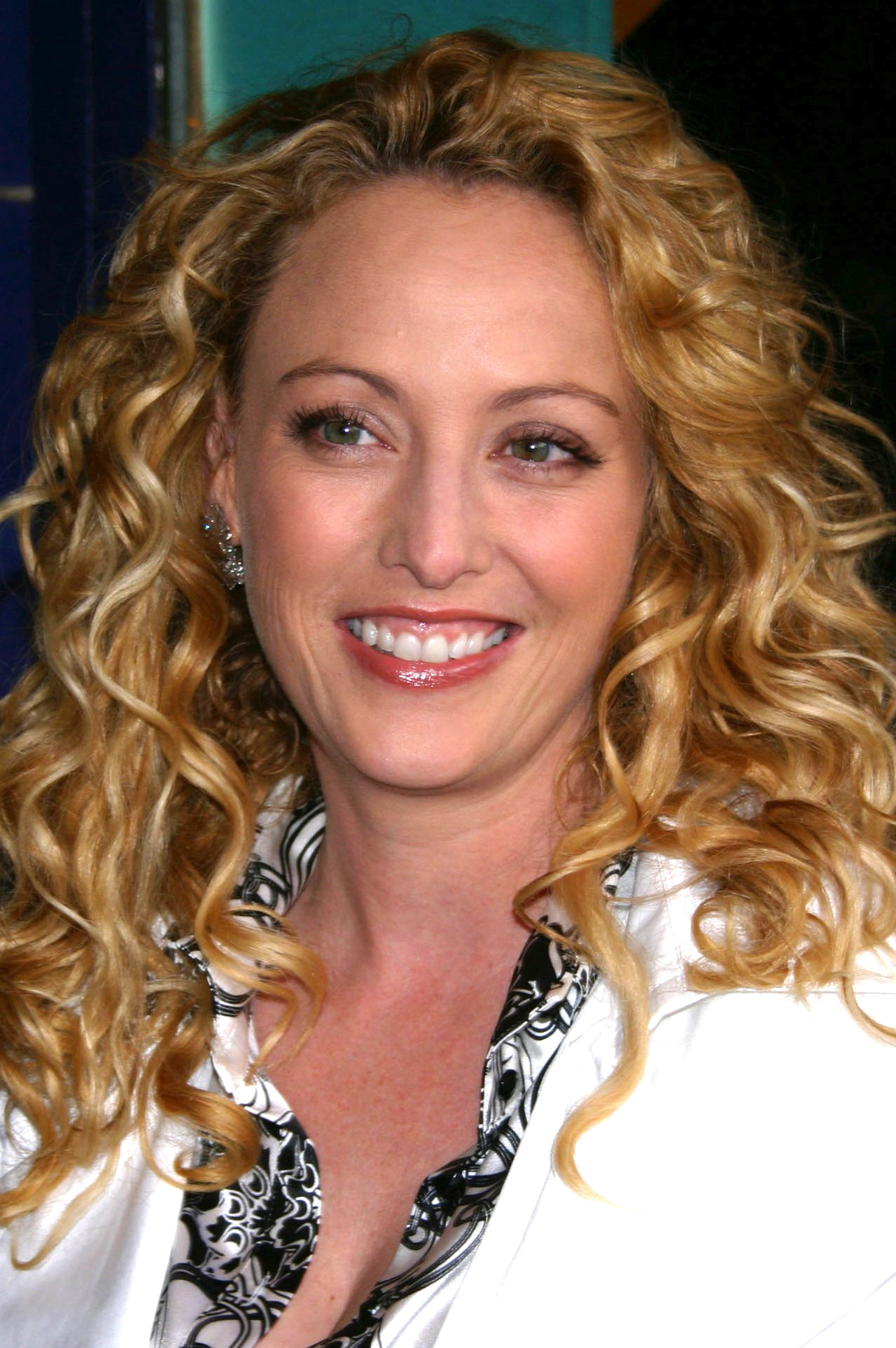
Virginia Madsen, Best Actress winner

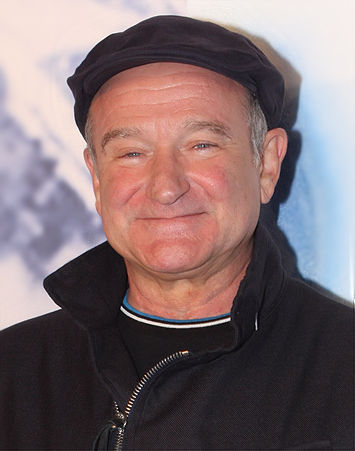
Robin Williams, Best Supporting Actor winner

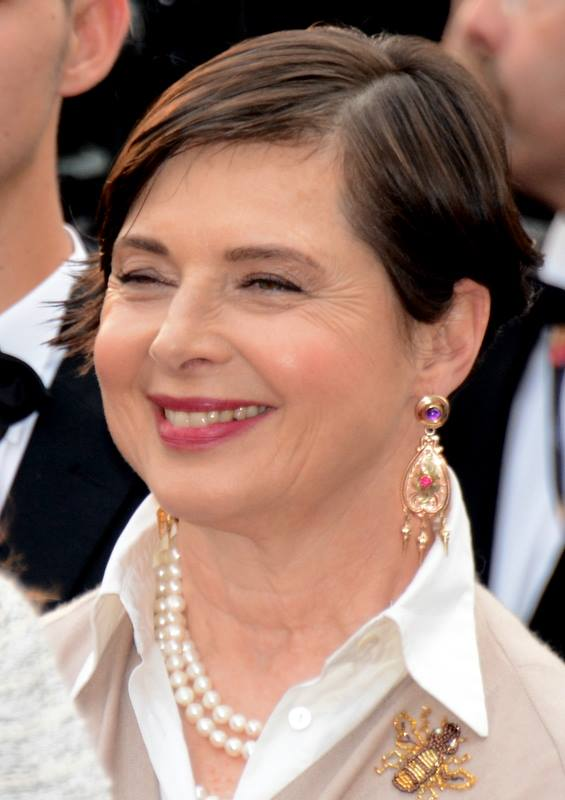
Isabella Rossellini, Best Supporting Actress winner

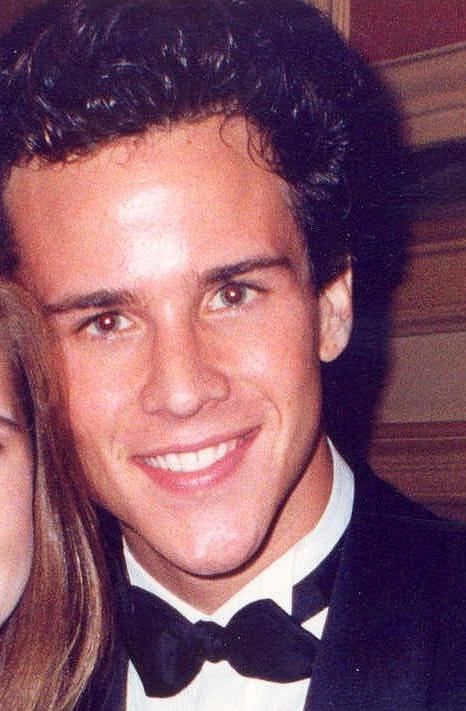
Scott Weinger, Best Performance by a Younger Actor winner

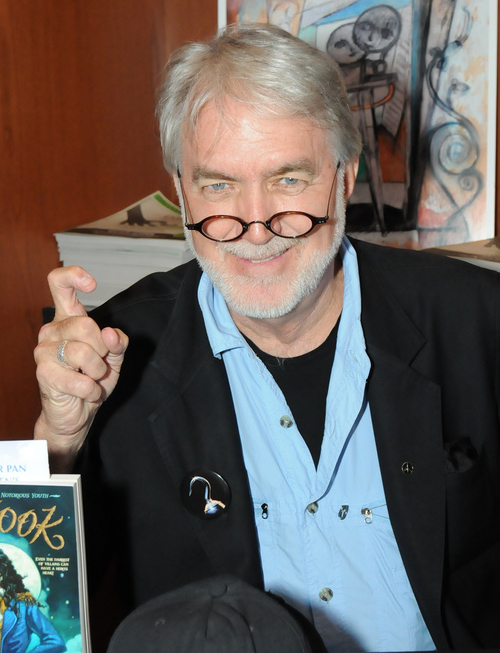
James V. Hart, Best Writing winner

Best Science Fiction Film	Best Fantasy Film
**Star Trek VI: The Undiscovered Country**; Alien 3; Freejack; Honey, I Blew Up the Kid; The Lawnmower Man; Memoirs of an Invisible Man	**Aladdin**; The Addams Family; Batman Returns; Beauty and the Beast; Death Becomes Her; Hook; Toys
Best Horror Film	Best Director
**Bram Stoker's Dracula**; Basic Instinct; Braindead; Candyman; The Hand That Rocks the Cradle; Hellraiser III: Hell on Earth; Twin Peaks: Fire Walk with Me	**Francis Ford Coppola – Bram Stoker's Dracula**; Tim Burton – Batman Returns; David Fincher – Alien 3; William Friedkin – Rampage; Randal Kleiser – Honey, I Blew Up the Kid; Paul Verhoeven – Basic Instinct; Robert Zemeckis – Death Becomes Her
Best Actor	Best Actress
**Gary Oldman – Bram Stoker's Dracula as Dracula / Vlad Dracula**; Chevy Chase – Memoirs of an Invisible Man as Nick Halloway; Michael Gambon – Toys as Lt. General Leland Zevo; Raul Julia – The Addams Family as Gomez Addams; John Lithgow – Raising Cain as Carter / Cain / Dr. Nix / Josh / Margo; Robin Williams – Toys as Leslie Zevo; Bruce Willis – Death Becomes Her as Dr. Ernest Menville	**Virginia Madsen – Candyman as Helen Lyle**; Rebecca De Mornay – The Hand That Rocks the Cradle as Mrs. Mott / Peyton Flanders; Sheryl Lee – Twin Peaks: Fire Walk with Me as Laura Palmer; Winona Ryder – Bram Stoker's Dracula as Mina Murray / Elisabeta; Sharon Stone – Basic Instinct as Catherine Tramell; Meryl Streep – Death Becomes Her as Madeline Ashton; Sigourney Weaver – Alien 3 as Ellen Ripley
Best Supporting Actor	Best Supporting Actress
**Robin Williams – Aladdin as Genie**; Danny DeVito – Batman Returns as Oswald Cobblepot / Penguin; Charles S. Dutton – Alien 3 as Leonard Dillon; Anthony Hopkins – Bram Stoker's Dracula as Professor Abraham Van Helsing; Sam Neill – Memoirs of an Invisible Man as David Jenkins; Kevin Spacey – Consenting Adults as Eddy Otis; Ray Wise – Twin Peaks: Fire Walk with Me as Leland Palmer	**Isabella Rossellini – Death Becomes Her as Lisle Von Rhuman**; Kim Cattrall – Star Trek VI: The Undiscovered Country as Lt. Valeris; Julianne Moore – The Hand That Rocks the Cradle as Marlene Craven; Rene Russo – Freejack as Julie Redlund; Frances Sternhagen – Raising Cain as Dr. Lynn Waldheim; Marcia Strassman – Honey, I Blew Up the Kid as Diane Szalinski; Robin Wright – Toys as Gwen Tyler
Best Performance by a Younger Actor	Best Writing
**Scott Weinger – Aladdin as Aladdin**; Brandon Adams – The People Under the Stairs as Poindexter "Fool" Williams; Edward Furlong – Pet Sematary Two as Jeff Matthews; Robert Oliveri – Honey, I Blew Up the Kid as Nick Szalinski; Christina Ricci – The Addams Family as Wednesday Addams; Daniel Shalikar – Honey, I Blew Up the Kid as Adam Szalinski; Joshua Shalikar – Honey, I Blew Up the Kid as Adam Szalinski	**James V. Hart – Bram Stoker's Dracula**; Martin Donovan and David Koepp – Death Becomes Her; Joe Eszterhas – Basic Instinct; David Giler, Walter Hill, and Larry Ferguson – Alien 3; David Lynch and Robert Engels – Twin Peaks: Fire Walk with Me; Nicholas Meyer and Denny Martin Flinn – Star Trek VI: The Undiscovered Country; Bernard Rose – Candyman
Best Music	Best Costumes
**Angelo Badalamenti – Twin Peaks: Fire Walk with Me**; Jerry Goldsmith – Basic Instinct; Wojciech Kilar – Bram Stoker's Dracula; Alan Menken – Aladdin; Alan Menken – Beauty and the Beast; Alan Silvestri – Death Becomes Her; Hans Zimmer and Trevor Horn – Toys	**Eiko Ishioka – Bram Stoker's Dracula**; Lisa Jensen – Freejack; Robyn Reichek – Mom and Dad Save the World; Bob Ringwood and David Perry – Alien 3; Bob Ringwood, Mary E. Vogt, and Vin Burnham – Batman Returns; Dodie Shepard – Star Trek VI: The Undiscovered Country; Albert Wolsky – Toys
Best Make-up	Best Special Effects
**Stan Winston and Ve Neill – Batman Returns**; Greg Cannom, Matthew W. Mungle, and Michèle Burke – Bram Stoker's Dracula; Steve Johnson – Highway to Hell; Bob Keen (Image Animation) – Candyman; Bob Keen – Hellraiser III: Hell on Earth; Michael Mills and Edward French – Star Trek VI: The Undiscovered Country; Dick Smith and Kevin Haney – Death Becomes Her	**Ken Ralston, Tom Woodruff Jr., and Alec Gillis (Industrial Light & Magic (ILM)) – Death Becomes Her**; Frank Ceglia, Paul Haines, and Tom Ceglia – The Lawnmower Man; Roman Coppola – Bram Stoker's Dracula; George Gibbs, Richard Edlund, Alec Gillis, and Tom Woodruff Jr. – Alien 3; Alan Munro (Visual Concept Engineering (VCE), Alterian, Inc., David Miller Creations) – The Addams Family; Bruce Nicholson and Ned Gorman (Industrial Light & Magic (ILM)) – Memoirs of an Invisible Man; Richard Taylor and Bob McCarron – Braindead

=== Television ===
Best Genre Television Series
- **The Simpsons (Fox)**
  - Batman: The Animated Series (Fox Kids)
  - Intruders (CBS)
  - Quantum Leap (NBC)
  - The Ren & Stimpy Show (Nickelodeon)
  - Star Trek: The Next Generation (Syndicated)
  - Tales from the Crypt (HBO)

=== Video ===
Best Genre Video Release
- **Killer!**
  - Drácula
  - Frankenweenie
  - Highway to Hell
  - Netherworld
  - Project Shadowchaser
  - Two Evil Eyes (Due occhi diabolici)

=== Special awards ===
George Pal Memorial Award

- Frank Marshall

Life Career Award

- David Lynch

President's Award

- Gale Anne Hurd

Service Award

- Alice La Deane
