= Twin Peaks: Fire Walk with Me =

1992 American film by David Lynch

- Theatrical release poster
- Directed by: David Lynch
- Written by: David Lynch; Robert Engels
- Based on: Twin Peaks by: Mark Frost; David Lynch
- Produced by: Gregg Fienberg
- Starring: Sheryl Lee; Moira Kelly; David Bowie; Chris Isaak; Harry Dean Stanton; Ray Wise; Kyle MacLachlan
- Cinematography: Ron Garcia
- Edited by: Mary Sweeney
- Music by: Angelo Badalamenti
- Production company: CIBY Pictures
- Distributed by: AMLF (France); New Line Cinema (United States)
- Release dates: May 16, 1992 (Cannes); July 3, 1992 (France); August 28, 1992 (United States)
- Running time: 134 minutes
- Countries: France; United States
- Language: English
- Budget: $10–12 million
- Box office: $4.2 million (North America)

Twin Peaks: Fire Walk with Me is a 1992 psychological horror film directed by David Lynch, and co-written by Lynch and Robert Engels. It serves as a prequel to seasons one and two of the television series Twin Peaks (1990–1991), created and produced by Mark Frost and Lynch. It begins with the FBI's investigation into the murder of Teresa Banks (Pamela Gidley) before shifting to the last seven days of the life of Laura Palmer (Sheryl Lee), a popular-but-troubled high school student in the fictional town of Twin Peaks, Washington, United States. Palmer's murder was the primary plot thread of the original TV series.

Greenlit shortly after the TV series was canceled, Fire Walk with Me has a much darker tone than the TV series and does not address many of season two's unfinished narratives, including its cliffhanger ending. Although most of the television cast reprised their roles for the film, many comparatively lighthearted scenes featuring town residents were cut. In addition, the series' main star, Kyle MacLachlan (Dale Cooper), asked for his role to be downsized, and Lara Flynn Boyle's character Donna Hayward was recast with Moira Kelly. In 2014, several deleted scenes were recut and released as a compilation film titled Twin Peaks: The Missing Pieces.

Fire Walk with Me premiered at the 1992 Cannes Film Festival in competition for the Palme d'Or. The film was notoriously polarizing: the American press generally panned the film. The film was controversial for its frank and vivid depiction of sexual abuse, its relative absence of fan-favorite characters, and its surrealistic style. It was a box-office bomb in North America, but fared better in Japan and France. Due to the poor reception, plans for a sequel were abandoned.

The film has been positively re-evaluated in the 21st century, and is now widely regarded as one of Lynch's major works. Lynch and Frost eventually received funding to produce a third season of the TV series in 2017, which revisited several plot threads from the film. In 2019, the British Film Institute ranked Fire Walk with Me the fourth-best film of the 1990s.

== Plot ==
=== Deer Meadow Prologue ===
A man smashes a television as a woman screams. (Note: This is later revealed to be the scene where Leland Palmer kills Teresa Banks.) In Deer Meadow, Washington, police discover the body of Teresa Banks. (Note: Teresa's body is discovered under similar conditions as Laura Palmer's body in the pilot of the TV series: floating down a river, wrapped in plastic, with a piece of paper lodged underneath one fingernail.) The FBI's Gordon Cole sends Agents Chester Desmond and Sam Stanley to investigate. Unlike the town of Twin Peaks, the locals are cold and unhelpful and the police are hostile. While searching Teresa's home, the agents see a photo of her wearing a strange ring, which has disappeared. Chester finds the ring, but he himself disappears.

At FBI regional headquarters in Philadelphia, Cole and Agents Dale Cooper and Albert Rosenfield are interrupted by the long-disappeared Agent Phillip Jeffries, who recounts a vision of mysterious spirits before vanishing. Cooper searches for Chester, but learns nothing.

=== The Last Seven Days of Laura Palmer ===
One year later, Laura Palmer juggles her double life. Popular and beautiful, she is Twin Peaks High School's homecoming queen. However, she is traumatized by Bob, a malevolent spirit who has been sexually abusing her since she was twelve. To fuel her cocaine addiction, she dates her drug dealer Bobby Briggs and moonlights as a prostitute. She also cheats on Bobby with James Hurley.

Laura finds that someone has ripped out her diary entries about Bob. She entrusts the diary to Harold Smith. (Note: Laura's diary is further discussed in episode 11 of the TV series.) At the Philadelphia headquarters, Cooper appears to have a premonition, offering a description of the next victim to a skeptical Albert that matches Laura. After two spirits from Jeffries' vision warn her that the "man behind the mask" is in her bedroom, Laura witnesses Bob searching her diary's usual hiding place. When she runs outside, she sees her father Leland instead of Bob, but does not want to believe Bob is her father. At dinner, Leland seems free of Bob's influence, but badgers Laura to tears. After dinner, he tearfully apologizes to Laura.

In a dream, Laura visits the Red Room and meets a future version of Cooper (Note: In episode 29 of the TV series, Cooper is trapped in the Red Room and is replaced on Earth by a doppelgänger possessed by Bob.) and The Man from Another Place, who cryptically calls himself "the arm". (Note: In episode 13 of the TV series, Bob's rival MIKE explains that he cut off his human host's arm to rid himself of Bob's influence.) The Man offers her Teresa's ring, but Cooper tells her to reject it. Annie Blackburn appears in her bed, neck slashed yet alive, and instructs her to write down that "the good Dale is in the Lodge and he can't leave." Laura travels to Canada with her pimp Jacques Renault and two clients. Her best friend, Donna Hayward, naively follows her to support her. Despite Laura's misgivings, she lets Donna come along. After a client spikes Donna's drink and takes her top off, Laura drags her away. She begs Donna not to become like her.

Bob's rival MIKE confronts Leland in front of Laura. After MIKE brandishes Teresa's ring, Leland recalls killing Teresa, an underage prostitute who resembles Laura. Teresa once recruited Laura to have sex with Leland, but he backed out after seeing Laura. (Note: After Teresa's death, Ronette Pulaski tells Laura that Teresa was trying to blackmail someone and wanted to learn more about Laura's father. It is implied that Leland killed Teresa to stop this scheme. Two deleted scenes show Teresa inquiring about Laura's father and giving Leland a phone call. Although the film does not state what Teresa tells Leland, he is visibly disturbed and upset on the other end.) MIKE tries to tell Laura that Leland is Bob, but Leland causes a din that mostly drowns out MIKE's words. That night, Jacques dispatches Bobby and Laura to pick up some cocaine. In the woods they meet a man, Deputy Cliff Howard from Deer Meadow. The deputy takes out a gun and Bobby shoots him. (Note: A deleted scene reveals that the package of white powder the deputy was carrying was actually baby laxative.)

At night, Leland hands his wife Sarah a spiked drink. She hesitates, but finishes the drink at Leland's urging. While Sarah dreams of a pale horse, (Note: In episode 14 of the TV series, Bob drugs Sarah again to set up the murder of Maddy Ferguson, and Sarah has a similar vision.) Bob rapes Laura, and his face turns into Leland's. The next day, a distressed Laura can barely think. She has a vision in which an angel disappears. She breaks up with James, and Bobby realizes she only dated him for cocaine.

Jacques summons Laura to his cabin for a sex party with Leo Johnson and another underage prostitute, Ronette Pulaski. Jacques rapes Laura. Leland arrives and knocks Jacques unconscious while Leo flees the cabin, then drags the girls to an abandoned train car. Laura watches her captor's face flicker between Leland and Bob. Bob says that he wants to possess her. Leland shows her the diary pages he tore out and says, "I always thought you knew it was me." A guardian angel helps Ronette escape, while MIKE tosses Laura Teresa's ring. Laura puts on Teresa's ring, distressing Leland. Leland/Bob kills her and throws her body into the river.

In the Red Room, Bob and Leland meet MIKE and the Arm, who demand "garmonbozia" (translated in subtitles as "pain and sorrow") from Bob. In response, Bob draws blood from Leland (who is unaware of his surroundings (Note: In Episode 16 of the TV series, Leland only appears to regain consciousness of his own actions after he is mortally injured and Bob leaves his body.)) and spatters it on the floor, with the Arm consuming it in the form of creamed corn. Laura's body floats down the river, where it will be found in the morning. Cooper comforts Laura's spirit in the Red Room. An angel appears before them and Laura cries tears of joy.

== Cast ==
- Sheryl Lee as Laura Palmer
- Ray Wise as Leland Palmer
- Kyle MacLachlan as Special Agent Dale Cooper
- Mädchen Amick as Shelly Johnson
- Dana Ashbrook as Bobby Briggs
- Phoebe Augustine as Ronette Pulaski
- David Bowie as Special Agent Phillip Jeffries
- Eric Da Re as Leo Johnson
- Miguel Ferrer as Special Agent Albert Rosenfield
- Pamela Gidley as Teresa Banks
- Heather Graham as Annie Blackburn
- Chris Isaak as Special Agent Chester Desmond
- Moira Kelly as Donna Hayward
- Peggy Lipton as Norma Jennings
- David Lynch as Regional Bureau Chief Gordon Cole
- James Marshall as James Hurley
- Jürgen Prochnow as Woodsman
- Harry Dean Stanton as Carl Rodd
- Kiefer Sutherland as Special Agent Sam Stanley
- Lenny Von Dohlen as Harold Smith
- Grace Zabriskie as Sarah Palmer
- Frances Bay as Mrs. Tremond / Mrs. Chalfont
- Jonathan J. Leppell as Pierre Tremond
- Catherine E. Coulson as Margaret Lanterman ("The Log Lady")
- Michael J. Anderson as The Man from Another Place
- Frank Silva as Killer Bob
- Walter Olkewicz as Jacques Renault
- Al Strobel as Phillip Michael Gerard / MIKE
- Gary Hershberger as Mike Nelson
- Andrea Hays as Heidi
- Carlton Lee Russell as the Jumping Man
- Rick Aiello as Deputy Howard
- Gary Bullock as Sheriff Cable
- Chris Pedersen as Tommy
- Victor Rivers as Buck
- Calvin Lockhart as The Electrician
- Julee Cruise as Roadhouse Singer

The following actors and characters appear only in deleted scenes, later released as Twin Peaks: The Missing Pieces:

- Michael Ontkean as Sheriff Harry S. Truman
- Warren Frost as Dr. Will Hayward
- Everett McGill as Ed Hurley
- Jack Nance as Pete Martell
- Kimmy Robertson as Lucy Moran
- Joan Chen as Josie Packard
- Harry Goaz as Deputy Sheriff Andy Brennan
- Michael Horse as Deputy Sheriff Tommy "Hawk" Hill
- Russ Tamblyn as Dr. Lawrence Jacoby
- Wendy Robie as Nadine Hurley
- Don S. Davis as Major Garland Briggs
- Charlotte Stewart as Betty Briggs
- Mary Jo Deschanel as Eileen Hayward
- David Brisbin as Second Woodsman

== Production ==
=== Development ===
ABC canceled the Twin Peaks TV series after its second season. The series' production company, Aaron Spelling Productions, considered footing the bill for a third season and distributing the episodes by itself, but balked at the $500,000-an-episode cost. In February 1991, shortly before Twin Peaks was canceled, David Lynch signed a three-picture deal with French distributor CIBY 2000. Lynch asked CIBY to make a Twin Peaks film, saying that he was "not yet finished with the material". He also called the film "my cherry-pie present to the fans of the show – however, one that's wrapped in barbed wire". Fire Walk with Me was announced just a month after the series was cancelled, and Lynch finished the film less than a year after it was greenlit.

The film was beset by behind-the-scenes production drama, with CIBY and Spelling fighting over the film rights. Ultimately, Spelling retained most of the international distribution rights, and CIBY acquired distribution rights in France and North America. Although the Los Angeles Times initially reported that Fire Walk with Me would be the first phase of Lynch's three-film deal with CIBY, the film was removed from the deal and produced separately. The film had a budget of either $10 or $12 million. By contrast, Lynch's original CIBY deal called for an outlay of $70 million for three films.

Although Twin Peaks co-creator Mark Frost received an executive producer credit on the film, he was not involved with the film, as he and Lynch disagreed on whether to make a prequel or sequel. Lynch wanted a prequel because "I was in love with the character of Laura Palmer and her contradictions: radiant on the surface but dying inside". Frost wanted a sequel because he "felt very strongly that our audience wanted to see the story go forward". He proposed starting the film right where the final episode left off. Lynch's vision won out, as CIBY wanted Lynch to be involved. Frost had already grown tense with Lynch during the troubled production of the second season of the TV series. He left the production team, and Lynch hired Robert Engels, who had previously written several episodes of the TV series, to co-write the script. Frost later said that he was impressed by how the film's non-linear narrative managed to combine elements of both prequels and sequels.

=== Casting ===
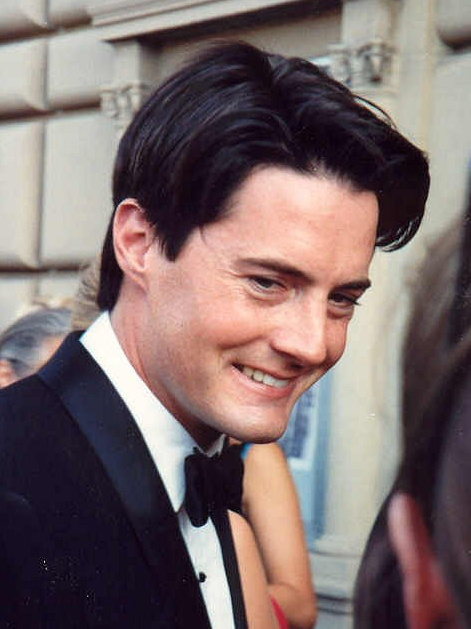
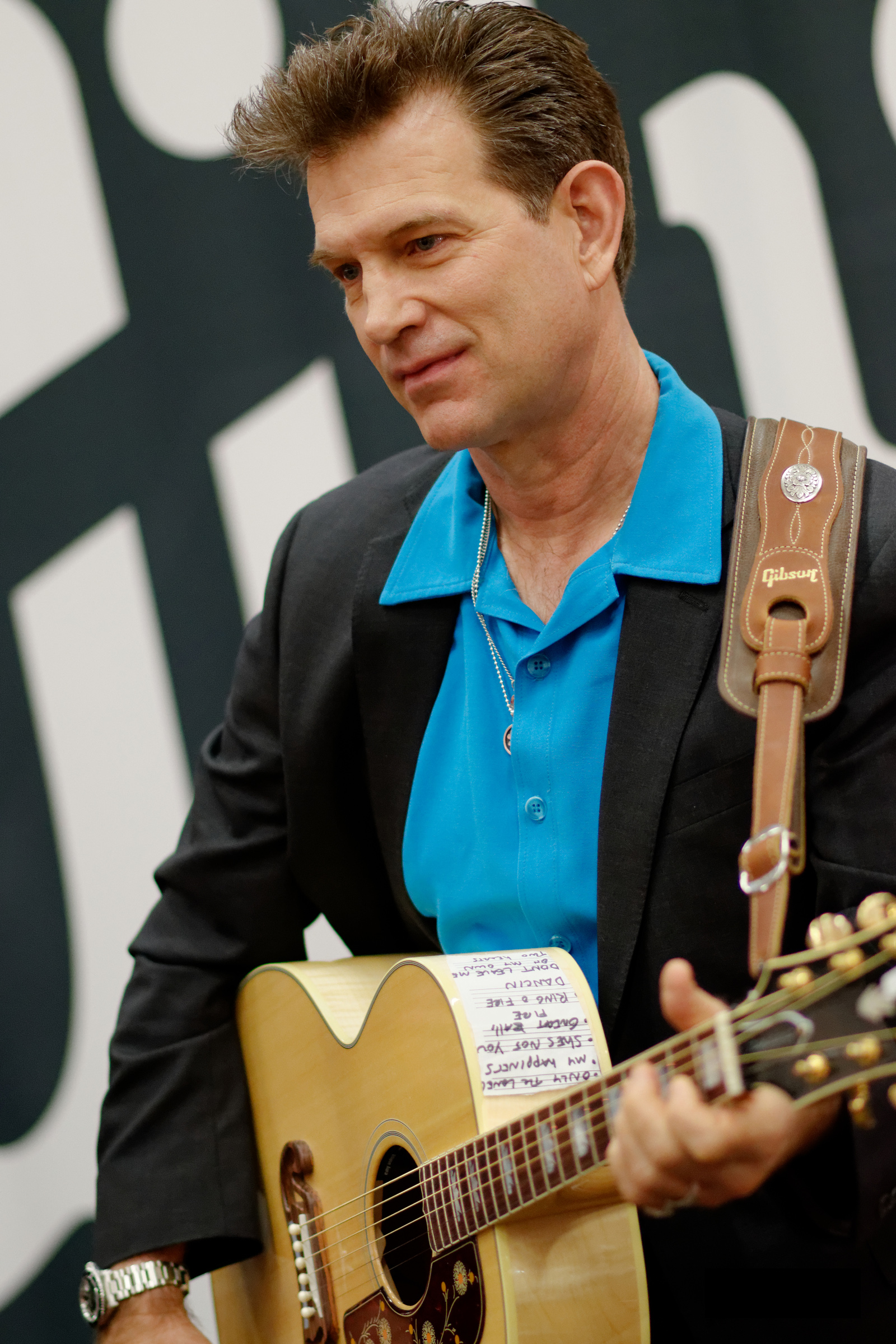
Lynch had to fill in two leads from the TV series. Kyle MacLachlan, who played FBI agent Dale Cooper (left), was largely replaced by Chris Isaak (right). In addition, Lara Flynn Boyle, who played Donna Hayward, was replaced by Moira Kelly.

Lynch planned to start filming in August 1991, but Kyle MacLachlan (Dale Cooper) prompted a delay by threatening to pull out. MacLachlan provided various reasons for his reluctance to participate. He was worried about being typecast as a Cooper-esque figure in future productions. In 2000, he added that he "felt a little abandoned" by Lynch and Frost during the second season of the TV series, as the two were simultaneously working on their own projects. He said that he blamed himself for souring his relationship with Lynch. After a month, MacLachlan agreed to return, on condition that he would only appear for five days of shooting. This forced Lynch and Engels to rewrite the first act, which originally had Cooper investigating Teresa Banks' murder. MacLachlan later explained that he reduced his involvement because Lynch did not agree to "have a meaningful discussion [with him] about some of those scenes", without providing specifics. Lynch filled in the gap with Chris Isaak, a singer whose songs he had previously used in Blue Velvet and Wild at Heart. He also cast Pamela Gidley to play Teresa Banks, the young woman whose murder starts the film's narrative; she had previously auditioned for the role of Shelly Johnson that eventually went to Mädchen Amick.

The film was made without Twin Peaks series regulars Lara Flynn Boyle (Donna Hayward), Sherilyn Fenn (Audrey Horne), and Richard Beymer (Benjamin Horne). The character of Donna was recast with Moira Kelly, who had worked with Sheryl Lee on Love, Lies, and Murder. Boyle and Fenn's absences were initially attributed to scheduling conflicts, which Fenn repeated in 2014. However, Fenn added in 1995 that she did not want to return because she "was extremely disappointed in the way the second season got off track". A 1997 biography of Lynch said that according to rumor, Boyle declined to return because she felt Lynch's treatment of female characters was misogynistic. Beymer declined to appear, remarking that he was dismayed by a scene in which Ben Horne offers Laura Palmer cocaine for a kiss, which he said reduced Ben to "just a coke dealer". He added that he expected Lynch to cut his "token" appearance from the final edit anyway. Fenn and Beymer eventually returned to the franchise for Twin Peaks: The Return.

=== Filming ===
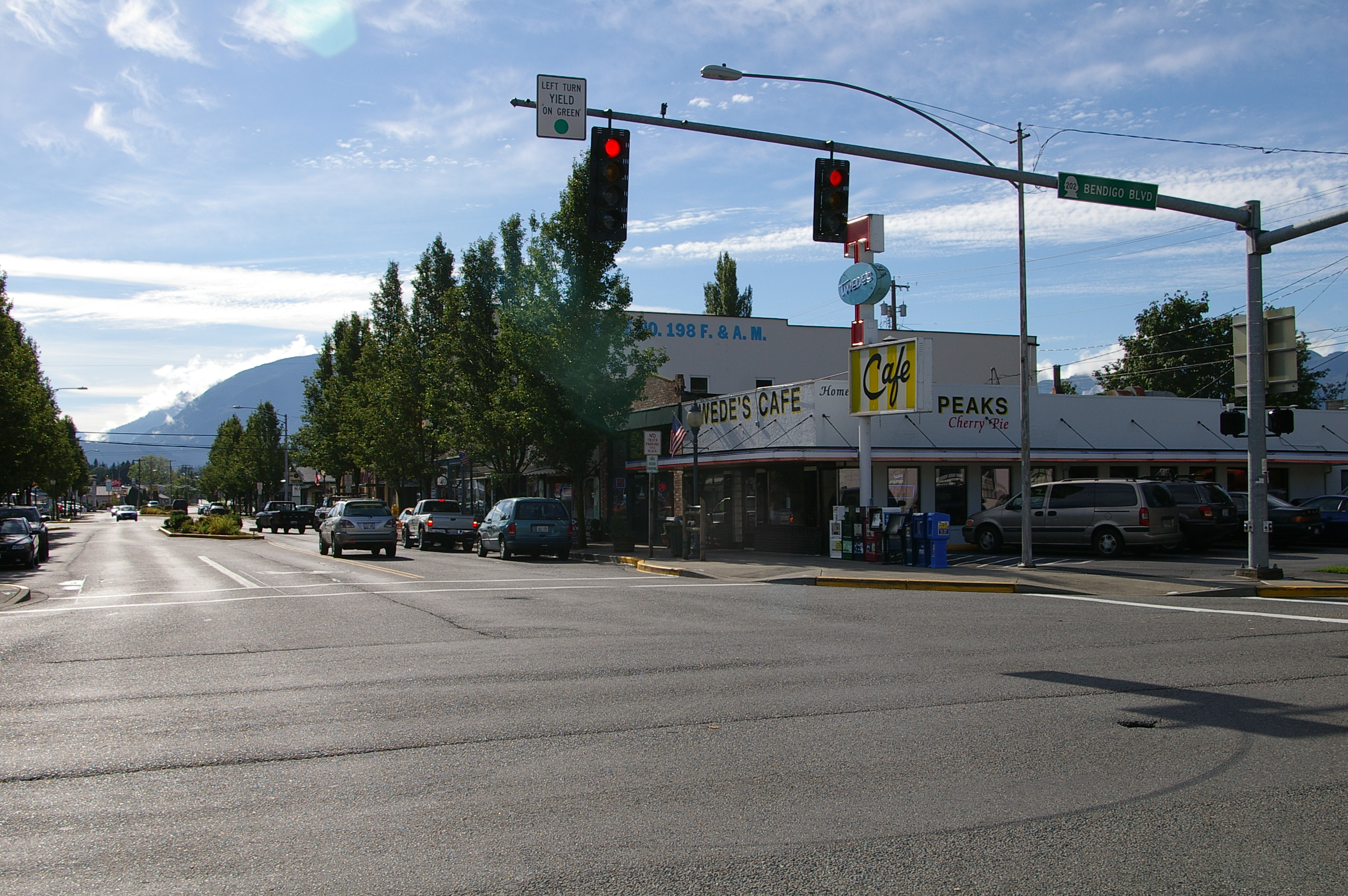
The Twin Peaks TV series was generally shot on soundstages, but the film was shot on location in Washington state, using many venues from the pilot episode, such as the original Double R Diner.

Principal photography began on September 4, 1991, in Snoqualmie, Washington and lasted for two months, until the end of October. The shoot spent four weeks shooting on location in Washington and another month shooting in the Los Angeles area. In addition to existing filming locations from the TV series, a Seattle building doubled for the FBI office in Philadelphia; the scene in Jacques' cabin was shot at an actual cabin in Angeles National Forest; and the scene where Laura dies in the train car was shot on a Los Angeles soundstage. Lynch had scheduled Laura's death scene for the Seattle shoot, but after the shooting went over schedule, the crew had to film Laura's death in Los Angeles on October 31, the last day of shooting.

Sheryl Lee appreciated the chance to play Laura as she lived, since the TV show had mostly asked her to play Laura in flashbacks. She said that filming the prequel "allowed me to come full circle with the character". Moreover, according to Lee, she was so intensely focused on the character that she did not start "having my own thoughts again" until two weeks after shooting wrapped.

In addition to MacLachlan's limitation of five days on set, Lynch insisted on casting Gidley even though she was shooting a different film at the same time; she shot her Fire Walk with Me scenes on her free days. Kiefer Sutherland reportedly sustained facial injuries during the shoot, forcing his scenes to be delayed, although the producers and police denied the claim. David Bowie shot his scenes in four or five days because Tin Machine needed to rehearse for their upcoming tour. He was not pleased with his Southern accent, and asked Lynch and Frost to overdub his lines when they used archive footage from the film in Twin Peaks: The Return. In addition, Lynch himself was dealing with a hernia "during the entire shoot"; he had injured himself while laughing too hard at something funny that Angelo Badalamenti did.

=== Editing and linkage to television series ===
Lynch originally shot more than five hours of footage, which he cut down to two hours and fourteen minutes. There were also rumors of a 220-minute cut. The deleted scenes were more lighthearted than Laura Palmer's story, and mainly featured supporting characters from the television series. Lynch said that "you'd like to have everybody there" and that he felt "a little bit of a sadness" about removing the scenes, which were eventually released in 2014 as Twin Peaks: The Missing Pieces.

Lynch, who had final cut privilege on the film, denied making the cuts for runtime reasons. However, he recognized that there was a "limit on the running time", and opted to focus the film on Laura Palmer, explaining that the deleted scenes "were too tangential to keep the main story progressing properly". At the film's premiere, he said that someone who had not watched the TV series should still be able to understand the film. He argued that while a first-time viewer might not have the same understanding as a TV watcher, "abstractions are a good thing and they exist all around us anyway". Film critic Keith Phipps questioned this view, explaining that although "the movie demand[s] to be seen on its own terms", a person who had not seen the series would find the film "nearly incomprehensible".

== Themes ==
=== Sexual abuse ===
According to Lynch, the movie is about "the loneliness, shame, guilt, confusion and devastation of the victim of incest." After the film's release, Lynch told Chris Rodley that he received many letters from victims of parental sexual abuse, who "were puzzled as to how he could have known exactly what it was like." Rodley said that although the character of Bob was an abstraction of Laura's story, "it was recognized as faithful to the subjective experience." Sheryl Lee said that many victims of incestuous abuse told her they were "glad that [the film] was made because it helped them to release a lot."

Lynch also highlighted the parents' role in Laura's trauma. He wanted to show Leland's internal conflict about his crimes, explaining that there was a "war in him." The series implies that Leland had been sexually abused as a child and that he is "repeating a cycle of abuse," which only Laura manages to stop. Lynch also wanted viewers to "put [themselves] in [Sarah Palmer's] place," as the film suggests that Sarah may have had some awareness of her husband's crimes. Grace Zabriskie, who portrayed Sarah, said that her character "stood there and watched" and "said nothing," as "she knows she can't protect Laura." Lynch suggested that Sarah may have felt that "it's better just to wait and hope that it stops, or that he's caught by someone else."

The film highlights the use of storytelling and dreaming as a way to process trauma. Several critics have noted that the film is more ambiguous than the TV series about what Bob is and how much power Bob actually has over Leland. According to Keith Phipps (The Dissolve), Dennis Lim (Film at Lincoln Center), and Owen Gleiberman (Entertainment Weekly), Bob can be interpreted as Laura's "elaborate fantasy system protecting her from realizing her father is her abuser," although Phipps caveats that Bob is also "a real, malevolent force being investigated by the FBI." An alternative explanation, suggested by Alex Pappademas (Grantland), is that Leland Palmer is schizophrenic and that Bob is a manifestation of one side of his personality. Laura Plummer (Indiana University) wrote that Fire Walk with Me draws on a much older strand of fairytales, including Giambattista Basile's 1636 story "Sun, Moon, and Talia" (an ancestor of Sleeping Beauty), which, she argues, also has undercurrents of parental incest.

Regardless of Bob's specific nature, Pappademas and Lindsay Hallam (University of East London) argue that the film's ambiguity about Bob is more satisfying than the interpretation offered by the series, because by squarely attributing Leland's crimes to demonic possession, the series appears to absolve him of responsibility for them. (Note: Ray Wise said that Lynch's initial plans for Leland's death scene on the TV series involved Leland seeing a light at the end of the tunnel, where Laura was waiting to forgive him. In the broadcast version, the dying Leland tells Dale Cooper that he sees a vision of Laura in light and that Laura is "beautiful," but the vision is not depicted on screen.) Pappademas hypothesizes that the series treated Bob as a supernatural being because Fire Walk with Me's version of the story was "too bleak for television." Hallam adds that in the film, Laura rejects Bob's invitation to become his host, thereby showing that Leland had "a choice ... in allowing [Bob] and the forces of evil to overtake [him]."

=== Spiritualism and morality ===
According to David Foster Wallace, the film portrays Laura as a "complex, contradictory, real" person, "both sinned-against and sinning," which "required of us an empathetic confrontation with the exact same muddy bothness in ourselves." Wallace suggested that one of the reasons Fire Walk with Me performed poorly at the box office was that American mass audiences were uncomfortable with Laura's moral ambiguity and wanted Lynch to condemn her for the various crimes she commits in the film. He argued that filmgoers generally go to the movies for a respite from the ambiguity of real life, which Fire Walk with Me does not allow.

The film incorporates Christian iconography but also questions it. Early in the film, a depressed Laura predicts to Donna Hayward that angels will abandon her. Ron Garcia, the film's cinematographer, explained that he shot the scene at a high angle, as though "an unseen angel [was] looking down on the evil events below." In a portion of the scene that was removed from the final cut and released in 2014, Donna's father Will reassures Laura that "the angels will return, and when you see the one that's meant to help you, you will weep with joy." (Note: Matt Fagerholm (RogerEbert.com) believes that the scene was cut because while Hayward "explicitly states the meaning" of the film's ending, "Lynch wants us to intuit its meaning, as a true artist does.")

At the end of the film, after Laura is killed, she is indeed welcomed by an angel. This ending resembles that of The Elephant Man, where Merrick's mother appears as an angel to welcome her son. More broadly, the guardian angel and similar entities are a semi-frequent motif in Lynch films, such as Eraserhead and Wild at Heart. However, this motif is more complicated than it first appears. Katie Kapurch and Jon Marc Smith argue that the film repeatedly emphasizes that angels "did nothing to protect Laura" during her life, while Lindsay Hallam suggests that the angels were silent because they knew all along that Laura was strong enough "to reach this point of redemption on her own."

=== Surrealism ===
The film was noted for its stylistic divergence from the TV series, which was a soap opera with fantastic elements and a "cosy eccentricity," in contrast to Lynch's frequently-surrealistic feature films. Chris Hughes writes that the film's more surrealist sequences were influenced by Jean Cocteau's film The Blood of a Poet (1932).

Mary Sweeney, the film's editor, said that fans "so badly wanted it to be like the TV show, and it wasn't. It was a David Lynch feature. And people were very angry about it. They felt betrayed." Looking back in 2017, Matthew Jackson (Syfy) said that the film had "all of the darkness of Twin Peaks with almost none of the soap opera irony, quirky humor or disorienting charm." Lindsay Hallam attributes the initial negative reaction to the fact that "Lynch does not let [the audience] off the hook – we are taken so far into Laura's experience, without any respite."

== Reception ==
=== Box office ===
In a reversal of the usual practice, the film was first released in Japan on May 16, 1992 to capitalize on the show's devoted Japanese fanbase, under the title Twin Peaks: The Last Seven Days of Laura Palmer. Although Japanese reviews were mixed, the film was greeted with long lines of moviegoers at theaters. By early August, the film had grossed around $2.9 million. According to cinematographer Ron Garcia, Japanese women particularly appreciated the film. He believed "that the enthusiasm of the Japanese women comes from a gratification of seeing in Laura some acknowledgment of their suffering in a repressive society."

After an early premiere at the Snoqualmie Twin Peaks Festival on August 14–16, 1992, New Line Cinema released the film in the United States on August 28, 1992. It grossed a total of US$1.8 million in 691 theaters in its opening weekend and went on to gross a total of $4.2 million in North America, well below its estimated $15 million break-even point. (New Line had paid $6 million for the North American distribution rights.) The disappointing worldwide box office prompted CIBY to cancel its plans for a proper film sequel to the television series. The film was better received in France, where it managed to avoid bombing.

==== Rationale for box office performance ====
The film's poor box office returns in North America have been attributed to various causes. Steve O'Brien (Yahoo Movies) pointed out that the series had already been cancelled due to low ratings, meaning that "it's not as if there was a public thirst for more Twin Peaks." Lynch suggested that there might have still been an audience for the film at the time it was greenlit, but lamented that "during the year that it took to make the film, everything changed." In fact, shortly before the film was released in the United States, The New York Times remarked that American interest in the series had "long [since] ... faded."

The film also alienated its remaining viewers because it was not a conventional continuation of the television series, focused on a character who rarely appeared in the show, and omitted many fan-favorite characters. It intentionally disregarded many hanging threads from season two of the TV series, even though the series left "numerous cliffhangers." At the same time, the film assumes a working understanding of the TV series. For example, the first act of the film focuses on the town of Deer Meadow, whose effect on the audience comes from being "a parallel-universe version" of the town of Twin Peaks, but "dumber, meaner, [and] uglier."

=== Festival circuit and accolades ===
Twin Peaks: Fire Walk with Me was entered into the 1992 Cannes Film Festival in competition for the Palme d'Or, where it was met with a polarized response. According to Lynch, CIBY's Francis Bouygues was not well-liked in France, which complicated the reception. Lynch said that when he arrived at Cannes, he felt a hostile environment and could sense that "people [were] very angry and upset." He added that the Cannes audience booed the film, describing the experience as "horrible", although co-writer Robert Engels denied hearing any boos. Contemporary news reports mention a mixture of "booing and applause" and some "hoots and whistles."

Critics at Cannes were generally unimpressed by the film. Roger Ebert (Chicago Sun-Times), who deemed the film "shockingly bad," reported that he spoke with over a dozen U.S. and Canadian critics at Cannes and only one liked the film. Janet Maslin (The New York Times) dismissed the film as "disastrous", "pathologically unpleasant", and "brain-dead grotesque". Filmmaker Quentin Tarantino said that while he had enjoyed Lynch's earlier movies, Fire Walk with Me made him think "David Lynch had disappeared so far up his own ass that I have no desire to see another David Lynch movie until I hear something different."

Despite its mixed critical and poor commercial response, Fire Walk with Me received consideration for several awards, particularly for Angelo Badalamenti's musical score. At the 19th Saturn Awards, the film won the award for Best Music and was also nominated for Best Horror Film, Best Actress (Sheryl Lee), Best Supporting Actor (Ray Wise), and Best Writing. At the 8th Independent Spirit Awards, the film won the award for Best Original Score and was also nominated for Best Female Lead (Lee).

=== Contemporary critical response ===
Although Lynch expected the film to be polarizing and said it would be impossible to make a movie that appealed to everyone, reviews from American critics were generally negative. New Line Cinema declined to pre-screen the film for critics, which the Los Angeles Times called "at the very least, unusual." The Times surmised that New Line withheld the film because industry insiders considered it "an unqualified disaster" and "expected bad reviews." The New York Times recalled that when the film finally hit theaters, "film critics who sat through it left theaters and screening rooms thirsting for vengeance."

Vincent Canby (The New York Times) panned the film, saying that it "induce[d] a state of simulated brain death". Rita Kempley (The Washington Post) condemned "Lynch's pretentiousness", describing the film as a "perversely moving, profoundly self-indulgent prequel" with "weirdly fundamentalist" religious imagery. Other critics who harshly criticized the film included Dave Kehr ("simplistic, puritanical", "depressingly interminable", and "proudly naive"), Owen Gleiberman ("a true folly—almost nothing in it adds up"), and Janis Froelich ("it's trauma cinema ... never has a beginning so dishonored the ensuing story").

Several critics submitted more measured, if still negative, reviews. Todd McCarthy (Variety) questioned the need for a prequel, suggesting that while the film was "sometimes captivating", everyone watching the film knew Leland Palmer was the killer, and Laura felt more like a "tiresome teenager" than a "compelling character." Peter Travers (Rolling Stone) wrote that the film was "no match for the two-hour TV pilot" and that "Lynch's control falters", but remained hopeful for future Lynch films. Michael Wilmington (Los Angeles Times) asserted that the film "isn't a superior movie" on its own, but argued that the combination of the film and series was "a pop-cultural landmark, with all the bad taste and high style required."

Several critics who had praised Lynch's earlier films simply declined to review Fire Walk with Me, including Richard Corliss, David Ansen, and Gene Siskel. One of the few American critics who publicly defended the film was Steve Erickson (LA Weekly), who wrote that while the film's first act was marred by "extraneous weirdness and sophomoric symbolism", Laura Palmer's story was "remarkable and disturbingly authentic." He questioned why the film community was so quick to attack the film, explaining that "we're happy to ... celebrate genius when all it means is some kind of kooky eccentricity", but "when that genius insists on its own dark audacity", the community treats it like "radioactive waste". He concluded that "people are ultimately appalled not by [the film's] badness but its integrity." In 1998, critic Manohla Dargis (also LA Weekly) called Erickson's review "one of the bravest pieces of film criticism I've read". Jay Boyar (Orlando Sentinel) also praised the film, calling its unvarnished portrayal of Laura Palmer's suffering "sensationally strong". He acknowledged that the film would have trouble finding its audience, as it alienated both fans of the series and non-fans of the series, but concluded that someone who both had "seen most of the series" and "was willing to let go of the series" could fully appreciate "the movie's dramatically different perspective".

British critics were somewhat more positive about the film. Kim Newman (Sight & Sound) praised the film for going beyond the "tidy, conventional and domesticated" cliches of contemporary horror movies, as well as Lynch's decision to make a prequel film, as the TV series also "rak[ed] over the ashes of the past". Jeff Dawson (Empire) added that while the film was "quite probably" on some level "pretentious codswallop", the film was a "triumph" and Lynch's "darkest, most disturbing film to date". However, not all British critics praised the film. Alexander Walker (Evening Standard) wrote that "the whole production exudes a contempt for viewers". Barry Norman (BBC) said that while he felt "seething irritation" while watching the film, it began to "ma[k]e a kind of sense" to him over time, and his opinion was improving. He cautioned that Lynch was "a very original filmmaker, and since there are so few of those about, we ought perhaps to give him the benefit of the doubt, and indulge him a little."

== Critical reappraisal and legacy ==
Fire Walk with Me was a beautiful experience, in a way. When you're down, when you've been kicked down in the street, and then kicked a few more times till you're really bleeding and some teeth are out, then you really only have up to go. It's so beautiful to be down there.

— Lynch in 1997

In Lynch on Lynch (1997), Chris Rodley wrote that "only now is the movie enjoying a degree of cautious but sympathetic critical re-evaluation." The trend grew more visible by the mid-2000s. In 2002, Ed Gonzalez (Slant Magazine) gave the film four out of four stars. In 2003, Slant also included the film in its list of "100 Essential Films." In 2007, critic Mark Kermode (The Guardian) told Lynch that while contemporary critics "didn't just dislike [the film], they were actively hostile towards it," today "people feel it's actually a masterpiece."

Fire Walk with Me has maintained its reputation in the 2010s and 2020s; in 2014, Robbie Collin (The Telegraph) wrote that "time has passed, and its brilliance is gradually coming into focus, just as Lynch hoped it would." Following Lynch's death in 2025, Esther Zuckerman (The New York Times) called the film "revered." The film placed highly on several retrospective rankings of 1990s films, including #4 by the British Film Institute (2019), #11 by Slant magazine (2012), #18 by IndieWire (2022), and #31 by Time Out (2024). The 2022 Sight & Sound critics' poll ranked the film #211 all-time, tied with (among others) Brief Encounter and Raiders of the Lost Ark. The same poll ranked Fire Walk with Me as Lynch's third-best feature film and fourth-best film, with Mulholland Drive at #8, Blue Velvet at #85, and Twin Peaks: The Return at #152. IGN also ranked it the 76th-best horror movie in history. In 2011, the NME music publication ranked Angelo Badalamenti's soundtrack the greatest film score in history. On the review aggregator website Rotten Tomatoes, 67% of 83 critics' reviews are positive, with an average rating of 7.2/10. The website's consensus reads: "For better or worse, Twin Peaks: Fire Walk with Me is every bit as strange and twisted as you'd expect from David Lynch."

The film and the TV series both benefited from the wave of high-concept cable television dramas in the 2000s and 2010s, colloquially dubbed "Peak TV." Sarah Hughes (The Observer) noted that Twin Peaks was "the show that changed television," and explained that "practically every drama with a mystery at its heart, from Lost to Wayward Pines, has been branded as the new Twin Peaks." Although the show's tension with the formulaic aspects of 1980s–1990s network television was considered "shocking" at the time, the show's more surrealistic aspects, which Fire Walk with Me underscored, were widely copied by a new generation of television showrunners. David Sims (The Atlantic) added that while Fire Walk with Me was "abrasively surreal" and "barely devotes any time to the TV show's core cast outside of Sheryl Lee and Ray Wise," Twin Peaks "practically invented the 'auteurist' idea of creator-driven TV that now pervades every premium network."

The film began shedding its reputation for inaccessibility over the years as the public learned more about sexual abuse and its survivors. In The Best Film You've Never Seen (2013), John Dahl said that Laura Palmer's story "wouldn't be quite as shocking today." Brent Simon (The A.V. Club) added that the subsequent MeToo movement helped open up society to stories like Laura's. Phil Hoad (The Guardian) wrote that while the film remained "unremittingly grim" in 2025, "what seemed in the early 1990s like a self-harming refusal of the series' winning quirkiness now seems ... [like] a striking feat of empathy on Lynch's part".

Several critics have praised the film for disrupting traditional narratives of Americana. Calum Marsh (The Village Voice) wrote that the film exposes "not only the evil buried somewhere in the quintessential middle-class family, but the evil buried somewhere in all of us, and our capacity for it." Scout Tafoya (RogerEbert.com) said that the film showed "the lie we'd been living under Bush and Reagan, that what we needed was a return to family values, to lie about everything that made us uncomfortable." Dom Nero (Esquire) recalled that as a child, he had been taught that speaking backwards (like the characters in Twin Peaks' Red Room) was the work of the Devil, and said that Fire Walk with Me encodes "the concept that demons were hiding in plain sight."

In 1997, Lynch said that "I feel bad that Fire Walk with Me did no business and that a lot of people hated the film. But I really like the film. But it had a lot of baggage with it. It's as free and as experimental as it could be within the dictates it had to follow." He continued Fire Walk with Me's experiments with narrative in his later films, and the premonition-like ambience of the Deer Meadow prologue presaged the "echoing story-within-a-story" of Mulholland Drive. By 2018, he was able to declare that "the collective consciousness changes and people come around. Look at Van Gogh: the guy could not sell one painting and now nobody can afford them."

=== 2017 continuation ===
Although Lynch insisted on making Fire Walk with Me a prequel instead of a sequel, he set up a sequel in the scene where a future version of Annie Blackburn reveals Dale Cooper's whereabouts to Laura Palmer. Lynch planned for someone to find Laura's transcript of Annie's message, and envisioned a story "going back and forth in time." Although a rumor spread that CIBY was planning two more Twin Peaks films, the film's lack of commercial success ruled out a sequel.

Despite Lynch's prior qualms, Showtime eventually revived the franchise. In 2017, a third season of the series, styled as Twin Peaks: The Return, was released. Lynch confirmed that Twin Peaks: Fire Walk with Me would be significant to the events of The Return, and one critic suggested that The Return makes Fire Walk with Me "the key to the entire Twin Peaks universe." The Return shared some of Fire Walk with Me's narrative sensibility, and "went out of its way to avoid giving the audience much of what they expected." However, Lynch declined to offer an explanation, writing that "everybody has theories about what the show is about, which is great, and it wouldn't matter if I explained my theory."

=== Perspectives from other filmmakers ===
Quentin Tarantino panned the film at Cannes, as noted above. Some other directors who saw the film in theaters were more favorable: Jacques Rivette and Céline Sciamma both enjoyed the film despite having not seen the television series. Rivette called the film "the craziest film in the history of cinema," explaining that "I have no idea what I saw, all I know is that I left the theater floating six feet above the ground." Sciamma agreed that while she felt "totally lost" at times, the film "changed the way that I look at cinema" and after leaving the theater, "the whole world felt different".

James Gray called Fire Walk with Me "a classic example of how the critics get it wrong," adding that the film's empathy for how Laura "suffer[ed] so profoundly [was] a thing of beauty." Gregg Araki called the film Lynch's "masterpiece" and a "perfect movie," praising Sheryl Lee's performance as "one of the greatest performances in the history of cinema." He included the film in his list of the ten greatest films of all time during the 2012 Sight & Sound directors' poll. Jane Schoenbrun said that it was "my favorite film" and "goes to places that made me feel things I'd never felt before."

According to French streaming website LaCinetek, Bong Joon-ho, Bertrand Bonello and Lynne Ramsay (in addition to Sciamma) are fans of the film. John Waters, Alexandra Cassavetes, and Andrew Bujalski have also praised the film.

== Home media ==
=== Releases ===
The Fire Walk with Me home video distribution rights have changed hands many times. In 1993, New Line Home Video released the film in the United States on VHS and LaserDisc. New Line also released a Special Edition DVD in 2002. The film received several international DVD releases, including 2001 DVD distributed by UK company Second Sight Films and 2005 release distributed by Cinema Club.

The film also received a round of Blu-ray releases in the early 2010s, including in France, Australia, the United Kingdom, and finally North America in 2014. The North American release contains more than 90 minutes of deleted and extended scenes from the film.

The North American distribution rights are currently held by Janus Films, which arranged for a Criterion Collection DVD and Blu-ray re-release in 2017 in conjunction with the release of Twin Peaks: The Return. In 2019 and 2025, the film was again re-released as part of Twin Peaks: From Z to A, a Blu-ray collection that includes all three television seasons, Fire Walk with Me, The Missing Pieces, and a collection of old and new special features.

=== Deleted scenes ===
When Lynch cut various supporting characters out of the final edit, he remarked that "it might be good sometime to do a longer version with these other things in, because a lot of the characters that are missing in the finished movie had been filmed. They're part of the picture, they're just not necessary for the main story." However, distribution companies repeatedly declined to release the scenes on home video. New Line considered including the scenes on the 2002 Special Edition DVD, but backed out; contemporary reports said that New Line could not strike a deal with MK2 (which by then had acquired the rights to the deleted scenes), while Lynch said that New Line balked at his $100,000 fee to edit, mix, and color grade the remaining footage. MK2 considered releasing the scenes but did not do so, which Lynch attributed to economic pressures caused by the 2008 financial crisis.

The deleted scenes were not released until 2014, when Lynch, MK2, and CBS Home Entertainment compiled them into a feature film called Twin Peaks: The Missing Pieces to accompany the 2014 Blu-Ray version of Fire Walk with Me. Reviewing the release, The Guardian wrote that "the scenes are too fragmented to be viewed as anything other than a cluster of vignettes, but that does not diminish their eccentric power." The Dissolve added that the film "looked a lot like what deleted scenes usually look like: dead ends, intriguing digressions, smart discards, and intriguing unused options," and concluded that while "it's a treat to see everyone in character again, ... [it's] hard to imagine how their inclusion would have improved the film."

== Soundtrack ==
The soundtrack to Twin Peaks: Fire Walk with Me was released on Warner Bros. Records on August 11, 1992. It includes music by Angelo Badalamenti, who had composed and conducted the music on the television series and its original soundtrack.

=== Music not included on the soundtrack album ===
During the film's end credits, the last minutes of Luigi Cherubini's Requiem in C minor is played. The recording used was conducted by Riccardo Muti, with the Ambrosian Singers and the Philharmonia Orchestra.

Also listed in the end credits are two pieces by David Lynch and David Slusser, "Double R Swing" and "Deer Meadow Shuffle", as well as "Blue Frank" by Lynch only.

== Awards and nominations ==
Award(s)	Category – Nominee(s)	Result
Cannes Film Festival	Palme d'Or – David Lynch	Nominated
Independent Spirit Awards	Best Original Score – Angelo Badalamenti	Won
Independent Spirit Awards	Best Female Lead – Sheryl Lee	Nominated
Saturn Awards	Best Music – Angelo Badalamenti	Won
Saturn Awards	Best Actress – Sheryl Lee	Nominated
Saturn Awards	Best Horror Film – Twin Peaks: Fire Walk with Me	Nominated
Saturn Awards	Best Supporting Actor – Ray Wise	Nominated
Saturn Awards	Best Writing – David Lynch and Robert Engels	Nominated

== Sources ==
- Hallam, Lindsay (2018). Twin Peaks: Fire Walk with Me (1st ed.). Liverpool University Press. doi:10.3828/liverpool/9781911325642.001.0001. ISBN 9781911325642.
- Hughes, David (2001). The Complete Lynch. London: Virgin. ISBN 9780753505984.
- Lynch, David; Rodley, Chris (1997). Lynch on Lynch. Faber and Faber. ISBN 0571178332.
- Lynch, David; McKenna, Kristine (2018). Room to Dream. New York: Random House. ISBN 9780399589195.
- Thorne, John (2016). The Essential Wrapped in Plastic: Pathways to Twin Peaks. John Thorne. ISBN 9780997108101.
- Woods, Paul A. (1997). Weirdsville USA: The Obsessive Universe of David Lynch. London: Plexus. ISBN 9780859652551.
