= Twin Peaks (fictional town) =

Fictional setting from Twin Peaks

Twin Peaks, Washington is a fictional town that serves as the primary setting of the American surrealist mystery horror drama television series Twin Peaks, created by Mark Frost and David Lynch, and the associated films Twin Peaks: Fire Walk with Me (1992) and Twin Peaks: The Missing Pieces (shot 1991, released 2014).

As established in the original series, the town of Twin Peaks lies "five miles south of the Canadian border, and twelve miles west of the [Washington-Idaho] state line." According to the now-iconic sign in the television show, the fictional town has a population of 51201—the final "1" having been painted on by an unknown figure to make the town seem much larger than its "actual" size. The forest surrounding Twin Peaks has "portals" to extradimensional locations called the Black Lodge and the White Lodge.

The established setting would place Twin Peaks within the Salmo-Priest Wilderness near the small town of Metaline Falls, 100 miles due north of Spokane.

Most of the show's exterior stock footage and establishing shots was shot in the Washington towns of Snoqualmie, North Bend, and Fall City, all around 25–30 miles from Seattle.

== Double R Diner ==
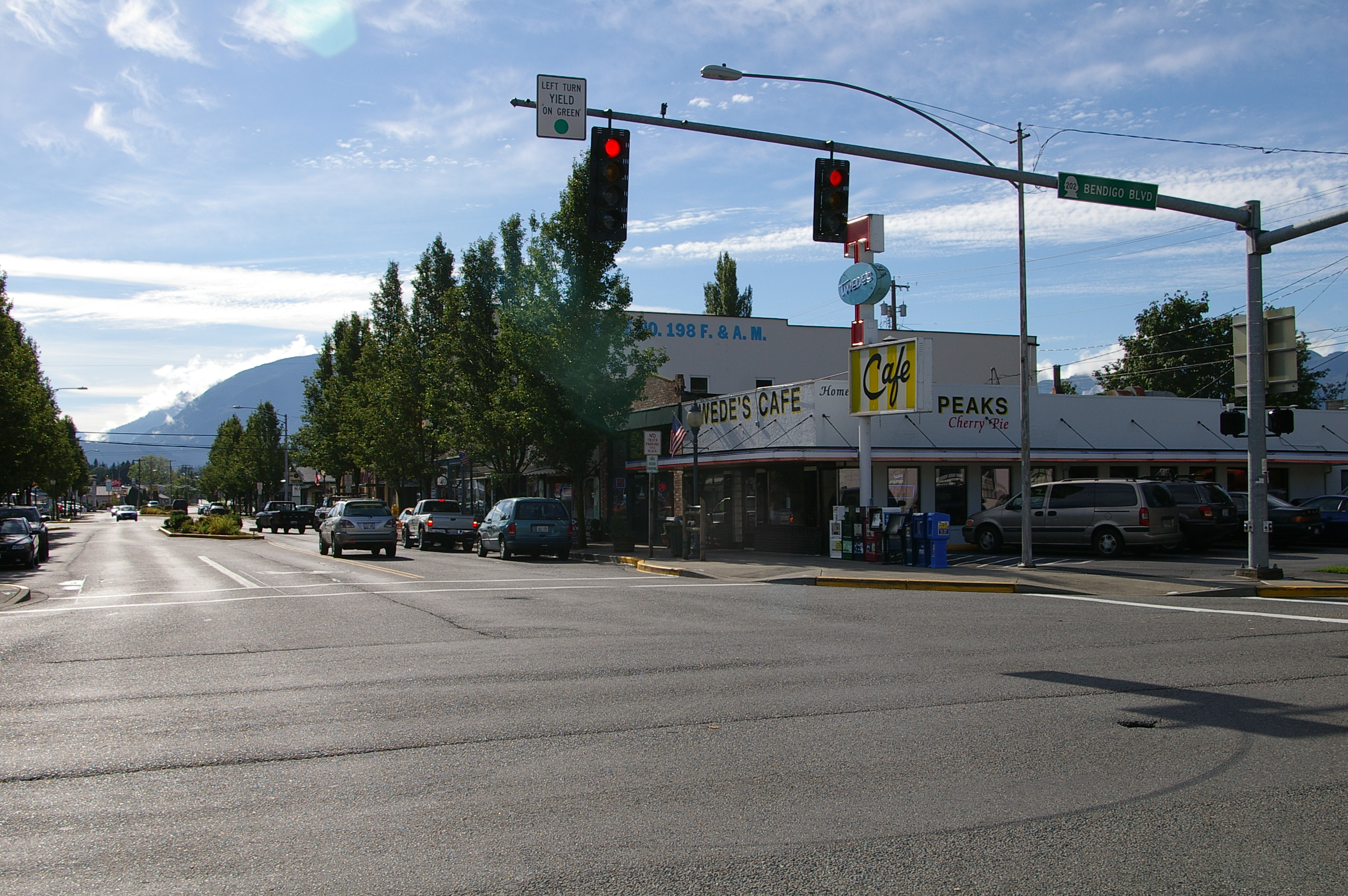
The Double R Diner was filmed at Twede's Cafe in North Bend.

The Double R Diner is owned and managed by Norma Jennings (Peggy Lipton). Norma employs two waitresses: Shelly Johnson (Mädchen Amick) and Heidi (Andrea Hays).

== The Great Northern Hotel ==
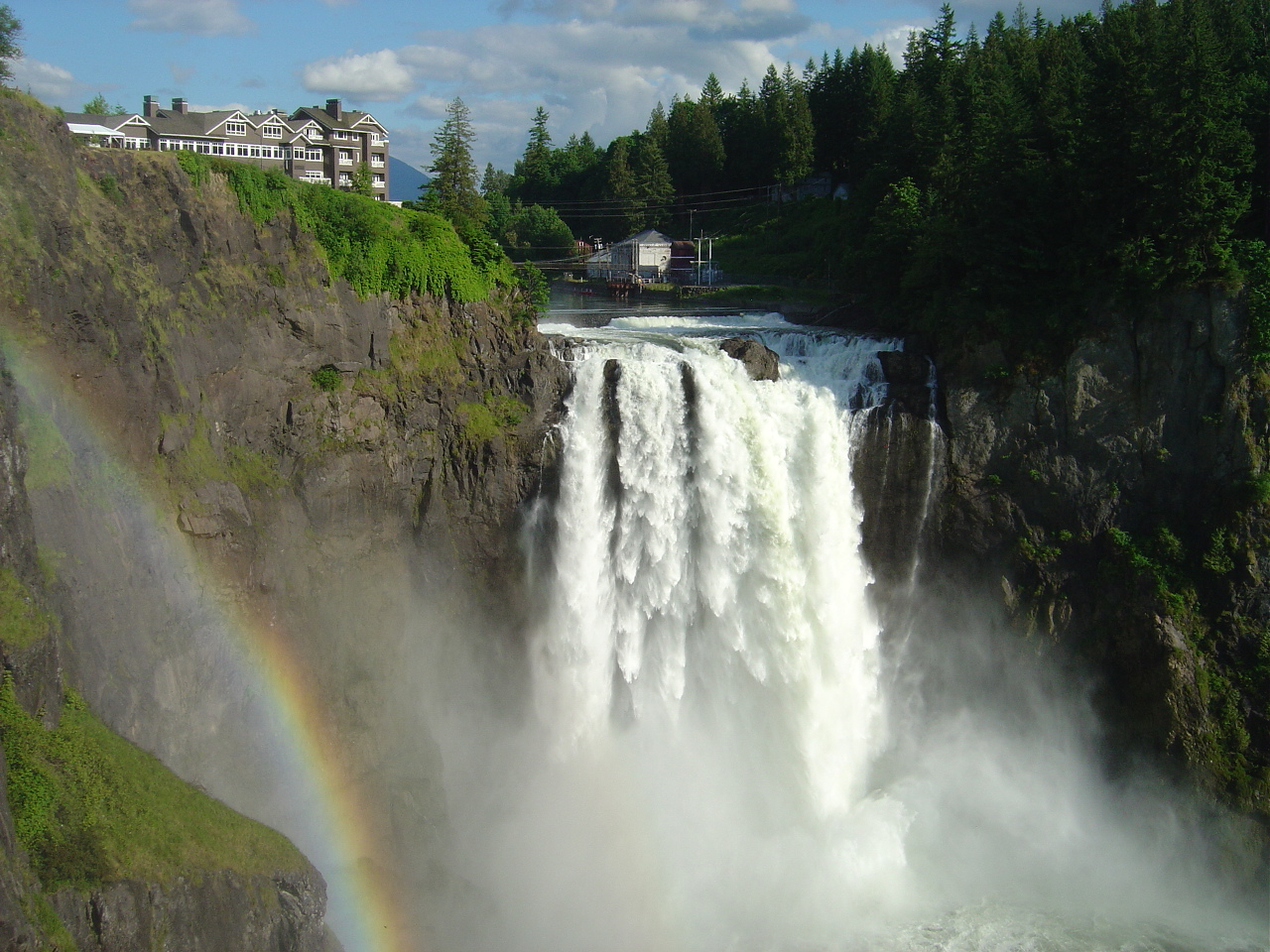
The Great Northern Hotel was filmed at the Salish Lodge, overlooking Snoqualmie Falls.

In seasons one and two, FBI Special Agent Dale Cooper stays in The Great Northern Hotel. The hotel is owned by Ben Horne, a businessman who also owns the local department store. In the first two seasons, much of Ben's time is devoted to building Ghostwood, a new country club and residential estate that is intended to replace the Packard Sawmill. Ben's attorney Leland Palmer assists him with the Ghostwood project; the death of Leland's daughter Laura Palmer is the catalyst for the series.

== Black and White Lodges ==
The Black Lodge is an extradimensional place that seems to include, primarily, the Red Room first seen by Agent Cooper in a dream early in the series. As events in the series unfold, it becomes apparent that the characters from the Red Room, the Black Lodge, and the White Lodge, are connected.

At first, it is revealed that there is a mysterious dark presence in the woods that the town's Bookhouse Boys have been combatting for generations. Although they do not know what it is, Native American policeman Deputy Hawk says that the Black Lodge is from the mythology of his people, describing it as:

The shadow-self of the White Lodge. The legend says that every spirit must pass through there on the way to perfection. There, you will meet your own shadow self. My people call it 'the Dweller on the Threshold' ... But it is said, if you confront the Black Lodge with imperfect courage, it will utterly annihilate your soul.

During the second season, Windom Earle relates a story about the White Lodge:

Once upon a time, there was a place of great goodness, called the White Lodge. Gentle fawns gamboled there amidst happy, laughing spirits. The sounds of innocence and joy filled the air. And when it rained, it rained sweet nectar that infused one's heart with a desire to live life in truth and beauty. Generally speaking, a ghastly place, reeking of virtue's sour smell. Engorged with the whispered prayers of kneeling mothers, mewling newborns, and fools, young and old, compelled to do good without reason ... But, I am happy to point out that our story does not end in this wretched place of saccharine excess. For there's another place, its opposite: a place of almost unimaginable power, chock full of dark forces and vicious secrets. No prayers dare enter this frightful maw. The spirits there care not for good deeds or priestly invocations, they're as likely to rip the flesh from your bone as greet you with a happy "good day". And if harnessed, these spirits in this hidden land of unmuffled screams and broken hearts would offer up a power so vast that its bearer might reorder the Earth itself to his liking.

As the Black and White Lodges become more prominent in the story, Major Briggs claims that during one or more of his disappearances, he had visited the White Lodge and goes on to offer advice regarding it.

=== Location ===
Although the Red Room began exclusively as a location within Agent Dale Cooper's dreams, the inhabitants began appearing in other locations in the town, inciting other elements in the plot, to the point where the Red Room and White/Black Lodge stories became one. After discovering a mysterious map in Owl Cave, it becomes evident to Earle and Cooper—both independently and with different motivations for wanting to visit it—that the entrance to the Black Lodge is located in Ghostwood Forest which surrounds the town of Twin Peaks, at a pool of a substance that smells like scorched engine oil and surrounded by 12 young sycamore trees. This area is known as Glastonbury Grove.

It is said that the key to gain entrance to the Black Lodge is fear—usually an act of brutal murder. This is in contrast to the key to the White Lodge, which is love. Another requirement to enter the Black Lodge through the entrance in Glastonbury Grove is that it may only be entered "...when Jupiter and Saturn meet..." When the above requirements are met and one approaches the pool in Glastonbury Grove, red curtains appear, which the person walks between before the curtains vanish once again.

=== Interior ===
There is little furniture in the Red Room aside from a few armchairs, a wheeled table and a couple of floor lamps. There is also a replica of the Venus de Medici (often mistaken for the Venus de Milo; the Venus de Milo can be seen in the hallway). There are no doors to speak of; movement from room to room is accomplished by crossing through another set of red curtains that lead to a narrow hallway. The floor is a chevron pattern of brown and white, and all sides of any room and all walls of any hallway encountered are covered by identical red curtains. In the final episode, a second room in the Lodge is seen, identical to the first. Between the two rooms is a narrow corridor which has the same floor and "walls" as the other two rooms.

Although the Lodge inhabitants speak English, their voices are warped and strangely clipped and their movements are unnatural (this effect is accomplished by the actors speaking in reverse and the footage is then played backwards). Residents often speak in riddles and non-sequiturs. The main inhabitants of the Lodge are The Man from Another Place, The Giant and Killer Bob.

In the final episode of Twin Peaks, Cooper meets The Man from Another Place, who refers to the Red Room as the "waiting room". This echoes Hawk's claim that every spirit must pass through the Black Lodge on the way to perfection and that the Red Room leads to the White Lodge as well.

The red curtains, zig-zag floors and bright spotlights of the White and Black Lodges have also appeared in several of David Lynch's other films. As the Masonic historian archeologist David Harrison notes in his article on Twin Peaks, the floor resembles a zig-zag version of the Mosaic Pavement in a Masonic lodge, hence the names Black Lodge and White Lodge, which consists of squares in the middle, but of triangles at the borders.

=== Inhabitants ===
The Black Lodge and White Lodge are home to many spirits and people alike, including Bob, Mike, the Man from Another Place, the Giant, Laura Palmer, and Dale Cooper.

The spirits can possess humans if they are let in: Bob possesses Leland Palmer but not Laura, who refuses to let him in. Later, Bob possesses Dale Cooper's doppelganger (not Cooper himself); The Giant and an elderly waiter from the Great Northern Hotel were "one and the same". Mike and The Man From Another Place (Mike's arm) possess Phillip Gerard.

=== References in popular culture ===
In the two-part Simpsons episode Who Shot Mr. Burns?, Chief Clancy Wiggum has trouble solving the case and falls into a dream sequence in which he sits in the Red Room with Lisa Simpson, who speaks backwards. She gives him clues in reverse-speak, but Wiggum is unable to understand her until she gives up in frustration and speaks normally. As with Twin Peaks, while recording Lisa's lines for the segment, Yeardley Smith recorded the part backwards and it was reversed. Several other parts in the segment are direct references to Twin Peaks, including a moving shadow on the curtain, and Wiggum's hair standing straight up after waking.

In the manga series Soul Eater, the Red Room is used as a motif when Soul Eater and Maka Albarn are infected with Black Blood. A demon who dances backward (similar to The Man from Another Place) to a skipping jazz record attempts to convince them to give in to the Black Blood's madness.

The Red Room is also parodied as "The Sitting Room" in multiple episodes of Scooby-Doo! Mystery Incorporated, first accessed by Scooby-Doo in a dream and later accessed by all of Mystery, Inc. under mass hypnosis. A helper figure similar to The Man from Another Place appears there, and, like the original Man, is played by Michael J. Anderson. The Sitting Room appears to be a spirit realm where both helpful and malicious entities can dwell, as well as pieces of the souls of those tainted by the Treasure of Crystal Cove.

A parody of the Red Room is featured as "The Club" in Gravity Falls, Season 1, Episode 4 "The Hand That Rocks the Mabel".

In an interview, Atlus co-founder Kazuma Kaneko confirmed that the Black Lodge was the main source of inspiration for the Velvet Room's design in the Persona video game series, though the color of the room was altered to blue in reference to David Lynch's film Blue Velvet.

The cult classic video game Deadly Premonition, that was heavily influenced by Twin Peaks, also has a Red Room of sorts that the protagonist Agent York Morgan visits on his dreams.

The video game The Evil Within 2 frequently uses the Red Room motif, in association with one of the primary antagonists, Stefano Valentini.

On an episode of The Late Late Show with James Corden in September 2017, the opening segment featured actor Kyle MacLachlan having turned his dressing room into the Red Room, including speaking in the warped backwards manner.

It is also referenced in All Hail King Julien in the third episode of season three "Dance, Dance, Resolution" in which Mort speaks backwards to King Julien in the Black Lodge. You can see the mythical pineapple shadow on the red curtains, and King Julien's parents are there. King Julian asks "Mort why are you talking backwards!?", Mort then does a strange forward walk that also seems somewhat backwards to which King Julien's parents clap, King Julien then tries to please his parents which then turns into Maurice, then King Julien awakes.

=== "Black Lodge" (song) ===
Twin Peaks' score conductor Angelo Badalamenti helped write the song "Black Lodge" on the 1993 Sound of White Noise album by Anthrax. The song was released as the album's third single on August 19, 1993.

The sound of the song differs greatly from the band's earlier thrash metal tracks, with AllMusic's Dave Connolly describing it as "cooled-down".

==== Music video ====
A music video was created for the song, being directed by past filmmaker Mark Pellington.

The video centers on a man and his wife, with the latter appearing to be a paraplegic. The man bathes, feeds, and dresses his wife, puts her in the backseat of a car and drives down Hollywood Boulevard. The man picks up a woman off of the street, Daphne (played by Jenna Elfman), with his assistant drugging her and taking her to an empty building. The assistant dresses Daphne up to look like the wife then straps her into a chair and places electrodes on her, while the wife sits across from her in a similar chair. The man tries to stimulate Daphne by rubbing her legs and having a puppy lick her face while the wife seems to feel what the woman does. The wife quickly returns to a catatonic state, while the assistant carries Daphne off and takes her picture in front of a backdrop that resembles the Red Room. As the video ends, the camera cuts to a shot of a board with several dozen pictures of other women who went through the same ordeal that Daphne did.

The band members briefly appear in the video, showing up in quick shots in the Red Room.

==== Track listing ====
All tracks are written by John Bush, Scott Ian, Frank Bello, Charlie Benante, and Angelo Badalamenti, except where noted.

No.	Title	Writer(s)	Length
1.	"Black Lodge" (Black Strings Mix)		5:21
2.	"Black Lodge" (Tremelo Mix)		5:23
3.	"Black Lodge" (Mellow to Mad Mix)		5:20
4.	"Love Her All I Can" (Kiss cover; featuring Gene Simmons and Paul Stanley)	Stanley	2:32
5.	"Cowboy Song" (Thin Lizzy cover)	Phil Lynott, Brian Downey	5:03

==== Personnel ====
Anthrax

- John Bush – lead vocals
- Dan Spitz – lead guitar
- Scott Ian – rhythm guitar, backing vocals
- Frank Bello – bass
- Charlie Benante – drums

Additional

- Vincent Bell – tremolo guitar parts
- Angelo Badalamenti – synthesizers, orchestration and arrangement of synthesizers and additional guitars

==== Charts ====
Chart (1993)	Peak position
Finnish Singles (The Official Finnish Charts)	19
UK Singles (Official Charts)	53
US Mainstream Rock (Billboard)	38

== Shooting locations ==
Lynch and Frost started their location scouting in Snoqualmie on the recommendation of a friend of Frost. In the area, they found all of the locations that they had written into the pilot episode.

Recurring locations within the series filmed in the Snoqualmie area include various characters' homes, the Twin Peaks Sheriff's Department, the Double R Diner, the Great Northern Hotel, Big Ed's Gas Farm, and Twin Peaks High School.

In the pilot, the Mar-T Cafe (North Bend, Washington) served as the location for the Double R Diner. The producers then built a Hollywood soundstage set modeled on the Mar-T Cafe for the remaining interior scenes in seasons one and two.

After the series was cancelled, the cafe was sold to Kyle Twede, who renamed it Twede's Cafe. In 2000, arsonists set a fire that gutted the cafe. Twede's Cafe reopened in 2001 with a new interior that discarded many features of the original Double R Diner. In advance of season three (which was filmed on location), the producers paid to restore the cafe to its original appearance.

The exterior of The Great Northern Hotel is the Salish Lodge in Snoqualmie, WA. The hotel was originally inspired by the Kiana Lodge in Poulsbo, Washington. The Kiana Lodge was built in the late 1920s and is furnished with alder bentwood pieces dating from that era.
