= Andrea Hays =

American actress

- Born: Andrea Hays
- Known for: Heidi in Twin Peaks

Andrea Hays is an American actress, producer, screenwriter, costume designer, and nurse, best known for her role as Heidi in Twin Peaks which she played in the 1990 original series, the 2017 revival, Twin Peaks: The Return, and the 1992 prequel movie Twin Peaks: Fire Walk with Me (and Twin Peaks: The Missing Pieces).

== Career ==
She portrayed Heidi in every filmed incarnation of Twin Peaks.

In 2020, Entertainment Weekly selected Hays's character and laugh as one of the best moments of the original pilot episode, saying "her laugh is truly haunting" but "she seems like a nice person."

Her role in Twin Peaks effectively added bookends to the original series by being featured in the very first and very last episode, which are two of the most famous episodes. The choice by David Lynch to include the character and actress in key episodes and the movie, even bringing her back for the Season 2 finale despite the character not appearing in the original script, may elevate the role to more significance. All of her scenes are set in the Double R Diner.

She also appeared in the prequel movie, Twin Peaks: Fire Walk with Me (1992) and the feature-length deleted scenes compilation, Twin Peaks: The Missing Pieces, which was released in 2014.

She subsequently returned to the role over twenty-five years later, in 2017, appearing in several episodes of the revival series Twin Peaks: The Return.

Other film roles include Footloose (1984), playing Cheryl in Oedipal Breakfast (1995) and Pam in The Enquirers (1992), and Lily Babsin in The Houses October Built 2 (2017).

She also played Rossana in the Mexican telenovela Háblame de amor.

Short movie roles include Bowladrome (1984), Goodbye to All That (2021), Tess Tetley - Girl Brand Manager (2020), AFK (away from keyboard) (2018), Retch (2018), Out of Her Mind (2017).

She is playing Mayor Jan Tums in the 2021 web series Bazzooka.

She had a production company called Smarticle Productions and has played a variety of roles behind the camera, including costume designer, makeup, art department, writer, producer, and more on a wide variety of short movies including The Son, the Father (2017) by Lukas Hassel, which won Best Screenwriting at the HollyShorts Film Festival and The Lunchbox Brigade (2016), writing Miss Final Girl (2019), and many more.

== Personal life ==
She is also a nurse, specializing in dementia and hospice care.
