= Dale Cooper =

Twin Peaks character

- Twin Peaks character
- Kyle MacLachlan as Dale Cooper
- First appearance: "Pilot" (1990)
- Last appearance: "Part 18" (2017)
- Created by: David Lynch and Mark Frost
- Portrayed by: Kyle MacLachlan
- Duration: 1990–1991, 1992, 2017

In-universe information
- Gender: Male
- Occupation: FBI Special Agent
- Significant others: Annie Blackburn; Diane Evans
- Nationality: American
- Birth date: April 19, 1954

FBI Special Agent Dale Bartholomew Cooper is a fictional character and the protagonist of the ABC and Showtime television series Twin Peaks, who also plays a supporting role in the prequel film Twin Peaks: Fire Walk with Me. He is portrayed in all his appearances by American actor Kyle MacLachlan.

An idiosyncratic agent of the Federal Bureau of Investigation, Cooper arrives in Twin Peaks in 1989 to investigate the brutal murder of popular high school student Laura Palmer, and begins to uncover several bizarre mysteries around the town, including some supernatural ones.

== Concept and characteristics ==
Co-creator David Lynch named Cooper in reference to D. B. Cooper, the pseudonym of an unidentified man who hijacked a Boeing 727 aircraft on November 24, 1971.

MacLachlan has stated that he views Cooper as an older version of his character in Blue Velvet (1986), a previous David Lynch collaboration. "I see my character as Jeffrey Beaumont grown up. Instead of being acted upon, he has command on the world." Lynch has stated Cooper's character was developed as "a grown-up Jeffrey Beaumont".

Cooper displays an array of quirky mannerisms such as giving a "thumbs up" when satisfied, sage-like sayings, and distinctive sense of humor along with his love for a good cherry pie and a "damn fine cup of coffee" which he takes black. One of his persistent habits is recording spoken-word tapes to a mysterious woman called "Diane" into his microcassette recorder that he always carries with him, that often contain everyday observations and thoughts on his current case.

In an interview with Scouting magazine, Lynch said that Cooper is likely an Eagle Scout, the highest rank of the Boy Scouts of America (which incidentally Lynch also held), and that this is the root of Cooper's courteous yet determined nature and natural leadership skills. In the same interview, Lynch said that Sheriff Harry S. Truman was probably also a scout as a child, yet one that only made it to the rank of Life Scout, Scouting's second-highest rank.

== Character biography ==
During the second season of Twin Peaks, Simon & Schuster's Pocket Books division released several official tie-in publications that provide character details not covered in the show itself. Publications relevant to Cooper include The Autobiography of F.B.I. Special Agent Dale Cooper: My Life, My Tapes, which was written by Scott Frost, the brother of series co-creator Mark Frost; and Diane ... The Twin Peaks Tapes of Agent Cooper, an audiobook voiced by Kyle MacLachlan, which was nominated for a Grammy Award for Best Spoken-Word Performance.

=== Personal background and prequel film ===
Born on April 19, 1954, Dale Cooper grew up in Philadelphia and attended Germantown Friends School and Haverford College. After graduating from college and the FBI Academy, he joined the Federal Bureau of Investigation's Pittsburgh office, where he met his longtime secretary Diane Evans. His case partner was the older Windom Earle (Kenneth Welsh), who headed the Pittsburgh office. After Earle went insane, Cooper was transferred to the San Francisco office, the FBI counterintelligence unit, and an FBI-DEA drug cartel task force. Eventually, FBI Regional Bureau Chief Gordon Cole (David Lynch) inducted Cooper into his group that investigated the mysterious "Blue Rose" cases, along with Agent Albert Rosenfield (Miguel Ferrer) and Agent Chester Desmond (Chris Isaak).

Cooper is quirky and intellectual, with a profound interest in the mystical, particularly in Tibet and Native American mythology. Three years before the events of the original series, he had a dream about Tibet, which persuaded him that intuition and dreams could help him solve crimes by unconsciously finding patterns and narratives in scattered evidence. Some of his investigative techniques seem illogical and incomprehensible, but at times they appear to work.

Cooper's partnership with Windom Earle led to an early trauma in his career. Earle's wife, Caroline, was a witness to a federal crime. Earle and Cooper were assigned to protect her, which led to Cooper having an affair with her. However, one night, while in Pittsburgh, Cooper let his guard down, Earle stabbed Cooper and murdered Caroline in a jealous rage. Earle was subsequently sent to a mental institution. Cooper was devastated by the loss of the woman he would later refer to as the love of his life, and swore to never again get involved with someone who was a part of a case to which he was assigned.

In the prequel film Twin Peaks: Fire Walk with Me, Cooper is meeting with Cole when the long-missing Agent Phillip Jeffries (David Bowie) mysteriously appears and disappears in Cole's office. Cooper investigates the disappearance of Agent Desmond, who went missing while investigating the murder of Teresa Banks (Pamela Gidley). (Note: Scott Frost's 1991 tie-in book says that Cooper conducted the FBI's initial investigation into the murder of Teresa Banks, which is shown in the first act of Fire Walk with Me. However, Kyle MacLachlan requested that his role be downsized in the film, so the character of Agent Desmond was created to substitute for him.) He finds only the words "Let's Rock" written on the windshield of Desmond's car. Later, Cooper tells Diane that he suspects Teresa's murderer will strike again. He offers Rosenfield a victim profile that fits Laura, but Rosenfield is skeptical of Cooper's predictions since they were based on dreams and responds that the profile fits too many people to be useful.

=== Events of the original Twin Peaks series ===
At the start of season one, on February 24, 1989, Cooper comes to the town of Twin Peaks to investigate the murder of Laura Palmer (Sheryl Lee). Initially, the prime suspect is Laura's boyfriend Bobby Briggs (Dana Ashbrook), but Cooper quickly determines he is innocent. Cooper meets Phillip Gerard (Al Strobel), a one-armed shoe salesman who is possessed by a potentially benevolent spirit called MIKE; MIKE tells him that an evil spirit, BOB (Frank Silva), is the key to solving Laura's murder. Eventually, Cooper deduces that Laura's father, Leland (Ray Wise), murdered her while possessed by BOB. When BOB forces Leland to commit suicide, Cooper helps him transition into the afterlife by reciting a Buddhist prayer for the dead.

Cooper remains in Twin Peaks after solving the Palmer case, as the FBI soon suspends him for conducting police work across the Canadian border without authorization. Sheriff Truman deputizes him so that he can help the local police investigate other cases. While in Twin Peaks, he learns of the mysterious places called the Black Lodge and the White Lodge and the various spirits inhabiting them, including MIKE and The Man from Another Place (Michael J. Anderson). He also resolves to protect the town from Earle, who has become a serial killer and travels to Twin Peaks to confront him.

In the final episode of Twin Peaks, Cooper enters the Black Lodge to rescue his new girlfriend, Annie Blackburn (Heather Graham), from Earle. In the Black Lodge, he encounters his evil doppelgänger, who is in league with BOB. Earle appears and says he will let Annie go if Cooper gives him his soul. Cooper agrees, and Earle stabs him in the stomach. Seconds later, BOB appears and reverses time in the Lodge. BOB tells Cooper that Earle cannot ask for his soul, and then kills Earle and takes his soul. BOB then turns on Cooper, who flees, pursued by BOB and Cooper's doppelgänger. BOB allows Cooper's doppelgänger to leave the Black Lodge, while Cooper remains there. In the show's final scene, the doppelgänger smashes his head into a mirror and starts laughing hysterically; BOB's face looks back at him in the broken mirror.

=== Fire Walk with Me ===
Although Fire Walk with Me is primarily a prequel to the TV series and most of Cooper's participation in the film involves his pre-Twin Peaks self, the post-season two version of Cooper briefly appears in the film. Laura dreams of the Red Room and meets Cooper, who is still trapped in the Black Lodge. Cooper implores her not to take "the ring", a mysterious object that gives its wearer a sort of connection to the Black Lodge. At the end of the film, however, Laura puts on the ring, which prompts BOB to kill her. Afterwards, Cooper comforts Laura's spirit in the Red Room.

The film also confirms that the version of Dale Cooper who laughs during the final scene of season two is not the real Dale Cooper. Laura has a vision of a bloody Annie Blackburn beside her in her bed, who tells her: "My name is Annie. I've been with Dale and Laura. The good Dale is in the Lodge, and he can't leave. Write it in your diary." The police discover these diary pages 25 years later, in Twin Peaks: The Return.

=== 2017 revival ===
Twenty-five years after the events of the original series, Cooper remains trapped in the Black Lodge, while his doppelgänger continues to assume his identity in the natural realm. An older Laura Palmer whispers something in his ear, which cannot be heard.

After traversing a series of surrealist landscapes, Cooper is finally able to return to the natural realm, with help from entities both inside and outside of the Black Lodge, as well as Diane (Laura Dern) in her Naido form. Although it is asserted that Cooper's doppelgänger must leave the natural realm for Cooper to reenter, the doppelgänger manages to frustrate the process. Cooper replaces Douglas "Dougie" Jones, a Las Vegas insurance agent who looks like an overweight version of Cooper, instead of his doppelgänger. The doppelgänger appears to believe that once he kills Cooper-as-Dougie, he will be able to stay in the natural realm indefinitely. He frames Dougie for denying a valid $30 million insurance claim filed by two gangsters and orders corrupt businessman Duncan Todd (Patrick Fischler) to have Dougie assassinated.

After reentering the natural realm, Cooper (universally mistaken for Dougie) is left in a near-catatonic state. He cannot perform basic tasks without assistance and rarely speaks besides repeating words other people say. Only slight traces of Cooper's personality appear, such as his passion for coffee and cherry pie. Dougie's wife Janey-E (Naomi Watts) does not understand the situation, but provides cover stories for Cooper with the police and Dougie's boss Bushnell Mullins (Don Murray).

Although Cooper is essentially helpless on his own, he survives with help from supernatural forces from the Black Lodge, who help him win at slots to pay off Dougie's debt to loan sharks and inspire him to unconsciously expose a corrupt insurance agent in Dougie's office. Janey-E, who is frustrated by Dougie's whoring, gambling, and mounting debts, is pleased to see that Cooper, even in his diminished state, does not actively undermine his own life and is in much better physical shape than before. She does not question the change and grows more attracted to the man she thinks is Dougie. When the doppelgänger frames Dougie for the insurance fraud, Rodney and Bradley Mitchum (Robert Knepper and James Belushi), the gangsters who filed the valid insurance claim, plan to murder Cooper. However, the Black Lodge sends Bradley Mitchum a dream saying that Cooper is innocent. After Cooper pays the insurance claim, the Mitchums become fast friends with Cooper's family. In addition, a man ordered by Todd to assassinate Cooper cracks and cannot bring himself to commit the crime.

Cooper eventually starts to come out of his near-catatonic state after hearing Gordon Cole's name spoken while watching the film Sunset Boulevard. (Lynch named the Gordon Cole character in the series after the character in the film.) Hearing the name prompts Cooper to stick a fork into an electrical socket, electrocuting himself. Although the shock puts him in a coma, he awakens with his senses and memories intact. The Mitchum brothers fly him back to Twin Peaks.

Although Cooper's doppelgänger arrives at the Twin Peaks sheriff's station before Cooper himself, Lucy Brennan (Kimmy Robertson) detects and shoots the doppelgänger. BOB emerges from the doppelgänger's body and tries to terrorize the other characters, but James Hurley's friend Freddie Sykes (Jake Wardle) kills BOB with a powerful weapon in the form of a garden glove provided by the Fireman. Cooper returns his doppelgänger's spirit to the Black Lodge. Naido, who was transported to the natural realm through a strange portal in the woods and taken to the sheriff's station for protection, transforms back into Diane.

With BOB and the doppelgänger defeated, Cooper visits Phillip Jeffries (Nathan Frizzell), who sends him to the night of Laura Palmer's death and warns of a malevolent spirit named JUDY. Cooper prevents Laura's murder, but while leading Laura away from the murder site, she suddenly disappears.

Using information given to Cooper by the Fireman, Cooper and Diane travel to Odessa, Texas in search of Laura. They break through a kind of portal, after which Cooper appears colder, like a mixture between his regular personality and his doppelgänger. Diane is terrified after seeing a woman who may be her own doppelgänger. Cooper and Diane make love in a motel, during which Diane grows increasingly disturbed. When Cooper wakes up the next morning, Diane is gone; the motel is different; and a "Linda" has left "Richard" a note telling him that their relationship is over. The Fireman had previously told Cooper to watch for Linda and Richard.

After investigating a lead at the "Eat at Judy's" diner in Odessa, Cooper finds a woman who resembles an older Laura, but identifies herself as Carrie Page (Lee). Carrie does not know a Laura Palmer but recognizes the names of Laura's parents, which convinces Cooper that she is Laura. Cooper convinces Carrie, who needs to flee Odessa anyway, to travel to Twin Peaks to reunite with Sarah Palmer. Upon arriving at the Palmer house, however, Cooper discovers that the house has been occupied by two different families for many year. As Cooper asks what year he is in, Carrie hears Sarah calling for Laura. Carrie screams and the lights in the house go out.

The series ends with an image of Laura whispering in a startled Cooper's ear in the Red Room, a flashback to a scene in the season opener of the third season. While this indicates Laura's words relate to the closing moments of the series, unlike similarly in the original series, her message to Cooper is left forever unrevealed to the audience.

== Relationships ==
=== Town of Twin Peaks ===
Upon his arrival in Twin Peaks, Cooper is enchanted with the place and forms an instant rapport with many of the townspeople—most particularly Sheriff Harry S. Truman and his deputies, Deputy Tommy "Hawk" Hill and Deputy Andy Brennan (Harry Goaz). While Truman is initially skeptical of Cooper's unconventional investigation methods and other-worldly ideas, he is most often willing to accept Cooper's judgment. Over time, a deep bond emerges between the two; Truman even deputizes Cooper during the latter's brief suspension from the FBI.

On arrival to Twin Peaks, Cooper becomes quickly aware that 18-year-old Audrey Horne (Sherilyn Fenn), the daughter of local businessman Benjamin Horne (Richard Beymer), has a crush on him. Cooper is clearly attracted to Audrey, but he is quick to rebuff her advances when she turns up in his hotel bed. Cooper explains she is too young, but he does genuinely want to be her friend. Following her rescue, there remains a close and affectionate friendship with the two, most notably when Audrey arrives to his hotel room for comfort following her father's arrest and her sad farewell when she believes Cooper is leaving Twin Peaks for good. Audrey later gives Cooper a kiss when she discovers evidence that clears him of drug charges, and they later dance at the Milford wedding.

Following his reinstatement to the FBI, Cooper meets Annie Blackburn, the sister of Norma Jennings (Peggy Lipton), and falls in love with her. Annie is established as being a kindred spirit, experiencing the world with curiosity and wonder. Much like Cooper's pain over Caroline Earle, Annie also nurses a broken heart from someone in her past. Cooper helps her to prepare for participation in the Miss Twin Peaks contest. However, during the contest she is kidnapped by Earle, who takes her to the Black Lodge and uses her fear to open the gateway.

=== FBI ===
Cooper is a good friend of Agent Albert Rosenfield, an abrasive and sarcastic scientific expert whose help Cooper frequently enlists for complicated autopsies and other scientific questions. Though he has strong respect and admiration for Rosenfield's medical skills, he is alarmed by Rosenfield's growing animosity towards Sheriff Truman and the other town citizens, as Rosenfield has a low opinion of local policemen and small cities. He encourages Rosenfield to treat other people with respect and Sheriff Truman to not get too offended by Rosenfield's brusque manner. He eventually helps Rosenfield and Truman develop mutual respect for each other. Cooper also maintains good relations with his boss Gordon Cole and former FBI coworker Denise Bryson, both of whom help Cooper at critical junctures in the series.

Prior to Twin Peaks, Cooper's strongest romantic relationship was his affair with Caroline Earle, the wife of his former investigative partner, Windom Earle. Caroline had been under Cooper and Earle's protection for witnessing a federal crime Earle committed when he lost his mind, but on one night when Cooper's guard was down, Caroline was murdered by Windom. Caroline's death and his failure to protect her continues to haunt Cooper on his arrival to Twin Peaks, referring to a "broken heart" when discussing women with Truman and his deputies.

== Saturday Night Live appearance ==
In 1990, at the height of Twin Peaks' popularity, MacLachlan hosted the season opener of Saturday Night Live. The episode frequently referenced the series. In MacLachlan's opening monologue, he pretends to spoil the mystery of who killed Laura Palmer ("Yeah, it's Shelly the Waitress"). David Lynch calls him on set to berate him, after which an embarrassed MacLachlan unconvincingly attempts to walk back his claim.

One sketch explicitly parodies the show, with MacLachlan reprising his performance as Dale Cooper. The basic joke of the sketch is that MacLachlan has fallen in love with the town of Twin Peaks and will come up with any excuse he can to prolong the investigation and avoid going back to Philadelphia. Although Sheriff Harry S. Truman (Kevin Nealon) informs Cooper that Leo Johnson (Chris Farley) has confessed to the murder of Laura Palmer and that he can go home, Cooper remains in denial about Johnson's guilt, attributing his skepticism to a dream he had the night before in which "a hairless mouse with a pitchfork sang a song about caves." The Cooper sketch accentuates some of the quirkier aspects of Cooper's personality, including his tendency to ramble when recording messages for Diane and his unusual attention to detail, including the precise number of hairs he found in his shower the night before.

Cooper grows distressed when several town residents, played by SNL cast members, visit him to say goodbye. Audrey Horne (Victoria Jackson) gives Cooper a going away gift and ties the ribbon with her tongue, parodying a scene from the show. Leland Palmer (Phil Hartman) asks Cooper to dance with him. Nadine Hurley (Jan Hooks) asks Cooper to take her silent drape runners to the patent office. After Sheriff Truman observes that two women have already appeared and SNL has only two female cast members, The Log Lady (also played by Hooks) shows up. Seeking to delay his departure, Cooper asks Truman to perform several pointless and esoteric investigative tasks, including going to a graveyard at midnight disguised as altar boys.

As everyone begins to leave, Cooper declares that he cannot leave because he still does not know who shot him at the end of Season One. However, Deputy Andy Brennan (Conan O'Brien) drags Leo Johnson to meet Cooper. Leo confesses to shooting Cooper and reminds him that Cooper watched him do it. Cooper reluctantly goes to sleep as The Man from Another Place (Mike Myers) begins to dance at the foot of his bed.
