= Walter Olkewicz =

American actor (1948–2021)

- Walter Olkewicz in Seinfeld
- Born: May 14, 1948; Bayonne, New Jersey, U.S.
- Died: April 6, 2021 (aged 72); Los Angeles, California, U.S.
- Other name: Ray Holland
- Occupation: Actor
- Years active: 1976–2017
- Children: 1

Walter Olkewicz (May 14, 1948 – April 6, 2021) was an American character actor. He is perhaps best-known for his role as Jacques Renault, a suspect in the murder of Laura Palmer, in the first season of Twin Peaks. He also played Marko in the short-lived TV series Wizards and Warriors and Coach Wordman in the feature film Making the Grade.

== Biography ==
Olkewicz was born in Bayonne, New Jersey, and attended a Catholic grammar school there and St. Peter's Preparatory School in Jersey City before graduating from Bayonne High School in 1965. He continued his education at Saint Mary of the Plains College in Dodge City, Kansas and at Colorado State University. During his high-school years, he was active in plays. Before he began acting professionally, Olkewicz sold insurance, sold office supplies, and drove a taxi.

Early in his career, Olkewicz acted with improv and other groups. He co-founded the improvisational group Saturday Bath, which had a national tour that lasted more than a year. Originally billed as Ray Holland, He appeared in the films Futureworld (1976), The Greatest (1977), Summer Camp (1979), Hot T-Shirts (1981), Circle of Power (1981), and The Client (1994).

Olkewicz guest-starred in many TV shows, including Barney Miller (two episodes), Night Court, Seinfeld, ER, and Who's the Boss?. He was a semi-regular performer on Dolly Parton's 1987–88 variety show Dolly! and played the key role of Dougie Boudreau in the first four seasons of Grace Under Fire. In 1990, he played Jacques Renault on Twin Peaks, where he was considered a key suspect in the murder of the show's central character, Laura Palmer.

== Death ==
Olkewicz died at his Reseda, California, home after a long illness on April 6, 2021, at age 72. His son, Zac Olkewicz, is a screenwriter. During the time of his illness, he crafted a series of YouTube videos reaching out to all of his friends from his years of work, hoping that someone he knew would help him. The video messages were posted as being meant for Steven Spielberg, Danny DeVito, Dolly Parton, Tommy Lee Jones, and John Goodman, among many others. He spoke of his illness and struggling to get back into work, the pain that he was in, and his substantial number of knee surgeries (19 at that point as he states), as well as his resulting insurance-related financial losses. In his message to John Larroquette, he said he had been out of work for approximately 12 years because he was too sick to go on, with the exception of two episodes of the 2017 revival of Twin Peaks. His final video was posted as "Message to Sam Elliott."

== Filmography ==
=== Film ===
Year	Title	Role	Notes
1976	Futureworld	Chief Technician	
1977	The Greatest	Reporter	
1977	Can I Do It... 'Til I Need Glasses?	Himself	
1979	Summer Camp	"Horse"	
1979	1941	Private Hinshaw	
1981	Circle of Power	Buddy Gordon	
1982	Jimmy the Kid	Kelp	
1984	Making the Grade	Coach Wordman	
1984	Heartbreakers	Marvin	
1989	The Big Picture	Babe Ruth	
1992	Twin Peaks: Fire Walk with Me	Jacques Renault	
1994	The Client	Jerome "Romey" Clifford	
1995	The Surgeon	Dr. Meade	
1995	Stuart Saves His Family	Larry Skoog	
1996	Big Packages	Richie	
1996	Raven	Bernie DeFrewd	
1997	In Dark Places	Vendor	
1998	How to Make the Cruelest Month	Professor	
1998	Milo	Jack Wyatt	
1998	Suicide, the Comedy		
1999	You Know My Name	Mr. Killian	
1999	You're Killing Me...	Embalmer	
2000	Meeting Daddy	"Dink" Branson	
2001	Last Days	Warden Phillips	
2002	Par 6	Walt Hegelman	

=== Television ===
Year	Title	Role	Notes
1978	The Rockford Files	Mac Amodeus	Episode: "The Jersey Bounce"
1979	Hart to Hart	Longshoreman #2	Episode: "Hit Jennifer Hart"
1979–1980	The Last Resort	Zach Comstock	15 episodes
1980	Enola Gay: The Men, the Mission, the Atomic Bomb	Sergeant "Shug" Crawford	Television film
1980, 1983	Taxi	Tom Caldwell	2 episodes
1981	Alice	Sonny Santini	Episode: "Vera Goes Out on a Limb"
1981–1982	Barney Miller	William Krebs / Walter Cushing	2 episodes
1982	It's a Living	Dan	Episode: "Falling in Love Again"
1982	The Executioner's Song	Pete Galovan	Television film
1982	The Blue and the Gray	Private Grundy	Episode: "Part 2"
1983	Wizards and Warriors	Marko	8 episodes
1983	Travis McGee	Wright Fletcher	Television film
1983	Cheers	Wally Bodell	Episode: "They Called Me Mayday"
1983	The Love Boat	Leonard Gluck	Episode: "Dee Dee's Dilemma/Julie's Blind Date/The Prize Winner"
1984–1987	Family Ties	Various Characters	3 episodes
1984	Calamity Jane	Will Lull	Television film
1984	The Duck Factory	"Bumps" Carmichael	Episode: "The Children's Half Hour"
1984	Partners in Crime	Harmon Shain	12 episodes
1985	Newhart	Mr. Thurman	Episode: "My Fair Larry"
1985	Trapper John, M.D.	Dr. Harry Denmore	Episode: "Go for Broker"
1985	I Had Three Wives	Johnny Shore	Episode: "You and I Know"
1985	Hollywood Beat	Harvey Minick	Episode: "The Long Weekend"
1985–1986	Tall Tales & Legends	Van Epps / Zeke	2 episodes
1985	The A-Team	Joe Skrylow	Episode: "There Goes the Neighbourhood"
1985	Riptide	Robin Loxley / Robin Duncan	Episode: "Robin and Marian"
1985	227	Eddie	Episode: "The Big Piano Play-Off"
1986	Hardcastle and McCormick	Conyo	Episode: "In the Eye of the Beholder"
1986	Many Happy Returns	Darryl Webb	Television film
1986	Throb	Perry Mason	Episode: "Our Song"
1986	Designing Women	Mason Dodd	Episode: "A Big Affair"
1986	Falcon Crest	Dancer	3 episodes
1986–1992	Night Court	Various Characters	5 episodes
1987	Shell Game	Norman Van Delken	Episode: "Norman's Parking Ticket"
1987	Stillwatch	Sid Sherman	Television film
1987	Married... with Children	Violinist	Episode: "Sixteen Years and What Do You Get"
1987–1992	Who's the Boss?	"Tiny" McGee	4 episodes
1987	Moonlighting	Leon Summers	Episode: "Tale in Two Cities"
1987	The Charmings	Henry Giant	Episode: "The Charmings and the Beanstalk"
1987–1989	Mr. Belvedere	Alan	2 episodes
1987–1988	Dolly	Bubba	10 episodes
1988	L.A. Law	Mr. Hartvig	Episode: "Full Marital Jacket"
1988	We Got It Made	Orville	Episode: "Mickey Times Two"
1988	Baja Oklahoma	Private Eye	Television film
1989	Full Exposure: The Sex Tapes Scandal	Lenny Coles	Television film
1989	Everybody's Baby: The Rescue of Jessica McClure	Police Officer Andy Glasscock	Television film
1989	Wiseguy	Jacobson	Episode: "Sins of the Father"
1989	Open House	Stan	Episode: "In Vegas... with Showgirls!: Part 1"
1989	Murder, She Wrote	Howard	Episode: "When the Fat Lady Sings"
1990	Twin Peaks	Jacques Renault	3 episodes
1990	Matlock	The Bartender	Episode: "No Where To Turn"
1990	Bagdad Cafe	Bobby	Episode: "City On A Hill"
1990	The Flash	Callahan	Episode: "Shroud of Death"
1991	Life Goes On	Nathan	Episode: "Arthur"
1991	Brooklyn Bridge	"Happy" Felton	Episode: "Boys of Summer"
1992	Love & War	Claude Renais	Episode: "Monday, Monday"
1993	Batman: The Animated Series	Carmine Falcone (voice)	2 episodes
1993	Route 66	George Wilton	Episode: "Everybody's a Hero"
1993–1996	Grace Under Fire	Dougie Boudreau	48 episodes
1995	The Good Old Boys	"Fat" Gervin	Television film
1996	Seinfeld	Nick	Episode: "The Cadillac"
1997	Profiler	Sanitorum Director	Episode: "Shattered Silence"
1997	Pronto	Jimmy "The Cap" Capotorto	Television film
1998	Michael Hayes	Albert Parker	Episode: "Mob Mentality"
1998	The Visitor	Ozzie Faulkner	Episode: "The Chain"
1998	The Wonderful World of Disney	Mr. Bloom	Episode: "Tourist Trap"
1998	Sliders	The Boss	Episode: "World Killer"
1998	Chicago Hope	Harry Zakovitch	Episode: "Austin, We Have a Problem"
1999	The Wayans Bros.	Ernie	Episode: "Saving Private Marlon"
1999	Beyond Belief: Fact or Fiction	Otto Schenkel	2 episodes
1999	Dharma & Greg	Howie	Episode: "Bed, Bath, And Beyond"
1999	G vs E	Gus Wine	Episode: "To Be or Not to be Evil"
2000	Arliss		Episode: "The Sum of the Parts"
2001	ER	Georgia's Man	Episode: "Surrender"
2002	Everwood	Mike O'Connell	Episode: "Turf Wars"
2017	Twin Peaks	Jean-Michel Renault	2 episodes

=== Video games ===
Year	Title	Role	Notes
1999	Emergency Room 2	Mike Roscope	
