= Laura Palmer =

Twin Peaks character

- Twin Peaks character
- Sheryl Lee as Laura Palmer
- First appearance: "Pilot" (1990)
- Last appearance: "Part 18" (2017)
- Created by: David Lynch; Mark Frost
- Portrayed by: Sheryl Lee
- Duration: 1990–1992, 2014, 2017

In-universe information
- Occupation: Student; Sales assistant Part-time waitress Sex worker Tutor
- Family: Palmer
- Significant others: Bobby Briggs; James Hurley
- Relatives: Leland Palmer (father); Sarah Palmer (mother); Beth Ferguson (maternal aunt); Donald Ferguson (maternal uncle); Maddy Ferguson (cousin)
- Religion: Episcopalian
- Nationality: American
- Date of birth: July 22, 1972
- Date of death: February 24, 1989

Laura Palmer is a fictional character who is the primary focus of the television series Twin Peaks (1990–1991; 2017), and the main protagonist of the prequel film Twin Peaks: Fire Walk with Me (1992). She was created by the series' creators Mark Frost and David Lynch, and is portrayed in all her appearances by Sheryl Lee.

A popular high school student in the town of Twin Peaks, Laura was brutally murdered in 1989, leading to a lengthy investigation into her complicated past spearheaded by FBI Special Agent Dale Cooper, including her possible connections to some of the town's supernatural forces.

== Appearances ==
=== In television ===
==== 1990–1991 original series ====
Laura (played by Sheryl Lee, who also played her cousin Maddy Ferguson) was well known and loved in Twin Peaks; she volunteered at Meals on Wheels, was her school's Homecoming Queen, and was (apparently) the darling of her parents, Sarah (Grace Zabriskie) and Leland (Ray Wise). However, the series gradually revealed that Laura led a double life: she was a cocaine addict, a victim of child sexual abuse, a fetish model, and briefly, a sex worker at One Eyed Jacks, a casino/brothel just north of the Canada–US border. Officially involved with Bobby Briggs (Dana Ashbrook), the high school football team captain, she was also engaged in a secret relationship with James Hurley (James Marshall). She also had sexual encounters with other Twin Peaks citizens, such as businessman Ben Horne (Richard Beymer) and trucker/drug dealer Leo Johnson (Eric Da Re).

The discovery of Laura's body in the pilot episode of Twin Peaks brings Special Agent Dale Cooper (Kyle MacLachlan) to investigate her death. Her murder and its effect on those around her propel the first season and the first eight episodes of the second season. Laura remains a prominent character afterward, as her death exposes many secrets related to her, and also, in some cases, unrelated, such as the Packard mill conspiracy. Laura also appears in Cooper's dreams, offering cryptic clues as to the identity of her killer.

Laura's first diary is uncovered in the first episode, but her second secret diary is not recovered until later. The secret diary contains passages suggesting that she had been sexually abused by a malevolent entity named Bob (Frank Silva) since she was a child. In her diary she referred to Bob as a friend of her father's.

In the prequel/sequel Fire Walk with Me, Laura's spirit makes the transition to the afterlife when an angel appears to her, showing that her nightmare is finally over.

During the second season, the identity of her murderer was revealed: her father, Leland, who had sexually abused her for years while being possessed by Bob. Before his death in police custody, Leland tells Cooper and the others that he had not been aware of his own actions during the times Bob possessed him. As Leland dies, Laura appears before him in a vision, and it is implied that she forgives him and welcomes him to the afterlife.

Laura appears inside the Black Lodge during the series finale, as both herself and an evil doppelgänger version.

==== 2017 revival series ====
Sheryl Lee reprised her role as Laura in the 2017 revival. In "Part 2", Laura Palmer removes her face to reveal a mysterious white light emanating from within her body. She is shortly whisked away by an unseen force. In "Part 8", a glowing orb containing Laura's portrait is sent to Earth in 1945 by the Fireman and Senorita Dido, shortly after the creation of Bob during the testing of the first nuclear bomb.

In "Part 17", Agent Cooper is sent back in time by Special Agent Phillip Jeffries and saves Laura on the night of her murder; the opening scenes of the first season are revisited thereafter, but Laura's iconic plastic-wrapped body is nowhere to be found. Laura herself disappears soon after, vanishing from Cooper's grasp as they stroll through the woods of Twin Peaks.

In the series finale, Cooper discovers that Carrie Page, a middle-aged woman who looks just like Laura Palmer, is living in an alternative reality in Odessa, Texas. Though skeptical of Cooper's claims of her past life as Laura, Carrie is eager to flee town, as there is a dead man in her living room with a bullet hole in his head. She accompanies Cooper to Washington state. Once they arrive at the Palmer residence, Carrie does not seem to recognize her supposed former home, and Cooper is shocked to find the "Tremond" family living there, having purchased the home from the previous owners, the Chalfonts. As Cooper begins to question the current year, Sarah Palmer's voice calls out "Laura" from the Palmer residence, and Carrie screams in horror.

=== In film ===
Laura is the protagonist of the prequel film Fire Walk with Me. The film depicts the last week of her life and the events leading up to her murder.

Laura is the high school homecoming queen and is best friends with Donna Hayward (Moira Kelly). Laura is addicted to cocaine and is cheating on her boyfriend, Bobby Briggs, with the biker James Hurley. After Laura realizes pages are missing from her secret diary, she gives the rest of the diary to Harold Smith (Lenny Von Dohlen), her agoraphobic friend.

She has a dream about entering the Black Lodge. Cooper and the Man from Another Place (Michael J. Anderson) appear in her dream. The Man from Another Place tells Cooper that he is "the arm" and offers Teresa's ring to Laura, but Cooper tells her not to take it. Laura finds Annie Blackburn (Heather Graham) next to her in bed, covered in blood. Annie tells Laura to write in her diary that "the good Dale" is trapped in the Lodge and cannot leave. When she wakes up, Laura sees the ring in her hand.

The next evening, Laura goes to the Bang Bang Bar to meet her drug connections and have sex with strangers. Unexpectedly, the normally chaste Donna shows up. They all go to the Pink Room. When she sees a topless Donna making out with a stranger, a distraught Laura takes her home and begs her friend to not become like her. The next morning, Leland drives Laura home. On the way home, Philip Gerard/Mike (Al Strobel), a one-armed man who is also possessed by a demon, pulls up alongside Leland's car and shouts at Leland that "the thread will be torn". He shows Teresa's ring to Laura, but she and Leland become frightened and drive away.

The next night, Bob comes through Laura's window and begins raping her, only to transform into Leland. The next morning she warns Leland to stay away from her. Upset, Laura uses more cocaine and has trouble concentrating at school. When Bobby realizes Laura was only using him to score cocaine, he breaks off their relationship. Subsequently, Laura breaks up with James, then goes to a cabin in the woods to have an orgy with Leo, One-Eyed Jack's poker dealer Jacques Renault (Walter Olkewicz), and prostitute Ronette Pulaski (Phoebe Augustine). Leland has followed her there; he watches from the window as Jacques ties up and rapes Laura. When Jacques exits the cabin, Leland attacks him, leaving him incapacitated. Leo finds Jacques unconscious and flees. Both girls are taken from the cabin by Leland to an abandoned train car. Laura asks Leland if he is going to kill her, but Bob appears and tells Laura he intends to possess her. Mike has tracked Leland/Bob to the train, but when Ronette tries to let him in, Leland beats her unconscious. Mike manages to throw in Teresa's ring. Laura puts it on, which prevents Bob from possessing her. Enraged, Leland/Bob stabs Laura to death. Leland/Bob places Laura's body in the lake. As her corpse drifts away, Leland/Bob enters the Red Room, where he encounters Mike and the Man from Another Place, who announce they want their share of "garmonbozia", a supernatural substance generated by pain and fear.

As Laura's body is found by the Sheriff's department, Cooper comforts her spirit in the Black Lodge. An angel appears before them and Laura begins to weep with joy.

Laura is the protagonist of the 2014 film Twin Peaks: The Missing Pieces, which features deleted scenes from Fire Walk with Me, pieced together to make a feature-length film.

=== In literature ===
==== The Secret Diary of Laura Palmer ====
The Secret Diary of Laura Palmer, written by Jennifer Lynch (David Lynch's daughter), was published in 1990. The novel portrays Laura falling into a world of prostitution and cocaine abuse, while maintaining the status quo as homecoming queen and high school student. Published during the summer between the original broadcasts of the first and second seasons, the book provided information regarding Laura's veiled personal life, including her knowledge of and/or relationship with Bob.

==== Laura's Ghost: Women Speak about Twin Peaks ====
Laura's Ghost, written by Courtenay Stallings, was published in 2020 and features interviews from Sheryl Lee, Grace Zabriskie, and Jennifer Lynch. The book examines Laura Palmer's character and her influence on pop culture and women's lives.

=== Other appearances ===
==== In merchandise ====
Funko has released Pop! vinyl and reaction figures of Laura wrapped in plastic and a Pop! vinyl figure of Laura's Black Lodge counterpart.

==== In popular culture ====
- The Marilyn Manson song called "Wrapped In Plastic" (1994) references Laura Palmer and samples audio from the 1991 finale.
- Finnish doom metal band Swallow the Sun has a song called "Ghost of Laura Palmer" on their album Ghosts of Loss, released in 2005.

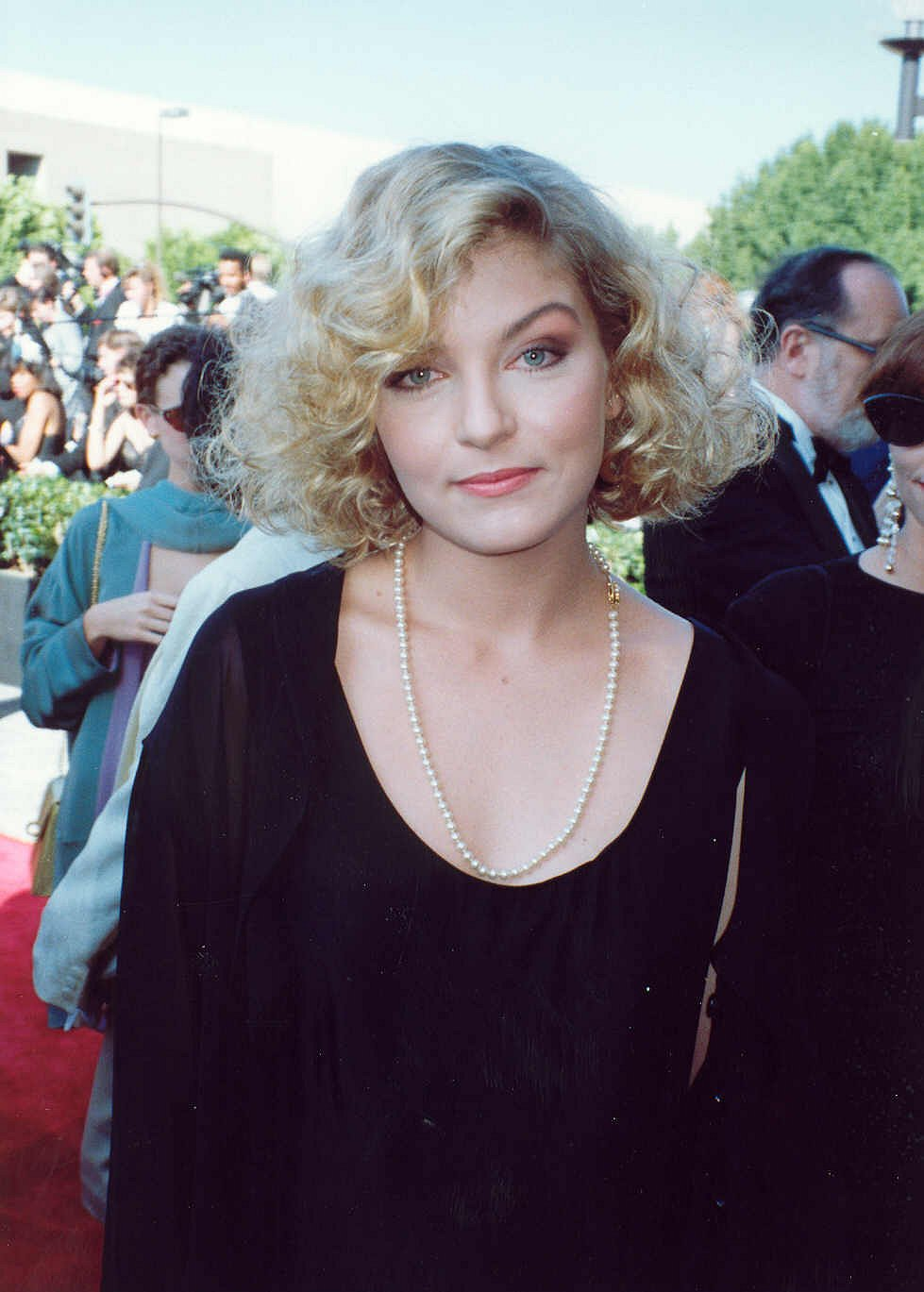
Sheryl Lee was cast as Laura.

- Canadian dance-punk band You Say Party released a single in 2010 titled "Laura Palmer's Prom" on the album XXXX. The music video, released in 2011, is an homage to Twin Peaks, with band members appearing as various characters from the series. The video's narrative traces the events leading up to Laura Palmer's murder.
- UK indie pop band Bastille released a song called "Laura Palmer" on their debut album.
- Finnish collaborative band Kerkko Koskinen Kollektiivi has a song called "Laura Palmer" on their debut album, released in 2012.
- The Amanda Palmer album Who Killed Amanda Palmer is an allusion to the series and the character.
- "The Decadence of Laura Palmer" song by Californian band The Gitas
- Skycamefalling wrote a song called "Laura Palmer" for the album 10.21.
- Russian band Splean mentions Laura Palmer in their song Beryllium off their 2004 album, Reversed Chronicle of Events.
- Serbian band Teatar mentions Laura Palmer in their song "Ne ja..." (Not me).
- Polish rapper Kartky mentions Laura Palmer in his song "Laura Palmer" which was released in 2018. Track appears on his album Blackout.
- South African music group COSMIC FIEND released a demo titled "Laura Palmer Scream" on October 27, 2021
- Producer louis blue releases song called "i miss laura" in October 2022, and accompanying music video using scenes from the Twin Peaks pilot.

== Development ==
=== Conception ===
Laura's murder was possibly inspired by the unsolved death of Hazel Irene Drew, who was found dead in Teal's Pond in Sand Lake, New York and the story of which Mark Frost was told by his grandmother Betty Calhoun. This story is told in David Bushman and Mark T. Givens' Murder at Teal's Pond: Hazel Drew and the Mystery That Inspired Twin Peaks (2022) which includes an introduction by Frost explaining the connection.

=== Casting ===
Due to budget constraints, Lynch intended to cast a local girl from Seattle, reportedly "just to play a dead girl". The local girl ended up being Sheryl Lee. Lynch stated "But no one—not Mark, me, anyone—had any idea that she could act, or that she was going to be so powerful just being dead." And then, while Lynch shot the home movie that James takes of Donna and Laura, he realized that Lee had something special. "She did do another scene—the video with Donna on the picnic—and it was that scene that did it." As a result, Sheryl Lee became a semi-regular addition to the cast, appearing in flashbacks as Laura, as well as Laura's cousin, Maddy Ferguson.
