= Lynch on Lynch =

Book of interviews with David Lynch

- Editor: Chris Rodley
- Author: David Lynch
- Language: English
- Genre: Non-fiction
- Publisher: Faber & Faber Limited
- Publication date: 1997
- Publication place: United Kingdom
- ISBN: 0-571-19548-2

Lynch on Lynch is a book of interviews with David Lynch, conducted, edited, and introduced by Chris Rodley, a filmmaker. The interviews took place between 1993 and 1996. Each chapter is devoted to a separate film, from his beginnings up to Lost Highway.

It was published by Faber & Faber Limited in London in 1997 (ISBN 0-571-19548-2). A revised edition was published by Farrar Straus & Giroux on March 16, 2005 (ISBN 0-571-22018-5)

== Table of contents ==
Acknowledgements, Introduction

1. Shadow of a Twisted Hand Across My House: Childhood, memory and painting
2. Garden in the City of Industry: From The Bride to The Grandmother
3. I See Myself: Eraserhead
4. A Bug Dreams of Heaven: Shed Building and The Elephant Man
5. Oww God, Mom, the Dog He Bited Me: Photography and Dune
6. She Wasn't Fooling Anyone, She Was Hurt and She Was Hurt Bad: Music and Blue Velvet
7. Suddenly My House Became a Tree of Sores: A Tale of Twin Peaks
8. It's a Great Big Wonderful World: Wild at Heart and Weird on Top
9. Ants in My House: Lost Highway
10. It's a Great Big World Revisited: The Straight Story
11. Billy Finds a Book of Riddles Right in His Own Back Yard: Mulholland Drive

Filmography, Bibliography, A Note on the Editor, Index
