= Robert Engels =

American film director

Robert Engels (born 1949) is an American writer, producer, director, and professor of screenwriting at Cal State Fullerton.

== Biography ==
He graduated from Saint John's Preparatory School in Collegeville, Minn. in 1967. He wrote several episodes of and produced Twin Peaks and also co-wrote the 1992 film Twin Peaks: Fire Walk with Me. He is also credited with writing and producing several other television series, such as seaQuest DSV and Gene Roddenberry's Andromeda. In 1993, he was nominated (with David Lynch) for a Saturn Award for best writing, for his work on Twin Peaks: Fire Walk with Me. His only on screen appearances (so far) have been on seaQuest during its first season as Malcolm Lansdowne.

== Filmography ==
Writer

- Wiseguy (3 episodes) (1990)
- Twin Peaks (10 episodes) (1990–1991)
- Twin Peaks: Fire Walk with Me (1992) (written by)
- On the Air (3 episodes) (1992)
- Sirens (1 episode) (1993)
- seaQuest DSV (2 episodes) (1994)
- The Adventures of Sinbad (2 episodes) (1997)
- Murder in Small Town X (unknown episodes) (2001)
- Matthew Blackheart: Monster Smasher (2002) (creator)
- Andromeda (8 episodes) (2002–2005)
- Greenleaf (1 episode) (2016)

Producer

- Twin Peaks (co-producer) (1990)
- On the Air (co-executive producer) (1992)
- seaQuest DSV (co-executive producer) (Season 1) (1993–1994)
- Andromeda (executive producer) (2002–2005)

Actor

- seaQuest DSV .... Malcolm Lansdowne (3 episodes) (1993–1994)
