= Episode 8 (Twin Peaks) =

- Twin Peaks episode
- The Giant visits Dale Cooper.
- Episode no.: Season 2 Episode 1
- Directed by: David Lynch
- Story by: Mark Frost; David Lynch
- Teleplay by: Mark Frost
- Production code: 2.001
- Original air date: September 30, 1990
- Running time: 94 minutes

Guest appearances
- Grace Zabriskie as Sarah Palmer; Chris Mulkey as Hank Jennings; Miguel Ferrer as Special Agent Albert Rosenfield; David Patrick Kelly as Jerry Horne; Wendy Robie as Nadine Hurley; Don Davis as Major Garland Briggs; Victoria Catlin as Blackie O'Reilly; Mary Jo Deschanel as Eileen Hayward; Catherine E. Coulson as Margaret Lanterman / "The Log Lady"; Al Strobel as Phillip Michael Gerard / "The One-Armed Man"; Carel Struycken as The Giant; Phoebe Augustine as Ronette Pulaski; Jessica Wallenfels as Harriet Hayward; Alicia Witt as Gersten Hayward; Hank Worden as The Elderly Room Service Waiter; Frank Silva as Killer BOB (uncredited)

Episode chronology
← Previous "Episode 7"	Next → "Episode 9"

"Episode 8", also known as "May the Giant Be with You", (Note: Although the series did not originally have episode titles, when it was broadcast in Germany, the episodes were given titles, which are now used by some fans and critics.) is the first episode of the second season of the American surrealist mystery horror drama television series Twin Peaks. The episode was written by series co-creators David Lynch and Mark Frost, and directed by Lynch. It features series regulars Kyle MacLachlan, Michael Ontkean, Ray Wise and Richard Beymer; and guest stars Grace Zabriskie as Sarah Palmer, Chris Mulkey as Hank Jennings, Miguel Ferrer as Albert Rosenfield, Don S. Davis as Major Garland Briggs, and Victoria Catlin as Blackie O'Reilly.

Twin Peaks centers on the investigation into the murder of schoolgirl Laura Palmer (Sheryl Lee), in the small rural town in Washington state after which the series is named. In this episode, Federal Bureau of Investigation (FBI) Special Agent Dale Cooper (MacLachlan) is visited by The Giant after being shot by an unknown assailant. After The Giant gives him clues and he has recovered, Cooper, Sheriff Truman (Ontkean), and FBI Special Agent Albert Rosenfield (Ferrer) continue to investigate Laura Palmer's murder with the aid of The Giant's clues. The town of Twin Peaks is in turmoil after a fire at The Packard Sawmill, which has left a number of people injured and others missing, Leo Johnson (Eric Da Re)'s attempted murder, Jacques Renault (Walter Olkewicz)'s murder, and Nadine Hurley (Wendy Robie)'s suicide attempt.

"Episode 8" was broadcast on September 30, 1990, on the American Broadcasting Company (ABC) and was watched by an audience of 19.1 million households in the United States, about 20 percent of the available audience. Critical response to the episode was largely positive.

== Plot ==
=== Background ===
The small town of Twin Peaks, Washington, has been shocked by the murder of schoolgirl Laura Palmer (Sheryl Lee) and the attempted murder of her friend Ronette Pulaski (Phoebe Augustine). FBI special agent Dale Cooper (Kyle MacLachlan) has been sent to the town to investigate. During the investigation, Cooper has been shot in his hotel room by an unknown assailant and Audrey Horne (Sherilyn Fenn) has begun working undercover at One Eyed Jacks, a brothel and casino on the Canadian-United States border, to gather information. In Twin Peaks, Leo Johnson (Eric Da Re) has been shot by Hank Jennings (Chris Mulkey), Jacques Renault (Walter Olkewicz) has been murdered by Leland Palmer (Ray Wise), and The Packard Sawmill has been burnt down.

=== Events ===
Dale Cooper lies on the floor of his hotel room after being shot in the stomach. In the background, Deputy Andy Brennan calls out for Cooper from the telephone and The Waiter (Hank Worden) enters Cooper's room. He places a glass of warm milk on the table, hangs up the telephone and cannot understand Cooper's request to call a doctor. He leaves the room and re-enters twice, giving Cooper a thumbs up. A mysterious, semi-transparent figure enters the room and The Giant (Carel Struycken) appears above Cooper. The Giant tells Cooper three things: "there is a man in a smiling bag", "the owls are not what they seem" and "without chemicals, he points." He asks Cooper for his ring and tells him he will return it to him when he discovers the meaning of his clues. He vanishes after giving a fourth clue: "Leo locked inside a hungry horse, there is a clue at Leo's house." After The Giant vanishes, Cooper begins recording a message into his tape recorder for Diane, revealing his dying wishes. During his speech, Sheriff Truman (Michael Ontkean), Deputy Hawk (Michael Horse) and Deputy Brennan enter Cooper's room with weapons drawn and bring him to the hospital.

At the hospital, Cooper awakes and learns of Jacques Renault's murder, Leo Johnson's attempted murder and the Packard Sawmill fire. He recovers and brings Sheriff Truman, Deputy Brennan and Hawk to Leo's house to search for clues. Hawk finds a blanket doused in gasoline and Truman concludes Leo started the Packard Sawmill fire. FBI Special Agent Albert Rosenfield (Miguel Ferrer) arrives at the scene and Deputy Brennan, while alerting Cooper, steps on a loose plank, revealing an abundance of cocaine.

Meanwhile, Audrey Horne is working undercover at One Eyed Jacks and realises her father, Ben Horne (Richard Beymer), is the owner. Audrey hides behind a mask and almost has a sexual encounter with her father before he is brought away by his brother Jerry (David Patrick Kelly). At the Palmer household, Madeline "Maddy" Ferguson (Lee) tells Sarah Palmer (Grace Zabriskie) of a dream she had. Leland Palmer enters the room, singing "Mairzy Doats", and both women are shocked to discover his hair has turned white overnight. Sarah leaves the room and Maddy has a vision of blood spewing across the living room carpet. Maddy later meets Donna Hayward (Lara Flynn Boyle) at the Double R Diner and tells her about Leland's hair and sudden upbeat mood. Donna is given an anonymous letter by Norma Jennings (Peggy Lipton) telling her to look into the Meals on Wheels program.

Back at the Twin Peaks Sheriff Department, Deputy Brennan discovers the answer to one of The Giant's clues, revealing Leo was locked in a jail in Hungry Horse, Montana on the night Theresa Banks—the girl murdered a year before Laura Palmer—was murdered. Laura's secret boyfriend James Hurley (James Marshall) brings Sheriff Truman a cassette tape of Laura speaking to Doctor Jacoby (Russ Tamblyn). At the hospital, Cooper and Truman question Jacoby about Laura and Jacques Renault's murders. While at the hospital, Cooper sees Jacques' bodybag, which appears to be smiling, yielding another answer to The Giant's clues. Bobby Briggs (Dana Ashbrook) visits Shelly Johnson (Mädchen Amick) in hospital and later visits his father, Major Garland Briggs, who shares a story of his vision with Bobby, bringing Bobby to tears. Sheriff Truman visits Pete Martell (Jack Nance) about Josie Packard (Joan Chen)'s disappearance following the mill fire. Ben and Jerry Horne question Hank Jennings about Leo's shooting. At One Eyed Jacks, Blackie O'Reilly, the brothel/casino's manager, berates Audrey Horne about not sleeping with the owner. During a dinner at the Haywards' home, Leland Palmer sings and suddenly collapses.

Later that night, Cooper is visited again by The Giant. The Giant informs him not to search for all of the answers to his clues at once and that "a path is formed by laying one stone at a time." He also informs Cooper "one person saw the third man" and he is known to Cooper. He ends his visit by telling Cooper that he forgot something. The Giant shines a light on Cooper and at the hospital, Ronette Pulaski enters a spasm in her coma. Ronette has flashback visions of Laura Palmer being murdered by BOB. After murdering Laura, BOB laughs maniacally.

== Production ==
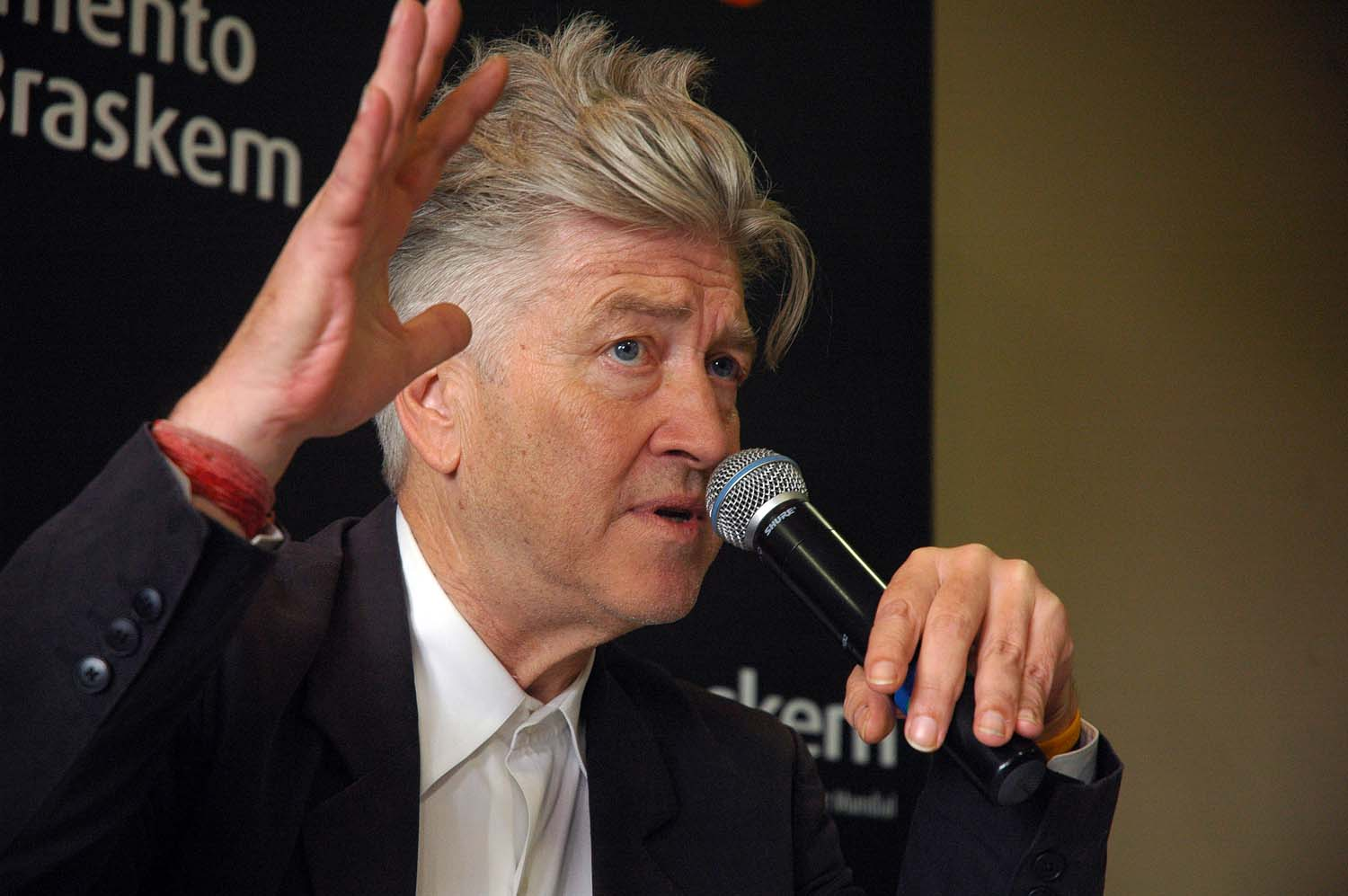
"Episode 8" was co-written and directed by David Lynch, one of the series co-creators.

"Episode 8" was written by the series creators Mark Frost and David Lynch. Frost and Lynch had co-written three prior episodes—"Pilot", "Episode 1" and "Episode 2". Lynch would later direct the following episode, "Episode 9", "Episode 14" and the series finale "Episode 29", and Frost co-wrote another four installments.

== Broadcast ==
"Episode 8" was originally broadcast on the American Broadcasting Company (ABC) network on September 30, 1990. The initial broadcast was watched by 19.1 million households in the United States—which represented 20 percent of the available audience and 12.2 percent of all households in the country. It was the most-viewed episode of Twin Peaks' second season and following its broadcast, the series ratings dropped a considerable amount—which led to its eventual cancellation. The following episode, "Episode 9", marked its decline, attracting 14.4 million households.

=== Reception ===
Critical response to the episode was largely positive. In his review for The A.V. Club, Keith Phipps noted that there were some moments "that are as strong as anything in the first season but right from the beginning it feels a little off. Even though David Lynch directs the double-length second-season premiere, it lacks the sustained intensity of the first season episodes." Phipps added that The Giant's first appearance to Cooper is "perversely unsatisfying" but criticised some of the episode's plotholes, giving it a B+ rating. AllRovi's Andrea LeVasseur has noted that "Episode 8" "features turning points for some major characters as well as several occurrences of supernatural visions", rating it four out of five stars. DVD Talk's Jamie S. Rich gave a mixed response and commented that after The Giant's appearance "we're off to the whacky races." Rich added that "almost immediately, however, one can sense creators David Lynch and Mark Frost starting to buckle under the weight of their own success. For their big return, they seem to be ratcheting up the weird to give the people what they want--more shots of donuts, more coffee, and even worse, they started to indulge more in goofball humor that didn't really play out all that well."
