= Laura's Ghost =

2020 book written by Courtenay Stalling

Laura's Ghost: Women Speak about Twin Peaks
- 2020 cover of Laura's Ghost
- Author: Courtenay Stallings
- Language: English
- Subject: Laura Palmer, Twin Peaks
- Genre: Cult literature, social criticism
- Publisher: Fayetteville Mafia Press
- Publication date: October 2020
- Publication place: United States
- Pages: 320
- ISBN: 978-1-949-02408-1

Laura's Ghost: Women Speak about Twin Peaks is a 2020 book by Courtenay Stallings. The book explores the legacy of the fictional character Laura Palmer, whose death was the precipitating event in the television show Twin Peaks. Laura's Ghost features interviews with and essays from women involved with Twin Peaks including Sheryl Lee, who played Laura Palmer, as well as actress Grace Zabriskie, and Jennifer Lynch, daughter of the series’ director David Lynch.

== Content ==
Laura's Ghost is an anthology of essays and interviews on the subject of Laura Palmer, a fictional character whose death sparked the events of the television show, Twin Peaks. Her body was found, wrapped in plastic, eight minutes into the series premiere and leads to the series' primary question, "Who killed Laura Palmer?". Laura begins the series as an idyllic American teenager, but, as the series progresses, Laura is revealed to have been a sex worker and involved in drug trafficking. Twin Peaks and, most explicitly, the 1992 film, Twin Peaks: Fire Walk with Me reveal Laura also experienced sexual abuse at the hands of her father, who murdered her and was possessed by an incorporeal evil spirit.

Contributors and interviewees to Laura's Ghost were women involved in the production of Twin Peaks including Sheryl Lee, who played Laura Palmer (as well as her cousin, Maddy Ferguson); Grace Zabriskie, who played Laura's mother, Sarah Palmer; Sabrina S. Sutherland, a producer on the show; and Jennifer Lynch, author of The Secret Diary of Laura Palmer and daughter of David Lynch. The book also includes an essay from writer and film critic Willow Catelyn Maclay and interviews with fans of Twin Peaks including Sezín Koehler and Mya McBriar, author of the Twin Peaks Fanatic blog. Laura's Ghost includes an essay by Samantha Weisberg about the life and death of her friend, therapist, writer, and Twin Peaks fan, Amie Harwick.

The book examines Laura Palmer's place in the Twin Peaks franchise and centres female experience in exploring the legacy of Laura Palmer. It includes explicit discussions of the franchise's depictions of sexual abuse, particularly in Twin Peaks and Twin Peaks: Fire Walk with Me.

== Development ==
Stallings began working on Laura's Ghost in 2016. She cites Roxane Gay as one of the book's influences. Stallings almost finished her first draft of the book in February 2020. Weisberg's essay on Amie Harwick was one of the last contributions to the book. Stallings says she "didn't set out looking for stories of trauma" in writing Laura's Ghost and compiling the interviews for it, but she found that, in discussing Laura Palmer, many fans shared their real-life traumatic experiences.

In choosing the book's cover image, Stallings was insistent that the image not be of Laura dead. Instead, the book's cover features a still from Twin Peaks of Laura in a flashback, before her character was murdered.

== Publication ==
Laura's Ghost was first published in 2020 by Fayetteville Mafia Press. A portion of the proceeds from the first edition were donated to the Rape, Abuse, & Incest National Network (RAINN).

== Awards and nominations ==
Year	Award	Category	Result	Ref.
2021	Stoker Awards	Superior Achievement in Non-Fiction	longlist	
