= Part 8 (Twin Peaks) =

- Twin Peaks episode
- The detonation of an atomic bomb as seen in the episode.
- Episode no.: Season 3 Episode 8
- Directed by: David Lynch
- Written by: David Lynch; Mark Frost
- Cinematography by: Peter Deming
- Editing by: Duwayne Dunham
- Original air date: June 25, 2017
- Running time: 58 minutes

Guest appearances
- Leslie Berger as New Mexico Wife; Robert Broski as Woodsman; Cullen Douglas as Disc Jockey; Erica Eynon as Experiment; Tikaeni Faircrest as Girl (Note: The series does not identify the girl; she is revealed to be Sarah Palmer in the novel Twin Peaks: The Final Dossier.); George Griffith as Ray Monroe; Tad Griffith as New Mexico Husband; Sheryl Lee as Laura Palmer (Note: These actors appear only in archival footage.); Xolo Maridueña as Boy; Joy Nash as Señorita Dido; Tracy Philips as Receptionist; Frank Silva as Killer BOB; JR Starr as MC; Carel Struycken as The Fireman (Note: In the episode's credits, Struycken's character was listed as "???????". His name was revealed as "The Fireman" in "Part 14".)

Episode chronology
← Previous "Part 7"	Next → "Part 9"

"Part 8", also known as "Gotta Light?", (Note: Episodes did not originally air with titles, but the promotional quotes for each episode were later used as titles in the Blu-ray release of this season) is the eighth episode of the third season of the American surrealist mystery-horror drama television series Twin Peaks. It was written by series creators Mark Frost and David Lynch, directed by Lynch, and stars Kyle MacLachlan. "Part 8" was first broadcast on June 25, 2017, on Showtime, and was watched by an audience of 246,000 viewers in the United States. The episode is composed of lengthy, surreal scenes, with very little dialogue throughout, and was largely shot in black and white. Critics and audiences overwhelmingly praised the episode for its visuals, sound design, tone, and thematic depth, though some viewers were perplexed by the episode's non-traditional storytelling.

== Plot ==
Gotta light?

— Woodsman (used as a promotional tagline for the episode)

=== Background ===
The small town of Twin Peaks, Washington, has been shocked by the murder of schoolgirl Laura Palmer (Sheryl Lee) and the attempted murder of her friend Ronette Pulaski (Phoebe Augustine). FBI special agent Dale Cooper (Kyle MacLachlan) has been sent to the town to investigate and has discovered that the killer was Laura's father, Leland Palmer (Ray Wise), who acted while possessed by a demonic entity—Killer BOB (Frank Silva). At the end of the original series, Cooper was trapped in the Black Lodge, an extra-dimensional place, by BOB, who let out Cooper's doppelgänger to use him as his physical access to the world. Twenty-five years after those events, Cooper manages to escape the Lodge through a portal between worlds; during this process, he was supposed to replace the doppelgänger, but instead he takes the place of a second doppelgänger (known as Dougie Jones), fabricated by the first as a patsy for the exchange. Cooper's doppelgänger, exhausted from the process, crashes his car and passes out, allowing the police to capture him; at the station, he uses the information in his possession to blackmail Warden Murphy (James Morrison) into releasing him and his partner, Ray Monroe (George Griffith).

=== Events ===
Monroe and Cooper's doppelgänger are traveling in a car Murphy prepared for their escape. Using his phone, the doppelgänger spots several trackers on the car, which he sends to a nearby truck to confuse the wardens. When the doppelgänger asks him whether he wants to go to "the farm", Ray responds affirmatively; when asked about Darya's fate, the doppelgänger lies and tells Ray that she's still alive, awaiting their call. On their way through, Ray stops to urinate; the doppelgänger uses this occasion to attempt to extort the information he was seeking from him, and, when he refuses to cooperate, tries to kill him, but the gun provided by Warden Murphy has had the firing pin removed and does not work.

Ray then shoots the doppelgänger twice, but as he is preparing to deliver his final hit, ghostly men (the "woodsmen") appear and begin to tear at the doppelgänger's body, revealing an orb that emerges from his wound with Killer BOB's grinning face within. Other ghostly figures run circles around Ray in a ritualistic manner, prompting Ray to flee, terrified; on his drive away, he sends Phillip Jeffries a message that the doppelgänger may have survived the attack. In the Roadhouse, an MC (JR Starr) introduces "the" Nine Inch Nails; the group performs their song "She's Gone Away". Later, the doppelgänger awakens where he lay, seemingly fully restored.

In 1945 New Mexico, the first atomic bomb is detonated. Woodsmen circle around and inside a building labeled "convenience store" that appears burnt out. Floating in a void, the Experiment (Erica Eynon), a white humanoid form, spews a stream of primordial/ectoplasmic fluid; among various ova in the fluid one darker globule has BOB's visage. Red and gold imagery follows like burning embers, a fireworks radiation of atomic energy. In an imposing windowless building atop a craggy outcrop amid a purple sea, Señorita Dido (Joy Nash) sits next to a metallic-bell shaped machine, listening to a phonograph. When the machine begins to buzz loudly, the Fireman (Carel Struycken) enters, inspects the machine, switches the siren off, then moves upstairs to a room like a small vintage movie theatre with a film projector. The Fireman watches as images from the detonation, the convenience store, and the Experiment sprouting BOB play on the screen. He then begins to levitate, light and tendrils of energy emanating from his head like a forming galaxy, as stars are projected onscreen. Señorita Dido enters, and the Fireman emits a golden crystal/light orb containing Laura Palmer's face; the orb floats down to her. After kissing the orb, she sends it to Earth (which appears on the screen) through a golden tube contraption emanating from the whirring luminaire ceiling.

In 1956 New Mexico, an unearthly amphibi-insectoid creature hatches from an egg on the bomb's explosion site and crawls through the desert. A boy (Xolo Maridueña) and a girl (Tikaeni Faircrest) pass a gas station as he walks her home from a date; the girl finds a face-up penny and contemplates the good luck it might bring. Two woodsmen manifest and descend on a rural road, stopping a couple's (Tad Griffith and Leslie Berger) car. One woodsman (Robert Broski), cigarette in hand, repeatedly asks them, "Got a light?", which prompts them to flee, terrified. Meanwhile, the young couple reaches the girl's home; they share a brief first kiss before she walks in and he departs elated. The Woodsman enters a radio station. He asks the receptionist (Tracy Phillips) for a "light", then crushes her skull, killing her instantly; overpowering the disc jockey (Cullen Douglas) and dislodging The Platters single "My Prayer", he repeatedly broadcasts the words: "This is the water and this is the well. Drink full and descend. The horse is the white of the eyes and dark within." During the broadcast, numerous listeners fall unconscious, including the young girl, through whose room's open window the creature enters and climbs down her throat. The woodsman kills the disc jockey with another one-handed skull crush and leaves. As he walks into the desert, the neighing of a horse can be heard.

== Production ==
=== Writing ===
"Part 8", like the rest of the limited series, was written by Mark Frost and David Lynch. Of the writing of this episode, Frost said:

The idea, obviously—or, well, not obviously—was that we'd never done anything close to what you might describe as a Twin Peaks origin story, [showing] where this pervasive sense of darkness and evil had come from. On the page, we wrote it in great detail. I think it was maybe 12, 15 pages. But as we were putting down the descriptions, I knew David was going to take that as the blueprint for something extraordinary. He ran with it and elevated it to a whole other level [...] the atomic explosion was probably half a page as written, but I knew that, in David's hands, it could run as long as 10 or 12 minutes, and it would be riveting. It was certainly a narrative departure from what we had done before. There was no question about that. But it needed to stand apart, and it needed to blow your mind. So mission accomplished.

In his autobiography Room to Dream, Lynch called the insectoid creature a "frog-moth", and said the idea for it came from his travel in Europe with Jack Fisk during the mid-1960s:

[T]he frog-moth [...] came from Yugoslavia. When Jack and I were in Europe, we caught the Orient Express in Athens to take us back to Paris, so we're going up through Yugoslavia and it's really, really dark. At a certain point the train came to a stop and there was no station but we could see people getting off the train. [...] When I got off the train I stepped into this soft dust that was like eight inches deep and it was blowing, and out of the earth these huge moths, like frogs, were leaping up, and they'd fly and flip and go back down again. So that was the frog-moth—things just sort of show up in the world of Twin Peaks.

On May 9, 2018, a page from the episode's script was shown in a documentary about Dean Hurley, the series' sound designer. The page (numbered 195) translates on-screen to the woodsman breaking inside the radio station: differently from the final cut, the spelling of the episode's titular line was "Got a light?" and the woodsman was supposed to "speak disturbing, atonal word-like mechanical sounds into the mic, going out over the air in a strange monotone", part of which composed the mantra that was performed in the final episode. The page does not resemble the script the cast members received.

=== Filming ===
"Part 8" was directed by Lynch, who had also directed the rest of the limited series and six episodes of the original series—the "Pilot", "Episode 2", "Episode 8", "Episode 9", "Episode 14" and "Episode 29". The scenes inside the Fireman's house were filmed inside the Tower Theatre in Los Angeles, a location Lynch had used in Mulholland Drive (2001). On set, Lynch showed Joy Nash how to hold the Laura Palmer orb, kissing it and giving it "so much love" before letting it go; he also demonstrated to her how to walk through the theatre, with bouncing steps like a "little cherub." The scenes at KPJK were filmed in a specially constructed set in New Mexico. Upon visiting the set for the first time, Lynch said that he had envisioned a simple set for one shot, but instead they had built an authentic radio station, which he joked could be on the air by the following week.

=== Music ===
Almost every episode of the 2017 Twin Peaks series features a live performance by a band at the Roadhouse. In this episode, American rock band Nine Inch Nails performed "She's Gone Away" (2016). Nine Inch Nails frontman Trent Reznor collaborated with Lynch on the soundtrack for Lost Highway (1997), and Lynch directed the video for the Nine Inch Nails song "Came Back Haunted". Reznor and Atticus Ross originally submitted a different track for the episode, but Lynch rejected it and requested they create "something that feels menacing and unpleasant". The original track later became "This Isn't The Place", featured on the Nine Inch Nails EP Add Violence.

Uniquely, the performance takes place during the episode, preceding the New Mexico scenes, rather than at its end. During the scene in which Monroe shoots Cooper's doppelgänger, a severely slowed-down recording of Ludwig van Beethoven's Moonlight Sonata plays. The atomic bomb sequence is underscored by Krzysztof Penderecki's Threnody to the Victims of Hiroshima (1961). Two original recordings are used in the episode, during the scenes in the structure over the purple sea: "Slow '30s Room", a remixed excerpt of the seventh movement in Lynch and Dean Hurley's 2007 album The Air Is on Fire, and "The Fireman" by Angelo Badalamenti; both were released on the 2017 album Twin Peaks: Limited Event Series Original Soundtrack. The Platters' "My Prayer" is used in the final scene. Coincidentally, one of the group's founding members is a singer named David Lynch.

== Reception ==
"Part 8" received critical acclaim. On Rotten Tomatoes, the episode received a 100% rating based on 29 reviews. The critical consensus reads, "'Part 8' adds yet another masterful chapter to Twin Peaks' return—and arguably one of the finest hours of creator David Lynch's incredible career." Writing for IndieWire, Liz Shannon Miller gave the episode a "B", expressing disappointment at the "disturbingly retro" special effects in the opening sequence and calling the Trinity Nuclear Test sequence "beautiful nonsense", while calling the scenes with Señorita Dido and the Fireman "captivating". She called the episode "truly polarizing" and "one that challenges viewers to appreciate its beauty, even if we don't understand it. Wherever you land on it, there's one thing that can't be argued: You've never seen this before on television."

The New York Times' Noel Murray gave the episode a positive review, drawing favorable comparisons to the end sequence of Stanley Kubrick's 2001: A Space Odyssey and Jonathan Glazer's Under the Skin, calling the episode "phenomenal". In his recap for Entertainment Weekly, Jeff Jensen called Part 8 "a mesmerizing rush of pure-cut WTF."

In her positive review of the episode, The A.V. Club's Emily L. Stephens gave the episode an "A", writing that she might not have been as impressed with it as a discrete experimental film but "both as a piece of Twin Peaks backstory and as an episode of television, 'The Return, Part 8' is as unexpected, as shocking, as thrilling as anything I've ever seen." In a roundtable discussion on the website, Ignatiy Vishnevetsky described the episode as "one of the most artistically daring episodes in the history of American television." Matt Zoller Seitz of Vulture declared "Part 8" as the best television episode of 2017, calling it "the single most impressive episode of television drama I've seen in... 20 years".

=== Accolades ===
The episode was nominated for several awards. Along with "Part 1" and "Part 15", the Art Directors Guild nominated it for the award for One-Hour Contemporary Single-Camera Series. The Cinema Audio Society nominated it for Outstanding Achievement in Sound Mixing for Television Movie or Mini-Series and the Motion Picture Sound Editors nominated it for a Golden Reel Award for Outstanding Achievement in Sound Editing.

For the 70th Primetime Creative Arts Emmy Awards, the episode was nominated in the Limited Series categories for Outstanding Cinematography, Outstanding Single-Camera Picture Editing, Outstanding Sound Editing, and Outstanding Sound Mixing.
