= Episode 9 (Twin Peaks) =

- Twin Peaks episode
- Killer Bob crawling towards Maddy. The scene has been praised as one of the most iconic of the series.
- Episode no.: Season 2 Episode 2
- Directed by: David Lynch
- Written by: Harley Peyton
- Production code: 2.002
- Original air date: October 6, 1990
- Running time: 47 minutes

Guest appearances
- Chris Mulkey as Hank Jennings; Miguel Ferrer as Special Agent Albert Rosenfield; David Patrick Kelly as Jerry Horne; Wendy Robie as Nadine Hurley; Don Davis as Major Garland Briggs; Victoria Catlin as Blackie O'Reilly; Don Amendolia as Emory Battis; Frances Bay as Mrs. Tremond; Grace Zabriskie as Sarah Palmer; Catherine E. Coulson as Margaret Lanterman / "The Log Lady"; Phoebe Augustine as Ronette Pulaski; Frank Silva as Killer BOB (uncredited)

Episode chronology
← Previous "Episode 8"	Next → "Episode 10"

"Episode 9", also known as "Coma", (Note: Although the series did not originally have episode titles, when it was broadcast in Germany, the episodes were given titles, which are now used by some fans and critics.) is the second episode of the second season of the American surrealist mystery horror drama television series Twin Peaks. The episode was written by Harley Peyton, and directed by series co-creator David Lynch. It features series regulars Kyle MacLachlan, Michael Ontkean, Ray Wise and Richard Beymer; and guest stars Chris Mulkey as Hank Jennings, Miguel Ferrer as Albert Rosenfield, David Patrick Kelly as Jerry Horne. Don S. Davis as Major Garland Briggs, Victoria Catlin as Blackie O'Reilly, Don Amendolia as Emory Battis, Frances Bay as Mrs. Tremond, Grace Zabriskie as Sarah Palmer, and Catherine E. Coulson as the Log Lady.

Twin Peaks centers on the investigation into the murder of schoolgirl Laura Palmer (Sheryl Lee), in the small rural town in Washington state after which the series is named. In this episode, Federal Bureau of Investigation (FBI) Special Agent Dale Cooper (MacLachlan) continues his investigation on Laura Palmer's murder together with Sheriff Truman (Ontkean), and FBI Special Agent Albert Rosenfield (Ferrer). In the meanwhile, Donna Hayward (Lara Flynn Boyle) and Audrey Horne (Sherilyn Fenn) continue their separate attempts at investigating, respectively by taking Laura's place in the Meals on Wheels, her community service, and by working undercover in the "One Eyed Jack's", a brothel where Laura has worked in the past.

"Episode 9" was broadcast on October 8, 1990, on the American Broadcasting Company (ABC) and was watched by an audience of 14.4 million households in the United States. Critical response to the episode was mainly positive.

== Plot ==
=== Background ===
The small town of Twin Peaks, Washington, has been shocked by the murder of schoolgirl Laura Palmer (Sheryl Lee) and the attempted murder of her friend Ronette Pulaski (Phoebe Augustine). FBI special agent Dale Cooper (Kyle MacLachlan) has been sent to the town to investigate. After being shot, Cooper has met the Giant (Carel Struycken), an enigmatic figure who gave him three clues; two of these will prove as true and fundamental to the investigation, clearing Leo Johnson (Eric Da Re) from Teresa Banks' murder and predicting that Jacques Renault (Walter Olkewicz) has been murdered. At the One Eyed Jacks, Audrey Horne (Sherilyn Fenn) manages to avoid a sexual experience with her father Ben Horne (Richard Beymer), which causes friction between her and the brothel's manager Blackie O'Reilly (Victoria Catlin). In Twin Peaks, after the burning of the Packard Sawmill arranged by Leo, Shelly Johnson (Mädchen Amick) is confirmed to have survived while Catherine Martell (Piper Laurie) remains missing.

=== Events ===
During their breakfast together at The Great Northern Hotel, Dale Cooper explains to a visibly uninterested Albert Rosenfield (Miguel Ferrer) Buddhist Tibetan history and traditions. Albert then proceeds to update Cooper over the progress made on their investigation during his absence, including that Jacques Renault was not strangled but smothered with a pillow, that the mill was definitely arson and that Leo Johnson is the most likely suspect and that Ronette Pulaski (Phoebe Augustine) woke up from her coma, but has not spoken yet. Albert then informs a visibly shocked Cooper that his former partner, Windom Earle, has escaped the psychiatric hospital in which he was institutionalized. An Asian man (Mak Takano) observes them intently for the whole time.

Donna Hayward (Lara Flynn Boyle) has taken over Laura's community service at the Meals on Wheels. She serves a tray of food to bed-ridden Mrs. Tremond (Frances Bay), who complains about the presence of creamed corn in her tray. The corn disappears from the tray, and it reappears in the hands of a little boy (Austin Jack Lynch) whom the woman refers to as her grandson "studying magic." When Donna asks her if she knew Laura Palmer, Mrs. Tremond denies it, but she suggests asking her neighbour, Mr. Smith; since he does not answer the door, Donna leaves a message.

Agent Cooper and Sheriff Truman (Michael Ontkean) are in Ronette Pulaski's hospital room, interrogating her; when shown a portrait of Leo Johnson, she shakes her head, while seeing a portrait of BOB causes her to convulse violently and knock over her I.V. Wondering whether to burn the real ledger or the fake one redacted by Josie, Ben Horne (Richard Beymer) and his brother Jerry end up not burning either, deciding to toast marshmallows instead. In the Double R Diner, Deputy Andy Brennan tries to tape a poster of BOB to the door. After Norma Jennings (Peggy Lipton) scolds her for spitting her chewing gum on the counter, the Log Lady (Catherine E. Coulson) tells Major Briggs (Don S. Davis) that her log tells him to "deliver the message", to which the Major replies that he understands.

At the Sheriff's office, Andy reports to Lucy (Kimmy Robertson) that he was diagnosed as sterile when applying for a donation to the Tacoma Sperm Bank, and asks how she can have a child. Sheriff Truman signs in Hank Jennings (Chris Mulkey) and tells him to stay clean; when Hank leaves, Truman tells Cooper that he used to be one of the best Bookhouse Boys. Ben Horne calls in and reports that his daughter Audrey has been missing for two days. Jerry explains to Ben that Catherine Martell did not sign her policy, fearing that Josie would be the beneficiary. As they decide to call the Icelandic investment group, Leland Palmer (Ray Wise) enters the room; when Einar, the investor, tells them that Leland already called him to tell him about the fire, Ben and Jerry calm him down. Annoyed, Ben tells Leland to concentrate on his tax returns; Leland, having spotted a poster of BOB, says that he knows him as the man who lived next to his grandfather's summer house when he was a child, and leaves to report it to the Sheriff.

At the hospital, Dr. Hayward (Warren Frost) shows to a shocked Shelly Johnson (Madchen Amick) her husband Leo (Eric Da Re), telling her that his brain may be damaged. At One Eyed Jack's, Audrey Horne (Sherilyn Fenn) takes the place of the girls serving Emory Battis (Don Amendolia), the manager of the Horne Department Store, and threatens him into giving her information. Emory admits that Audrey's father, Ben Horne, is the owner of the brothel, and that Emory recruited Laura Palmer and Ronette Pulaski for the brothel from their jobs at the perfume counter. He tells her that Laura was fired from the brothel for using drugs, but Ben knew that she was there and made it "his business to entertain all the girls.” Finally, Emory says that Laura knew that Ben was the owner of the place, and that she always got her way, just like Audrey.

In Major Briggs' car, Bobby Briggs (Dana Ashbrook) and Shelly talk about their relationship. Bobby tells her that they can get up to five thousand dollars a month of disability if Leo is at home. Major Briggs visits Cooper, who is recording a tape for Diane, in his room at the Great Northern Hotel. Briggs tells him that there is a message for him, and explains that part of his job is maintenance of deep space monitors aimed at distant galaxies. The message, written in clear English, is "the owls are not what they seem", and it arrived on the night in which Cooper was shot. When Cooper asks Briggs how he knew that the message was for him, Briggs shows him another message from the same night: the word "Cooper" repeated.

At the Haywards' house, Donna, James Hurley (James Marshall) and Maddy Ferguson (Sheryl Lee) are recording a song called "Just You." Noticing Maddy and James looking at each other, Donna rushes away from the room, unnerved; while James tries to console her, a call from Harold Smith arrives. In the living room, Maddy has a vision of BOB coming at her from the couch. When she screams, James and Donna reach her, and nothing is in the room. At the Great Northern, Cooper has a dream which includes part of his conversation with the Giant (Carel Struycken) and of Ronette's nightmare. He is awakened by the phone; when he answers, Audrey Horne asks him why he is not there and tells him that she is in trouble. Their conversation is interrupted by Emory Battis and Blackie O'Reilly. Blackie tells Audrey, “Miss Horne, you don’t know what trouble is, not by a long shot.”

== Production ==
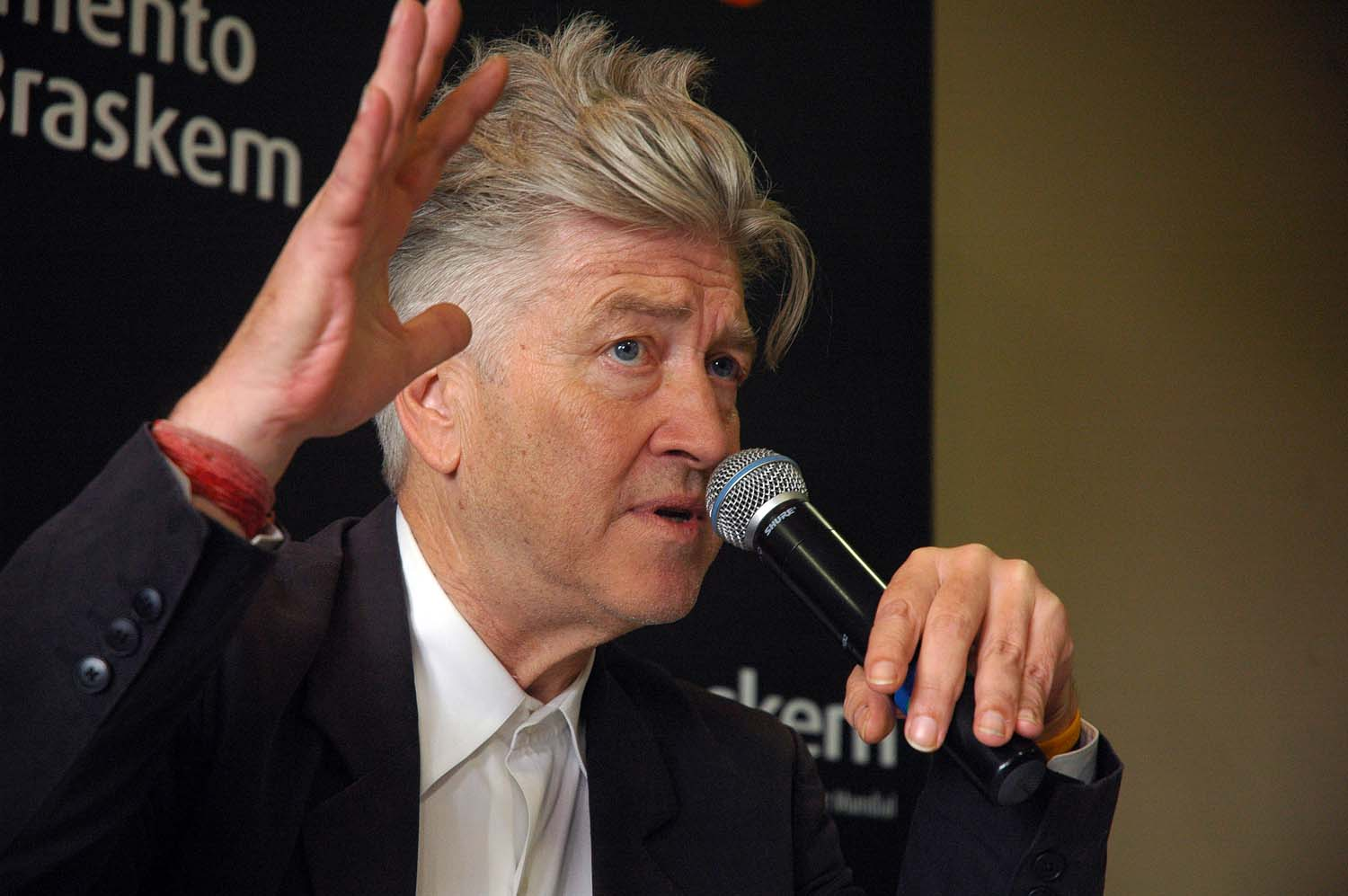
"Episode 9" was directed by David Lynch, one of the series co-creators.

"Episode 9" was written by Harley Peyton and directed by David Lynch. Lynch had directed three prior episodes—"Pilot", "Episode 2" and "Episode 8". Lynch would later direct "Episode 14", the original series finale "Episode 29" and all of the installments of the limited series, while Peyton wrote or co-wrote a total of ten more episodes of the original series.

== Broadcast ==
"Episode 9" was originally broadcast on the American Broadcasting Company (ABC) network on October 6, 1990. The initial broadcast was watched by 14.4 million households in the United States. It was considerable drop in ratings from the season premiere (19.1 million), a problem which will affect the rest of the season and which will lead the show to its eventual cancellation.

=== Reception ===
Critical response to the episode was positive. In his review for The A.V. Club, Keith Phipps noted that the episodes "sows a lot of seeds for future harvest", particularly citing the references to Windom Earle, Harold Smith and Garland Briggs' UFO work. Phipps praised the scene in which BOB appears to Maddy, calling it "one of those images that capture what the show does well" but criticised Audrey's plotline, giving the episode as a whole a B+ rating. AllRovi's Andrea LeVasseur has noted that "Episode 9" "contains the first of many significant references to owls throughout the series", rating it four out of five stars. DVD Talk's Jamie S. Rich gave a mixed response and commented that "side stories take a lot of the spotlight in the first half of the second season and suggest that Twin Peaks might have had a longer life as a regular cliffhanger serial had they abandoned the need for the series through-line." Nerdist's Eric Diaz rated the episode 3.5 burritos (Note: The site's grading scale.) out of 5 and called it "the least memorable of the six Lynch directed episodes", praising the episode as a whole but criticizing the scene in which James, Maddy and Donna sing together as "a black mark over an otherwise great episode."
