= Episode 14 (Twin Peaks) =

- Twin Peaks episode
- Leland Palmer inhabited by Killer BOB. The scene is the beginning of one which reveals the answer to the long-running plot arc for the series.
- Episode no.: Season 2 Episode 7
- Directed by: David Lynch
- Written by: Mark Frost
- Production code: 2.007
- Original air date: November 10, 1990
- Running time: 47 minutes

Guest appearances
- Grace Zabriskie as Sarah Palmer; Wendy Robie as Nadine Hurley; Al Strobel as Phillip Michael Gerard / MIKE; David Lynch as Bureau Chief Gordon Cole; Fumio Yamaguchi as Mr. Tojamura; Gary Hershberger as Mike Nelson; Catherine E. Coulson as Margaret Lanterman / "The Log Lady"; Carel Struycken as The Giant; Hank Worden as The Elderly Room Service Waiter; Frank Silva as Killer BOB (uncredited)

Episode chronology
← Previous "Episode 13"	Next → "Episode 15"

"Episode 14", also known as "Lonely Souls", (Note: Although the series did not originally have episode titles, when it was broadcast in Germany, the episodes were given titles, which are now used by some fans and critics.) is the seventh episode of the second season of the American television series Twin Peaks. The episode was written by series co-creator Mark Frost and directed by series co-creator David Lynch. It features series regulars Kyle MacLachlan, Michael Ontkean, Ray Wise and Richard Beymer; and guest stars Frank Silva (uncredited) as Killer BOB, Hank Worden as The Waiter, Julee Cruise as Singer, and David Lynch as Gordon Cole.

Twin Peaks centers on the investigation into the murder of schoolgirl Laura Palmer (Sheryl Lee) in the small rural town in Washington state after which the series is named. In this episode, during the ongoing investigation into Laura's death, FBI special agent Dale Cooper (MacLachlan) and Sheriff Truman (Ontkean) continue to search for her killer, the demonic BOB, who has possessed a human host. Aided by Mike (Al Strobel), Cooper and Truman arrest Benjamin Horne (Beymer), believing him to be inhabited by BOB. Later that night, The Giant (Carel Struycken) warns Cooper "it is happening again," while BOB's real host, Leland Palmer (Wise), murders Madeline Ferguson (Lee).

"Episode 14" was first broadcast on November 10, 1990, on the American Broadcasting Company (ABC) and was watched by an audience of 17.2 million households in the United States, about 20 percent of the available audience. The episode was well received, garnering positive reviews after its initial broadcast and in subsequent years. Academic readings of the entry have highlighted the theme of duality and the cinematography in the revelation scene.

== Plot ==
=== Background ===
The small fictional town of Twin Peaks, Washington, has been shocked by the murder of schoolgirl Laura Palmer (Sheryl Lee) and the attempted murder of her friend Ronette Pulaski (Phoebe Augustine). FBI special agent Dale Cooper (Kyle MacLachlan) has been sent to the town to investigate, and has come to the realization that the killer was possessed by a demonic entity—Killer BOB (Frank Silva). MIKE (Al Strobel), a similar spirit, has spoken to Cooper and his FBI superior, Regional Bureau Chief Gordon Cole (David Lynch), explaining the nature of their existence.

Meanwhile, Madeline "Maddy" Ferguson (Lee), Laura's cousin, has arrived in Twin Peaks from Missoula, Montana, and helps Laura's friends Donna Hayward (Lara Flynn Boyle) and James Hurley (James Marshall) investigate the killing. Donna finds Harold Smith (Lenny Von Dohlen), one of Laura's friends to whom she had given a secret diary, and Donna and Maddy attempt to steal it from him.

=== Events ===
Cooper, Sheriff Harry S. Truman (Michael Ontkean), Deputy Andy Brennan (Harry Goaz), Doctor Hayward (Warren Frost) and Mike visit The Great Northern hotel in an attempt to find Bob's human host. Upon the approach of Benjamin Horne, Mike convulses and collapses onto the floor, indicating that Bob has inhabited someone nearby. Meanwhile, Deputy Hawk (Michael Horse) visits the residence of Harold Smith and finds that he has committed suicide. Hawk contacts Cooper and Truman, and they arrive at Smith's residence and discover Laura Palmer's secret diary among his belongings. Meanwhile, Maddy announces she is leaving Twin Peaks to return home.

Elsewhere, Bobby Briggs (Dana Ashbrook) and Shelly Johnson (Mädchen Amick) discuss their financial concerns regarding Shelly's catatonic husband Leo (Eric Da Re). Audrey Horne (Sherilyn Fenn) confronts her father Ben (Richard Beymer) over his ownership of One Eyed Jacks, a casino and brothel on the Canada–United States border. When Audrey asks him whether he killed Laura Palmer, he denies it but confesses that he and Laura had a sexual relationship and that he loved her. Later, Shelly arrives for work at the Double R Diner and announces to its owner Norma Jennings (Peggy Lipton) that she is resigning to care for Leo full-time. Ed Hurley (Everett McGill) and his wife Nadine, who is experiencing amnesia and adrenaline-induced strength, enter the diner. Nadine, believing she is eighteen years old, speaks to Norma, but the waitress, along with Ed, puts on a façade and conceals the truth. Meanwhile, Bobby and his friend Mike Nelson (Gary Hershberger) break open the sole of Leo Johnson's shoe, discovering a microcassette.

Cooper examines the remains of Laura's diary at the police station, finding repeated references to Bob's long-running molestation of her. Cooper also learns that Bob is a friend of Laura's father, Leland Palmer (Ray Wise), and finds an entry that seemingly implicates Ben Horne. Audrey then enters and tells Cooper about Ben and Laura's affair. After she leaves, Cooper tells Sheriff Truman about The Giant's message "without chemicals, he points". Cooper recalls when Mike—who becomes active when his human host, Philip Gerard, is not on drugs—spasmed in The Great Northern's lobby when Ben entered. Cooper concludes that Ben is Bob's human host and arrests him.

Later that night, Sarah Palmer (Grace Zabriskie) crawls across her living room floor and has a vision of a white horse. Cooper and Truman visit The Roadhouse at the behest of the Log Lady (Catherine E. Coulson). While a band perform, Cooper has a vision of The Giant, who tells him "it is happening again". The Giant sees Leland Palmer fixing his tie, while his reflection in the mirror shows Bob. Maddy comes downstairs and sees Bob standing over Sarah's unconscious body. Bob's visage shifts back and forth between Leland's and his own. He chases Maddy up the stairs, brings her to the living room and repeatedly strangles, punches, taunts and kisses her before ramming her head into a glass picture frame, eventually killing her. Bob places a letter "O" under her fingernails, as he had done with other letters on past victims. Cooper's vision ends, and The Waiter (Hank Worden) tells Cooper he is sorry. Donna and James cry during the band's final song.

== Production ==
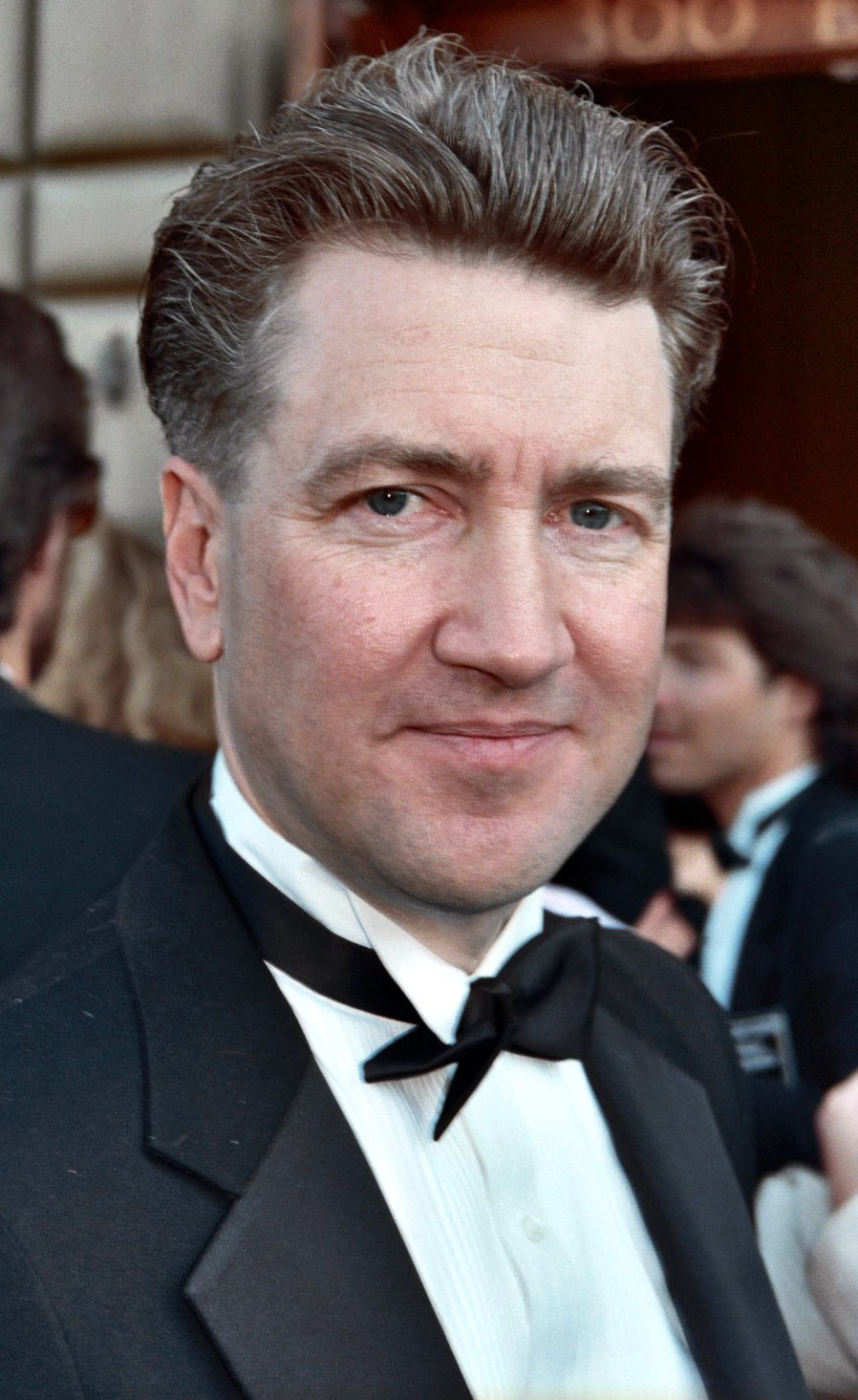
"Episode 14" was directed by David Lynch, who co-created Twin Peaks.

"Episode 14" was written by series co-creator Mark Frost, who had written six previous episodes and directed the first-season finale, "Episode 7". Frost co-wrote three further installments—"Episode 16", "Episode 26" and Episode 29"—and all the episodes of the 2017 limited series. This episode was directed by Lynch, the fifth such episode of Twin Peaks; he later directed "Episode 29" and all the installments of the limited series. Lynch has later said he feels he was able to show more on screen in the episode than he expected the network's standards and practices office to allow. He credits this to the unusual imagery used, adding "if it's not quite standard it sneaks through, but it could be that the 'not quite standard' things make it even more terrifying and disturbing."

The cast of Twin Peaks did not know who would be revealed as Palmer's killer for some time. Wise had hoped his character Leland would not be the eventual murderer; as the parent of a young girl he was disturbed by the idea of portraying a man who had murdered his daughter. Wise was called to a meeting with Lynch, Frost, Sheryl Lee and Richard Beymer, during which Lynch told those assembled that Leland Palmer was the killer: while addressing Wise, Lynch said "Ray, it was you, it was always you." However, Wise felt the end result was "beautiful" and that it left him and his character "satisfied and redeemed". Before this meeting, the only people to know the killer's identity were Frost, Lynch, and Lynch's daughter Jennifer, who had been given the information so she could author the 1990 tie-in novel The Secret Diary of Laura Palmer.

Lynch has mentioned that he tried to avoid thinking about the morality of the narrative, or how it would be received by censors or critics, feeling that if he allowed that worry to affect him it would ultimately drive him to create something that made him uncomfortable, preferring instead to simply produce the episode he wanted to and be prepared to defend it if necessary. He has also compared the search for Laura's killer to the central narrative of the 1960s television series The Fugitive, which featured an ongoing search for a one-armed man. Contrasting the two, Lynch stated "each week, you know, they [the writers for The Fugitive] hardly ever dealt with that. And that's the beautiful thing. You keep wondering, 'When will he find this guy and set everything straight?' But then you knew it would be the end."

=== Cinematography ===
The climactic murder of Madeline Ferguson in the episode features extensive use of jump cuts to portray Leland Palmer's spirit possession, switching rapidly between actors Ray Wise and Frank Silva. The scene is unusually long for a murder on television, lasting over four minutes. Some of its elements, including the insertion of a paper letter under Ferguson's fingernail and the use of jump cuts to events in the Roadhouse bar, are intended to echo similar aspects of "Pilot".

Erica Sheen and Annette Davison, in their book The Cinema of David Lynch: American Dreams, Nightmare Visions, have drawn attention to the use of mise en scène early in the episode. A scene featuring Ferguson, Leland and Sarah Palmer sitting in the Palmers' living room pans across the family's bric-a-brac. This technique draws attention to the painting with which Ferguson will be assaulted, and it highlights the similarity between Ferguson and Palmer by focusing on "the famous homecoming queen shot" of Palmer while Ferguson's face is visible. Sheen and Davison argued that the scene highlights the "emotional claustrophobia" felt by Ferguson, and that the set surrounding her was deliberately assembled to create this feeling.

== Themes ==
The revelation scene, in which Bob is shown to have inhabited Leland Palmer, has been noted for its sense of duality, a common theme throughout Twin Peaks. In Full of Secrets: Critical Approaches to Twin Peaks, David Lavery wrote that upon The Giant's appearance to Dale Cooper, "The Giant has transmuted the public place into something private". Lavery added that the murder scene is "in the living room, the public within the private". He summarized that the ambiguity between the public perception and the private perception—"the outer and the inner"—"reverberates" throughout the scene. In his view, Maddy Ferguson was Laura Palmer's "double" and Leland is "doubled" by Bob. However, Lavery referred to the duality of Leland and Bob as a "subjective formation" and added that the use of jump cuts "could be Maddy's view of Leland just as much as Leland's view of himself".

This scene has also been noted by critic Sue Lafky from the Journal of Film and Video as one of several in the series that suggest incest and necrophilia. She speculated that "Leland/Bob may have raped the dead or dying Maddie", comparing this to the "necrophilic fantasies" that Laura Palmer's corpse evokes, and Ben Horne's unwitting brush with incest when he encounters his daughter Audrey at a brothel.

== Broadcast and reception ==
It's a promise of sorts that we've still got a reason to be with the show, and it sets us up for the middle portion of this cycle. This good will is carried through episodes 15 and 16, as the killer is finally unmasked, and as the Log Lady tells us in her intro, shifts the queries from who to why.

— DVD Talk's Jamie S. Rich on the episode's place in the series

"Episode 14" first aired on the ABC network on November 10, 1990. The initial broadcast was viewed by 17.2 million households in the United States, making it the fifty-first most-viewed broadcast episode for the week. These viewing figures represented 20 percent of the available audience and 10.4 percent of all households in the country. This represented a significant rise in viewing figures compared to the preceding episode, "Episode 13", which was seen by 11.3 million households. However, the following episode, "Episode 15", suffered a drop in viewing figures, attracting 13.3 million households.

The episode was well received critically. Writing for the Chicago Sun-Times, Richard Roeper noted that fans and critics had begun to lose interest in the series by this point, but he felt that "even at its most strained and obtuse, [Twin Peaks] displays more imagination and effort than almost everything else in TV land." He added that viewers may have been put off by the series' frame of time, explaining that only two weeks of narrative time had elapsed since "Pilot", a slow pace contrasted with the "fast-forward, instant payoff philosophy of most television". AllRovi's Andrea LeVasseur described the installment as "pivotal", noting that it "answers some of the series' long-running questions".

Writing for The A.V. Club, Keith Phipps rated the episode an "A", adding "it's not like there's any shortage of action." He felt the effects used in the episode were effective and frightening while still seeming low-key. In his view, the episode's blending of surrealism and horror was similar to scenes from Lynch's 2001 film Mulholland Drive. Phipps described the climactic murder as "one of the most disturbing moments in the Lynch filmography", adding that it was a recurring Lynchian theme to represent the end of innocence as an actual death. IGN's Matt Fowler included the murder at number 16 in a list of the "Top 20 Creepiest Moments on TV", describing it as "nightmare fuel". Fowler felt the depiction of the killing was "savage" and unusually long for a television scene; however, he added that the rampant speculation as to the identity of the killer meant the revelation would be "somewhat expected".

Keith Uhlich, writing for Slant Magazine, described the episode as "quintessential Lynch, perhaps his finest work", noting that the climactic murder scene was more powerful because of its necessary use of implication and suggestion. However, Uhlich felt the installment was "a tough act to follow", arguing that the only subsequent installments that competed with it were the series' finale and the 1992 psychological thriller film Twin Peaks: Fire Walk with Me, which is based on Twin Peaks. DVD Talk's Jamie S. Rich described the installment as "a violent, disturbing revelation". Rich felt the entry's supernatural elements assured the audience there was "a grander scheme to the Laura Palmer story", elevating the series' long-running murder plot beyond "just a random night partying with drug dealers gone wrong".

== Sources ==
- Lynch, Jennifer (2010). Interview with Jennifer Lynch (DVD). Los Angeles: Universal Home Entertainment.
- Odell, Colin; Le Blanc, Michelle (2007). David Lynch. Harpenden: Kamera Books. ISBN 978-1-84243-225-9.
- Riches, Simon (2011). "Intuition and Investigation into Another Place: The Epistemological Role of Dreaming in Twin Peaks and Beyond". In Devlin, William J.; Biderman, Shai (eds.). The Philosophy of David Lynch. Lexington: University Press of Kentucky. ISBN 978-0-8131-3396-6.
- Rodley, Chris; Lynch, David (2005). Lynch on Lynch (2nd ed.). London: Macmillan. ISBN 0-571-22018-5.
- Sheen, Erica; Davison, Annette (2004). The Cinema of David Lynch: American Dreams, Nightmare Visions. United States: Wallflower Press. ISBN 1-903364-85-X.
- Lavery, David (1995). Full of Secrets: Critical Approaches to Twin Peaks. Detroit: Wayne State University Press. ISBN 0-8143-2506-8.
