= Episode 16 (Twin Peaks) =

- Twin Peaks episode
- Leland Palmer is comforted by Special Agent Dale Cooper as he dies.
- Episode no.: Season 2 Episode 9
- Directed by: Tim Hunter
- Written by: Mark Frost; Harley Peyton; Robert Engels
- Production code: 2.009
- Original air date: December 1, 1990
- Running time: 47 minutes

Guest appearances
- Miguel Ferrer as Special Agent Albert Rosenfield; Ian Buchanan as Dick Tremayne; Jane Greer as Vivian Smythe Niles; Don Davis as Major Garland Briggs; Al Strobel as Phillip Michael Gerard / MIKE; Michael J. Anderson as The Man from Another Place; Frank Silva as Killer BOB; Carel Struycken as The Giant; Hank Worden as The Elderly Room Service Waiter

Episode chronology
← Previous "Episode 15"	Next → "Episode 17"

"Episode 16", also known as "Arbitrary Law", (Note: Although the series did not originally have episode titles, when it was broadcast in Germany, the episodes were given titles, which are now used by some fans and critics.) is the ninth episode of the second season of the American surrealist mystery horror drama television series Twin Peaks. The episode was written by series co-creator Mark Frost, producer Harley Peyton and regular writer Robert Engels, and directed by Tim Hunter. It features series regulars Kyle MacLachlan, Michael Ontkean, Ray Wise and Richard Beymer, and guest stars Miguel Ferrer as Albert Rosenfield, Don S. Davis as Major Briggs, and Al Strobel as Mike.

Twin Peaks centers on the investigation into the murder of schoolgirl Laura Palmer (Sheryl Lee), in the small rural town in Washington state after which the series is named. In this episode, following the discovery of Madeleine "Maddy" Ferguson (Lee), Federal Bureau of Investigation (FBI) Special Agents Dale Cooper (MacLachlan) and Albert Rosenfield, and Sheriff Truman (Ontkean) continue to search for the human host of the killer—the demon BOB (Frank Silva). With assistance from MIKE (Al Strobel), Donna Hayward (Lara Flynn Boyle) and The Waiter (Hank Worden), the three men discover that Leland Palmer (Wise) is BOB's host and form a plan to capture BOB.

"Episode 16" was first broadcast on December 1, 1990, on ABC, and was watched by an audience of 12.4 million households in the United States (about 15 percent of the available audience). Critical response to the episode was positive, with many deeming it an emotionally powerful resolution to the show’s central mystery, although some criticized it for feeling rushed.

== Plot ==
=== Background ===
The small town of Twin Peaks, Washington, has been shocked by the murder of schoolgirl Laura Palmer (Sheryl Lee) and the attempted murder of her friend Ronette Pulaski (Phoebe Augustine). Federal Bureau of Investigation (FBI) Special Agent Dale Cooper (Kyle MacLachlan) has been sent to the town to investigate, and has come to the realization that the killer was possessed by a demonic entity—Killer BOB (Frank Silva). BOB's real human host, Laura's father Leland Palmer (Ray Wise), has murdered his niece Madeleine "Maddy" Ferguson (Lee) and disposed of her body.

Meanwhile, Ben Horne (Richard Beymer) is still imprisoned under suspicion of Laura Palmer's murder, Lucy Moran (Kimmy Robertson) confronts Deputy Andy Brennan (Harry Goaz) and Dick Tremayne (Ian Buchanan) about her pregnancy, and Norma Jennings (Peggy Lipton) is surprised when her mother, Vivian Smythe Niles (Jane Greer) arrives in Twin Peaks with her new husband, Ernie (James Booth).

=== Events ===
Cooper, FBI Special Agent Albert Rosenfield (Miguel Ferrer), Sheriff Harry S. Truman (Michael Ontkean) and Deputy Hawk walk through the woods outside of Twin Peaks the morning after the discovery of Maddy Ferguson's body. Albert gives forensic evidence to Cooper, concluding Maddy's killer was the same person who murdered her cousin, Laura Palmer. Sheriff Truman insists on contacting Maddy's uncle Leland Palmer, as he would be able to contact her parents. Cooper persuades Sheriff Truman to give him twenty four hours "to finish this."

In the Double R Diner, Deputy Andy Brennan sits at the counter reciting the French phrase "J'ai une âme solitaire" ("I am a lonely soul"). Donna Hayward (Lara Flynn Boyle) approaches Andy and asks if he had visited Mrs. Tremond (Frances Bay), whose grandson had said the same phrase to her during her Meals on Wheels round. Andy reveals that the phrase was included in Harold Smith (Lenny Von Dohlen)'s suicide note. Donna contacts Cooper and both of them visit Mrs. Tremond's home, only to find a completely different woman living there answering to the name of Mrs. Tremond. She gives Donna an envelope from Harold Smith, containing two pages from Laura Palmer's secret diary. The entries, dated February 22 and 23, reveal that Cooper and Laura had the same dream involving the Red Room and that Laura was aware of her imminent death.

Cooper visits MIKE (Al Strobel), who is inhabiting Philip Gerard, at the Great Northern Hotel. Cooper tells MIKE that he and Laura had the same dream on separate occasions and he needs to unlock the answers. MIKE mentions a "golden circle" and his connection with The Giant (Carel Struycken), telling Cooper that he must summon The Giant to receive answers. Upon leaving MIKE's room, Cooper encounters the Waiter (Hank Worden), who tells him that he's "getting warmer now."

Elsewhere, James Hurley (James Marshall) gives Donna a ring, Norma Jennings (Peggy Lipton) has an altercation with her mother, Vivian Smythe Niles (Jane Greer), in the Double R Diner, and Lucy Moran tells Andy Brennan and Richard Tremayne about her plans for a blood test to determine which of them is the father of her baby. Mr. Tojamura visits Ben Horne (Richard Beymer) in jail, and reveals himself to be Catherine Martell (Piper Laurie) in disguise. Ben signs the Ghostwood Project contract over to Catherine in exchange for an alibi in the murder case.

Meanwhile, Donna visits Leland Palmer to deliver a tape of a song she, James and Maddy recorded together. Leland, while inhabited by BOB, asks Donna to dance with him and becomes aggressive, before being distracted by a knock on the door from Sheriff Truman. He informs Leland there has been another murder and asks him to come to the Roadhouse.

At the Roadhouse, Cooper assembles all of the people he suspects might be BOB's host. While there, the Waiter offers people sticks of gum and tells Leland "that gum you like is going to come back in style", prompting Cooper to remember his earlier dream of the Red Room. Cooper then finally recalls the words the Laura of his dream whispered into his ear, "My father killed me."

Now knowing Leland is BOB's host, Cooper with Truman and the other deputies stage a scene at sheriff's station to arrest Ben Horne. Cooper requests Leland accompany them to function as Ben's attorney. While Ben is escorted through the station, Cooper and Truman shove Leland into the interrogation room and lock him in. Trapped, Leland goes into a manic fit, to the shock of those watching.

Inside the interrogation room, BOB confesses through Leland's body to Cooper and the others that he murdered Theresa Banks, Laura Palmer and Maddy Ferguson. When Cooper, Albert, Sheriff Truman and Hawk leave, BOB chants a poem ending with the phrase "fire, walk with me." The water sprinklers turn on, triggered by smoke from Dick Tremayne's cigarette, and BOB forces Leland to commit suicide by ramming his head into the door. BOB vacates Leland's body, and Leland becomes aware of what BOB did while in his body and reveals the nature of his possession as he dies. Cooper comforts Leland through his last moments by reciting a paraphrase of a passage from the Bardo Thodol, and Leland dies after seeing a vision of Laura.

Cooper, Rosenfield, Sheriff Truman, and Major Garland Briggs (Don S. Davis) walk through the woods discussing Leland's possession and death. Rosenfield concludes that BOB is simply "the evil that men do", and Sheriff Truman questions where BOB might have gone after leaving Leland's body. Cooper seems unsure how to respond.

The viewer then sees the point-of-view of an unseen character, implied to be BOB, as it flees through the woods towards a white light, from which an owl emerges.

== Production ==
"Episode 16" was written by Twin Peaks co-creator Mark Frost, producer Harley Peyton and regular series writer Robert Engels. Frost co-wrote two further episodes of the series, "Episode 26" and "Episode 29." Engels co-wrote a further four installments — "Episode 22", "Episode 25", "Episode 27", and "Episode 29" — and Peyton co-wrote seven later scripts.

Although credited, Mädchen Amick, Sherilyn Fenn, Jack Nance, and Joan Chen do not appear in this episode. Ray Wise leaves the regular cast after this episode.

== Themes ==
Leland Palmer's final moments in "Episode 16" feature spiritual themes. In The Philosophy of David Lynch, Simon Riches draws comparison between Cooper guiding Leland to "find the light" as he dies and his use of the "Tibetan method" of divination in "Episode 2". Using an extract from Desire Under the Douglas Firs: Entering the Body of Reality in Twin Peaks, a critical essay by Martha Nochimson, Riches argues that Cooper acts as Leland's "spiritual guide", which is "a narrative realization of Cooper's Tibetan Method."

== Reception and legacy ==
"Episode 16" was originally broadcast on the American Broadcasting Company (ABC) network on December 1, 1990. The initial broadcast was watched by 12.4 million households in the United States—which represented 15 percent of the available audience and 7.9 percent of all households in the country. The ratings denoted a further decline since the revelation of Laura Palmer's killer in "Episode 14", which attracted 17.2 million viewers. The preceding episode, "Episode 15" was seen by 13.3 million households and the following episode, "Episode 17", suffered a further decline, attracting 11.1 million households.

Critical reception to "Episode 16" has been positive. Writing for The A.V. Club, Keith Phipps said that the installment "feels rushed" but suggested that "there's still a lot [...] that works." He further added: "'that gum you like is going to come back in style,' remains an endlessly quotable line and Palmer's death scene is well handled with, again, some superb Ray Wise acting. And while I fully accept that Twin Peaks wants us to buy into its woodsy-mystico mythology of good and evil, I like that Wise plays it as if it might be all in his head to the end" but stated that the final scene was "clumsy." AllRovi's Andrea LeVasseur referred to the episode's ending as "a final chaotic conclusion."

Series co-creator Mark Frost cited Leland's death scene as one of his two favourites across all three series when interviewed in 2025.

== Sources ==
- Riches, Simon (2011). Devlin, William J.; Biderman, Shai (eds.). The Philosophy of David Lynch. Lexington: University Press of Kentucky. ISBN 978-0-8131-3396-6.
