= Angel's Dance =

1999 American-German film by David L. Corley

- DVD cover
- Directed by: David L. Corley
- Written by: David L. Corley
- Produced by: David Bixler
- Starring: James Belushi; Sheryl Lee; Kyle Chandler
- Cinematography: Michael G. Wojciechowski
- Edited by: Sean Albertson
- Music by: Tim Truman
- Distributed by: Promark Entertainment Group
- Release date: 1999
- Running time: 102 minutes
- Country: United States / Germany
- Language: English

Angel's Dance is a 1999 American-German black comedy crime film written and directed by David L. Corley and produced by David Bixler. The film stars James Belushi, Sheryl Lee and Kyle Chandler.

== Premise ==
Tony wants to be a hitman for the Mafia, but first he has to learn from a master. Enter Stevie "The Rose" Rosellini - cool, eats veggie dogs and quotes Nietzsche. Greco may not agree with Stevie's style, but he has to complete his training so he can go back and kill the Mafia's accountant, who is about to turn state's evidence. His final test: kill whoever is supposedly randomly picked out of the yellow pages. His target: Angelica "Angel" Chaste, a very disturbed woman. Tony falls for Angel and fails to kill her, so Stevie sets out to finish the job.

== Cast ==
- James Belushi as Stevie "The Rose" Rosellini
- Sheryl Lee as Angelica "Angel" Chaste
- Kyle Chandler as Tony Greco
- Frank John Hughes as Nick
- Ned Bellamy as Police Detective
- Mark Carlton as Bob
- Mac Davis as Norman
- Jon Polito as Vinnie "Uncle Vinnie"
- David Bickford as Accountant
- Timo Flloko as "The Shank"

== Critical reception ==
Variety wrote that Angel's Dance was, "A diverting, if just half-successful, attempt to put a fresh spin on the now-familiar mix of hit men and black comedy, "Angel's Dance" shifts the central p.o.v. to a female character --- then doesn't develop her well enough to make that refreshing switch pay off as well as it should."
