= Donna Hayward =

Fictional character

- Twin Peaks character
- Top: Lara Flynn Boyle as Donna Hayward in Twin Peaks; Bottom: Moira Kelly as Donna Hayward in Twin Peaks: Fire Walk with Me
- First appearance: "Pilot" (1990)
- Last appearance: Twin Peaks: Fire Walk with Me (1992)
- Created by: David Lynch; Mark Frost
- Portrayed by: Television: Lara Flynn Boyle; Film: Moira Kelly
- Duration: 1990–1991, 1992, 2014

In-universe information
- Full name: Donna Marie Hayward
- Occupation: High school student (former); Model
- Family: Hayward / Horne
- Relatives: Will Hayward (adoptive father) Eileen Hayward (mother) Ben Horne (biological father) (on Eileen's side) Harriet Hayward (half-sister) Gersten Hayward (half-sister) (on Ben's side) Audrey Horne (half-sister) Johnny Horne (half-brother) Jerry Horne (uncle) Richard Horne (half-nephew)
- Birth date: September 2, 1972

Donna Marie Hayward is a fictional character in the Twin Peaks franchise. She was portrayed by Lara Flynn Boyle in the television series Twin Peaks (1990–1991) and by Moira Kelly in the film Twin Peaks: Fire Walk with Me (1992) and its deleted and extended scenes compilation Twin Peaks: The Missing Pieces (2014). She was created by David Lynch and Mark Frost. Making her debut as a main character in the original series, Donna is introduced as the best friend and classmate of Laura Palmer (Sheryl Lee), who tries to solve the mystery of her murder. Donna has a supporting role in the prequel film Twin Peaks: Fire Walk With Me, which depicts the final week of Laura's life. Donna is referenced numerous times in Jennifer Lynch's novel The Secret Diary of Laura Palmer. The novel Twin Peaks: The Final Dossier by Mark Frost reveals some of what happened to her after the events of the show's second season.

== Appearances ==
=== In television ===
Donna is first seen walking to her locker at school, amused at the sight of Audrey Horne (Sherilyn Fenn) changing into heels and smoking a cigarette a few lockers down. She then goes to class and sees a deputy enter the classroom as the teacher is taking attendance, asking if Bobby Briggs (Dana Ashbrook) is present. After the town hears the news of her best friend Laura Palmer's murder, Donna looks at Laura's empty desk and begins to cry. Sheriff Harry S. Truman (Michael Ontkean) and FBI Special Agent Dale Cooper (Kyle MacLachlan) question her about a picnic she had with Laura that was filmed by James Hurley (James Marshall), but she insists that it was recorded by a female hiker.

Donna sneaks out and goes to the Roadhouse, where a fight breaks out between James and Donna's boyfriend Mike (Gary Hershberger). Donna and James escape to the woods, where she tells him that the police are looking for him. When they drive off, they are stopped by Truman and Cooper. The next morning, Donna tells her mother Eileen (Mary Jo Deschanel) she has feelings for James. She goes to the Palmer home, and talks to Laura's mother Sarah (Grace Zabriskie), who calls Donna by Laura's name and becomes hysterical. The next day, Donna goes to the Double R Diner and talks to Audrey about Laura's death and their shared admiration for Cooper.

The following day, Donna attends Laura's funeral, and witnesses Laura's father Leland (Ray Wise) throw himself on Laura's casket while sobbing hysterically. At school, Donna is doing her makeup when Audrey comes in and tells her that she is aware of the secrets surrounding Laura's life, including that she had been sleeping with Dr. Lawrence Jacoby (Russ Tamblyn), something that Donna didn't know.

Later, she goes to the woods with James to find the other half of the necklace that they buried as children, but they cannot find it. Donna later goes to the Double R Diner with him, where she meets Laura's cousin, Maddy Ferguson (Lee). She asks Maddy to assist them in their investigation into Laura's death. Later that night, Maddy calls Donna and tells her that she found a tape in Laura's hiding place. Donna listens to the tape and realized that it was recorded for Jacoby. She discovers that a tape recorded the night Laura died is missing. James believes that Jacoby must be in possession of the tape and suggests they go to Jacoby's office to find it, and that they could lure him out with a "phone call from Laura".

Later, Donna meets Maddy and James in the park, the former wearing a blonde wig to make her look identical to Laura. Maddy deceives Jacoby by speaking as Laura on the phone. Donna and James infiltrate his office as he left. Donna finds the missing tape and half of Laura's necklace. At Donna's house, they listen to the tape, in which Laura mentions a "mystery man" who drives a red Corvette.

Donna goes to the Double R Diner the next day and meets with Maddy. Maddy then informs her that Leland's hair has turned white. Donna calls Norma Jennings (Peggy Lipton) and expresses interest in taking over Laura's volunteer route for Meals on Wheels. Starting on the route, Donna goes to the home of an elderly woman named Mrs. Tremond (Frances Bay), who tells her about her agoraphobic neighbor, Harold Smith (Lenny Von Dohlen), and reveals that he and Laura were friends. Donna knocks on Smith's door, but he does not answer, so she leaves him a note. He calls her that night, and they arrange to meet the next day. The next morning, she goes to Harold's home and they talk about Laura before he goes to his greenhouse to get a flower for Laura's grave. She confides in Harold and starts to develop feelings for him.

While looking at Harold's flowers, Donna discovers Laura's secret diary. While having lunch with Harold, Donna offers to tell him her life story if she can read Laura's diary; he agrees, but says that he will read it to her and that it cannot leave the room. She snatches the diary and walks outside of Harold's house. He tries to follow her, but after stepping outside, he has a panic attack and collapses. Feeling guilty, Donna apologizes and returns the diary.

Still seeking answers to Laura's murder, Donna and Maddy set up a plan to steal the diary. Donna meets with Harold and tells him of a day years earlier in which she and Laura went skinny-dipping with a group of older boys. She says that she fell in love for the first time that day with one of these boys, Tim. She and Harold then share a kiss.

Donna tells the authorities that Harold has Laura's diary, but her claims are met with skepticism, as they already discovered a diary at the Palmer house. Harold later commits suicide, and Donna feels responsible. At the diner, Donna hear Sheriff’s Deputy Andy Brennan (Harry Goaz) saying, "J'ai une âme solitaire," and she questions him about Mrs. Tremond, but he says that this line was actually in Harold’s suicide note and that it means, "I am a lonely soul."

Donna goes to Cooper and tells him about Mrs. Tremond. They go to her house, but a different Mrs. Tremond answers the door. She gives Donna an envelope from Harold, containing a page from Laura's diary, where she described a dream of being in a red room, the mysterious "BOB" (Frank Silva), and her premonition of her own death the following night. Donna goes to the Palmer house to deliver a tape for Maddy, and becomes fearful upon learning that Maddy didn't make it home. She learns later that Maddy was murdered by Leland, who also murdered Laura; he committed both murders while being possessed by BOB, who turns out to be a demonic entity who had been sexually abusing Laura while using Leland as a host.

Donna soon discovers a connection between her mother and hotel magnate Ben Horne (Richard Beymer). Intrigued, Donna follows Eileen to the Great Northern Hotel, discovering that she planned to meet Horne. Audrey, Horne's daughter, assists her with her investigation. Upon discovering flowers sent to her mother, Donna finds her birth certificate and discovers that it does not list a father; she then realizes that Ben Horne is her biological father.

=== In film ===
Donna Hayward, now played by Moira Kelly, has a supporting role in the prequel films Twin Peaks: Fire Walk with Me and Twin Peaks: The Missing Pieces. In Fire Walk With Me, Donna is first seen walking to school with Laura. After school, they go to Donna's home, where they talk about Laura's boyfriend Bobby Briggs and James Hurley, the latter Donna describes as "the one." The next day, a distraught Laura shows up at Donna's house and asks if she is her best friend.

The next night, Donna goes to Laura's house, where Laura is preparing to go out and refuses to tell Donna where she is going. Donna follows Laura to the Roadhouse, and finds out that her best friend is working as a prostitute. Intrigued, Donna enters the Roadhouse, gets drunk, and kisses one of Laura's customers. Despite Laura's initial reluctance, Donna goes with her and two men up to a brothel in Canada, where an orgy is taking place. There, Donna refuses an offer of cocaine, but nevertheless joins the party, and eventually takes her shirt off and begins making out with several strange men. Laura pulls one such man off of Donna, covers her up and takes her home. The next day, Laura begs Donna not to become like her.

=== In literature ===
Donna is referenced numerous times in Jennifer Lynch's novel The Secret Diary of Laura Palmer. In Mark Frost's novel Twin Peaks: The Final Dossier, it is revealed that upon graduating high school, Donna leaves Twin Peaks to pursue an education at Hunter College in New York City. Soon after, she finds an unexpected career as a fashion model, a job that brings her international recognition. Donna becomes a prominent name in the tabloids, which run sensationalized stories about her love life that eventually overshadow her career. She marries a man twice her age and soon becomes addicted to drugs and alcohol as a means to cope with the decline of her career. After her husband files for divorce, Donna seeks help through substance rehabilitation. After overcoming her addictions, Donna reconnects with her father and comes to live with him as she pursues a degree in nursing.

== Development ==
Mädchen Amick, who portrays Shelly Johnson, originally auditioned for the role of Donna but the part ultimately went to Lara Flynn Boyle. Boyle was unable to reprise her role as Donna in the prequel film Twin Peaks: Fire Walk with Me due to scheduling conflicts and was replaced by Moira Kelly.

== Reception ==
In Return to Twin Peaks: New Approaches to Materiality, Theory, and Genre on Television, Jeffrey Andrew Weinstock and Catherine Spooner state:

If Dale Cooper comes under the spell of BOB, then Donna Hayward - a detective in her own right - is both always already and imminently under the spell of the deceased Laura Palmer. In an overarching plot that is replete with splittings and doubles, Donna stands (in) as Laura's melancholic double - which in Freudian terms is to say that she compensates for an incomprehensible loss by incorporating the lost object.
If something compels Donna to model herself after Laura, and thus to metamorphose in certain performative ways - she wears Laura's sunglasses; she alternates between an innocent dedication to the unfortunate and sexual licentiousness; she claims Laura's angelic boyfriend, James Hurley (James Marshall) and takes the measure of his diabolical double, Bobby Briggs (Dana Ashbrook) - she narrowly escapes Laura's fate at the hands of the possessed Leland Palmer...

Sean T. Collins of Rolling Stone included Donna on his list of the 30 Best 'Twin Peaks' Characters stating, "Other images took a tighter hold on audience imaginations, but nothing conveyed the tragedy of Laura Palmer's death like her best friend Donna looking at her empty desk, realizing what it meant, and starting to sob uncontrollably right there in homeroom. Donna was the heart of the high-school-kids material on the show, the character who was the most square and reserved, and also the most cognizant that what happened to Laura could happen to anyone. She gave the dead girl her voice."
