= The Secret Diary of Laura Palmer =

1990 novel by Jennifer Lynch

- Cover of the Pocket Book edition
- Author: Jennifer Lynch
- Language: English
- Genre: Novel; Fictional diary
- Publisher: Pocket Books, a division of Simon & Schuster
- Publication date: 15 September 1990
- Publication place: US
- Media type: Print
- Pages: 184
- ISBN: 99928-828-9-1

The Secret Diary of Laura Palmer is a 1990 spin-off epistolary novel from the television series Twin Peaks by Jennifer Lynch. Lynch, then aged 22, is the daughter of series co-creator David Lynch. It was published between the airing of the first and second season.

The novel is said to be "As seen by Jennifer Lynch," and is written in a matter-of-fact tone from the point of view of Laura Palmer, a small-town teenager —a "good girl gone bad"— who is abused and terrorized by the demonic entity BOB. When Lynch was about 12, she told her father she wanted to find another girl's diary to see if they shared similar feelings or if she was just weird and different. During the production of Twin Peaks, he asked her: 'Do you remember wanting to find that girl's diary?' and then: 'Would you like to write Laura Palmer’s diary?' To which she excitedly agreed. She says she was told by her father and Mark Frost, co-creator of the series, to "be Laura Palmer," and that she "knew Laura so well it was like automatic writing."

== Contents ==
The book begins on Laura's 12th birthday in 1984, and steadily matures in writing style and vocabulary. It recounts standard teenage concerns of her first period, her first kiss, and her relationship with her parents, alongside experiences of sexual abuse, promiscuity, cocaine addiction, and her obsession with death. Laura's poetry foreshadows her murder.

In her third diary entry, dated 23 July 1984, Laura originally states that she had her first nightmare foreshadowing BOB and his crimes in 1983, at the age of 10 or 11. Two years later, in entries dated 24 April and 22 June 1986, she ambiguously writes that she now "suddenly remembers many things" in detail that she does not want to remember, and cannot tell whether they are real, imagined, or implanted. Eventually, however, she starts to believe her new memories: "I think it's real. I think it's real!". (The concept of repressed vs. false memories is later revisited in The Secret History of Twin Peaks.) She also writes of having obsessive thoughts and urges about sex and drug use, and expresses fear that God will damn her to Hell. Laura's two new entries in April and June 1986 leave it unclear whether these newly found memories of what BOB has done to her or their implantation at his hands relate to a time after her 1984 entry, or even what she originally thought to be her first dream of BOB in 1983. She indicates several times that her ordeal began "when I stopped skipping the rope", an allusion to the end of childhood and the beginning of adolescence. In two entries a few months later, on 10 and 11 September 1986, she again considers the possibility that BOB is not real, and in the latter states that BOB denies her "adult joys" that her distressing desires demand.

In a 10 December 1986 entry, she desperately tries to dispel the notion nagging at her that her sinful "thoughts" are BOB's machinations and tries to claim her desires as her own to take responsibility for them. She is first introduced to cocaine in October 1986, and soon becomes an addict. She notes that, on 10 January 1987, she has a disturbing vision or "dream" in which her father Leland angrily questions her about her recent visits to the local brothel, One-Eyed Jack's. On 3 February 1987, while she is suffering of acute cocaine withdrawal, BOB begins conversing with her through her diary notes; throughout the "conversation", she switches back and forth between her own personality and BOB's. She relapses into addiction on 2 April 1987, shamefully admitting that she "loves sex and drugs". She blames BOB for her relapse and, on 24 June 1987, writes that the demonic entity has taken over her life and robbed her of the ability to think and act for herself.

On 12 November 1987, her lovers and drug dealers Leo Johnson and Bobby Briggs find her lying in her pony's stall, too drunk and high to walk. She expresses surprise in her diary that her best friend Donna Hayward is worried about her, thinking that she does not deserve to be loved "because I believe too much in BOB by now". According to that night's entry, the trio spends the rest of the night ("just like Bonnie and Clyde", as Bobby puts it) to drive out with Leo's truck to Low Town a few miles out of Twin Peaks to steal a kilo of cocaine from the local drug syndicate, an undertaking which before long ends in a gang shootout before they arrive home with their new supply. In a cocaine-induced vision, Laura relives the death of her cat Jupiter four years earlier, and runs Leo's truck over another cat that looks just like her deceased pet. The cat's owner, a little girl who resembles a pre-teen Laura, is more shocked by Laura's emotional reaction than the death of her own cat, and she quickly forgives Laura, who is stunned and shamed by the girl's selflessness. She decides to turn her life around and look for a job in the morning. She asks Leo to take her home, but he refuses and forces her to participate in an orgy. When she arrives home in the morning, she discovers BOB in her room. She tries to convince herself that BOB only exists in her head, but he only mocks and verbally abuses her and threatens to return soon.

Later, she starts working two jobs for local hotelier Benjamin Horne—babysitting his mentally handicapped son Johnny and apprenticing in Horne's boutique. In her spare time, she volunteers for Meals on Wheels. She soon falls back into her drug and sex addictions, however, and starts working as a prostitute at One-Eyed Jacks. While at Horne's mansion, she meets therapist Dr. Lawrence Jacoby, who agrees to take her on as a patient.

Her slow realisation of BOB's identity is described, although pages are "missing" from the end of the diary (i.e. the text is lacunose), which ends with an undated entry in late 1989, leaving the reader unable to reach a firm conclusion. Lynch said that "the careful reader will know the clues and who the killer is."

== Commercial success and editions ==
The book reached number four on The New York Times paperback fiction best seller list in October 1990, though some US book stores refused to stock it due to the graphic content. It was published in the UK by Penguin Books in November 1990. Entertainment Weekly called it "gratifyingly faithful to the spirit of Peaks."

On June 10, 2011, Twin Peaks co-creator Mark Frost announced that a new edition of the diary would be published in the fall of 2011, featuring a new foreword by himself and David Lynch.

An audiobook was released in May 2017. It is narrated by Sheryl Lee, who played Laura in the TV series.

== See also ==
- List of fictional diaries
- Twin Peaks books
- Laura's Secret Diary, the eleventh episode of the second season, which features the diary prominently
