= Maddy Ferguson =

Fictional character

- Twin Peaks character
- First appearance: "Episode 3"
- Last appearance: "Episode 29"
- Created by: Mark Frost; David Lynch
- Portrayed by: Sheryl Lee
- Duration: 1990–1991

In-universe information
- Full name: Madeleine "Maddy" Ferguson
- Occupation: Insurance receptionist
- Family: Beth Ferguson (mother); Donald Ferguson (father); Sarah Novack Palmer (aunt); Leland Palmer (uncle); Laura Palmer (cousin)
- Origin: Missoula, Montana
- Nationality: American
- Date of birth: June 22, 1968
- Date of death: March 9, 1989

Madeleine "Maddy" Ferguson is a fictional character in the Twin Peaks franchise. She was created by the series creators David Lynch and Mark Frost and portrayed by Sheryl Lee. Introduced in the fourth episode of the first season, Maddy is the older cousin of Laura Palmer (also played by Lee) who comes to Twin Peaks to help her aunt and uncle cope with the death of their daughter. Over the course of the series, Maddy forms a close friendship with Donna Hayward (Lara Flynn Boyle) and James Hurley (James Marshall), Laura's friends, and assists them in their investigation into her death. Originally, she was not intended to be a part of the series but was created by David Lynch so that Lee could have a larger role in the series.

== Appearances ==
=== In television ===
In Twin Peaks, Maddy first appears midway through the first season, when she travels to Twin Peaks from her hometown of Missoula, Montana (David Lynch's birthplace). She comes to comfort her uncle and aunt, Leland (Ray Wise) and Sarah Palmer (Grace Zabriskie), after the death of their daughter Laura. Maddy is four years older than Laura, but otherwise looks identical apart from her dark hair and glasses. She remarks that she and Laura used to pretend they were sisters. Despite their resemblance, the innocent and sweet Maddy stands in stark contrast to Laura, whose personal life is steeped in deception. Like Laura's mother and Laura herself, Maddy has premonitions, including one of a bloodstain on the floor of the Palmers' living room and another of BOB (Frank Silva), a demonic entity plaguing the town. Maddy quickly befriends Donna Hayward and James Hurley, Laura's closest friends, and helps them in their investigation into Laura's death. At one point, Maddy even wears a blonde wig to lure one of Laura's acquaintances.

During the second season, Maddy begins to resemble her cousin more and more: her hair (though still dark) straightens, she stops wearing her glasses, and in her carriage and demeanor she behaves more like Laura as seen in Twin Peaks: Fire Walk with Me than the Maddy of the first season. This causes conflict with Donna and James when James becomes attracted to her and she begins to return his feelings in spite of herself. Later, she is murdered by Leland Palmer, who is possessed by BOB, in a violent recreation of Laura's murder. Maddy's death quickly leads to Leland's arrest.

A doppelgänger of Maddy later appears to Dale Cooper (Kyle MacLachlan) in the Black Lodge, warning him to "watch out for my cousin".

=== In literature ===
Maddy is referenced numerous times in Jennifer Lynch's novel The Secret Diary of Laura Palmer.

== Conception ==
Originally, Sheryl Lee was only cast to portray Laura Palmer. However, after David Lynch filmed a few scenes with her, he was so impressed that he created the role of Maddy so that Lee could have a larger role in the series.

== Reception ==
In Cult Pop Culture: How the Fringe Became Mainstream, Bob Batchelor states "Through Maddy, the audience is given a chance to view a more innocent, less world-weary Laura Palmer, one that is haunted only by the question of which boy to kiss as she tries to help solve the murder." In Twin Peaks FAQ: All That's Left to Know About a Place Both Wonderful and Strange David Bushman and Arthur Smith note the impact of Maddy's death, stating:

"Maddy emerges as perhaps Twin Peaks most tragic murder victim figure-unlike Laura, Maddy has a chance to connect with the audience over the course of many episodes..."
"It's the single most traumatic sequence in a show that never feared to confront the most lurid and depraved aspects of human nature, and one of the most disturbing murder scenes in the history of the medium. The death of Maddy Ferguson reestablished the seriousness of the stakes in the story of Twin Peaks; however eccentric, campy, and absurd the show could be, it derived from a deep undercurrent of sadness and outrage at the evil that men do."

== See also ==
- Laura Palmer
