= Jennifer Lynch =

American film director (born 1968)

- Born: April 7, 1968 (age 58); Philadelphia, U.S.
- Occupations: Film director; screenwriter
- Years active: 1986–present
- Children: 1
- Relatives: David Lynch (father)

Jennifer Chambers Lynch (born April 7, 1968) is an American film director, screenwriter, and author. The eldest child of filmmaker David Lynch, she made her directorial debut with the film Boxing Helena (1993), which was a critical and commercial failure; despite being nominated for the Grand Jury Prize at the Sundance Film Festival, it earned her a Golden Raspberry Award for Worst Director. The negative reception and controversy surrounding the film led to Lynch taking a 15-year hiatus from filmmaking.

Lynch returned to directing with Surveillance (2008), which received mixed reviews but won the top prize at the Sitges Film Festival. She directed the Bollywood horror film Hisss (2010), which she disowned after the production was completed without her involvement. Her fourth film, Chained (2012), was met with a positive critical reception. She has since focused on television, directing episodes of Psych, Teen Wolf, The Walking Dead, American Horror Story, Once Upon a Time, Hawaii Five-0, Elementary, The Strain, Agents of S.H.I.E.L.D., 9-1-1, and Ratched.

Outside of filmmaking, Lynch wrote the book The Secret Diary of Laura Palmer (1990). Told from the perspective of the character of the same name from her father's television series Twin Peaks, the novel was a commercial success, reaching No. 4 on The New York Times paperback fiction best seller list that year.

== Early life ==
Jennifer Chambers Lynch was born in Philadelphia on April 7, 1968, the daughter of painter Peggy Reavey and filmmaker David Lynch. Two of her father's great-grandparents were Swedish-speaking Finns. She began practicing Transcendental Meditation, which her father famously promoted, at the age of six. She graduated from the Interlochen Art Academy, where she studied visual arts and creative writing.

== Career ==
=== Film ===
Lynch was educated in Los Angeles and Michigan at Interlochen Arts Academy. Together with her mother, Lynch made a brief appearance in her father's debut feature film Eraserhead, but her appearance was not included in the final cut. Lynch subsequently worked as a production assistant on Blue Velvet (1986), also directed by her father.

==== Boxing Helena (1993) ====
Lynch's commissioned screenplay for Boxing Helena, which she would later go on to direct, attracted many actresses, including Madonna. Sherilyn Fenn, one of the stars of both her father's television series Twin Peaks and his film Wild at Heart, was ultimately cast as leading character Helena. Kim Basinger was also attached and was famously sued after resigning from the project. The controversy surrounding that case, as well as feminist outcry over Helena's sadistic subject matter and accusations of nepotism, accompanied the movie's critical drubbing upon its release in 1993.

In a 2009 interview with The Hollywood Interview, Lynch mentions her reactions to the critical reception of Boxing Helena:

I would love to know why people were so mad at me for telling a crazy fairy tale. I'm the first to say I didn't know what I was doing. I did the best I could at 19, and all these crazy things happened. The idea that the film was faulted when everyone involved worked so fucking hard and believed in me, and there were these adults believing in me, who was essentially a child…when the National Organization of Women slammed me, that was sort of the final straw. It was no wonder I put my legs behind my ears and got pregnant. (laughs) Not that I didn't love sex before then, but seriously. It was my child, essentially, who saved my life.

==== Surveillance (2008) ====
Following a lengthy hiatus, Lynch directed Surveillance, which won the top prize at the Festival de Cine de Sitges. A month later, Lynch became the first woman to receive the New York City Horror Film Festival's Best Director award.

==== Hisss (2009) ====
Lynch was announced as director of the film Nagin (the film is also known as Hisss), that featured Bollywood actress Mallika Sherawat, but the film that was released was not Lynch's work, even though the producers attached her name to the final product. Lynch explained in a 2012 interview:

Well, ultimately, I didn't get to make that film. I put my director's cut together, and the producers decided it was not what they wanted. They took it back to India. I never did any scoring or cutting or color-timing or any of the things you do to make the movie. They took the footage and changed it into what they wanted it to be. So it's not my film. I went to India and shot some footage, but I have nothing to do with the movie they made.

==== Chained (2012) ====
Lynch then directed and co-wrote the 2012 thriller film Chained, in which Vincent D'Onofrio stars as a cab-driving serial killer. It received mostly positive reviews from critics, with a 68% rating on review aggregator website, Rotten Tomatoes.

==== Future film projects ====
Lynch was scheduled to film Visibility for the Motion Picture Corporation of America in 2011, but, as of December 2025, this project is not completed.

As of September 2012, Lynch was preparing A Fall from Grace, a film set and filmed in St. Louis and inspired by the Old Chain of Rocks Bridge.

=== Television ===
Lynch has directed episodes of many television series such as Dahmer – Monster: The Jeffrey Dahmer Story, The Watcher, Daredevil, Jessica Jones, Finding Carter, Psych, Quantico, Teen Wolf, The Walking Dead, The Last Ship, Wayward Pines, American Horror Story, The Strain, Once Upon a Time, Hawaii Five-0 and Agents of S.H.I.E.L.D.

=== Other projects ===
Lynch authored The Secret Diary of Laura Palmer to accompany the television show Twin Peaks which was created by her father David Lynch and Mark Frost.

In 1993, Lynch directed the music video "Living in the Rose" by the British rock band New Model Army.

On March 21, 2010, Lynch was a judge at the International Surrealist Film Festival and she worked as producer for the Corey Brandenstein natural horror film The Compound.

An Australian documentary titled Despite the Gods, which chronicles Lynch's struggle to make the film Hisss, was released in 2012. The documentary was shown at the Canadian International Documentary Festival and the program described the film as follows: "Out of her depth shooting on location with an Indian crew and two top Bollywood stars, Lynch turns her production into a vehicle for her own self-actualization, paying no regard to timeline, budget or reality. As the story in front of the camera derails, the story behind the camera explodes". She eventually disowned Hisss.

As of 2015, she is also a member of the board of advisers for the Hollywood Horror Museum.

== Awards and nominations ==
Boxing Helena received incredibly scathing reviews upon its release and a Razzie Award for "Worst Director". Nevertheless, it was nominated for Grand Jury Prize in the Dramatic category at the Sundance Film Festival.

== Personal life ==
Lynch lives in Los Angeles and has a daughter. She revealed in 2009 that she underwent three spinal surgeries in the mid-1990s after getting into a car accident at the age of 19.

== Filmography ==
Film

Year	Title	Director	Writer	Ref.
1993	Boxing Helena	Yes	Yes	
2008	Surveillance	Yes	Yes	
2010	Hisss	Yes	Yes	
2012	Chained	Yes	Yes	

Television

Year	Title	Notes
2012–2013	Psych	3 episodes
2013	The Trouble with Billy	Episode: "Pilot"
2013	Warehouse 13	Episode: "Instinct"
2014–2016	Teen Wolf	4 episodes
2014–2015	Finding Carter	5 episodes (Also supervising producer)
2015	The Walking Dead	2 episodes
2015–2017	Quantico	5 episodes
2015	South of Hell	2 episodes
2016	Second Chance	Episode: "May Old Acquaintance Be Forgot"
2016	Recovery Road	Episode: "Sick as Our Secrets"
2016	Damien	Episode: "The Devil You Know"
2016	Wayward Pines	Episode: "Pass Judgement"
2016	The Last Ship	Episode: "Sea Change"
2016	Once Upon a Time	Episode: "I'll Be Your Mirror"
2016–2024	American Horror Story	12 episodes
2016–2018	Hawaii Five-O	2 episodes
2017	Salem	2 episodes
2017	Criminal Minds: Beyond Borders	Episode: "Abominable"
2017	Salvation	Episode: "Keeping the Faith"
2017	Zoo	Episode: "Cradles and Graves"
2017	The Strain	Episode: "The Traitor"
2017–2018	Elementary	2 episodes
2018	Kevin (Probably) Saves the World	Episode: "Caught White-Handed"
2018	Jessica Jones	Episode: "AKA Three Lives and Counting"
2018	Agents of S.H.I.E.L.D.	Episode: "All Roads Lead..."
2018	Code Black	Episode: "Change of Heart"
2018	Daredevil	Episode: "Revelations"
2018–2025	9-1-1	7 episodes
2020	9-1-1: Lone Star	Episode: "Texas Proud"
2020	Ratched	Episode: "The Bucket List"
2020	Big Sky	2 episodes
2021–2023	Gossip Girl	4 episodes
2022	Dahmer – Monster: The Jeffrey Dahmer Story	4 episodes
2022	The Watcher	2 episodes
2024	Feud: Capote vs. The Swans	Episode: "Beautiful Babe"
2024	American Sports Story	Episode: "What's Left Behind"
2025–2026	Matlock	3 episodes
2025–2026	The Rookie	2 episodes
2025–2026	Watson	2 episodes
2025	Doctor Odyssey	Episode: "Casino Week"
2025	Murdaugh: Death in the Family	Episode: "Controlled Burn"
