= Bob (Twin Peaks) =

Twin Peaks character

- Twin Peaks character
- Frank Silva as Bob in a promotional still for Twin Peaks
- First appearance: "Pilot" (1990)
- Last appearance: "Part 17" (2017)
- Created by: Mark Frost and David Lynch
- Portrayed by: Frank Silva
- Duration: 1990–1992, 2017

In-universe information
- Gender: Male
- Affiliated with: Black and White Lodge
- Date of birth: c. 1945
- Date of death: October 2, 2016

"Bob" is the self-proclaimed name of the paranormal entity who is a fictional character and the main antagonist of the Twin Peaks franchise, played by Frank Silva. He is an interdimensional entity who feeds on pain and sorrow. An inhabiting spirit, he possesses human beings and then commits acts of rape and murder in order to feast on the suffering of his victims. In the film Fire Walk with Me, this suffering is called "garmonbozia" and can manifest in the form of creamed corn.

== Background ==
In the ABC television series Twin Peaks (1990–1991), Bob made his first appearance in the pilot episode, "Northwest Passage", where he makes a brief appearance in a vision seen by Sarah Palmer. The character eventually grew into the series' main antagonist in the second season. Silva, a set dresser on the pilot, was given the role of Bob after a reflection of his face in a mirror was accidentally captured by the camera during filming. When series creator David Lynch saw Silva's face, he liked it so much he kept it in the show, and cast him as Bob. Although he died before production on the 2017 revival began, he appears in the series through archival footage and CGI.

== Character arc ==
=== Twin Peaks ===
Bob is an interdimensional entity from the Black Lodge, a realm which exists on an alternate plane of reality. While "possessing" humans, he commits horrible crimes to elicit pain, fear, and suffering in those around him. In a series of promotional trading cards issued for Twin Peaks, his birth date is listed as "From the beginning of time", and his "accomplishments" are listed as "I have survived as long as man has been on earth."

During his investigation of Laura Palmer's (Sheryl Lee) murder, FBI Special Agent Dale Cooper (Kyle MacLachlan) first learns of Bob's existence in a vision, in which he encounters another entity named Mike (Al Strobel). In this vision, Cooper learns that Bob was in life a serial killer who raped and murdered young women, with Mike as his accomplice. Mike eventually repented, removing his left arm in order to be rid of the tattoo that he shared with Bob. At the beginning of the second season, one of Bob's intended victims, Ronnette Pulaski (Phoebe Augustine), awakens from a coma induced by her torture at Bob's hands, at which time she identifies Bob as Laura's killer. Cooper and the Twin Peaks Sheriff department canvass the town with wanted posters of Bob. Leland Palmer (Ray Wise), Laura's father, identifies the man in the poster as "Robertson", and says that he lived near his grandfather and used to taunt Leland when he was a child.

When Leland talks about knowing Bob as a child and says this was someone who invited me to play and I invited him in, there's a certain classic type of vampire myth that comes into play when a soul that invites something into it to take part in its life cannot then refuse it anything. That's a myth that goes way back before pre-Christian times and that's one possible explanation... the other is that Leland is just completely whacked out of his mind

— Mark Frost, describing Bob's psychic power, from the book Twin Peaks: Behind-the-scenes: An Unofficial Visitors Guide to Twin Peaks

It is later revealed that Bob is, in fact, possessing Leland, and has been ever since Leland first met him as a child at his grandfather's house. Under Bob's influence, Leland sexually abused his own daughter for years, and finally murdered her. Leland is also under Bob's control when he murders Leland's niece Maddy Ferguson (Lee), who looks just like Laura. Upon learning the truth, Cooper lures Bob into a trap by tricking Leland into allowing himself to be questioned. Under interrogation, Bob takes control and taunts Cooper before forcing Leland to bash his head repeatedly into the wall, sustaining fatal injuries. In his dying breaths, Leland states when he was a child he saw Bob in a dream and invited him inside, before stating that he never knew when Bob was in control of his body. After Leland dies, Cooper engages in a philosophical debate with Sheriff Harry Truman (Michael Ontkean) and Albert Rosenfield (Miguel Ferrer) over how real Bob was, and whether or not Bob was in fact a physical incarnation of Leland's personal demons. Although the men cannot agree on a unifying idea, they do come to the conclusion that Bob is a manifestation of "the evil that men do".

Cooper sees a vision of Bob taunting him shortly after Josie Packard (Joan Chen) has a sudden heart attack as he tries to arrest her. It is implied that Bob caused the heart attack by flooding her body and soul with terror, literally frightening her to death.

In the final episode, Cooper ventures into the Black Lodge to apprehend his former partner, rogue FBI Agent Windom Earle (Kenneth Welsh), who is attempting to harness the power of the Lodge for himself. When Earle tries to strike a bargain with Cooper in which Cooper will sell his soul to Earle in exchange for Earle sparing Cooper's lover, Annie Blackburn (Heather Graham), Bob appears and reverses time in the Lodge to the moment before Cooper agreed to sell his soul. Bob informs Cooper that the Black Lodge is his domain, and thus Earle has trespassed by coming into it and demanding Cooper's soul for himself. As a punishment, Bob kills Earle, taking Earle's soul for himself. Cooper attempts to flee, but Bob traps him in the Lodge, exiting inside of a doppelgänger of Cooper. The series ends with Bob maniacally laughing alongside the doppelgänger in a mirror.

=== 2017 revival ===
The 2017 revival explores Bob's origins in "Part 8", showing that an orb bearing his face was created or unleashed upon the world by the Experiment during the first atomic bomb test in 1945. The appearance of Bob's orb is witnessed by The Fireman (Carel Struycken), who creates an orb bearing the face of Laura Palmer in response.

In the present, Bob continues to inhabit Cooper's doppelgänger ("Mr. C") and appears as an orb inside of his body. If the doppelgänger suffers a fatal injury, a group of Woodsmen dig Bob out of his body and Bob returns to the doppelgänger when he is revived.

After the doppelgänger is shot and killed by Lucy Moran (Kimmy Robertson), Bob is again removed from his body, but quickly finds himself confronted by Freddie Sykes (Jake Wardle), who was given a supernatural glove by the Fireman, which is the only thing that physically can harm Bob. The two fight, which ends with Freddie killing Bob by shattering him into pieces when he transforms into his 'orb' form.

== Conceptual history ==
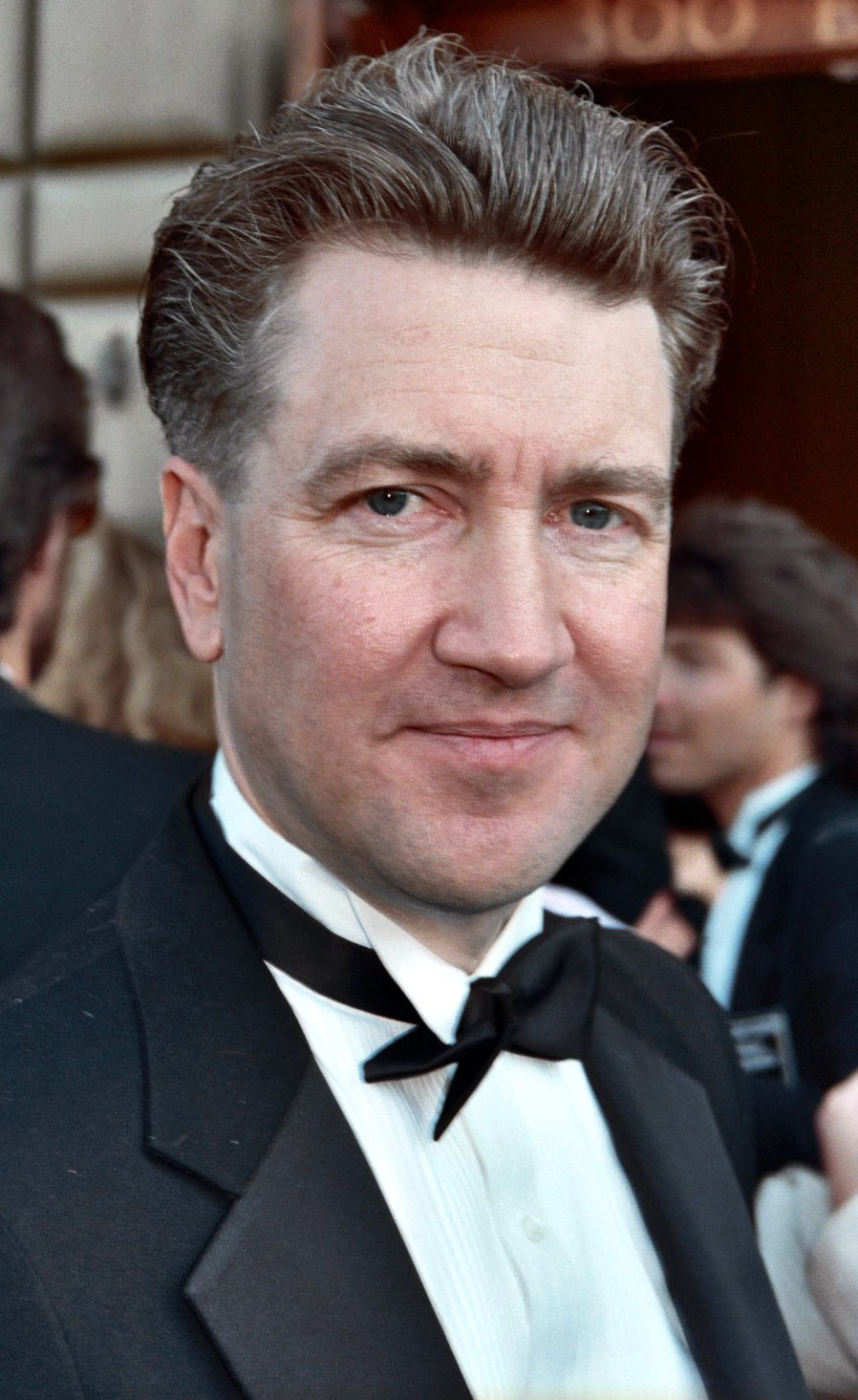
David Lynch, the creator of the Killer Bob character, in 1990

The impetus for the series Twin Peaks was the mystery of who killed Laura Palmer. During the filming of a scene in the pilot, "Northwest Passage", taking place in Laura's room, Frank Silva, a set dresser, accidentally trapped himself in the room by inadvertently moving a dresser in front of the door. When told of the incident, Lynch had an image of Silva stuck in the room and thought it could fit into the series. After filming him crouched at the foot of Laura's bed, looking through the bars of the footboard, as if he were "trapped" behind them, Lynch filmed the scene a second time, without Silva. After reviewing the footage, Lynch liked Silva's presence so much that he decided to make him part of the series.

Later that day, a scene was being filmed in which Laura's mother experiences a terrifying vision; at the time, the script did not indicate what Mrs Palmer had seen. Lynch was pleased with how the scene turned out, but a crew member informed him that it would have to be re-shot, because a mirror in the scene had inadvertently picked up Silva's reflection. Lynch considered this a "happy accident", and decided that Silva's unnamed character would be revealed as Laura's true killer. At the 2013 Twin Peaks Retrospective at USC, Phoebe Augustine, who played Ronette Pulaski, recalled being afraid of Silva as she noticed him standing out among the crew while filming her scene on the railroad tracks in the pilot episode. When Augustine told Lynch she was becoming afraid of Silva and asked who he was, Lynch, according to Augustine, said, "That's the bad guy, but don't tell anyone."

== Legacy ==
In 2016, Rolling Stone ranked him No. 5 of their "40 Greatest TV Villains of All Time".
