= Leland Palmer =

Fictional character from Twin Peaks

- Twin Peaks character
- Ray Wise as Leland Palmer in Twin Peaks: Fire Walk With Me (1992)
- First appearance: "Pilot" (1990)
- Last appearance: "Part 18" (2017)
- Created by: Mark Frost; David Lynch
- Portrayed by: Ray Wise; Phil Hartman (SNL)
- Duration: 1990–1992, 2017

In-universe information
- Gender: Male
- Occupation: Attorney at law
- Affiliation: Benjamin Horne (client); Black Lodge (through BOB)
- Family: Palmer
- Relatives: Sarah Palmer (wife); Laura Palmer (daughter, deceased); Beth (sister-in-law); Maddy Ferguson (niece)
- Origin: Seattle, Washington
- Nationality: American
- Education: University of Washington
- Date of birth: February 26, 1944
- Date of death: March 11, 1989 (Note: Original timeline death as seen in "Episode 16".); February 24, 1990 (Note: Altered date of death due to time alterations in "Part 17".)

Leland Palmer is a fictional character from the television series Twin Peaks (1990–1991; 2017), and one of the main characters in the prequel film, Twin Peaks: Fire Walk with Me. He was created by Mark Frost and David Lynch, and is portrayed in all his appearances by Ray Wise.

Leland is an attorney, with his primary client being local businessman Ben Horne (Richard Beymer). He is well-known and respected in the town of Twin Peaks. Together with his wife Sarah (Grace Zabriskie) and his daughter Laura (Sheryl Lee), his family seems to be perfect. When Laura is murdered, however, Leland's psychological foundations begin to crumble, and it is gradually revealed that extreme dysfunction, including incest, lies beneath the Palmer family's idyllic surface.

== Appearances ==
=== Twin Peaks ===
In the pilot episode of the series, Leland is called into the morgue to identify Laura's body. The grief pushes him over the edge; he throws himself into the grave at Laura's funeral and has to be dragged out, and for the next few weeks he manically asks people - even complete strangers - to dance with him as Laura had, all while sobbing hysterically.

When Jacques Renault (Walter Olkewicz) is arrested as a suspect in Laura's murder, Leland murders him by suffocating him with a pillow. After killing Jacques, Leland's hair turns white overnight. Leland is arrested, but released on a personal recognizance bond pending trial due to personal assurances made by Sheriff Harry S. Truman (Michael Ontkean) that he does not pose any danger to the community. Leland's behavior at times appears abnormal - manically happy at times, exhibited by singing the 1940s popular nonsense song "Mairzy Doats", before crashing into grief. The arrival of his niece-in-law Madeline "Maddy" Ferguson, who looks almost exactly like Laura (both roles are played by Sheryl Lee), is of great help to him in learning how to deal with his daughter's death.

It is eventually revealed that, as a boy, Leland met a strange neighbor who turned out to be a demonic entity named BOB (Frank Silva), who would possess him throughout his life. It is also implied that BOB molested him as a child. It is difficult to tell when and if Leland is truly in control of himself and when he is being possessed by BOB. It is implied that Leland killed Renault on his own – not under BOB's control – and that Leland is lost from that point: he is no longer able to stop BOB and is completely taken over, physically manifested by the change of hair color and a dramatic change in behavior. Finally, BOB takes control of Leland and murders Maddy. The changes in Leland from this point help Special Agent Dale Cooper (Kyle MacLachlan) to finally identify him as BOB's "host".

Leland is eventually exposed as the murderer of both his daughter and his niece Maddy and is arrested by Cooper and Truman. He later dies in custody following a bizarre interrogation on the night of his arrest. BOB takes control of Leland and forces him to run headfirst into the metal door of an interrogation room. At the moment of his death, Leland remembers the crimes he committed under BOB's control, and cries out in agony. After Cooper recites the last rites from the Tibetan Book of the Dead, Leland sees a vision of his daughter Laura and dies. Later on, Cooper explains to the widowed Sarah that he believes the vision was of Laura forgiving Leland and welcoming him into the afterlife.

In the final episode of the series, Cooper encounters a grinning doppelgänger of Leland in the Black Lodge, who says "I did not kill anybody."

=== Twin Peaks: Fire Walk With Me ===
The prequel film Fire Walk With Me, which depicts the last week of Laura's life, reveals that BOB had begun raping her when she was 12 years old while possessing Leland. The abuse drives Laura into a life of drug addiction and promiscuity, and she begins working as a call girl. She often turns tricks together with Teresa Banks - whom Leland frequently visits while away on business. He arranges a "party" with Banks and two other girls, only to find out that the two girls are Laura and her friend Ronette Pulaski (Phoebe Augustine). He pays Banks and leaves, but comes back later that night and beats her to death.

A year later, he sees Laura having group sex with Pulaski, Renault and Leo Johnson (Eric Da Re); enraged, BOB uses Leland to attack, beat and rape both girls, before killing Laura, even as Leland begs BOB not to make him do it. He wraps Laura's body in plastic and dumps it in a river. He then appears in the Black Lodge, where he meets The Man From Another Place (Michael J. Anderson) and MIKE (Al Strobel), BOB's former partner in murder.

=== Series relaunch ===
When Twin Peaks was revived in 2017, Ray Wise confirmed that he would appear in the new series, once again portraying Leland Palmer. In the second episode of the renewed series, Leland appears in the Black Lodge imploring Cooper to "find Laura". In Part 18, he also repeats his instructions to Cooper when he returns to the Black Lodge. Due to time alterations following Part 17, it is said that Leland committed suicide on February 24, 1990, one year after his daughter's disappearance (she was never confirmed to have been murdered in the changed timeline).

== Reception ==
Ray Wise has been met with critical acclaim for his performance of Leland Palmer. Oliver Machnaughton of The Guardian called a scene where Leland confronts Laura over dinner in Fire Walk with Me "one of the most upsetting, uncomfortably effective portrayals of parental maltreatment in all of cinema," stating that Wise "balances the loving, sympathetic father versus the abusive control freak." Commenting on Leland being the killer of Laura Palmer, Terry Morgan of Backstage stated that Wise was "so good at playing Leland—so tortured, creepily funny, horrifying—that viewers forgot they were playing detective and were simply dazzled by a bravura performance."

Sean T. Collins of Rolling Stone stated that "you'd have to turn to James Gandolfini to find a performance of fatherhood as nuanced, heartbreaking, and horrifying as Ray Wise's portrayal of the Palmer family patriarch. Is he a decent man broken by grief? A victim turned victimizer despite his best efforts? A monster preying upon the powerless beneath a veneer of suburban sanity? He was all these things, and in Wise's wide-eyed face you can see each facet of his personality fighting to hide itself from the others. No matter where you see him show up now, the menace of Leland Palmer oozes off him like the stench of burning oil."
