= Sheryl Lee =

American actress (born 1967)

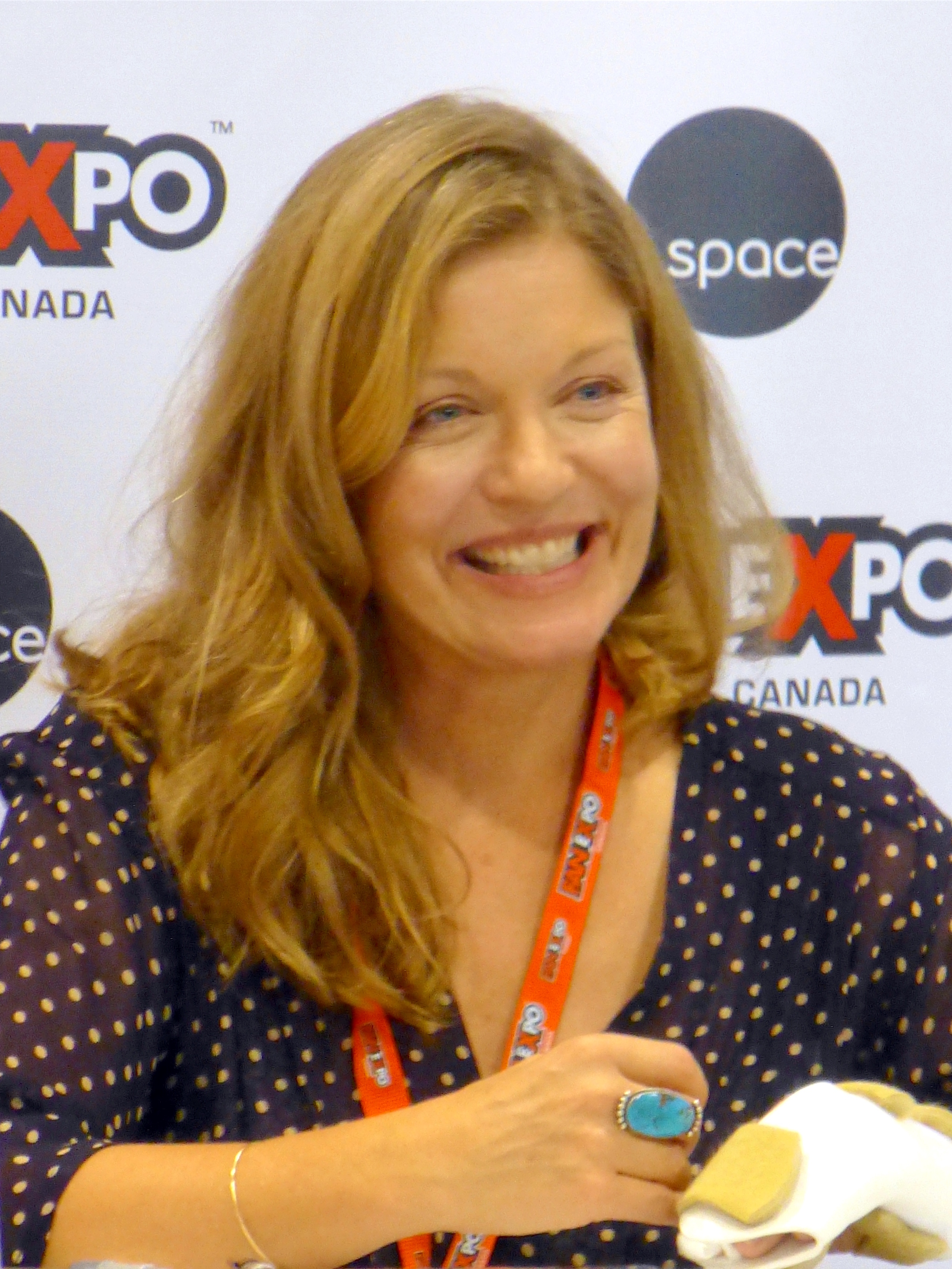
- Lee at the Fan Expo Canada in 2014
- Born: April 22, 1967 (age 59); Augsburg, Bavaria, West Germany
- Education: University of Colorado Boulder
- Occupation: Actress
- Years active: 1986–present
- Known for: Twin Peaks
- Spouse: Jesse Diamond (m. 2000, divorced)
- Children: 1

Sheryl Lee (born April 22, 1967) is an American actress of stage, film and television. After studying acting in college, Lee relocated to Seattle, Washington to work in theater, where she was cast by David Lynch as Laura Palmer and Maddy Ferguson on the 1990 television series Twin Peaks and in the 1992 film Twin Peaks: Fire Walk with Me. After completing Twin Peaks, she returned to theater, appearing in the title role of Salome on Broadway opposite Al Pacino.

Her film roles include Astrid Kirchherr in Backbeat (1994), Helga/Resi Noth in the drama Mother Night (1996), the role of Katrina in John Carpenter's Vampires (1998) and the part of April in Winter's Bone (2010). She has had recurring roles on such television series as One Tree Hill (2005–06) and Dirty Sexy Money (2007–2009), and later reprised her role of Laura Palmer in the Showtime revival of Twin Peaks in 2017.

== Early life ==
Lee was born in Augsburg, Bavaria, West Germany to American parents (an artist mother and architect father); the first of three children. She grew up in Boulder, Colorado, United States, where she was a graduate of Fairview High School (class of 1985). After graduating, Lee moved to Pasadena, California where she studied at the American Academy of Dramatic Arts, and later attended the North Carolina School of the Arts, the National Theatre Conservatory in Denver, and the University of Colorado.

After several years of studying, Lee moved to Seattle, Washington where she acted in several stage plays and appeared in several commercials. She studied with theater director Mark Jenkins at the now-defunct Empty Space Theater in Seattle.

== Career ==
=== 1986–1993: Career beginnings and Twin Peaks ===
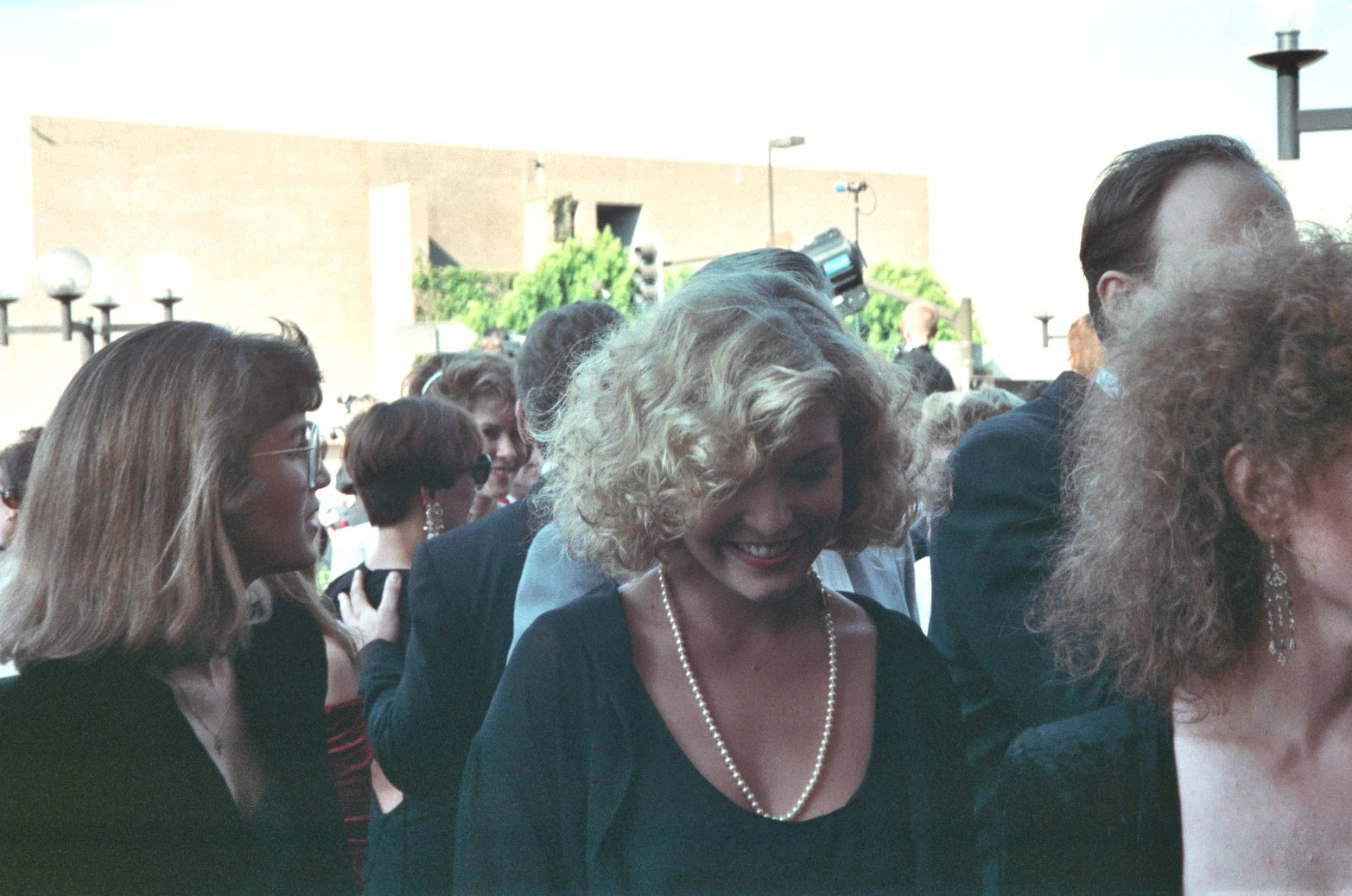
Lee arriving at the 1990 Emmy Awards

Lee's first television role was as the dead Laura Palmer in the television series Twin Peaks. To save on money, creator David Lynch intended to cast a local girl from Seattle "just to play a dead girl". That local girl ended up being Sheryl Lee. Lynch asked her to audition for him after seeing a publicity photo of her in Seattle from one of the plays she was starring in at the time. "But no one — not Mark, me, anyone — had any idea that she could act, or that she was going to be so powerful just being dead." The image of Lee wrapped in plastic, as well as her homecoming queen photograph, became among the show's most enduring and memorable images. When Lynch shot the home movie that James Hurley takes of Donna Hayward and Laura, he realized that Lee had something special. "She did do another scene — the video with Donna on the picnic — and it was that scene that did it." As a result, Sheryl Lee became a semi-regular addition to the cast, appearing in flashbacks as Laura, and becoming a recurring character, Laura's cousin Maddy Ferguson, later in the series (a role which was reportedly written because Lynch, impressed with her abilities, wanted to give her a fuller role on the show). She worked again with Lynch when she appeared as Glinda the Good Witch in Wild at Heart (1990).

She also starred in the prequel Twin Peaks: Fire Walk with Me, which elaborated on events leading up to Laura Palmer's death. While the film itself was a critical and financial failure at the time of its release, Lee was praised by the critics for her performance, which earned her Best Actress nominations at the Independent Spirit Awards and the Saturn Awards. For her work in Twin Peaks, Lee has been described as a "Scream queen", in particular for scenes in the otherworldly Black Lodge.

In 1992, Lee starred as Salome alongside Al Pacino in the Broadway production of Oscar Wilde's Salome in the Circle in the Square Theatre under the direction of Robert Allan Ackerman. The play co-starred Suzanne Bertish, Esai Morales and Arnold Vosloo.

=== 1994–2004: Post-Twin Peaks career ===
In 1994, she was cast as Astrid Kirchherr in the film Backbeat, a biopic of the early career of The Beatles opposite Stephen Dorff. The following years, Lee played the part of Liza in Gary Walkow's 1995 adaptation of Fyodor Dostoevsky's novella Notes from Underground opposite Henry Czerny, the role of Helga and Resi Noth in the 1996 romantic war film Mother Night, based on Kurt Vonnegut's 1961 novel of the same name, starred alongside Craig Sheffer in Bliss (1997) and played the role of Katrina in John Carpenter's 1998 film Vampires opposite James Woods and Daniel Baldwin. She played also a leading role in the 1999 crime drama film Angel's Dance with Kyle Chandler and Jim Belushi and starred as Dr. Sarah Church in the short-lived series L.A. Doctors (1998—1999) which ran for a single season.

Lee starred opposite Anthony Michael Hall as the sweet but vengeful housewife Eve Robbins in the 2001 USA Cable movie Hitched.

In 2001, she presented the I Love 1990 segment of the BBC's popular I Love 1990s series.

There is speculation that she (and Phoebe Augustine, who played her friend Ronette in Twin Peaks) appeared in David Lynch's Mulholland Drive (2001). Many online databases even list them as appearing uncredited in the movie, but it's unknown if it's actually them or actresses who look similar to Laura and Ronette, and it has never been confirmed either way.

She played the leading role of Elinore Murphy in Children on Their Birthdays (2002), based on the short story of the same title by Truman Capote. In the 2003 television series Kingpin, she played the role of Marlene Cadena opposite Yancey Arias and Bobby Cannavale.

In 2004, Lee was the original choice for the role of Mary Alice Young on Desperate Housewives. It would have been the second time she would have played a dead character on a series; however, the producers ultimately chose to replace her with Brenda Strong, as producers thought that Lee was not right for the part. Strong commented on the casting change for her character, explaining, "I think it was a conceptual shift ... There certainly wasn't something wrong with what [Lee] did. It was just that instead of vanilla they wanted chocolate, and I happened to be chocolate."

=== 2005–present: Return to television and independent films ===
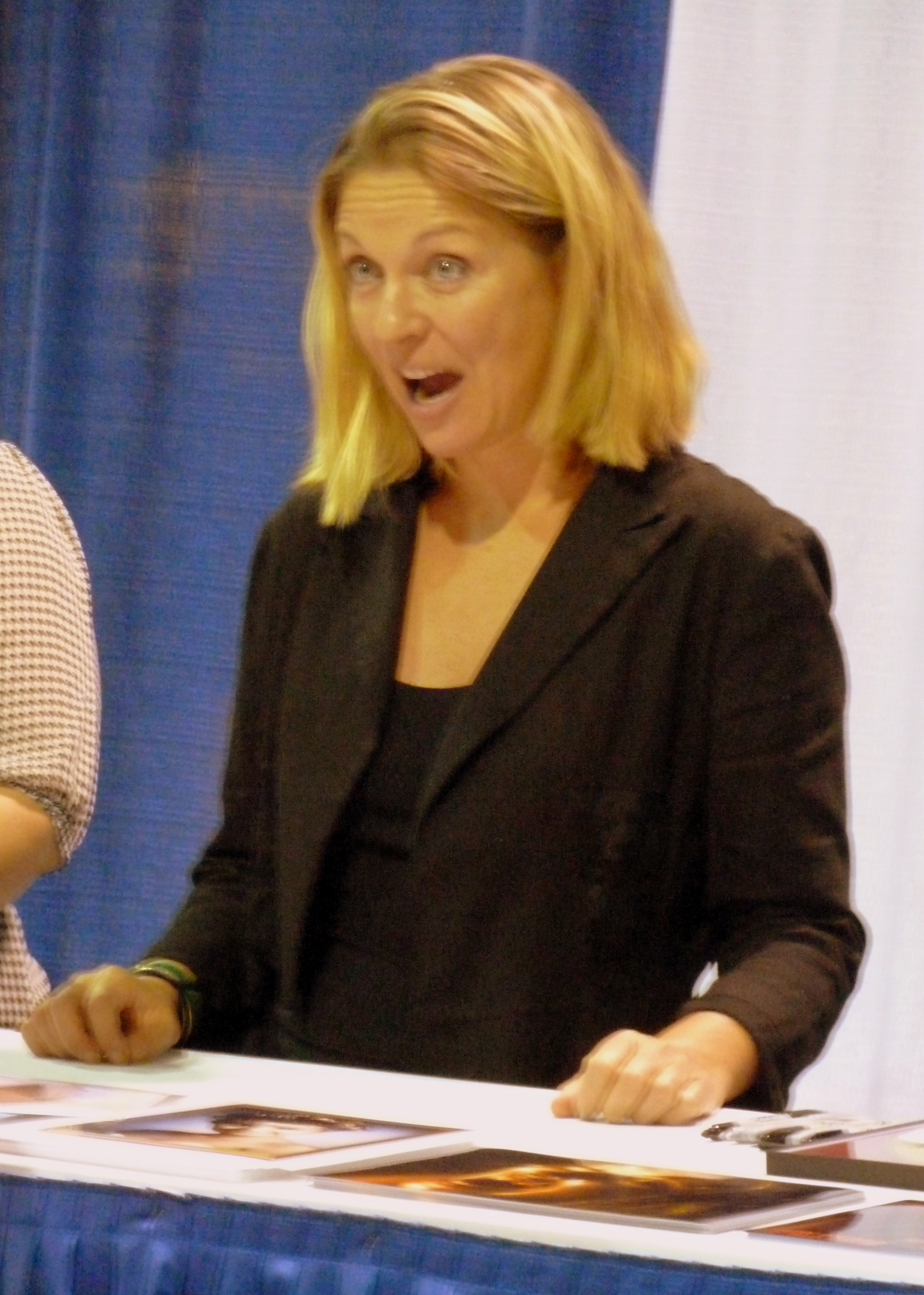
Lee attending the Wizard World Chicago in 2012

In 2005–06, she played the recurring role of Ellie Harp, the biological mother of Peyton Sawyer (played by Hilarie Burton), who battles breast cancer, on the third season of the WB Network series One Tree Hill. In 2007 and 2008, Lee appeared on the ABC dramedy Dirty Sexy Money as Andrea Smithson, the mother of Brian Darling's (Glenn Fitzgerald) illegitimate child. Lee, along with several other Twin Peaks cast members, guest starred in a special Twin Peaks-themed episode of Psych titled "Dual Spires." Other cast members reunited with Lee included Sherilyn Fenn (Audrey Horne), Dana Ashbrook (Bobby Briggs), Ray Wise (Leland Palmer), Lenny Von Dohlen (Harold Smith), Robyn Lively (Lana Budding Milford), and Catherine E. Coulson (The Log Lady).

In 2010, she appeared in a supporting role as April in Debra Granik's Winter's Bone (which won best picture at the Sundance Film Festival in 2010). The film is about a seventeen-year-old girl (Jennifer Lawrence) in the rural Ozarks, caring for her mentally-ill mother and her younger brother and sister, when she discovers that her father put their house and land up as a bond for a court appearance, at which he failed to appear. Lee won two Awards for Best Ensemble at Detroit Film Critics Society and Gotham Awards, shared with the cast. Lee played Lucie Sliger in the 2011 crime thriller Texas Killing Fields alongside Jessica Chastain, Sam Worthington and Chloë Grace Moretz.

In the art drama thriller White Bird in a Blizzard (2014), written and directed by Gregg Araki, she played May opposite Shailene Woodley and Eva Green. In 2015, at the Twin Peaks UK Festival, Lee confirmed that she would be returning to Twin Peaks for the 2017 limited Showtime run.

In 2016, she appeared in a supporting role as Air in the Netflix production Rebirth, which premiered at the Tribeca Film Festival, and had a small part as Karen in Café Society, written and directed by Woody Allen. The film had its premiere at the 2016 Cannes Film Festival. In 2017, she reprised her role as Laura Palmer in Twin Peaks and also playing the part of Carrie Page, making it her third character in the series. Although she was credited in every one of the 18 episodes, most of her appearance was in archive footage. New material of her was seen in the episodes Part 2, Part 17 and Part 18. The same year, she starred as Alley in the short film Dead Ink Archive by David Schendel, making it their second collaboration after the 1994 film The Can (which was filmed in the late 1980s). In 2018, Lee played one of the leads in the Teen-Thriller Deadly Scholars (also known as #SquadGoals) as Emily Hodges.

In 2019, Lee returned to Theater, playing alongside Judd Nelson in Love Letters. She performed the play before in 1991 with Luke Perry and Tim Daly as co-stars.

The 2020-released book Laura's Ghost: Women Speak about Twin Peaks by Courtenay Stallings, which explores the legacy of the fictional character Laura Palmer, played by Lee in the television show Twin Peaks, features interviews and a foreword from Lee.

== Personal life ==
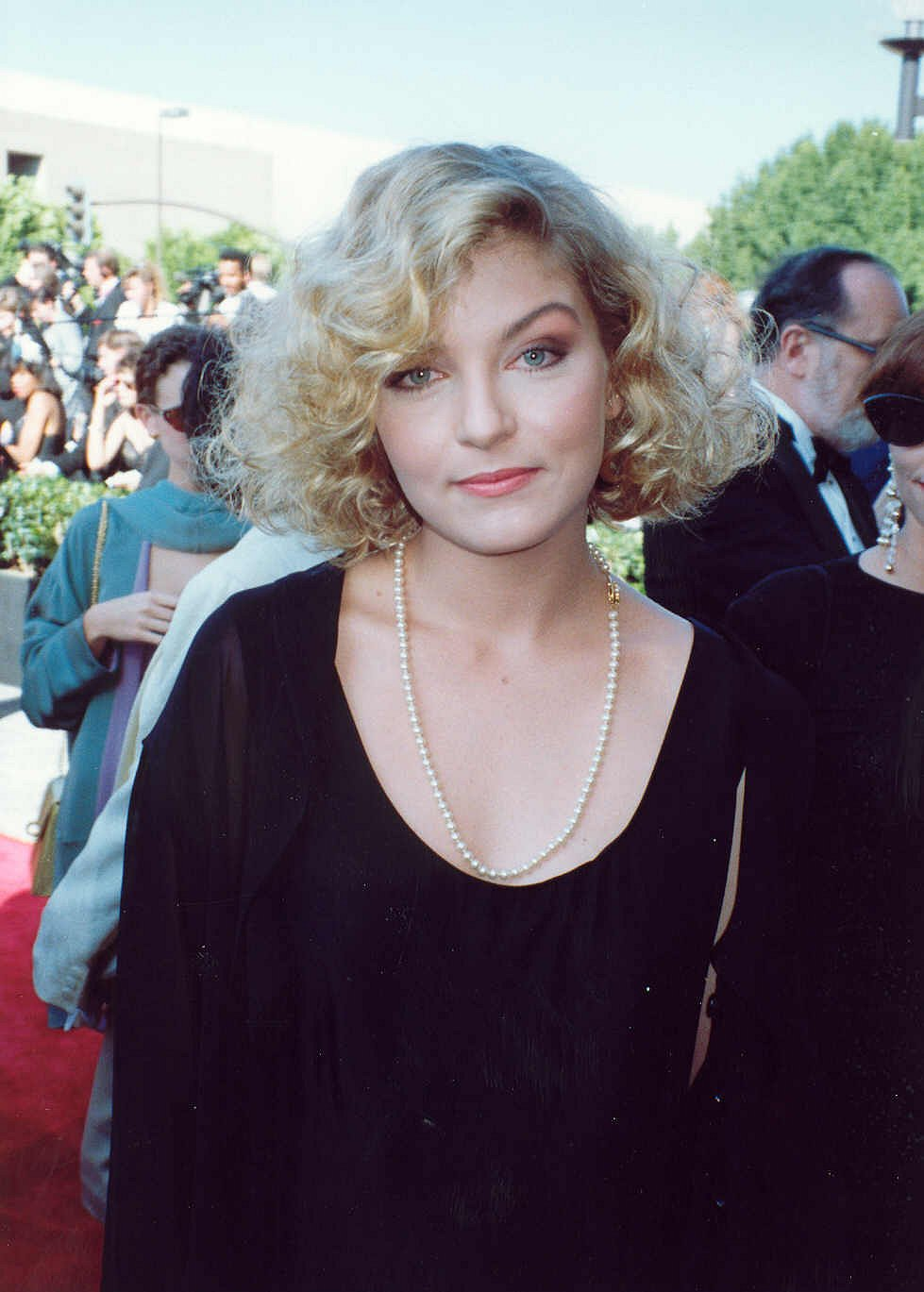
Lee at 42nd Emmy Awards (1990)

Lee dated David Duchovny, who was one of her Twin Peaks cast-mates. She was at one time married to Jesse Diamond, a photographer and son of singer and songwriter Neil Diamond. They have a son, born in 2000.

In 2014, Lee revealed that she had been diagnosed with a rare blood disorder called neutropenia.

Lee is also a teacher at UCLA School of Theater, Film and Television. Together with her former Twin Peaks castmate Gary Hershberger (who played Mike Nelson), Lee teaches actors, directors and writers at their workshop "The Actor's Director Workshop".

=== Philanthropy and activism ===
Lee is an animal rights and environmental activist. She appeared in two PETA campaigns in 1999 and 2000.

In October 2008, Lee participated in the 3rd Munchkin's Project Pink annual breast cancer awareness campaign to raise money for breast cancer research.

Additionally, Lee has also participated in various environmentalist events and charities: In November 2000, she attended the premiere of the public awareness campaign Why Are We Here?, to raise awareness for biodiversity protection, In 2011, Lee attended the iMatter March in Denver, Colorado to raise awareness about climate change, and also supported the Ride for Renewables project to promote renewable energy. In December 2011, Lee advocated the protection of wolves and supported the "Wolves in the American West" campaign for the environmental organization WildEarth Guardians.

In September 2012, Lee signed environmental activist Tom Weis's open letter calling on President Barack Obama and Governor Mitt Romney to withdraw their support for the construction of the southern leg of Keystone XL, a pipeline that would transport bitumen from Montana to Texas. Other signatories included climate scientist James Hansen and actors Daryl Hannah, Mariel Hemingway, and Ed Begley Jr.

On December 8, 2012, Lee performed poems written by herself as part of a collaborative performance along with artist Marina DeBris, dancer Maya Gabay, and musician Marla Leigh, for the U.S. National Committee for UN Women's First Annual Special Assembly: Women, Climate Change, and Human Rights.

== Filmography ==
=== Film ===
Year	Title	Role	Notes
1988	He's No Hero	Liz	Short film
1990	Wild at Heart	The Good Witch	
1992	Twin Peaks: Fire Walk with Me	Laura Palmer	
1992	Jersey Girl	Tara	
1993	Mr. Jones	June	Uncredited
1994	Backbeat	Astrid Kirchherr	
1994	The Can	Angelique Carmel	filmed in 1988
1994	Don't Do It	Michelle	
1995	Fall Time	Patty / Carol	
1995	Homage	Lucy Samuel	
1995	Notes from Underground	Liza	
1996	Mother Night	Helga Noth / Resi Noth	
1997	This World, Then the Fireworks	Lois Archer	
1997	Bliss	Maria	
1997	The Blood Oranges	Fiona	
1998	Vampires	Katrina	
1998	Kiss the Sky	Andy	
1998	Dante's View	Sam Kingsley	
1999	Angel's Dance	Angelica "Angel" Chaste	
2002	Children on Their Birthdays	Elinore Murphy	
2006	Paradise, Texas	Betsy Kinney	
2010	Winter's Bone	April	
2011	Texas Killing Fields	Lucie Sliger	
2014	White Bird in a Blizzard	May	
2014	Twin Peaks: The Missing Pieces	Laura Palmer	Archived footage
2014	Jackie & Ryan	Miriam	
2014	The Makings of You	Judy	also known as Never My Love; Producer
2016	Rebirth	Air	
2016	Café Society	Karen Stern	
2017	Dead Ink Archive	Alley	Short film
2018	Deadly Scholars	Emily Hodges	also known as #SquadGoals
2019	Down to Nothing	Brandy	Short film
2022	The Wild One	Wolf (voice)	Short film
2022	Today As I Run	Mother Wolf (voice)	Short film
2025	I Live Here Now	Martha	
TBA	Unplugged	Shelly / Wisdom (voice)	Post-production

=== Television and web ===
Year	Title	Role	Notes
1990–1991	Twin Peaks	Laura Palmer / Maddy Ferguson	Series regular 18 episodes
1991	Love, Lies and Murder	Patti Bailey	Miniseries
1992	Red Shoe Diaries	Kate Lyons	Episode: "Jake's Story"
1994	Guinevere	Guinevere	Television film
1994	Dr. Quinn, Medicine Woman	Catherine	Episode: "Another Woman"
1994	Aaahh!!! Real Monsters	Actress (voice)	Episode: "Krumm Goes Hollywood"
1995	Follow the River	Mary Draper Ingles	Television film
1997	David	Bathsheba	Miniseries
1998–1999	L.A. Doctors	Dr. Sarah Church	Main role 22 episodes
2001	Hitched	Eve Robbins	Television film
2001	I Love the '90s	Herself / Presenter	Episode: "I Love 1990"
2003	Kingpin	Marlene McDillon Cadena	Miniseries
2003	Without a Trace	Tina Hodges	Episode: "Coming Home"
2004	Desperate Housewives	Mary Alice Young	Unaired television pilot
2005–2006	One Tree Hill	Elizabeth "Ellie" Harp	9 episodes
2006	The Secrets of Comfort House	Wendy	Television film
2006	CSI: NY	Ellen Garner	Episode: "And Here's To You, Mrs Azrael"
2006	House M.D.	Stephanie Green	Episode: "Cane and Able"
2007	Manchild	Mary	Television pilot
2007	State of Mind	Leslie Petrovsky	Episode: "Pilot"
2007–2009	Dirty Sexy Money	Andrea Smithson	12 episodes
2010	Lie to Me	Janet Brooks	Episode: "Bullet Bump"
2010	Psych	Dr. Donna Gooden	Episode: "Dual Spires"
2012	Perception	Lacey Pinderhall	Episode: "86'd"
2016	Rosewood	Brenda Downs	Episode: "Keratin & Kissyface"
2017	Twin Peaks: The Return	Laura Palmer / Carrie Page	3 episodes
2019	Correspondence	Mona (voice)	4 episodes
2019	Limetown	Alison Haddock	2 episodes
2020	JJ Villard's Fairy Tales	Doreen (voice)	Episode: "Boypunzel"

=== Video games ===
Year	Title	Voice role
1994	Murder Mystery 3: Who Killed Brett Penance?	Lucie Fairwell
1994	Murder Mystery 4: Who Killed Taylor French?	Lucie Fairwell
2010	BioShock 2	Gossiping Baby Jane Splicer

=== Music videos ===
Year	Performer	Music video	Role
1994	The Backbeat Band	Money (That's What I Want)	Herself / Astrid Kirchherr
1994	The Backbeat Band	Please Mr. Postman	Herself / Astrid Kirchherr
1994	American Music Club	Can You Help Me	Woman

== Stage credits ==
Year	Title	Role	Theatre / Venue	Ref.
c. 1982	The Bad Seed	Mom	Fairview High School	
c. 1982	The Haunting of Hill House		Fairview High School	
1986	Crimes of the Heart		National Theatre Conservatory	
1988	Electric River		Pioneer Square Theater	
1989	Emerald City		Empty Space Theatre	
1991	Love Letters	Melissa Gardner	Canon Theater	
1992	Salome	Salome	Circle in the Square Theatre	
2019	Love Letters	Melissa Gardner	Kenan Auditorium	

== Audiobook ==
Year	Title	Notes	Ref.
2017	The Secret Diary of Laura Palmer	Narrator	

== Awards and recognition ==
List of acting awards and nominations
Year	Film / Title	Award	Category	Result	Ref.
1992	Twin Peaks	Soap Opera Digest Awards	Best Death Scene: Prime Time	Nominated	
1993	Twin Peaks: Fire Walk with Me	8th Independent Spirit Awards	Best Female Lead	Nominated	
1993	Twin Peaks: Fire Walk with Me	19th Saturn Awards	Best Actress	Nominated	
1995	Body of Work	Sundance Film Festival	Spirit of Sundance Award	Honored	
1999	Vampires	25th Saturn Awards	Best Supporting Actress	Nominated	
1999	Vampires	Fangoria Chainsaw Awards	Best Supporting Actress	Won	
2004	Kingpin	Prism Awards	Performance in a TV Movie or Miniseries	Nominated	
2010	Winter's Bone	Detroit Film Critics Society	Best Ensemble	Won	
2010	Winter's Bone	Gotham Independent Film Awards 2010	Best Ensemble	Won	
2010	Winter's Bone	Southeastern Film Critics Association	Best Ensemble	Runner-up	
2010	Winter's Bone	San Diego Film Critics Society	Best Ensemble Performance	Nominated	
2011	Winter's Bone	Alliance of Women Film Journalists	Best Ensemble Cast	Nominated	
2018	The Secret Diary of Laura Palmer	Audie Award	Best Female Narrator	Nominated	
