= Twin Peaks books =

Books based on the television series Twin Peaks

The cult classic television series Twin Peaks has spawned several successful books and audio books due to its popularity. In 1990 and 1991, Pocket Books released three official tie-in books, each authored by the show's creators (or their family) which offer a wealth of backstory. More official tie-in books would be released in 2016 and 2017, written by Mark Frost.

== Official releases ==
There are six novels based on Twin Peaks which have been released in book and/or audio book format and are written by authors involved with the series. These books are intended to be canon to the franchise and expand upon the storylines portrayed in the series and film; they do contain some continuity errors and contradictions, however—some of which may be intentional.

Title	Author(s)	Released	ISBN
The Secret Diary of Laura Palmer	Jennifer Lynch	September 15, 1990	ISBN 978-0-671-73590-6
The Secret Diary of Laura Palmer is the first spin-off novel based on the television series Twin Peaks. The book was written by Jennifer Lynch (daughter of series co-creator David Lynch) and was published between the airing of the first and second season. The fictional diary is "As seen by Jennifer Lynch", and written in a matter-of-fact tone from the point of view of Laura Palmer: a small-town teenager—a "good girl gone bad"—who is abused and terrorized by the demonic entity BOB. The book begins on Laura's 12th birthday in 1984, and steadily matures in writing style and vocabulary. It recounts standard teenage concerns of her first period, her first kiss, and her relationship with her parents, alongside experiences of sexual abuse, promiscuity, cocaine addiction, and her obsession with death. Laura's poetry foreshadows her murder. Her slow realisation of BOB's identity is described, although pages are "missing" from the end of the diary, which ends with an undated entry in late 1989, leaving the reader unable to reach a firm conclusion. Lynch said that "the careful reader will know the clues and who the killer is." The book reached number four on The New York Times paperback fiction best seller list in October 1990.
"Diane..." The Twin Peaks Tapes of Agent Cooper	Scott Frost	October 1, 1990	ISBN 978-0-671-73573-9
"Diane..." The Twin Peaks Tapes of Agent Cooper is an audio-only release written by Scott Frost (and interspersed with clips from the series). Originally released on cassette by Simon & Schuster Audio, the tape consists of newly recorded Cooper messages to his never-seen assistant, Diane, mixed in with monologues from the original broadcasts. The tape begins with a prologue monologue in which Cooper discusses his impending trip to Twin Peaks, continues with the initial monologue heard in the pilot, and continues to a point after his recovery from being shot. Kyle MacLachlan was nominated for a Grammy Award for best spoken-word performance for his work on the tape.
The Autobiography of F.B.I. Special Agent Dale Cooper: My Life, My Tapes	Scott Frost	May 1, 1991	ISBN 978-0-330-27280-3
The Autobiography of F.B.I. Special Agent Dale Cooper: My Life, My Tapes is the second spin-off novel based on Twin Peaks. It was written by Scott Frost (brother of series co-creator Mark Frost) and consists of a collection of transcripts from Agent Dale Cooper's audio tapes. The book begins with Cooper's childhood, including his upbringing in Philadelphia, family, and eventually education at Quaker institutions Germantown Friends School and Haverford College. It also explains his first stumbles with love, obsession with the FBI, and the relationship between him, Windom Earle, and Earle's wife, Caroline. The book ultimately concludes with the day he is assigned to Laura Palmer's murder. Many of these tape transcripts are dictated to "Diane", though a later tape states that Cooper enjoys the thought of Diane listening to his tapes so much that he will address all tapes to her whether she'll hear them all or not.
Welcome to Twin Peaks: An Access Guide to the Town	David Lynch, Mark Frost, Richard Saul Wurman	June 1, 1991	ISBN 978-0-671-74399-4
Twin Peaks: An Access Guide to the Town is the third spin-off novel based on Twin Peaks. The book is a parody of a traveler's guide book, as published by the "Twin Peaks Chamber of Commerce", and is illustrated with photographs, line drawings, and color maps. Inside, fans can find anything from a history of the Native Americans around the area, to the history of the Packard Sawmill, to a list of specials at the Double-R Diner. A character synopses is also included in the guide.
The Secret History of Twin Peaks	Mark Frost	October 18, 2016	ISBN 978-1-250-07558-1
A dossier-style novel written by series co-creator Mark Frost, "places the unexplained phenomena that unfolded in Twin Peaks in a layered, wide-ranging history, beginning with the journals of Lewis and Clark and ending with the shocking events that closed the finale." Structured as a secret dossier. Assembled by a mysterious “archivist” and annotated by FBI agent Tammy Preston, known throughout the book as TP, this enigmatic collection includes undiscovered Lewis and Clark diary entries, UFO sightings, and personal journals of Twin Peaks residents, some of which answer unresolved plotlines from the show's second season. Released October 18, 2016 on Audio & Book format.
Twin Peaks: The Final Dossier	Mark Frost	October 31, 2017	ISBN 978-1-250-16330-1
A follow-up to The Secret History of Twin Peaks, titled The Final Dossier and written by Mark Frost. The novel fills in details of the 25 years between the second and third seasons, and expands on some of the mysteries raised in the new episodes.

== Unofficial releases ==
Below is a partial list of books relating to Twin Peaks by authors not involved with the franchise. These are not considered canon or part of the franchise.

- Twin Peaks Behind-the-scenes: An Unofficial Visitors Guide to Twin Peaks (ISBN 978-1-556-98284-2), 1991. Written by Mark Altman.
- Welcome To Twin Peaks (ISBN 978-0-451-17031-6), 1990. Written by Scott Knickelbine. A Complete Guide to Who's Who and What's What. This book was unauthorized and was later pulled from the shelves.
- A Twin Peaks Interpretation (ISBN 978-0-227-17674-0), 1992. Written by Patricia Shook. "A 90's person's view of the Twin Peaks television series".
- Full of Secrets: Critical Approaches to Twin Peaks (ISBN 978-0-814-32506-3), 1995. Edited by David Lavery. "Full of Secrets" contains a collection of essays considering David Lynch's politics, the musical score, and the show's cult status, treatment of family violence, obsession with doubling, and silencing of women. Also included are a director and writer list, a cast list, a "Twin Peaks" calendar, a complete scene breakdown for the entire series, and a comprehensive bibliography. Essays include: "Lynching Women: A Feminist Reading of Twin Peaks", "Family Romance, Family Violence, and the Fantastic in Twin Peaks", "Infinite Games: The Derationalization of Detection in Twin Peaks", "Desire Under the Douglas Firs: Entering the Body of Reality in Twin Peaks", "The Canonization of Laura Palmer".
- Reflections: An Oral History of Twin Peaks (ISBN 978-0-61596-883-4), 2014. Written by Brad Dukes. "Reflections: An Oral History of Twin Peaks examines David Lynch and Mark Frost’s legendary television series that aired on the ABC network from 1990-91. As the mystery of “Who Killed Laura Palmer?” played out on television sets across the world, another compelling drama was unfolding in the everyday lives of the show’s cast and crew. Twenty-five years later, Reflections goes behind the curtain of Twin Peaks and documents the series’ unlikely beginnings, widespread success, and peculiar collapse. Featuring first-hand accounts from series cocreator Mark Frost and cast members including Kyle MacLachlan, Joan Chen, Sherilyn Fenn, Piper Laurie, Michael Ontkean, Ray Wise, Billy Zane, and many more – Reflections explores the magic and mystique of a true television phenomenon, Twin Peaks."
- Wrapped in Plastic: Twin Peaks (ISBN 978-1-77041-210-1), 2015. Written by Andy Burns. In Wrapped in Plastic, pop culture writer Andy Burns uncovers and explores the groundbreaking stylistic and storytelling methods that have made the series one of the most influential and enduring shows of the past 25 years. Andy Burns is the founder and editor-in-chief of the pop culture website Biff Bam Pop. In 2014, he interviewed various Twin Peaks alumni for both his book and the cover story to the March issue of Rue Morgue magazine, including Sheryl Lee, Ray Wise, Kimmy Robertson, James Marshall, Dana Ashbrook, Harley Peyton, Robert Engles, Jennifer Lynch, Ian Buchanan, and Michael J Anderson.
- TV Peaks: Twin Peaks and Modern Television Drama (ISBN 978-87-7674-906-4), 2015. Written by Andreas Halskov. "TV Peaks" is a TV historical book that explores the last 25 years of American and Scandinavian television. "TV Peaks" argues that Twin Peaks was a game changer, pointing to a more transgressive, genre-bending and serialized type of TV drama, but the book also explores structural, industrial, systemic and sociological factors. Based on interviews with numerous TV scholars, fans and cast and crew members (e.g. David Lynch, Angelo Badalamenti, Lesli Linka Glatter, Caleb Deschanel, Duwayne Dunham, Frank Byers, Dana Ashbrook, Sherilyn Fenn, Richard Beymer and Jonathan P. Shaw), "TV Peaks" investigates the recent changes in television, and it combines fandom studies, textual analysis and television history.
- Twin Peaks FAQ: All That's Left to Know About a Place Both Wonderful and Strange (ISBN 978-1-4950-1586-1), 2016. Written by David Bushman and Arthur Smith. Paley Center for Media curators David Bushman and Arthur Smith guide longtime fans and the newly initiated through the labyrinthian world of the television series and the theatrical film Fire Walk with Me, delving deep into the rich mythology that made Twin Peaks a cultural phenomenon. The book features detailed episode guides, character breakdowns, and explorations of the show's distinctive music, fashion, and locations.
- The Essential Wrapped In Plastic: Pathways to Twin Peaks (ISBN 978-0-9971081-0-1), 2016. Written by John Thorne. The Essential Wrapped In Plastic: Pathways to Twin Peaks collects many of the important essays and interviews from Wrapped In Plastic magazine, which, for thirteen years, studied Twin Peaks and its follow-up feature film, Fire Walk With Me. The book examines each episode of Twin Peaks; it provides analysis of original scripts, and observations from cast and crew (including comments from series co-creators David Lynch and Mark Frost, and cast members such as Sheryl Lee, James Marshall, Dana Ashbrook, Catherine Coulson, Miguel Ferrer, Frank Silva, Don Davis, Jack Nance, Everett McGill, Heather Graham, Michael J Anderson and many more.) In depth essays and commentary about Fire Walk With Me are also included.
- Angelo Badalamenti's Soundtrack from Twin Peaks (ISBN 978-1-501-32301-0), 2017. Written by Clare Nina Norelli. Part of Bloomsbury's 33 1/3 series, this book explores through musical analysis how Angelo Badalamenti's score works in tandem the show's visuals and details the collaborative partnership between Badalamenti and David Lynch.
- Laura's Ghost: Women Speak about Twin Peaks (ISBN 978-1-949-02408-1), 2020. Written by Courtenay Stallings. Laura's Ghost contains interviews with and essays from female fans of the show and women involved in its production including Sheryl Lee, Grace Zabriskie, and Jennifer Lynch. It examines the role of Laura Palmer in pop culture and her lasting impact on fans of the show.
- The Tao of Twin Peaks: The Meaning Behind David Lynch's Hit TV Series (ISBN 979-8-998-67150-0), 2025. Written by William Dickerson. Examines the symbology of the entire Twin Peaks canon, including Fire Walk with Me, with a particular focus on Twin Peaks: The Return. Dickerson also explores the show’s cinematic techniques, its cultural references, and its mythological, psychological, and religious influences.
- A Place Both Wonderful and Strange: The Extraordinary Untold History of Twin Peaks (ISBN 979-8-894-14039-1), 2026. Written by Scott Meslow. A comprehensive behind-the-scenes look at the productions of Twin Peaks, Twin Peaks: Fire Walk with Me, and Twin Peaks: The Return, as well as a variety of official spin-off projects and other interesting pieces of Twin Peaks ephemera.

== See also ==
- List of television series made into books
