= The Arcanum (novel) =

2005 novel by Thomas Wheeler

- Cover of The Arcanum
- Author: Thomas Wheeler
- Language: English
- Published: 2005 (Bantam Books)

The Arcanum is a 2005 novel by Thomas Wheeler. Set in 1919 it concerns the last case of occult-busters Sir Arthur Conan Doyle, Harry Houdini, H. P. Lovecraft, and voodoo queen Marie Laveau.

== Origins ==
Thomas Wheeler intended to write a novel about the Spiritualist Movement featuring a world of séances and shadows. The lead character was to embody the essence of the times, who would have the physical attributes of Houdini, the sleuthing skills of Sir Arthur Conan Doyle, the creepy intellect of H. P. Lovecraft, and the otherworldly skill-set of a Marie Laveau. Eventually Wheeler decided to use the original personages, and create a new character, the enigmatic leader of the Arcanum — Konstantin Duvall. Wheeler's brother suggested a vital element of the tale with the question: "Why can't it be their last adventure?"

== Plot summary ==
The year is 1919 and Sir Arthur Conan Doyle must investigate the murder of his mentor (and founder of The Arcanum), Konstantin Duvall. To do so he must reunite the scattered members of the Arcanum: Harry Houdini, H. P. Lovecraft, and voodoo queen Marie Laveau. Doyle finds himself embroiled in a story of war as old as time itself, for possession of the world's most powerful—now missing—artifact: the Book of Enoch, the chronicle of God's mistakes, within whose pages lie the seeds for the end of everything. Peopled with the twentieth century's most famous—and infamous—figures, the stakes go beyond the realm of humankind—into the divine.

== Characters ==
=== Konstantin Duvall ===
Duvall was a mage and a mystic, an explorer and collector of all things occult, and leader of the Arcanum. Also an advisor to presidents and czars. He kept many secrets, one of which, The Book of Enoch, the third part of the Bible that was thought to be erased from existence in the first century, was stolen from its hiding place by a practitioner of the dark arts.

"He was the last of the great mystics, a remnant of the Middle Ages. He bore the likeness and courage of a Templar Knight, yet embraced the pervisions of an Inquisitor priest. He was as burnt-fingered and secretive as an alchemist, yet spoke dozens of languages, wrote manuscripts in cipher, and traveled the world with different identities, in the tradition of a court spy."

=== Sir Arthur Conan Doyle ===
Possessing the observational and deductive powers of his fictional creation, Sherlock Holmes, Doyle has served Queen and Country under the tutelage of Konstantin Duvall. As a member of the Arcanum, Doyle has been involved in many occult mysteries and was unhappy when the group disbanded.

=== Harry Houdini ===
Houdini has moved on from his time with the Arcanum and is now a world-famous escape artist. He is currently making movies that highlight his escape skills and would prefer to forget all about his past occult exploits.

=== H. P. Lovecraft ===
He was the Arcanum's youngest member, and is a leading authority on all matters of the occult. He was deeply hurt when the Arcanum disbanded and seems constantly on the verge of a nervous breakdown.

=== Marie Laveau ===
The voodoo queen of the group, no one is sure of what powers she really has, but she claims to have been born in the 18th century. Doyle and Houdini suspect she is actually a descendant of the original Marie Laveau.

== Adventures of the Arcanum ==
A number of previous adventures of the Arcanum are mentioned throughout the novel, including;

- The 1903 cattle mutilations in Cheltenham blamed on George Edalji
- The 1905 discovery of the proof of mermaids in Madagascar
- The discovery and exorcism of the skull of "Bluebeard"
- The exploration of alien cities hidden in the Arctic
- The investigation of murders in Arkham, relating to a witch cult, caused by Thorton DeMarcus
- The Boston exorcism, caused by Thorton DeMarcus
- The summoning of the Jinn, caused by Thorton DeMarcus
- A case involving the scroll of Nyarlathotep, caused by Thorton DeMarcus

== The Hall of Relics ==
The Hall of Relics is part of Konstantin Duvall's secret annex located in the British Museum. It holds a range of items displayed on pedestals protected by globes of Venetian glass. The relics on display include;

- The remains of a mermaid, possibly of Atlantean descendancy (whose discovery Doyle was involved in).
- The Emerald Tablet of Hermes Trismegistus
- The cursed skull of "Bluebeard" Giles De Laval (Doyle led the investigation of its discovery)
- The Robes of St. Francis of Assisi
- The Spear of Destiny
- The Book of Enoch

== Doyle's leather bag ==
When Doyle was an active member of the Arcanum, he carried a leather satchel with some tools that were useful in his adventures, including;

- Evidence collection kit: small paper bags, evidence tags, string, paper coin envelopes, small vials and numerous glass containers, dental casting materials and equipment, tweezers, scissors, rubber gloves, pencils, and a tape measure.
- Medical supplies: forceps, a scalpel set, gauze bandages, a clinical thermometer, a vial of alcohol, hypodermic syringes, and a hand saw.
- Other items: a heavy leather sap, brass knuckles, and a crumpled deerstalker cap.

== See also ==
- The List of Seven by Mark Frost
- The Six Messiahs by Mark Frost
- Necronauts by Gordon Rennie and Frazer Irving which also teams Doyle, Houdini and Lovecraft

== Movie adaption ==
In November 2007, it was announced that Randall Wallace will be directing a movie version of The Arcanum from a script penned by Thomas Wheeler. Paul Brooks’ Gold Circle is producing with Scott Niemeyer and Norm Waitt on board as executive producers. Mandate Pictures will handle international sales.
