= The Tragedy of Macbeth (soundtrack) =

The Tragedy of Macbeth (Soundtrack from the Apple Original Film)

Film score by Carter Burwell
- Released: December 24, 2021
- Recorded: 2021
- Genre: Film score
- Length: 30:27
- Label: Milan
- Producer: Carter Burwell

Carter Burwell chronology
The Good Liar (2019)	The Tragedy of Macbeth (Soundtrack from the Apple Original Film) (2021)	Catherine Called Birdy (2022)

The Tragedy of Macbeth (Soundtrack from the Apple Original Film) is the soundtrack to the 2021 film The Tragedy of Macbeth, directed by Joel Coen in his first sole directorial outing, starring Denzel Washington. The film's orchestral score accompanied the 14-track soundtrack which was composed by Carter Burwell and also featured dialogues spoken by Washington, Frances McDormand, Kathryn Hunter amongst others. Milan Records released the film's soundtrack digitally on December 24, 2021, and physically on January 14, 2022.

== Development ==
In June 2020, it was announced that Carter Burwell would score music for The Tragedy of Macbeth, after associating in all of Coen brothers' films except Inside Llewyn Davis (2013). William Shakespeare's play Macbeth had minimal or mostly nullified music and the adapted script by Joel also followed the suit. Burwell received the script, also admitted that the film is dense with dialogue where "there wasn't a lot of space just for music", which reaffirmed when he received a part of the footage shot before production haled due to COVID-19 pandemic, and complimented Joel's decision to film it entirety in sound stages to bring the ambience and also being untethered from reality.

"We settled on this idea that the dialogue is often really the melody and that the score is the accompaniment to that. So by viewing it that way and having the music in a whole set of octaves where it doesn't interfere with the human voice, that helped just as a concept."

— Carter Burwell

In order to ensure that the score should not drown out the text, he employed the cello and bass in the lowest two octaves as they were guided by the rhythm of the play, adding "Joel had written right into the script this sense of rhythm, of beats that he achieves by drips of water or blood or even hallucinations on the part of Lady Macbeth when she hears things beating in the castle [...] We spent a lot of time figuring out how to integrate that with the music." Most of the score being integrated with the action of the sequences and dialogues, that combined with the musical landscape of cello and bass. A solo fiddle also accompanied sparsely where it goes off pitch.

Recording of the string instruments and orchestral elements was proven to be challenging with restrictions imposed during the COVID-19 pandemic. He was inspired by Bernard Herrmann's score for Psycho (1960) and thought on string players could wear masks allowing the recording process to be smoothly processed. The string sounds evoke the feel of a "black-and-white horror film" where the basses do biting attacks, and the cellos do bouncy vibratos. He wanted to develop a love theme for Macbeth and Lady Macbeth but refrained it as it would distract the film's disturbing tone.

== Critical reception ==
A. O. Scott of The New York Times wrote "The strings of Carter Burwell's score sometimes sound like birds of prey, and literal crows disrupt the somber, boxy frames with bursts of nightmarish cacophony." Odie Henderson of RogerEbert.com called it as a "great, brooding musical score". David Rooney of The Hollywood Reporter praised the "gut-churning sound design and powerful use of Carter Burwell's suspenseful score, full of thundering percussion and insidious strings." Justin Chang, in his review for National Public Radio, said "Carter Burwell's score sets an ominous mood, complemented by what sounds like an executioner's drumbeats."

== Track listing ==
The Tragedy of Macbeth (Soundtrack from the Apple Original Film) track listing
No.	Title	Artist(s)	Length
1.	"Fair Is Foul"	Kathryn Hunter	1:50
2.	"My Black Desires"		1:19
3.	"Come What Come May"	Denzel Washington	3:03
4.	"Leave All the Rest to Me"	Washington; Frances McDormand	2:52
5.	"Blood Will Have Blood"		1:45
6.	"Is This a Dagger?"	Washington	2:08
7.	"Something Wicked This Way Comes"		3:25
8.	"Be Not Found Here"		1:34
9.	"Out Damned Spot"	McDormand; Nancy Daly; Jefferson Mays	3:47
10.	"Birnam Wood"		2:35
11.	"Come Seeling Night"		1:21
12.	"Tomorrow and Tomorrow"	Washington	1:20
13.	"The End of Macbeth"		3:28
Total length:			30:27

== Accolades ==
Accolades for The Tragedy of Macbeth (Soundtrack from the Apple Original Film)
Award	Date of ceremony	Category	Recipient(s)	Result	Ref.
Hollywood Music in Media Awards	November 17, 2021	Best Original Score in an Independent Film	Carter Burwell	Nominated	
St. Louis Gateway Film Critics Association Awards	December 19, 2021	Best Score	Carter Burwell	Nominated	
