= Missing Link (soundtrack) =

Missing Link (Original Motion Picture Soundtrack)

Soundtrack album by Carter Burwell
- Released: April 12, 2019
- Recorded: 2018–19
- Studio: Abbey Road Studios
- Genre: Film score
- Length: 53:07
- Label: Lakeshore Records

Carter Burwell chronology
The Ballad of Buster Scruggs (2018)	Missing Link (2019)	The Good Liar (2019)

Missing Link (Original Motion Picture Soundtrack) is the soundtrack to the 2019 film of the same name. Featuring an original score composed by Carter Burwell, the album was published and released by Lakeshore Records on April 12, 2019, through digital providers while Mondo released its vinyl LP edition on the same date. Preceding the album, was the original song "Do-Dilly-Do" written and performed by Walter Martin, which released on March 21, 2019 as its lead single.

== Development ==
"Generally I work on mostly live-action films. I wait until there's an edit of a film, they give it to me, and I start thinking about what's appropriate and start working on it. But in this case, it's different because it takes so many years to make a film with this process, that I would get, like, a scene or just a bit of a character; things like that. And I had to begin when they were really just pencil drawings [...] But the cool thing is I got to watch the film develop over the course of years. A new cut would come in, and I'd say, 'Wow, I had no idea the background was going to be like that.' It was pretty interesting."

— Carter Burwell

The musical score is produced by Carter Burwell, in his third animated feature after A Goofy Movie (1995) and Anomalisa (2015). Burwell recalled that he studied animation course in college, and also worked as an animator, though he seldom contributed music for animation films; speaking to Charles Steinberg of Under the Radar, Burwell explained that "animated films so often have a very distinct point of view because they have to choose how to represent their world. They have to make all these choices that live action films don't have to make. They are working from the ground up and have a strong point of view because of that". While stop-motion animation had been basically created on a table top, Laika wanted it to get off and create a film which was "sweeping in its action and panoramic in the visuals" and the music is insisted to emulate the same, while he would "push the humanity of these characters and to push the scale of the adventure and amplify both of those".

Unlike Burwell's approach for darker, disturbing and philosophical material, and "more of a tense mix of psychological experiences", the score for Missing Link consists of a brighter side, which was challenging for Burwell. It ranged from various emotions, from "perilous to light-heartedness" and not being whimsical as the soundtrack for several animation films. The music was fairly emotional which Butler demanded, and also referenced the 1956 film Around the World in 80 Days; he had the theme from the film in mind while writing the film. Burwell admitted that "he liked the idea of going back to that travelog action-adventure that's also a comedy and has romance" while demanding a strong melody and distinctive instrumentation that would capture the different locations that the characters were visiting in the story, such as the Pacific Northwest, the American War Southwest, India, or the Himalayas.

He was previously associated with Indian and East Asian music, when he was a member of Harmonic Choir where they would use several traditions from other world, and Burwell would take raga lessons with Indian singer, Shiva Dar. He used some of the Indian instruments, such as the tanpura to create the pedal tone familiar in Indian music, and also have drone against all other melodic activity takes place. For the sitar, he had no clue on how easily the notes translated to Western notation while writing, but when recording it at Abbey Road Studios in London, he roped several skilled sitar players to record them. Burwell added that "[Indian] Raaga is typically an improvised form of music. There's a mode of raaga, as they call it, and they improvise melodies within that, but of course, that's not going to work so well in a film where you have to follow second by second and frame by frame what's going on. So, I'm not sure how they do it in Bollywood [Laughs] but it was very easy in London for the sitar player to work off the notation of mine and work off the track I created to bond the action in the film." Burwell also used Jew's harp to exhibit Mongolian music, as "the Jew's harp by nature only plays one note, but in Mongolia – and they do this with the voices too – The melody is between the harmonics of that one note. It results in these odd timbres and I went to town a little in that scene and explored that for comedic purposes."

Burwell wanted the sound of a large orchestra over 80 to 90 players, but without large room for enough players, he settled for 40 players recording at the second block in Abbey Road Studios. He first recorded the strings and woodwinds in one pass using 40 players, then brought in 12 brass players to overdub it, and percussion to overlay the brass. All the score has been recorded separately, as if he had recorded it altogether, he would accompany more strings and woodwinds to balance the brass section. He employed over 56 musicians to get the sound of how 80 players in an orchestra performed.

== Track listing ==
All music is composed by Carter Burwell, except as noted.

No.	Title	Length
1.	"Missing Link"	1:24
2.	"Lionel vs Nessie"	1:49
3.	"A Letter"	2:32
4.	"Dark Days"	0:55
5.	"Westward Ho"	2:15
6.	"Forest Primeval"	1:29
7.	"What Do I Call You?"	0:58
8.	"Bar Brawl"	2:42
9.	"Breaking and Entering"	2:08
10.	"More Than Acquaintances"	0:44
11.	"Terrible Thieves"	0:23
12.	"Stenk At the Station"	1:19
13.	"Stagecoach"	3:16
14.	"Susan"	2:34
15.	"Thunderclouds"	0:33
16.	"Stormy Waters"	2:58
17.	"Passage To India"	0:56
18.	"The Himalayas"	1:06
19.	"Don't Mention the Chicken"	0:47
20.	"Dinner With Gamu"	1:21
21.	"Climbing"	1:00
22.	"Big Foot Prints"	1:28
23.	"Shangri-La"	1:27
24.	"Myth Made Real"	2:10
25.	"The Inescapable Pit"	0:59
26.	"Prove It"	1:26
27.	"Escape Plan"	0:56
28.	"No One Will Remember Your Name"	2:36
29.	"Ice Fight"	3:24
30.	"My Own Adventure"	0:58
31.	"The Fiji Mermaid"	1:10
32.	"Do-Dilly-Do (A Friend Like You)" (performed by Walter Martin)	3:13
Total length:		53:07

== Reception ==
Deadline Hollywood's Pete Hammond, J. Don Birnam of Splash Report, and David Ehrlich of IndieWire complimented the score as "sparkling", "lavish" and "exuberant".
