= Three Billboards Outside Ebbing, Missouri (soundtrack) =

2017 film soundtrack album

Three Billboards Outside Ebbing, Missouri (Original Motion Picture Soundtrack)

Soundtrack album by various artists
- Released: November 10, 2017
- Studios: Abbey Road Studios, London
- Genres: Folk; Americana
- Length: 44:06
- Label: Varèse Sarabande

Carter Burwell chronology
Wonderstruck (2017)	Three Billboards Outside Ebbing, Missouri (2017)	The Ballad of Buster Scruggs (2018)

Three Billboards Outside Ebbing, Missouri (Original Motion Picture Soundtrack) is the soundtrack album to the 2017 film Three Billboards Outside Ebbing, Missouri directed by Martin McDonagh, starring Sam Rockwell, Frances McDormand and Woody Harrelson. The original score is composed by Carter Burwell and the soundtrack featured most of his scores, along with folk and Americana songs featuring contributions by ABBA, Joan Baez, The Felice Brothers, the Four Tops, Monsters of Folk and Townes Van Zandt. The album was released through Varèse Sarabande on November 10, 2017. Burwell received nominations for an Academy Award and Golden Globe award for his work on the film.

== Background and development ==
McDonagh provided the script to Burwell prior to the film's shooting. As Burwell found the scoring process to be complex because of the constantly changing interpersonal dynamics between the characters, Burwell asked McDonagh on what the film was really about, to which McDonagh said it was about a woman who is at war with the police. Though it did not help that initially, this decision took lead in a helpful direction as Mildred changed her outfit as she was on the warpath. Burwell then composed a war-march piece, using guitar, mandolin, and strings as a stomp-clamping rhythm, to describe Mildfred's violence and vengeance. But also needed other themes to sympathetically connect with Mildred as a character. McDonagh described it as Sergio Leone-type of score that provides the film a Western feel.

Hence the theme of "loss" was utilized to elicit sympathy for he situation and choices, following the rape and murder of her daughter. Burwell used a nylon string guitar, piano, clarinet and other string instruments for an intimate sounding. Another main theme was the "death" which progresses "as the story and the relationships develop, the themes intertwine until, by the last couple of reels, they're barely recognizable". Burwell considered the film to be "very funny and very violent, and death is one of the things that drives all the characters towards their violence and their funny activities".

But as the narrative that switches between Mildred, Dixon and sheriff Willoughby, Burwell considered to provide each character having a distinctive musical signature, an approach used by Ennio Morricone for his spaghetti western scores. But since the process became too arched, Burwell decided to focus on Midred and then focusing on Dixon, using "Loss" as a shared theme. Burwell added that, "Dixon's been burned to a crisp, basically, while he's reading a letter from his mentor [Willoughby], and the advice he gives him in this letter leads him off in a different direction. So the music begins to play sympathetically for him and he now begins to align musically with Mildred".

== Release ==
Varèse Sarabande released the film's soundtrack on November 10, 2017, coinciding the film's release.

== Reception ==
Marcy Donelson of AllMusic wrote "It's not one of Burwell's more ambitious scores, but it's one of his most organic – in terms of sound, but even more so in its symbiosis with the film." James Southall of Movie Wave wrote "It's short, though – half of the 44-minute album is taken up by songs, dotted throughout the score. Program them out and you get a really nice, very colourful and evocative little score which is completely, unmistakably Carter Burwell." Jonathan Broxton of Movie Wave wrote "Tonally, Three Billboards Outside Ebbing Missouri shares commonalities with scores like Storyville from 1992, This Boy's Life from 1993, The Chamber from 1996, The Hi-Lo Country from 1998, the quieter parts of The Alamo, and maybe True Grit, and anyone who appreciated his work on those scores may find this one also to their liking. However, what I appreciate about it the most is the way Burwell has crafted a perfect musical portrait of the central dichotomy inherent in Mildred: crippling grief overcome with raw aggression, antagonism, and an innate desire for justice at any cost."

David Rooney of The Hollywood Reporter wrote "More than the visuals, the depth of the movie owes much to Carter Burwell's flavorful, distinctly American score, with its roots and folk elements, and to superb song choices." Glenn Kenny of RogerEbert.com stated that "Carter Burwell's Morricone-inflected score is a treat". Sandy Schaefer of Screen Rant wrote "Much like he did on In Bruges, composer Carter Burwell further enhances the mood of Three Billboards with his beautiful score, blending rural tunes with more classical and poetic leitmotifs." Steve Pond of TheWrap stated that "Carter Burwell's score and by the judicious use of evocative songs" aided the film.

== Track listing ==
No.	Title	Writer(s)	Length
1.	"Mildred Goes to War"		1:22
2.	"The Deer"		2:06
3.	"Buckskin Stallion Blues" (performed by Townes Van Zandt)	Townes Van Zandt	2:59
4.	"A Cough of Blood, A Dark Drive"		2:37
5.	"I've Been Arrested"		0:38
6.	"Fruit Loops"		1:29
7.	"Chiquitita"	ABBA	0:40
8.	"His Master's Voice" (performed by Monsters of Folk)	Jim James; Conor Oberst; M. Ward; Mike Mogis	4:49
9.	"Billboards On Fire"		2:24
10.	"Slippers"		1:19
11.	"The Last Rose of Summer" (performed by Renee Fleming and Jeffrey Tate)	Words: Thomas Moore; Music: Friedrich von Flotow	4:51
12.	"My Dear Anne"		2:35
13.	"Walk Away Renée" (performed by The Four Tops)	Michael Brown; Bob Calilli; Tony Sansone	2:44
14.	"Billboards Are Back"		1:24
15.	"Collecting Samples"		1:15
16.	"Sorry Welby"		1:43
17.	"The Night They Drove Old Dixie Down" (performed by Joan Baez)	Robbie Robertson	3:23
18.	"Countermove"		1:56
19.	"Can't Give Up Hope"		0:30
20.	"Buckskin Stallion Blues" (performed by Amy Annelle)	Townes Van Zandt	3:21

== Complete score ==
A complete score album was released by 20th Century Fox Film Corporation as a part of the "For Your Consideration" campaign to garner industry validation during the 2017–18 film awards season.

No.	Title	Length
1.	"Mildred Goes To War"
2.	"Angela Hayes' Mother"
3.	"Easter Dinner"
4.	"A War On Our Hands"
5.	"Croak"
6.	"Charred Grass"
7.	"Mildred In Custody"
8.	"A Cough Of Blood, A Dark Drive"
9.	"A Dead Kid's Room"
10.	"Fruit Loops"
11.	"I've Been Arrested"
12.	"Deer"
13.	"Ski Mask"
14.	"My Dear Anne"
15.	"Welcome To Missouri"
16.	"Countermove"
17.	"Billboards On Fire"
18.	"Slippers"
19.	"Sorry Welby"
20.	"Billboards Are Back"
21.	"Collecting Samples"
22.	"Can't Give Up Hope"

== Personnel ==
Credits adapted from liner notes:

- Music composer, conductor and orchestrator – Carter Burwell
- Assistant orchestra conductor – Susie Gillis
- Orchestra contractor – Isobel Griffiths
- Orchestra leader – Everton Nelson
- Recording and mixing – Michael Farrow
- Recording supervisor – Karen Elliott
- Mastering – Patricia Sullivan
- Score editor – John Warhurst
- Musical assistance – Dean Parker
- Music coordinator – Chris Piccaro
- Copyist – Vic Fraser
- Executive producer – James Gibb, Robert Townson
- Bass – Chris Lawrence
- Clarinet – Nick Carpenter
- Guitar – Hugh Burns
- Mandolin – Adam Goldsmith
- Percussion – Paul Clarvis
- Piano – Dave Hartley

== Chart performance ==
Chart (2017–2018)	Peak position
UK Soundtrack Albums (OCC)	38
US Top Soundtracks (Billboard)	18

== Accolades ==
Award	Date of ceremony	Category	Nominee(s)	Result	Ref(s)
Academy Awards	March 4, 2018	Best Original Score	Carter Burwell	Nominated	
British Independent Film Awards	December 10, 2017	Best Music	Carter Burwell	Won	
Florida Film Critics Circle	December 23, 2017	Best Score	Carter Burwell	Nominated	
Golden Globe Awards	January 7, 2018	Best Original Score	Carter Burwell	Nominated	
St. Louis Film Critics Association	December 17, 2017	Best Soundtrack	Three Billboards Outside Ebbing, Missouri	Runner-up	
Washington D.C. Area Film Critics Association	December 8, 2017	Best Original Score	Carter Burwell	Nominated	
World Soundtrack Awards	October 17, 2018	Soundtrack Composer of the Year	Carter Burwell (Note: also for Goodbye Christopher Robin)	Won	
