= Acting on Impulse =

1993 American film by Sam Irvin

- theatrical poster
- Directed by: Sam Irvin
- Screenplay by: Mark Pittman; Alan Moskowitz
- Story by: Solomon Weingarten
- Produced by: Michael Jaffe; Mark Benton Johnson; David Peters
- Starring: C. Thomas Howell; Linda Fiorentino; Nancy Allen
- Cinematography: Dean Lent
- Edited by: Neil Grieve
- Music by: Daniel Licht-+2
- Production company: Spectacor Films
- Distributed by: Showtime Networks; Academy Home Entertainment
- Release date: June 3, 1993
- Running time: 93 minutes
- Country: United States
- Language: English

Acting on Impulse is a 1993 American black comedy crime thriller film directed by Sam Irvin and starring C. Thomas Howell, Linda Fiorentino, and Nancy Allen. Also known under the alternate titles Secret Lives and Eyes of a Stranger, it premiered at the Seattle International Film Festival on June 3, 1993, before being broadcast by Showtime on July 10, 1993. Adam Ant, Paul Bartel, Isaac Hayes, Charles Lane, Don Most, Zelda Rubinstein, Kim McGuire, and Dick Sargent (in his last role) make cameo appearances.

== Cast ==
- C. Thomas Howell as Paul Stevens
- Linda Fiorentino as Susan Gittes
- Nancy Allen as Cathy Thomas
- Judith Hoag as Gail Black
- Tom Wright as Dave Byers
- Adam Ant as Eric Boggs
- Paul Bartel as Bruno
- Patrick Bauchau as Yoram Sussman
- Isaac Hayes as Detective Stubbs
- Don Most as Leroy
- Peter Lupus as Steven Smith
- Kim McGuire as Bambi
- Miles O'Keeffe as John
- Cassandra Peterson as Roxy
- Zelda Rubinstein as Nosy Lady
- Nicholas Sadler as Tommy
- Dick Sargent as Mr. Randolph
- Brinke Stevens as Waitress
- Michael Talbott as Melvin
- Mary Woronov as Receptionist
- Bob Golub as Harley (credited as Robert Alan Golub)
- Craig Shoemaker as Jeff
- Gary Bowers as The Bartender (uncredited)

== Critical response ==
The Kansas City Star called Acting on Impulse "perverse fun", while Entertainment Weekly noted it as a "goofball [thriller]", at once "relaxed and fraught with sexual tension".
