= Wonderstruck (soundtrack) =

2017 film soundtrack album

Wonderstruck (Original Motion Picture Soundtrack)

Film score by Carter Burwell
- Released: October 20, 2017
- Recorded: 2017
- Studios: Abbey Road Studios, London
- Genre: Film score
- Length: 59:35 (standard); 63:20 (special)
- Label: Lakeshore
- Producer: Carter Burwell

Carter Burwell chronology
Goodbye Christopher Robin (2017)	Wonderstruck (2017)	Three Billboards Outside Ebbing, Missouri (2017)

Wonderstruck (Original Motion Picture Soundtrack) is the film score to the 2017 film Wonderstruck directed by Todd Haynes and starring Oakes Fegley, Julianne Moore, Michelle Williams and Millicent Simmonds. The original score is composed by Carter Burwell and recorded at the Abbey Road Studios in London. The album was released through Varèse Sarabande on October 20, 2017.

== Development ==
In August 2016, it was announced that Carter Burwell would compose the score for Wonderstruck; Burwell had previously scored Haynes' Velvet Goldmine (1998), Mildred Pierce (2011) and Carol (2015), the latter earned him an Academy Award nomination for Best Original Score. Since the film focused on two parallel stories—the deaf runaway Rose in 1927 and the deaf boy Ben in 1977—the film emphasized more on music, which resulted in Wonderstruck being Burwell's biggest film scoring achievement to date. Burwell said that he had wrote 80 minutes of music, much more than he had written for films.

Burwell stated that much of the black and white sequences had wall to wall music, an established musical style in the cinema of 1940s and 1950s and went through numerous permutations and combinations of how to write more music without overwhelming the audience as a trial and error approach. Burwell wrote the music based on the rough cut of the film, developing a thematic motif for the young characters which should not be overly complex in terms of melody but to be played across numerous situations where the characters undergo a wide range of emotional spectrum. To achieve this, Burwell focused on the melody being consistent while the setting changes, which lead to utilize various instruments like oboe, clarinet and violin to play the melody or the harmonies around the melody changing to make the sound more major and minor, where Burwell invert the shape of the melody or let the instruments echo each other. Burwell had to create various through orchestration due to more music accompanied in the film, without any breaks.

To accompany Rose's scenes, a lilting melody was created for the character. Added that "She's a very take charge person so her melody reflects this sense of optimism and energy". Burwell noticed this on Rose's arrival to Manhattan where the camera focused to magazines, hoovers and stockings and then shifts focus to the skyscrapers, as per Rose's perspective, which provided a shift in scale that had to be carried musically. Hence that sequence is scored with a harmonica and violin and the music grows further to match the visuals. For Ben's storyline, Burwell took a different approach, he added: "Ben has just become deaf when he leaves home and travels to New York so I wanted to convey confusion". Hence, much of the music had been muffled or either the lows being filtered so the audience might hear more of the highs. Burwell further had instruments slide from note to note to make it more woozy and get across Ben's sense of disorientation.

After watching the rough cut, Burwell sketched musical ideas at his home in Long Island and after completing the score, Burwell then recorded it at the Abbey Road Studios in London, for a week, conducting a 38-piece orchestra that comprises eight violins, four violas, three cellos, two basses, a piano and an assortment of "single wind" instruments such as flute, clarinet, oboe and bassoon, and a "slew of percussion" as the percussive instruments were not sentimental by nature, as the story in itself was emotional and he and Haynes collectively decided to avoid overwhelmingly sentimentalizing the kids' situations.

== Release ==
The score was released through Lakeshore Records in both standard and special editions on October 20, 2017.

== Track listing ==
Standard edition
No.	Title	Length
1.	"Silent Whispers"	1:33
2.	"Talking Pictures"	1:02
3.	"Daughter of the Storm"	0:46
4.	"Coming to Ground"	2:28
5.	"Serious Trouble"	2:10
6.	"Runaways"	4:03
7.	"Ride to Hell's Kitchen"	1:56
8.	"Little Girl, Big City"	2:15
9.	"A Helping Hand"	1:06
10.	"Ben Robbed"	0:54
11.	"My Mother's Advice"	1:46
12.	"Lillian in the Light"	1:10
13.	"Lillian in the Flesh"	2:03
14.	"The Museum Beckons"	3:47
15.	"Dioramas"	1:55
16.	"The Meteorite"	3:12
17.	"Wolves"	1:23
18.	"Museum Pursuits"	2:34
19.	"Secret Place"	3:08
20.	"Rose in the Cabinet of Wonders"	2:37
21.	"Closed to the Public"	0:49
22.	"Home with Walter"	0:28
23.	"Ben?"	3:00
24.	"The Unisphere"	2:01
25.	"The Panorama"	0:53
26.	"The Story of Rose"	3:21
27.	"Mementos"	4:25
28.	"The City and the Stars"	2:50
Total length:		59:35

Special edition
No.	Title	Length
1.	"Death Recalled"	1:15
2.	"Silent Whispers"	1:33
3.	"Talking Pictures"	1:02
4.	"Daughter of the Storm"	0:46
5.	"Lightning Storm"	0:35
6.	"Coming to Ground"	2:28
7.	"Serious Trouble"	2:10
8.	"Runaways"	4:03
9.	"Ride to Hell's Kitchen"	1:56
10.	"Little Girl, Big City"	2:15
11.	"A Helping Hand"	1:06
12.	"Ben Robbed"	0:54
13.	"My Mother's Advice"	1:46
14.	"Lillian in the Light"	1:10
15.	"Lillian in the Flesh"	2:03
16.	"The Museum Beckons"	3:47
17.	"Dioramas"	1:55
18.	"The Meteorite"	3:12
19.	"Wolves"	1:23
20.	"Museum Pursuits"	2:34
21.	"Secret Place"	3:08
22.	"Rose in the Cabinet of Wonders"	2:37
23.	"Closed to the Public"	0:49
24.	"To the Pictures"	0:28
25.	"Home with Walter"	1:55
26.	"Ben?"	3:00
27.	"The Unisphere"	2:01
28.	"The Panorama"	0:53
29.	"The Story of Rose"	3:21
30.	"Mementos"	4:25
31.	"The City and the Stars"	2:50
Total length:		63:20

== Reception ==
Sophie Monks Kaufman of Sight and Sound wrote "Carter Burwell's delicate swell of a score engulf[es] the images. His music binds the two timelines, lending emotional continuity". Christy Lemire of RogerEbert.com wrote "the boldly percussive score from frequent Coen brothers composer Carter Burwell punctuates particular moments in dramatic, unsettling ways." Wendy Ide of The Observer noted that Burwell's score carried the film. David Rooney of The Hollywood Reporter wrote "Perhaps even more notable here is the work of composer Carter Burwell, who has created distinct musical moods for the narrative's parallel threads, following the adventures of two runaway deaf kids 50 years apart, with the sounds subtly folded together as their stories intersect." Emily Yoshida of Vulture added that "the score by the otherwise brilliant Carter Burwell is affected by the whiplash".

Richard Lawson of Vanity Fair wrote "Carter Burwell's utterly captivating, wholly necessary score. It's the true star of Wonderstruck, a strange and varied piece of work, swells of orchestral strings giving way to electric guitar, alternately soaring and lilting. Haynes heavily, and smartly, relies on the music to take us to grand emotional places, and the film is at its best when it lets itself be swept up in the majesty and mystery of Burwell's compositions. These are the moments when one sincerely feels struck by an enveloping wonder—how marvelous, that light and sound can still transport us so—before the film grows sticky and dismayingly uninspiring once more. It's perhaps a cruel irony that a movie about deafness is most ennobled by what we hear..." Peter Travers of Rolling Stone wrote "The longing of two lost children metaphorically connecting across time is extremely moving, and ably abetted by Carter Burwell's graceful score."

Bilge Ebiri of Miami New Times wrote "Wonderstruck plays like a city symphony; the kids' silent movements are accompanied by Carter Burwell's dominant score, bouncing from elegant orchestrations to funk fuzz to melodic drones." Michael Phillips of Chicago Tribune wrote "Composer Carter Burwell's score, plaintive and vivid without bigfooting the action, adds a great deal." Justin Chang of Los Angeles Times wrote "Much of Wonderstruck plays like a silent film, with Carter Burwell's lilting, surging score filling in the occasional long pauses between audible dialogue." Alex Welch of IGN wrote "if there is one MVP in the Wonderstruck creative team, it's composer Carter Burwell. Already an accomplished film veteran, Burwell has created a score for the ages here, one that moves through all of the film's multiple sequences and time periods with graceful fluidity. The film's silent sequences are reliant on the crucial work of Burwell, and fortunately for everyone involved, he's met those challenges with his best score to date."

== Personnel ==
Credits adapted from Burwell's website:

- Music composer, producer, conductor and orchestrator – Carter Burwell
- Orchestra contractor – Isobel Griffiths
- Assistant orchestra contractor – Amy Stewart, Susie Gillis
- Orchestra leader – Everton Nelson
- Recording – Michael Farrow, John Barrett
- Mixing – Michael Farrow
- Mastering – Stephen Marsh
- Score editor – Todd Kasow
- Copyist – Vic Fraser
- Musical assistance – Dean Parker
- Executive producer – Brian McNelis, Brian Selznick, Christine Vachon, David Serlin, John Sloss, Randall Poster, Skip Williamson, Todd Haynes
- A&R – Eric Craig
- Art direction – John Bergin

Instruments

- Bass – Chris Laurence
- Bassoon – Stephen Maw
- Cello – Tim Gill
- Clarinet – Nick Carpenter
- Electric bass – Percy Jones
- Electric guitar – David Torn
- Flute – Eliza Marshall
- Harp – Hugh Webb
- Oboe – Chris Cowie
- Percussion – Evelyn Glennie, Frank Ricotti, Paul Clarvis
- Piano – Dave Hartley
- Timpani – Bill Lockhart
- Viola – Bruce White
- Violin – Steve Morris

== Accolades ==
Awards	Date of ceremony	Category	Recipient(s)	Result	Ref.
Hollywood Music in Media Awards	November 16, 2017	Best Original Score – Feature Film	Carter Burwell	Nominated	
International Cinephile Society	February 4, 2018	Best Original Score	Carter Burwell	Nominated	
Satellite Awards	February 11, 2018	Best Original Score	Carter Burwell	Nominated	
Saturn Awards	June 27, 2018	Best Music	Carter Burwell	Nominated	
Seattle Film Critics Society	December 18, 2017	Best Original Score	Carter Burwell	Nominated	
