= The Paladin Prophecy =

2012 book by Mark Frost

- First edition cover
- Author: Mark Frost
- Audio read by: Nick Chamian
- Genre: Young adult; Science fiction
- Publisher: Random House
- Publication date: September 25, 2012
- ISBN: 978-0-375-87045-3

The Paladin Prophecy is the first book in the young adult fiction series of the same name by American author Mark Frost. It was released in September 2012. An audiobook narrated by Nick Chamian was also released in September 2012.

== Synopsis ==
Will West has always lived by a code set by his father, Jordan West, a series of rules to help him survive. He's always lived under the radar to never attract any unwanted attention, even to the point of slowing down while running cross country. But one day on his morning run he encounters a group of mysterious dangerous looking men in black caps driving black sedans and he discovers how fast he can really run.

He meets a woman named Lillian Robbins and she tells him he scored extraordinarily well on a national assessment and offers him a full scholarship to a secret elite private school. After school he notices that his mom, Belinda, is not herself. Men in black caps invade his house and he runs into monsters from another dimension, only able to escape with the help of a mysterious man named Dave. He discovers a video message from his father and runs away with the help of Nando, a taxi driver, and flies to the school in Wisconsin that Lillian Robbins works at. He and his new roommates; Brooke, Ajay, Nick, and Elise discover a mysterious group of people that call themselves "The Peers".

Dave tells Will he must fight against a group of creatures who want to invade the earth and destroy humanity. These monsters live in the Never-Was, an alternate dimension where they are imprisoned. Dave is a protector whose objective is to keep Will alive to eventually defeat the Never-Was and its inhabitants. Together they discover that the Peers are really a school group called the Knights of Charlemagne.

While Brooke is trying to help gather information about them for Will, she is kidnapped and held hostage. With the help of Nick, Ajay, and Elise, Will is able to save her and uncover the secret plan off the 'Knights'. 'The Peers' leader, Lyle Ogilvy, while attempting to kill Will, gets hit by a wendigo, a creature from the Never-was, and loses his soul. While defending Will from the wendigo, Dave gets sucked into the Never-Was.

They all end up in the medical center and after questioning by Principal Rourke and Ms. Robbins, Will goes with them to see the site where his parents crashed in an airplane. He meets 'Mr. Hobbes', the evil mastermind behind the Knights of Charlemagne. During discussion with his roommates, they believe that they may have all been test tube babies who were genetically altered while still an embryo.

At the end, Will receives a message from his father, who he now knows is really Hugh Greenwood, and discovers he is still alive.

Trilogy:

1. 1: Paladin Prophecy
2. 2: Alliance
3. 3: Rogue
