= The Ballad of Buster Scruggs (soundtrack) =

2018 film soundtrack album

The Ballad of Buster Scruggs (Original Motion Picture Soundtrack)

Soundtrack album by Carter Burwell
- Released: November 9, 2018
- Studio: Abbey Road Studios, London; Sear Sound, New York City; The Body, New York City
- Genre: Film score; film soundtrack
- Length: 42:55
- Label: Milan
- Producer: Carter Burwell

Chris Bacon chronology
Three Billboards Outside Ebbing, Missouri (2017)	The Ballad of Buster Scruggs (2018)	Missing Link (2019)

The Ballad of Buster Scruggs (Original Motion Picture Soundtrack) is the soundtrack album to the 2018 film The Ballad of Buster Scruggs directed by the Coen brothers. The film score is composed by Carter Burwell, a frequent collaborator of the duo, featuring songs and musical score. The album released through Milan Records on November 9, 2018.

== Development ==
"Sometimes the music plays the hopes and dreams, and sometimes it plays the bleakness of the situation [...] Each [story] is very different, but music would be the thing that would tie them all together."

— Carter Burwell

In October 2017, it was reported that Carter Burwell, a frequent collaborator of the Coen brothers, would score The Ballad of Buster Scruggs. As the film consisted of six different anthologies, Burwell treated them as different films, with respect to the tone and story, but "the big question was, to what extent do we try to weave a thread through it that gives it some unity." He recalled that Joel told the single thread of the film being a non-accidental death. Burwell could not find a musical solution that would work for all of them and needed an array of strong emotional colors to work with.

As a result, Burwell decided to utilize the Cowboy song "Streets of Laredo" and use guitars, harmonica and tack piano throughout the score. However, Burwell needed "a big, traditional Western sound" for four of the six segments, that needed a "Dimitri Tiomkin sense of scale" for the segment All Gold Canyon and The Gal Who Got Rattled. He further researched old cowboy songs, recorded in the early 20th century for the Library of Congress, which were "generally lonely and sad songs" but refrained from writing new music inspired by them, and focused on the "folkier aspects of the orchestra" without relying too far on the classical Western territory.

The score was recorded with an orchestra at the Abbey Road Studios in London and Sear Sound in New York City and mixed and mastered at Burwell's The Body, New York City. He added "In this case, Netflix as a distributor is not a signatory to any of the union agreements here. So they wanted to go to London so they wouldn't be involved in that. I mention that because more and more films are being made by companies that aren't signatories. It's an issue."

== Release ==
In October 2018, it was announced that Milan Records would distribute the album, and the track list was unveiled the following month which featured songs performed by Brendan Gleeson and Tim Blake Nelson. A musical piece from the album, "Seeking Alice" was released on October 26, 2018, while "Canyon Awake" released through IndieWire on November 7. The soundtrack was released digitally on November 9, followed by a physical release via CDs on November 30 and a vinyl LP unveiled later on December 21.

== Track listing ==
All tracks are written by Carter Burwell, except where noted.

No.	Title	Writer(s)	Artist(s)	Length
1.	"The Book"			1:48
2.	"Cool Water" (produced by T Bone Burnett)	Bob Nolan	Tim Blake Nelson	1:43
3.	"Carefree Drifter" (produced by David Rawlings)	David Rawlings; Gillian Welch	David Rawlings; Gillian Welch	0:49
4.	"Randall Collins" (written by Norman Blake)	Norman Blake		1:18
5.	"Near Algodones"			1:56
6.	"The Wingless Thrush"			2:30
7.	"Our Revels"			2:20
8.	"When a Cowboy Trades His Spurs for Wings" (produced by David Rawlings)	David Rawlings; Gillian Welch	Willie Watson; Tim Blake Nelson	2:34
9.	"Canyon Awake"			1:54
10.	"How Deep"			2:11
11.	"Hello, Mr. Pocket!"			2:17
12.	"Your Share"			1:11
13.	"Little Joe the Wrangler (Surly Joe)" (produced by T Bone Burnett)	Frank Loesser; Friedrich Hollaender; Joel Coen; Ethan Coen	Tim Blake Nelson	1:29
14.	"Goodbye Canyon"			1:28
15.	"Unmarked Grave"			1:27
16.	"Wagon Train"			1:02
17.	"Certainty"			1:42
18.	"The Oregon Trail"			1:18
19.	"Seeking Alice"			2:18
20.	"The Gal Who Got Rattled"			1:28
21.	"The Unfortunate Lad"		Brendan Gleeson	1:44
22.	"The Mortal Remains"			2:41
23.	"The End of Buster Scruggs"			3:47
Total length:				42:55

== Reception ==
David Edelstein of Vulture wrote "Carter Burwell's score is perhaps his most achingly beautiful." Peter Bradshaw of The Guardian and Glenn Kenny of RogerEbert.com called the score as "richly plausible" and "gorgeous". Will Hodgkinson of The Times wrote "Carter Burwell's soundtrack for [The Ballad of Buster Scruggs] proves evocative enough to stand up on its own." Tim Grierson of Screen International wrote "composer Carter Burwell delivers another of his superb Coen scores — actually, several of them, as his music moves from plaintive to menacing, depending on the story." Todd McCarthy of The Hollywood Reporter wrote "Carter Burwell's wonderfully resourceful score is abetted by no end of Western tunes that have been neatly worked into the flow of events."

== Accolades ==
Award	Date of ceremony	Category	Recipient(s)	Result	Ref(s)
Hollywood Music in Media Awards	November 14, 2018	Best Original Score – Feature Film	Carter Burwell	Nominated	
Golden Reel Awards	February 18, 2019	Outstanding Achievement in Sound Editing – Feature Underscore	Todd Kasaw (music editor)	Nominated	
Academy Awards	February 24, 2019	Best Original Song	"When a Cowboy Trades His Spurs for Wings" by David Rawlings and Gillian Welch	Nominated	
St. Louis Film Critics Association Awards	December 16, 2018	Best Music Score	Carter Burwell	Nominated	
World Soundtrack Awards	October 18, 2019	Best Original Song Written Directly for a Film	"When a Cowboy Trades His Spurs for Wings" by David Rawlings and Gillian Welch	Nominated	

== Release history ==
Region	Date	Format(s)	Label	Ref.
Various	November 9, 2018	Digital download; streaming	Milan	
Various	November 30, 2018	CD	Milan	
Various	December 21, 2018	Vinyl	Milan	
