= Disturbed (film) =

1990 American horror film

- Directed by: Charles Winkler
- Written by: Emerson Bixby; Charles Winkler
- Produced by: Patricia Foulkrod; Brad Wyman
- Starring: Malcolm McDowell; Geoffrey Lewis; Priscilla Pointer; Kim McGuire
- Cinematography: Bernd Heinl
- Edited by: David Handman
- Music by: Steven Scott Smalley
- Distributed by: Second Generation Films
- Release date: November 16, 1990
- Running time: 94 minutes
- Country: United States
- Language: English

Disturbed is a 1990 American horror film directed by Charles Winkler starring Malcolm McDowell as a psychiatrist who rapes a young woman in his care, then must deal with her vengeance-seeking daughter 10 years later. Pamela Gidley had a supporting role in the film.

== Plot ==
Dr. Derrick Russell (Malcolm McDowell) rapes one of the patients in his care. When the patient throws herself from the roof shortly afterward, he describes her suicide as a consequence of her depression. Ten years later, he plans to rape another patient, Sandy Ramirez (Pamela Gidley). What Russell does not know is that Sandy is the daughter of his previous victim, and she is bent on revenge. A post-credits scene shows Dr. Russell in a padded room kissing the camera and then laughing.

== Cast ==
- Malcolm McDowell as Dr. Derrick Russell
- Geoffrey Lewis as Michael Kahn
- Priscilla Pointer as Nurse Francine
- Pamela Gidley as Sandy Ramirez
- Irwin Keyes as Pat Tuel
- Clint Howard as Brian
- Peter Murnik as Brad
- Adam Rifkin as Gary
- Kim McGuire as Selina
- Deep Roy as Marty
- Kim McGuire as Selina
- Dean Cameron as Singing Telegram Man
