= Kim McGuire =

American actor and lawyer

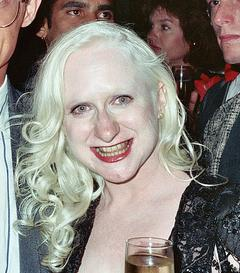
- McGuire at the APLA benefit, September 7, 1990
- Born: Kim Diane McGuire; December 1, 1955; New Orleans, Louisiana, U.S.
- Died: September 14, 2016 (aged 60); Naples, Florida, U.S.
- Occupations: Actress; attorney; author
- Years active: 1989–1994
- Spouse: Gene Piotrowsky (m?-2016)

Kim Diane McGuire (December 1, 1955 – September 14, 2016) was an American actress, lawyer and author. She was best known for her role of Mona "Hatchet-Face" Malnorowski in John Waters' 1990 comedy musical Cry-Baby.

== Early life ==
Kim Diane McGuire was born in New Orleans, Louisiana, to attorney Raymond A. McGuire and his wife, the former Mary Toole. She initially intended to follow in her father's footsteps, and, after taking undergraduate studies at the University of New Orleans, completed her education at the Loyola University School of Law.

However, McGuire also became interested in performing from an early age; following her casting in the film Cry-Baby, she stated that "This has been my dream since I was 3. I started off as a dancer and said I wanted to make myself as triple-threat as possible, and do Chekhov and Shakespeare... I just think it's so magical. I hate to say it, but I've always wanted to be a star."

== Film and TV career ==
=== Cry-Baby and its aftermath ===
In early 1985, John Waters announced that he was working on a script for a new film entitled Hatchet-Face, which was "about a woman and her multilevel beauty problems". Although this film was never realized, a similar character of the same name was subsequently incorporated into the project that became Cry-Baby. It has been posited that Malnorowski, a grotesque, loud-mouthed member of the teenage delinquent gang headed by Johnny Depp's Wade "Cry-Baby" Walker, had originally been conceived by John Waters with Divine in mind. The drag queen, who had been a distinctive presence in Waters' films for almost two decades, died in March 1988, before production of Cry-Baby began.

When Waters came to cast the role of Hatchetface in March 1989, the character was described thus: "She's got the body of Jayne Mansfield and the face of Margaret Hamilton... [and] nobody, but nobody, gives her grief." To find a suitable actress, Waters placed a print advertisement that simply requested: "Wanted: Girl with a good body and an alarming face who is proud of it". Prospective candidates were invited to send a recent photograph to "Cry-Baby Productions, 222 St. Paul Pl., Baltimore, MD, 21201."

McGuire, then working on stage in New York City, saw the advertisement and was reportedly hired by Waters "almost immediately" after her audition. In a 2005 documentary about the film, titled It Came From Baltimore, McGuire recalled:

I had just randomly sent my picture to six casting directors that week. I sent it to [casting director] Paula Herold, who was casting for a film called Reversal of Fortune, which I had no idea what it was about. And I guess I had a reversal of fortune, because they called me in for Cry-Baby.

For the movie, McGuire's naturally unusual physiognomy was greatly exaggerated through grotesque make-up so that she resembled (as one critic later put it) "a Cubist poster-child." The transformation was incredible; later, Waters stated: "that face that she wears in the movie is certainly make-up; Kim has a very blank face in real life". McGuire herself once quipped, "When people see me after seeing that, they think I look really good."

After principal production of Cry-Baby was completed in July 1989, a series of test screenings was held during which McGuire's performance as Hatchetface was so well-received that Waters decided to insert some additional sequences involving the character. An additional fortnight of shooting took place in November, after which two new Hatchetface scenes found their way into the final cut.

Writing in New York Magazine, David Denby noted the presence of "a startlingly ugly baby tramp, Hatchetface, played, with makeup spread all over her face, by the masochistically courageous Kim McGuire." Another observer wrote of McGuire, "whose screwed-up face is an object of much bad-taste-flouting hilarity." Other critics were no less descriptive, and variously described her as "a hideously contorted floozy" (New York Times), "gorgeously grotesque" (Newsweek), "a character with a mug like silly putty with eyes" (The Advocate), and "a sort of junior Margaret Hamilton" (Atlanta Journal Constitution).

The Boston Globe reported that "Divine's kind of generous outrageousness comes from Kim McGuire as a tough-talking tough-looking character called Hatchet Face". Another critic stated that "Divine's rubber-faced antics find a new home in the actress Kim McGuire's Hatchet Face", while yet another simply noted that "the closest thing to an old-time Waters' face is Mona 'Hatchet Face' Malnorowski, as played, with twisted face, by someone named Kim McGuire". Waters himself described McGuire as "a definite starlet on the rise" and, in another interview, wistfully stated that "she should have been in Dick Tracy". For many months after the release of Cry-Baby, McGuire remained a prominent feature on the Hollywood social circuit, being photographed at film premieres (including Postcards from the Edge and David Lynch's Wild at Heart), parties, benefits and other A-list events.

=== Later film and TV appearances ===
In February 1990, when Cry-Baby was first screened for its cast and crew, McGuire was already working on her next film, Charles Winkler's horror flick Disturbed, starring Malcolm McDowell as a psychotic doctor. Soon afterwards, and without even having yet acquired an agent, McGuire signed to appear opposite James Caan in Rob Reiner's film adaptation of Stephen King's novel, Misery. However, her lead role as the psychopathic nurse Annie Wilkes was subsequently taken by Kathy Bates, who went on to win the Academy Award for Best Actress for her performance.

Nevertheless, McGuire continued to work in films over the next few years, with appearances in a TV movie, Acting on Impulse (1993); and an uncredited cameo in John Waters' next project, Serial Mom (1994). Her unusual appearance was also put to memorable use in two off-beat television series, each featuring odd characters in quirky scenarios: the HBO series Dream On (1990) and David Lynch's short-lived On the Air (1992), which was cancelled after only three episodes.

Like Cry-Baby, the latter series was set in the 1950s; McGuire played the role of Nicole Thorne, a "shrewish publicist" to a television executive. Notwithstanding the quirkiness of the series, she grasped the opportunity to break away from her Hatchetface image. In one interview, she said: "After [Cry-Baby], when I went on job interviews producers expected to see this big, ugly six-foot-tall actress whereas I'm just five feet high. This series, I hope, will make people forget me as Hatchetface." She added, "I always wanted to meet David Lynch, so I can't tell you how thrilled I am to be working on the show. And there are lots of other plusses. For example, it really feels great to show up groomed with my hair in place wearing decent clothes". In one episode, a magician performed a series of unconventional magic tricks, prompting one critic to describe the sequence as "a must-see, if only for the nightmarishly Fly-like image of Kim McGuire stepping out of a vanishing box with her head on the body of a skittering iguana."

== Life after Hollywood ==
By the mid-1990s, McGuire had all but given up on her film career. In December 1997, she was admitted to the California State Bar and began working as an attorney in Los Angeles, specializing in entertainment and appellate law. She and her husband, Emmy-winning television producer Gene Piotrowsky, were in New York at the time of the September 11 attacks and consequently found themselves unemployed. The couple moved to Biloxi, Mississippi, where, a few years earlier, McGuire's parents (still living in New Orleans) had purchased a seaside vacation house in the exclusive Holy Land district.

While McGuire thereafter concentrated on her career as an attorney, both she and her husband maintained an interest in the performing arts. In September 2002, they became members of a local theatre group, the Mississippi Repertory Theatre Company, McGuire in the capacity of legal counsel, and Piotrowsky as director of marketing and advertising.

McGuire's performance as Hatchetface in Cry-Baby was introduced to a new generation of fans when the film was released as a director's cut DVD in July 2005. She and several cast members (along with Johnny Depp, Amy Locane, Traci Lords, Ricki Lake, Darren E. Burrows and Stephen Mailer) reunited to film a short documentary special feature for the release. Waters commented on the reunion: "we found all the people today, including Hatchetface. I hadn't seen Hatchetface since we made the movie almost 20 years ago. She looked great, she looked like a regular middle-aged woman. But she looked very different to how she does in the movie, so it was kind of startling."

In September 2005, McGuire and Piotrowsky were rendered homeless by Hurricane Katrina; it was reported that "they lost everything except for Gene's Emmy, which was found broken amidst the rubble that was their home".

On the aftermath of the disaster, Piotrowsky told a reporter: "Though they plan and equip themselves for something like this, it's never enough. We ought to know: We lived in L.A. during the 1994 earthquake, we were visiting New York on 9/11, and now we lived through this. I told a friend about all of that and he said, 'Do me a favor and tell me where you're moving to next'." The couple was temporarily accommodated in a local grade school with 300 other hurricane survivors before transferring to more permanent accommodation in Mobile, Alabama.

By November 2005, McGuire had become temporarily licensed to practice law in Alabama, and subsequently resumed her career as an attorney, specializing in family law. She was admitted to the Alabama State Bar in September 2006, and re-admitted to the California State Bar in April 2010 after a period of professional inactivity in that state.

== Death ==
On September 13, 2016, McGuire was admitted to the ICU at Physicians Regional Hospital in Naples, Florida with pneumonia. After failing to respond to treatment, she suffered a cardiac arrest and died the following day.

== Filmography ==
Film
Year	Title	Role	Notes
1990	Cry-Baby	Mona "Hatchet-Face" Malnorowski	
1990	Disturbed	Selina	
1993	Acting on Impulse	Bambi	
1994	Serial Mom	Stage Diver	Uncredited

Television
Year	Title	Role	Notes
1990	Dream On	Punk Rocker	Episode: "Trojan War"
1992	On the Air	Nicole Thorne	Recurring (season 1)
1993	New York Undercover	Bambi	Episode: "Mama Said Knock You Out"
