= Scott Frost (writer) =

American novelist

Scott Frost is an American screenwriter and novelist. He is the son of actor Warren Frost and the brother of Mark Frost and actress Lindsay Frost. He worked with his brother and David Lynch on the Twin Peaks television series, writing two episodes. He wrote episode 1.4 of the little-seen On the Air television series for Lynch and his brother, although the episode was never aired in the United States. Among others, he has also written an episode of Babylon 5 entitled "The Long Dark", and two episodes of Andromeda. In the early 1990s, he wrote the script for the mystery/thriller TV movie Past Tense with Miguel Tejada-Flores. He again worked with his brother on the 2001 series All Souls.

== Novels ==
Frost's first novel, The Autobiography of FBI Agent Dale Cooper, was based on the Twin Peaks character played by Kyle MacLachlan.

More recently, he has written a mystery/thriller series based on a character named Alex Delillo, a Pasadena homicide detective and single mother. There are currently five novels in the series.

- Wait for Dark (2010)
- Don't Look Back (2009)
- Point of No Return (2007)
- Never Fear (2006)
- Run the Risk (2005)
