= Goodbye Christopher Robin (soundtrack) =

2017 film soundtrack album

Goodbye Christopher Robin (Original Motion Picture Soundtrack)

Film score by Carter Burwell
- Released: 13 October 2017
- Recorded: 2017
- Studios: Abbey Road Studios, London
- Genre: Film score
- Length: 60:56
- Label: Sony Classical
- Producer: Carter Burwell

Carter Burwell chronology
The Founder (2016)	Goodbye Christopher Robin (2017)	Wonderstruck (2017)

Goodbye Christopher Robin (Original Motion Picture Soundtrack) is the film score composed by Carter Burwell to the 2017 film Goodbye Christopher Robin directed by Simon Curtis starring Domhnall Gleeson and Margot Robbie. The original score was released through Sony Classical Records on 13 October 2017.

== Development ==
Carter Burwell composed the film score. Burwell considered the riskier decision of the film score was to withhold the main theme until the mid-portions of the film, when A. A. Milne begins to write and his friend Ernest Shepard begins to illustrate Winnie-the-Pooh, which they did to make that montage especially noteworthy, thereby being the turning point of the story. Before that point, the music illustrated various things like trauma, transition from city to country life, awkward relations between Christopher Robin and his parents until Winnie the Pooh changes everything. In terms of instrumentation, they did not focus on the period of the film but the instruments should match the 1920s and 1930s, thought particularly of the English pastoral tradition such as George Butterworth's "Two English Idylls".

A specific note Burwell received to solve problems musically, was one having to do with Christopher Robin's mother Daphne, where the American audiences did not emphatize with Daphne that resents the inconvenience of being a mother, and hence Burwell was asked to what he could do to make her more likable, but that provided him fewer opportunities to do so in the score, even though he did the best. Burwell, however considered, the real life relationship between Robin and Daphne was much worse than what shown on heard in this film.

== Release ==
The soundtrack was released through Sony Classical Records digitally on 13 October 2017, followed by a CD released on 27 October.

== Reception ==
Jonathan Broxton of Movie Music UK wrote "Goodbye Christopher Robin may not be the Winnie the Pooh score one was expecting, but it's certainly the one the film needed." Susan Wloszczyna of RogerEbert.com called it a "sweeping" score. Sheri Linden of The Hollywood Reporter wrote that "whether the onscreen action is obvious or subtle, Carter Burwell's elegant score is understatement personified." David Ehrlich of IndieWire called it a "characteristically lush score".

Mark Kermode of The Guardian wrote "Carter Burwell's score tinkles and surges, employing piano and harp to pluck mercilessly at the heartstrings". Peter Debruge of Variety and Jeannette Catsoulis of The New York Times called it a "honey-sweet" and "honeyed" score. "The score by Carter Burwell swells and surges, in preparation for the next 88-odd minutes of treacly over-statement". Jazz Tangcay of Awards Daily wrote "Carter Burwell's fine score is beautiful and enchanting throughout. His harp strings and orchestrations are a perpetual gift to cinema and in this film his score stirs a warm sensation of cozy nostalgia."

Anthony Aguilar of Set the Tape wrote "Carter Burwell's score for Goodbye Christopher Robin is strong and full of whimsy, pathos and stirring beauty. Performed largely by strings, harp, and piano, this score will appeal to those looking for something a little smaller scale than the normal big Hollywood sound. That's not to say that the score is always quiet, as fans of large scale dramatic scores will find moments to enjoy here as well. If you require bombast, sweeping scope, and large orchestras in your scores then steer clear. For everybody else, Carter Burwell has composed a real winner with his music for Goodbye Christopher Robin." Sandy Schaefer of Screen Rant wrote "setting the mood is the score by the Coen Brothers' frequent collaborator Carter Burwell, which embellishes the wondrous vibe of Alan and Christopher's time playing together in their own Hundred-Acre Wood, and nicely contrasts those scenes with the more dramatic somber moments of the film." Trevor Johnston of Radio Times called it a "string-laden score".

== Track listing ==
No.	Title	Artist(s)	Length
1.	"Tree of Memory"		4:01
2.	"Birth"		1:23
3.	"First Night"		2:09
4.	"Cotchford Farm"		1:54
5.	"The Object Of My Affection"	The Boswell Sisters with Jimmie Grier	3:21
6.	"Toys and Stars"		1:23
7.	"Into the Forest"		3:00
8.	"Bear Hunt"		1:58
9.	"Goes to Town in a Golden Gown"		1:06
10.	"To the Zoo"		1:55
11.	"Balloons"		0:50
12.	"Snowfall, Snowrise"		2:25
13.	"A Man and His Dream"	Al Bowlly	3:24
14.	"Drawing Pooh"		2:33
15.	"I'm Billy Moon, and I'll Be Back Soon"		1:57
16.	"When We Were Young"		0:47
17.	"The People a Person Loves"		1:38
18.	"Fame"		3:37
19.	"Tea with Christopher Robin"		3:24
20.	"Keep Your Memories"		3:27
21.	"Down the Stairs, Nobody Cares"		0:53
22.	"Not Another Word"		1:31
23.	"Private Milne"		1:19
24.	"Billy Leaves"		5:35
25.	"Well, if It Isn't Billy Moon"		3:14
26.	"Home, I Should Think"		2:12
Total length:			60:56

== Personnel ==
Credits adapted from liner notes:

- Music composer and producer – Carter Burwell
- Recording – Michael Farrow, John Barrett, Stefano Civetta
- Mixing – Michael Farrow
- Mastering – Bob Ludwig
- Music editor – Adam Milo Smalley
- Music supervisor – Sarah Bridge
- Musical assistance – Dean Parker
- Music librarian – Richard Ihnatowicz
- Copyist – Vic Fraser
- Liner notes – Simon Curtis
- Booklet editing and design – WLP Ltd.

Orchestra

- Orchestra conductor – Carter Burwell
- Orchestrators – Carter Burwell, Sonny Kompanek
- Orchestra leader – Everton Nelson, Perry Montague-Mason
- Orchestra contractor – Isobel Griffiths, Susie Gillis

Instruments

- Harp – Hugh Webb
- Piano – David Hartley

Management

- Music business affairs for Twentieth Century Fox – Tom Cavanaugh
- Music management for Twentieth Century Fox – Areli Quirarte
- Music clearance for Twentieth Century Fox – Ellen Ginsburg
- Executive in charge of music for Twentieth Century Fox – Danielle Diego
- Music production supervisor for Twentieth Century Fox – Rebecca Morellato
- Music supervisor for Twentieth Century Fox – Anton Monsted
- Soundtrack coordination for Twentieth Century Fox – JoAnn Orgel
- Sony Classical Records product development – Jennifer Liebeskind
- Sony Classical Records licensing – Mark Cavell

== Accolades ==
Award	Date of ceremony	Category	Nominee(s)	Result	Ref(s)
World Soundtrack Awards	October 17, 2018	Soundtrack Composer of the Year	Carter Burwell (Note: also for Three Billboards Outside Ebbing, Missouri)	Won	
