= The List of Seven =

1993 novel by Mark Frost

- Hardcover edition
- Author: Mark Frost
- Language: English
- Genre: Fiction
- Published: September 1, 1993
- Publisher: William Morrow
- Publication place: United States
- Media type: Print, e-book
- Pages: 368
- ISBN: 978-0688122454

The List of Seven is a 1993 novel by Mark Frost. Though initially an occult murder mystery, the story brings in conspiracy theory, vendetta, horror, history, and Theosophy. The main character, Sir Arthur Conan Doyle, is a real historical person (albeit engaging in fictional actions) and several other historical figures appear in the story. Mark Frost followed the book with a sequel in 1995, The Six Messiahs.

== Plot summary ==
Christmas Day 1884. Dr. Arthur Conan Doyle is invited to a seance where two people are apparently murdered. Doyle is saved by Armond Sacker, apparently a professor of Antiquities at Cambridge University. Doyle contacts Claude Leboux, a friend and Scotland Yard Inspector to investigate, but the house where the seance took place has been redecorated. Doyle gets a note from Helena Petrovna Blavatsky inviting him to a speech in Cambridge. He goes to Cambridge, unsuccessfully tries to track down Sacker, and then Doyle attends Blavatsky's talk, and speaks with her afterwards. She warns him of dark spirits and after a meal he is attacked and is rescued by "Professor Sacker" for a second time who turns out to be Jack Sparks, Special Agent to the Crown. They head to Topping to the estate of one of the attendees at the seance, but find that it has become a madhouse. They find a clue to go to a publishing house called Rathbourne & Sons in London. On the journey back to London, Jack reveals that his brother Alexander may be the mastermind behind all their troubles. Jack thinks the attacks on Doyle are prompted by a manuscript that Doyle submitted to Rathbourne & Sons. When they get to the publishing house they find a list of the board of directors - the titular “List of Seven”. A secret trapdoor leads them via an aqueduct to a storage room in the British Museum, which has had many statues stolen from it.

The next day they journey to Whitby to trace an acting troupe that may have been involved in staging the seance. There they meet Bram Stoker and an actress named Eileen, the last survivor of the doomed acting troupe. Stoker tells them that strange sights have been seen at the abandoned nunnery north of the town. They investigate, and witness an occult ceremony using the corpse of Sparks' father. Alexander Sparks confronts Doyle and Eileen and invites them to dinner, where they meet the rest of the Seven. Their plan is to take control of Prince Edward, Duke of Clarence, third in line to the throne, and use him to enslave the world by putting a demon in his future child. Doyle, Eileen and Jack fight with the Seven and with the help of a regiment of Royal Marines and Household Cavalry, they defeat the Seven.

Jack disappears to continue the hunt for Alexander who has gotten away, while Doyle is granted an audience with Queen Victoria, who offers her thanks for his help. Doyle later learns that Jack and Alexander fought and fell over the Reichenbach Falls, with neither surviving. Doyle decides to commemorate Jack by creating a character in the image of his friend: Sherlock Holmes.

== Characters ==
=== Jonathan "Jack" Sparks ===
Jack Sparks was born in Yorkshire in 1847, his father was a diplomat to Egypt who retired so that both he and Jack's mother could participate in his upbringing. When he was 5 years old, Jack discovered that he had an older brother, Alexander, whom he had never heard of or met. After two years of pestering his parents, they finally agreed to allow Jack to meet Alexander at his boarding school, but only under close supervision. When the two brothers finally met Alexander devised a way that they could secretly communicate with each other by means of letters sent through proxies. Alexander appeared to be a very loving and nice brother who explained to Jack the exercises and routines by which he developed himself mentally and physically (somewhat similar to the Doc Savage Method Of Self-development).

In 1859, when Jack was 12 years old Alexander communicated with him that he had to find a way to get to Salzburg for the summer holidays so that they could meet up; to achieve this Jack practised his violin day and night until he became so good that he persuaded his parents to send him to Vienna to get some expert tutorship.

Alexander did not appear in Salzburg, but a month into Jack's visit he was called to the principal's office where he was told that his parents had been killed in a tragic house fire. When Jack returned home the priest who took his father's last confession explained that the fire was an accident, but under duress admitted the truth, that as Jack's father had died, he told the priest that Jack's mother and all the servants had been murdered by Alexander. Jack's father had given the priest a letter detailing the death of Jack's older sister, Madeline Rose, at the hands of Alexander. Jack decided to spend the rest of his life tracking down Alexander, and undoing some of the evil his brother had done. In the early 1860s Jack becomes invalided from cholera and entertained himself by reading voraciously, a habit he retained his whole lifetime.

After he left public school, Jack attended university, Cambridge - Caius and Magdalene - studying medicine and the natural sciences, and also briefly studied at Christ Church, Oxford taking Theology and amateur theatricals. He left university before graduation to continue his search for Alexander. Some time after this he performed on stage in America for 8 months as part of the Sasanoff Shakespearean Company, performing in many lead roles.

While following Alexander's trail Jack learned a great deal about mysticism and other profane knowledge. Jack also learned a lot about the use of various weapons, including the bolas. As well as his hunt for Alexander, Jack has spent his time reforming criminals, he is exceptionally skilled at disguises, he also has incredible observational and deductive skills.

In June 1884 Jack was arrested and placed in Bedlam Hospital under the orders of Sir Nigel Gull, who feared Jack's investigations were going to uncover the Seven. Jack was always kept straitjacketed, and was regularly injected with cocaine to keep him docile and dependant until he escaped after a month. He is still trying to get over the effects of the drugs through self-medication.

=== Arthur Conan Doyle ===
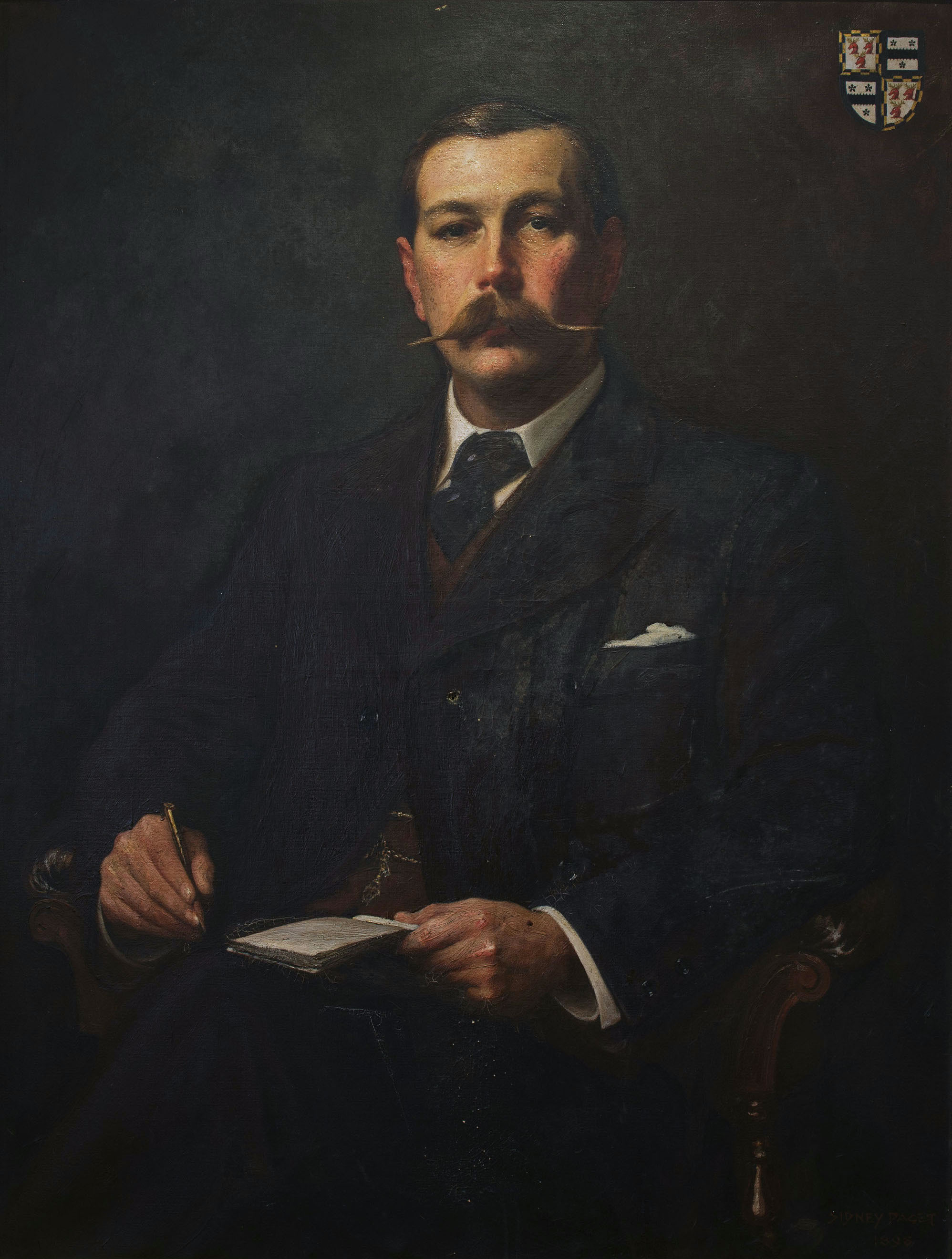
Portrait of Sir Arthur Conan Doyle by Sidney Paget, 1897

This story is set when Arthur Conan Doyle was just beginning his career as a writer, he is a young man (26 years old) whose medical practice is not very successful and is somewhat lacking in confidence. In the story Doyle submits a manuscript entitled "The Dark Brotherhood" which concerns a cabal of evil magicians which is too close to the truth for a certain group of individuals. Doyle has incredible observational and deductive abilities and is handy in a fight.

=== Larry and Barry ===
Larry and Barry are identical twin brothers whose mother, Louisa May, died in childbirth. Their father, a railroad man, spent a lot of time working and this resulted in Larry and Barry getting into all kinds of mischief, starting off as pickpockets and finally becoming burglars.

Since few people knew that they were twins, one brother would commit a burglary while the other brother was drawing attention to himself in a public setting (Barry would sing whereas Larry favoured the "epic recitation of the ribald lim'rick"), thus creating an alibi.

Barry got a scar which runs down the right side of his face from an encounter with a fishmonger who caught Barry trying to have relations with his daughter. The fishmonger attacked Barry with a meat cleaver. After this incident the brother grew beards to cover up the difference, and on their next job when Larry was robbing a house in Kensington, Jack Sparks burst in and took Larry's loot and asked him to reform. Four days later Barry was robbing a silversmith and Jack again stole their loot and asked them to reform. The brothers lay low for three weeks and finally when breaking into an antiques store in Portobello, Jack was waiting for them with a policeman, and offered them one more time to go straight or go to jail. The brothers decided to go straight, and become Jack's assistants (part of Jack's Regulars, as he calls them).

Larry talks a lot, whereas Barry is more the silent one. Larry is a better lockpick whereas Barry is better at scaling walls.

=== Alexander Sparks ===
Alexander Sparks is Jack's older brother, six years his senior. When Alexander was a child his father was still serving as a diplomat, and therefore he was the centre of his mother's world. When Alexander was five his mother had a second child, Madeline Rose, who Alexander became insanely jealous of, and killed. His mother caught a fleeting glimpse of him running away after committing the crime, which drove her slightly mad. He was sent to boarding school, and spend holidays overseas with distant relatives and only met his parents once a year over Easter weekend.

This suited Alexander a great deal, he had the opportunity to expand his sphere of influence, soon he gathered around him a loyal band of followers who undertook any of Alexander's orders without question. They were involved in animal torture, violent hazing of new schoolmates, and blood oaths. By the age of thirteen Alexander began breaking into homes to hone his stealth tactics and also violently raped several young women.

Upon graduation, he travelled from England to Paris, then south to Marseilles, and onto Cairo. There he murdered an Englishwoman who had been his father's mistress and an Egyptian Art dealer (and his family) who was haggling too much over buying stolen art. From there he went to the Middle East seeking entry into various mystery schools.

He returned to England in 1872 where he set himself up as the kingpin of criminal activity in England, and forged an alliance with the Dark Brotherhood to enslave the world.

=== Bram Stoker ===
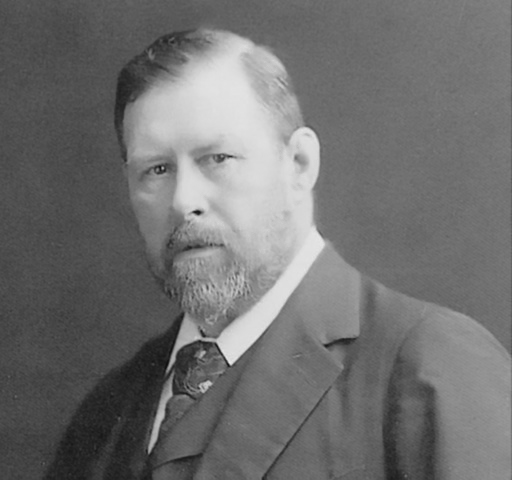
Photograph of Bram Stoker

Bram Stoker meets the gang in Whitby, he is there investigating rumours of an incident regarding members of the Manchester Players. It is clear how the master storyteller has been influenced by the events he witnesses to write his masterpiece Dracula.

=== Eileen Temple ===
Eileen Temple is an actress who has been with the Manchester Players for the past two years. She and three other players, including her fiancé, were hired for a very large sum of money to participate in a once-off performance of a seance which they were told was a practical joke. She portrayed Lady Caroline Nicholson. On the night of the performance, unexpected things happened, and her fiancé was killed. A few days later the other two performers from the players were found dead, so Eileen fled to Whitby.

== List of Seven ==
The list of seven is the list of the board of directors of Rathbourne & Sons Publishers—who also happen to be members of the Dark Brotherhood.

- Maximilian Graves / Alexander Sparks
- Sir Nigel Gull
- Lady Caroline Nicholson
- Professor Arminius Vamberg
- Bishop Caius Pillphrock
- John Chandros
- General Marcus Drummond

== Chronology ==
Year	Events
1831	Helena Petrovna Blavatsky is born
1841	Alexander Sparks is born
1844	Claude Leboux is born
1846	Madeline Rose Sparks is born, 53 days later she dies
1847	Jack Sparks is born; Bram Stoker is born
1852	Jack discovers he has a brother
1854	Jack meets Alexander for the first time
1859	Jack meets Alexander for the last time; Jack's parents die in a fire; Arthur Conan Doyle is born
1872	Alexander returns to London; Jack begins his career
1877	Publication of Blavatsky's Isis Unveiled
1878	Jack reforms Larry and Barry
1879	Jack begins a game of Gin Rummy with Larry that will last five years
1881	Arthur Conan Doyle serves as ship's doctor; meets Claude Leboux, a navy cutter
1882	Eileen Temple joins the Manchester Plays
1884	Jack is imprisoned in Bedlam by Sir Nigel Gull for a month
1884-5	Events of The List of Seven
1885	Jack and Alexander Sparks seemingly die at Reichenbach Falls
1889	Doyle visits Reichenbach Falls; Adolf Hitler is born.

== Jack's Headquarters ==
Located at 26 Montague Street, Jack's London headquarters is a Georgian townhouse full of curious items, guarded by Zeus a large dog. It is situated opposite the British Museum.

=== Living Room ===
In the main sitting room almost every inch of the walls are covered with bookshelves. Sitting at the far end of the room is a long chemistry bench covered with an array of apparatus, behind it is a very large map of London studded with a legion of red- and blue-headed pins. Jack calls this "the devil's chessboard" it records the location of various crimes around London. In one corner is a display cabinet holding a diverse collection of antique and exotic weaponry, from Stone Age daggers, to flintlocks, to ninja throwing stars. In the opposite corner there sits a stack of index cabinets with 12 drawers called "The Brain", above which is a bull's-eye target of thatched straw with the letters VR spelled out in bullet holes.

=== The Brain ===
"The Brain" is a comprehensive compendium of every known criminal in London. It consists of an index card per criminal in alphabetical order, with the following information; their age, their date and place of birth, family history, schooling and service records; recognised methods of operation, known confederates, cell mates, bed mates and habitates; physical description, aliases, arrests, convictions and time served.

Each card is encoded in an amalgam of mathematical formula, Urdu, Sanskrit, and an obscure variation of the Finno-Ugric root language.

=== Dressing Room ===
In the dressing room there are walls lined with a vast array of costumes. A makeup table ringed with lights and sporting all kinds of makeups and brushes. A jury of featureless wooden heads wear a range of wigs and facial hair. Stacks of hatboxes, piles of boxes of catalogued accessories, and wallets with forged identities.

In the center sits a sewing machine that allows Jack to create new costumes as required.

=== The Window ===
Visible from the window is a tailor's dummy that once took a sniper's bullet for Jack.

== Jack's Oath ==
Jack asks Doyle to take the following oath:

From the point of Light within the Mind of God,

let Light stream forth into the minds of men.
Let Light descend on Earth.

From the centre where the Will of God is known,
let purpose guide the little wills of men -
the purpose which the Mastery know and serve.

From the centre which we called the race of men,
let the plan of Love and Light work out,
and may it seal the door where Evil dwells.

Let the Light and Love and Power restore the plan to Earth.

== Allusions to literary works ==
=== Allusions to Sherlock Holmes ===
Because the premise of the novel is that Doyle was inspired by what happened to him to write his successful works, there are strong parallels between many characters and events in the novel and Doyle's works:

- Jack Sparks is a model for Sherlock Holmes: ascetic, aloof, mentally and physically extraordinary. Sparks is also addicted to cocaine, although Holmes indulges in his habit for recreation, while Sparks is ashamed of his addiction.
- On the train to Whitby Sparks also uses a magnifying glass, smokes a pipe and play strange music on his violin, characteristics similar to Sherlock Holmes.
- Alexander Sparks is a model for Holmes's nemesis, James Moriarty, a criminal mastermind at the centre of all the London underworld's plans.
- The scene described by Larry when Jack and Alexander go over the Reichenbach Falls together is quoted from Doyle's short stories “The Final Problem” and “The Mystery of the Empty House” where Holmes and Moriarty die in the same manner, with Lady Caroline Nicholson, acting as a sniper, taking the place of Colonel Sebastian Moran.
- Inspector Leboux can be seen as a role model for Inspector Lestrade (and also to a less extent Inspector Gregson), a good solid, unimaginative Scotland Yard Inspector.
- Jack's Headquarters have allusions to a range of Holmes stories, the V:R on the wall (The Musgrave Ritual), "The Brain" can be seen as a model for Holmes' "index of biographies" (The Adventure of the Empty House), the tailor's dummy is from "The Adventure of the Empty House" and Zeus is described similarly to "The Hound of the Baskervilles". Additionally the chemical bench is seen in any number of Holmes' stories and Jack's dressing room is Holmes' bedroom with the various makeups and disguises.
- Jack's Regulars (who are made up mostly of criminals but with a few civilians) can be seen as a grown-up version of Holmes' Irregulars.
- Professor Armond Sacker's name is based on the original name for Watson: Ormond Sacker.
- Rathbourne & Sons might be a slight reference to Basil Rathbone who famously portrayed Holmes.
- The scene involving the home full of people driven mad is an allusion to "The Adventure Of the Devil's Foot" in which "devil's foot" (a form of poison) is ignited in a closed room and causes the occupants to go mad and eventually die from inhalation of the deadly fumes.

=== Allusions to Dracula ===
- In the company of Bram Stoker, Larry and Barry recount a story they heard in a Whitby pub, about how the Seven's ship beached in the middle of the night, and its crew seemed to unload coffins, and the witness was found dead the next day, mauled by a wolf. This is reminiscent of how Count Dracula arrives in England in Stoker's novel.
- Elements of Alexander Sparks character can also be seen as a model for Dracula; Dresses all in black, a hypnotic presence, and appears over sleeping ladies' beds all the time.

== Allusions to real life history, events, or people ==
Several historical persons appear as characters:

- Arthur Conan Doyle is the main protagonist of the story
- Bram Stoker appears in the latter half of the story to provide useful information
- Queen Victoria appears at the end of the story to thank Doyle
- Prince Albert Victor, Duke of Clarence appears as a deranged fool in the story.
- Adolf Hitler appears as a baby in the epilogue of the story
- Sir Nigel Gull appears to be a direct parallel to Sir William Gull, also a physician to the Royal Family, and popularly rumoured in history as a suspect in the Jack the Ripper murders.
- Professor Arminius Vamberg is a reference to Arminius Vambery, a Hungarian scholar who is thought to have been one of Bram Stoker's sources when he wrote Dracula and is sometimes cited as one of the inspirations for the character Professor Abraham Van Helsing.

== Movie adaptation ==
Some sketches for a potential movie adaptation of The List of Seven are included in the 2013 book Guillermo del Toro Cabinet of Curiosities. Two pages with sketches are included, one featuring a zombie-type character, and the other a large doomsday machine. In the text del Toro comments that the characterization of Jack Sparks he envisioned is similar to Robert Downey Jr.'s Sherlock Holmes.

== See also ==
- The Six Messiahs by Mark Frost
- The Arcanum by Thomas Wheeler
- Nevermore by William Hjortsberg
