= On the Air (TV series) =

American sitcom

- Genre: Sitcom; Surreal humour Absurdism
- Created by: Mark Frost; David Lynch
- Starring: Ian Buchanan; Nancye Ferguson; Miguel Ferrer; Gary Grossman; Mel Johnson Jr.; Marvin Kaplan; David L. Lander; Kim McGuire; Marla Rubinoff; Tracey Walter
- Theme music composer: Angelo Badalamenti
- Composer: Angelo Badalamenti
- Country of origin: United States
- Original language: English
- No. of seasons: 1
- No. of episodes: 7 (4 unaired in US)

Production
- Executive producers: Mark Frost; David Lynch; Robert Engels
- Camera setup: Single-camera
- Running time: 30 minutes
- Production company: Lynch/Frost Productions

Original release
- Network: ABC
- Release: June 20 – July 4, 1992

On the Air is an American television sitcom created by Mark Frost and David Lynch. It was broadcast from June 20 to July 4, 1992 on ABC. The series follows the staff of a fictional 1950s television network, Zoblotnick Broadcasting Company (ZBC), as they produce a live variety show called The Lester Guy Show, often with disastrous results. On the Air was produced by Lynch/Frost Productions and followed Lynch and Frost's previous series, Twin Peaks. A total of seven episodes were produced; only three were aired on ABC, though the full run was broadcast in the United Kingdom and other European countries.

The series stars Ian Buchanan, Marla Rubinoff, Nancye Ferguson, Miguel Ferrer, Gary Grossman, Mel Johnson Jr., Marvin Kaplan, David L. Lander, Kim McGuire and Tracey Walter. David Lynch directed the pilot, while the remaining episodes were directed by others, including Lesli Linka Glatter and Jonathan Sanger, who had both previously directed episodes of Twin Peaks.

== Characters ==
=== Main ===
- Ian Buchanan as Lester Guy, a washed-up British movie star who stayed stateside during World War II and made a name for himself because every Hollywood leading man was off fighting the war. He is the star of The Lester Guy Show, but is outshone by supporting actress Betty Hudson. He often plots to increase his popularity, or to sabotage Betty. He frequently winds up with a head injury.
- Nancye Ferguson as Ruth Trueworthy, production assistant on The Lester Guy Show. She is also the assistant director because she is the only person who can understand Mister Gotchktch.
- Miguel Ferrer as Bud Budwaller, the president of Zoblotnick Broadcasting Corporation. He discovers washed-up actor Lester Guy drinking vodka from a frozen orange juice can in West Hollywood; hoping for a promotion, Budwaller introduces Lester to Mr. Zoblotnick, the president of the network, knowing that Zoblotnick is a fan of Lester's performance in a WWII-era musical. As Betty's popularity grows, Budwaller fears losing his job.
- Gary Grossman as Bert Schein, a supporting actor on The Lester Guy Show.
- Mel Johnson Jr. as Mickey, technician for The Lester Guy Show.
- Marvin Kaplan as Dwight McGonigle, the oft-flustered producer of The Lester Guy Show, frequently bewildered.
- David L. Lander as Valdja Gochktch, Mr. Zoblotnick's nephew and director of The Lester Guy Show. He speaks English with a near-incomprehensible accent, and lives in abject fear of Bud Budwaller.
- Kim McGuire as Nicole Thorne, Zoblotnick Broadcasting Corporation's Head of Comedy. She worries that if The Lester Guy Show fails she will lose her job, and goes along with Lester and Budwaller's plans to "break" Betty.
- Marla Jeanette Rubinoff as Betty Hudson, an ingénue with no acting experience. She quickly earns a tremendous fan base due to her simple gentleness, unintentionally overshadowing Lester, who feels threatened.
- Tracey Walter as Billy "Blinky" Watts, technician for The Lester Guy Show, who is repeatedly stated throughout the show to have a condition called "Bozeman's simplex", which allows him to see 25.62 times as much as other people do.

=== Recurring ===
- Irwin Keyes as Shorty, a burly stagehand.
- Raleigh and Raymond Friend as The Hurry Up Twins, a pair of conjoined twins who wear a two-necked sweater at all times.
- Snaps the Dog, a canine actor introduced in the first episode as the reluctant "spokesdog" for The Lester Guy Show sponsor Welby Snap's brand dog food.

== Episodes ==
No.	Title	Directed by	Written by	Produced by	Original release date
1	"The Lester Guy Show"	David Lynch	Mark Frost, David Lynch	Gregg Fienberg	June 20, 1992
The Lester Guy Show is about to premiere live, with a dramatic kitchen scene planned as the show's climactic moment. A mishap with the sound effects board and a comical head injury reduces the kitchen scene to farce, redeemed by starlet Betty Hudson's tender rendition of a song "The Bird in the Tree". Note – In 1997 TV Guide ranked this episode number 57 on its "100 Greatest Episodes of All Time" list.
2	"Episode 1.2"	Lesli Linka Glatter	Mark Frost	Deepak Nayar, Robert Engels	N/A
Betty's popularity soars, she receives fan mail, galore, and she is invited to dinner by network owner Mister Zoblotnick. Budwaller, Guy and Nicole plot to ruin her dinner and humiliate her but their plan backfires.
3	"Episode 1.3"	Jack Fisk	Robert Engels	Deepak Nayar, Robert Engels	June 27, 1992
Lester plots to destroy Betty by hosting a rigged quiz show, pitting her and her 7th grade teacher, Mrs. Thissle, against Professor R. Answer, the man with the highest I.Q. ever recorded. Betty and Mrs. Thissle prevail until Mrs. Thissle, realizing that she is on live TV, has a panic attack. Mr. McGonigle, dazed on allergy medicine, substitutes as Betty's partner, and they manage to coincidentally answer the final question to win the game.
4	"Episode 1.4"	Jonathan Sanger	Scott Frost	Deepak Nayar, Robert Engels	N/A
Guest stars this week are Doodles the Duck and star of stage and screen Stan Tailings. Lester hopes that his and Tailings's superior acting will help him derail Betty's ever-growing popularity, but Tailings has voice issues and suffers from coughing fits. Doodles is accidentally fried by technicians, who go on to eat him. Tailings's continual voice problems and Lester's run-in with a prop electric chair once again dash Lester's plans and reduce the dramatic show to farce.
5	"Episode 1.5"	Lesli Linka Glatter	Mark Frost	Deepak Nayar, Robert Engels	July 4, 1992
Betty is nervous over the appearance on the show of her famous sister Sylvia Hudson, an early television pioneer. Also on the show is Mr. Peanuts, a puppet from a popular children's show (operated by guest star Chuck McCann). After Sylvia humiliates Mr. Peanuts on the air, Betty and the cast cheer him by singing his theme, "The Mr. Peanuts Song." Even the hard-hearted Buddy Budwaller is moved.
6	"Episode 1.6"	Betty Thomas	Robert Engels	Deepak Nayar, Robert Engels	N/A
This week's guest is Mr. Zoblotnick's favorite gypsy magician, The Great Presidio, who is scheduled to perform his most famous trick, the Gypsy Traveler. Presidio, however, thinks he is an auto mechanic and is unable to perform. He fears "the dog of transformation". Lester and Nicole plot to steal the show by sabotaging the Gypsy Traveler and having Lester learn and perform his own magic tricks. On the air, while Lester is trying to perform a trick and Nicole is trapped in a magic box, Presidio spies Snaps the Dog who Nicole has dressed as the Great Presidio's description of "the dog of transformation." The magician regains his powers; he transforms Nicole into a lizard and uses the Gypsy Traveler trick to teleport Lester to Akron, Ohio.
7	"Episode 1.7"	Jack Fisk	David Lynch, Robert Engels	Deepak Nayar, Robert Engels	N/A
Lester is amazed by The Woman with No Name, a beatnik he has seen perform "down town." He invites her and her crew, the Voids, to appear on the Special "Salute to Summer" episode of The Lester Guy Show, and demands that Budwaller allow her to perform. Meanwhile, Betty is upset because she cannot remember her mother's first name. Lester and Nicole once again plot to destroy Betty, this time using a "voice disintegrator." During the show, however, the device ends up disintegrating Lester's voice instead of Betty's. As The Woman with No Name performs an avant-garde dance, Betty sings a song that features the name Mary, and joyously remembers that this is her mother's name. Because "beatnik" means "bootmaker" in their language, Mr. Zoblotnick and Valdja present The Woman with No Name with many pairs of boots and shoes. The show ends with Budwaller admitting that he understands nothing about his audience, and joins the entire cast and crew in a dance routine involving bare feet and shoes on hands. At the end of the show, Betty Hudson is nowhere to be found.

== Broadcast ==
=== On ABC ===
ABC broadcast the series during the summer of 1992, starting on Saturday 20 June at 9:30 pm for episode 1, and ending on Saturday 4 July the same year with episode 5, episode 6 (nor 7) not being broadcast.

=== International broadcasts ===
All seven episodes were aired from 25 July 1993 in the United Kingdom by BBC2, in Italy by Telemontecarlo, in the Netherlands by VPRO, in Sweden by SVT, in Finland by MTV3, in Poland by TVP2 and in France by Canal Jimmy. At least four episodes were aired in Canada. The entire run was aired in Australia on The Comedy Channel through the Foxtel cable TV provider. Some episodes have been aired by the Bulgarian Nova Television.

== Reception ==
When it first aired, Ken Tucker of Entertainment Weekly gave it a positive B+ review, writing, "On the Air is a one-joke sitcom that makes explicit the message that... TV is stupid, and people will watch anything. Its undisguised contempt is pretty enthralling."

In 2008, Keith Phipps of The A.V. Club wrote: "On the Air is filled with endearing characters and memorably odd touches."

In 2017, Daniel Kurland of Den of Geek wrote that "On the Air's pilot is its strongest episode […] the content slowly goes downhill as the show continues. This isn't exactly unexpected, as other writers tried to play with the pilot's strong voice and fumbled under the pressure, but you're still getting something uniquely different every week, and that should be exciting in itself. There is a degree of joy and surprise around this comedy that is sorely absent from the majority of TV these days."

Les Inrockuptibles called it "Lynch's forgotten series" while David Foster Wallace found it was a "mercifully ablated TV program".
