= Amy Annelle =

American folk musician

Amy Annelle is an American songwriter and folk musician.

== Recordings ==
Annelle is best known for her rendition of Townes Van Zandt’s Buckskin Stallion Blues, featured in the Academy Award-winning film Three Billboards Outside Ebbing, Missouri.

Following a long battle with chronic illness, Annelle released The Toll, co-produced by Annelle and Cooper McBean, mixed by Darryl Neudorf and mastered by Greg Calbi, in 2024. McBean also appears on the record, contributing vocals, guitar, banjo, bass and accordion. Other performers are Thom Washburn (drums, vocals and percussion), Beth Chrisman (violin), Henna Chou (cello), Bob Hoffnar (pedal steel guitar), Elaine Barber (harp) and Brian Beattie who plays the celeste. Jolie Holland makes a guest appearance on the album's opening track, Pull Tabs and Broken Glass. The Toll was recorded at Annelle's home studio in Austin's Montopolis neighborhood.

Annelle released her debut single Rudy, in 1998. She has also contributed to the work of fellow artists Bill Callahan, Daniel Johnston, Michael Hurley, and Jandek, has released a stream of critically acclaimed solo albums, first using the moniker “The Places,” then her own name.

== Health issues ==
In 2010 Annelle was hospitalized and diagnosed with stage IV endometriosis. After several years of surgeries and treatment, she traveled to the Center for Endometriosis Care in Atlanta, Georgia in 2017 for excision surgery. Her visit was partially funded by a Designated Artist Fund set up by the Sweet Relief Musicians Fund. Annelle is active in the endometriosis education movement.

== Discography ==
=== As a leader ===
- The Toll (High Plains Sigh, 2024)
- Surgery (High Plains Sigh, 2015)
- The Great Unveiling (High Plains Sigh, 2012)
- Rocky Mountain High (High Plains Sigh, 2010)
- The Cimarron Banks (High Plains Sigh, 2010)
- "Some From the Stream" Tour Compilation (High Plains Sigh, 2008)
- Live On WFMU (High Plains Sigh, 2009)
- A School of Secret Dangers (Hush, 2001)
- Which One's You? (Hush, 1999)
- Fuel Compilation, Amy Annelle as Underwater Salvage Partners, (Arena Rock, 1997)

=== with The Places ===
- Songs for Creeps (High Plains Sigh, 2006)
- Fawns With Fangs: Selections from the Dark Heart of the Thicket (High Plains Sigh, 2005)
- Appetizers & Leftovers, Austin, TX Compilation (I Eat Records, 2005)
- Call It Sleep (Hush, 2004)
- Pop Life Vol. 9 Compilation (Contact Records Japan, 2002)
- The Autopilot Knows You Best (Absolutely Kosher, 2000)

=== Precious Blood (Amy Annelle & Ralph White duo) ===
- Top of the Holler (High Plains Sigh, 2009)
- "KVRX Local Live" Compilation, 2009

=== With others ===
- Various Three Billboards Outside Ebbing, Missouri Soundtrack (Varèse Sarabande, 2018)
- Bill Callahan, Ytilaer (arranging and singing of harmony vocals)
