= Chino "Fats" Williams =

American actor

- Born: July 26, 1933; Louisiana, U.S.
- Died: April 5, 2000 (aged 66); Los Angeles, California, U.S.
- Occupation: Actor
- Years active: 1974–1996
- Children: 1

Chino "Fats" Williams (July 26, 1933 – April 5, 2000) was an American actor.

Williams was best known for such films and television series as The Terminator, Action Jackson, Road House, Rocky III, Weird Science, Iron Eagle, Storyville, House Party, and Baretta.

Chino Williams' last film appearance was the 1996 film Killin' Me Softly. Williams died at the age of 66 due to complications from kidney failure that had occurred years earlier.

== Filmography ==
- The Gravy Train (1974) - Chicken Man (uncredited)
- Rocky (1976) - Man in unemployment line (uncredited)
- Rocky II (1979) - Job searcher (uncredited)
- Defiance (1980) - Local #2
- Rocky III (1982) - Derelict
- Swing Shift (1984) - Bouncer at Kelly's
- The Terminator (1984) - Truck Driver
- Weird Science (1985) - Bar Patron
- Iron Eagle (1986) - Slappy
- Wildcats (1986) - Poolhall Man #2
- Jumpin' Jack Flash (1986) - Larry (The Heavyset Guard)
- Planes, Trains and Automobiles (1987) - Marathon Shuttle Driver (uncredited)
- Action Jackson (1988) - Kid Sable
- Hot to Trot (1988) - Messenger
- Road House (1989) - Derelict
- House Party (1990) - Fats
- Secret Agent OO Soul (1990) - Owner of Bertha's Cafe
- Talkin' Dirty After Dark (1991) - Club Patron
- Bebe's Kids (1992) - Card Player #2 (voice)
- Storyville (1992) - Theotis Washington
- Killin' Me Softly (1996) - Uncle Wesley (final film role)
