= Twin Peaks: The Final Dossier =

2017 novel by Mark Frost

- Author: Mark Frost
- Language: English
- Genre: Supernatural, mystery, alternate history, magical realism
- Set in: United States
- Publisher: Flatiron Books
- Publication date: October 31, 2017
- Publication place: United States
- Media type: Print, digital
- Pages: 160
- ISBN: 978-1509802043 (print edition)
- Dewey Decimal: 791.4572
- Website: Official website

Twin Peaks: The Final Dossier is an epistolary supernatural mystery novel by Mark Frost, based on the television series Twin Peaks (1990–2017). It serves as a sequel to Frost's earlier book, The Secret History of Twin Peaks (2016) and the 2017 revival of the series. The novel is presented as a series of FBI reports detailing the fates of several inhabitants of the fictional town following the events of the series finale.

The book was initially released by Flatiron Books on October 31, 2017.

== Summary ==
Unlike The Secret History of Twin Peaks, which was composed of many documents compiled by Major Garland Briggs, The Final Dossier contains a series of 18 FBI reports written by Agent Preston following the events of the entire series, which expand on the fates of several characters which were not explained in the television series or the previous book, and clarifying some apparent discrepancies between them.

1. Leo Johnson autopsy report
2. Shelley Johnson
3. Donna Hayward
4. Ben and Audrey Horne
5. Jerry Horne
6. The Double R
7. Annie Blackburn
8. Windom Earle
9. Back in Twin Peaks
10. Miss Twin Peaks
11. Dr. Lawrence Jacoby
12. Margaret Coulson
13. Sheriff Harry Truman
14. Major Briggs
15. Phillip Jeffries
16. Judy
17. Ray Monroe
18. Today

The book ends with Preston suspecting the timeline has changed around them, with the residents of Twin Peaks believing Laura Palmer disappeared rather than being found dead, and she hastily leaves the town as her memory and previous knowledge of the Palmer case begins to fade.

== Background ==
Published after the broadcast of the 2017 series, it takes the form of a Federal Bureau of Investigation report written by Special Agent Tammy Preston for FBI Deputy Director Gordon Cole, on the fates and fortunes of various residents of Twin Peaks, and other individuals encountered during the revival of the show.

== Reception ==
Stuart Kelly of The Scotsman commented "Like the TV version, there is an unsettling balance between gothic horror and slapstick comedy. One very minor character in the original, the vampish Lana – rather winkingly referred to as having “the eternal appeal of the ‘dark feminine’ archetype” – gets a quick cameo on the arm of “a notorious resident of a certain eponymous tower on Fifth Avenue, who was either between wives, stepping out or window shopping”. Yes, that's where Trump Tower is, and yes, he is wearing the strange jade-green ring which symbolises darkness and corruption. This is a book with a lot of anger about where America is going, set around an idyll that never existed". Glen Weldon of NPR stated "The Final Dossier is all story — in fact, it reads like the "story bible" television showrunners create to build a show's narrative universe, filled with all the good, grounding stuff The Return never bothered with".
