= The Six Messiahs =

1995 novel by Mark Frost

- Cover of The Six Messiahs
- Author: Mark Frost
- Language: English
- Published: 1995 (William Morrow & Co)

The Six Messiahs is a 1995 novel by Mark Frost, a sequel to his 1993 novel The List of Seven. The two main characters are real-life person Arthur Conan Doyle (albeit engaging in fictional actions) and fictional character Jack Sparks.

== Summary ==
The year is 1894, and Arthur Conan Doyle is visiting America on a book tour with his brother, Innes Doyle. He is also secretly investigating the disappearance of a number of holy books, on the orders of Lord Gladstone. En route to New York City, there is a mysterious murder of a rare book dealer aboard their steamer. Even more shocking, an elderly priest traveling with them reveals himself as a disguised Jack Sparks, who survived his fall over the Reichenbach Falls but has become a broken man (physically and spiritually).

Jack has been experiencing a series of dreams about a "black tower" in the middle of a desert, which has drawn him to America. Identical dreams have also been experienced by four other diverse individuals, some of whom are also investigating the recent thefts of holy books. These include:

- Kanazuchi: a Buddhist monk from Japan and a deadly warrior, who travels to San Francisco from Japan and learns that a holy text stolen from his monastery was taken east from California;
- Walks Alone, aka Mary Williams: a Native American woman following her dreams west, toward Utah;
- Rabbi Jacob Stern: an elderly Talmudic scholar from Chicago and expert on Kabbalah;
- Peregrine "Presto" Raipur: an Indian prince and amateur magician;

Also included in the mix are: Eileen Temple, English actress and Doyle's former lover, traveling west with her second-rate theatre troupe; and Dante Scruggs, a serial killer recruited by the book thieves.

Various characters meet each other along the way, all of them converging inexorably on the mysteriously named "New City" in Utah, a religious community founded by the Reverend A. Glorious Day. The center of the town is a cathedral-sized black stone tower built by the town's residents

Jack reveals to Doyle that his criminal brother, Alexander, also survived the fall over the Reichenbach Falls; after the collapse of his earlier plans to bring about the Apocalypse, he has come up with a new one. Working with a team of professional mercenaries from the now underground Hanseatic League, Alexander (now Reverend Day) has commissioned the theft of the holy books from every major religion, hoping to perform a ceremony that will "destroy" God, and allow "the Beast" to enter their world. The city's inhabitants, acting through a mix of religious fanaticism and mind control from Alexander, are unknowingly all meant to be slaughtered inside the tower as part of the ceremony.

The action ends with a bloody confrontation in the desert, as Jack, Doyle, and their allies fight their way into the tower to reach Alexander before the "Beast" is summoned, and to stop the massacre of as many townspeople as possible.

When the two Sparks brothers come face-to-face again, something unexpected happens: Jack forgives his brother. Alexander collapses, relieved of the burden of his madness and his terrible crimes. Together, the "Six Messiahs," including Alexander, join and their combined power helps drive the Beast back down. Alexander dies thereafter, and Jacob pronounces a melancholy epitaph for him: "He thought he wanted to destroy God. But in reality, all he wanted to destroy was himself."

The world is saved, and Jack is hoisted "back into the light" by his friend, Doyle.

== Characters ==
=== Arthur Conan Doyle ===
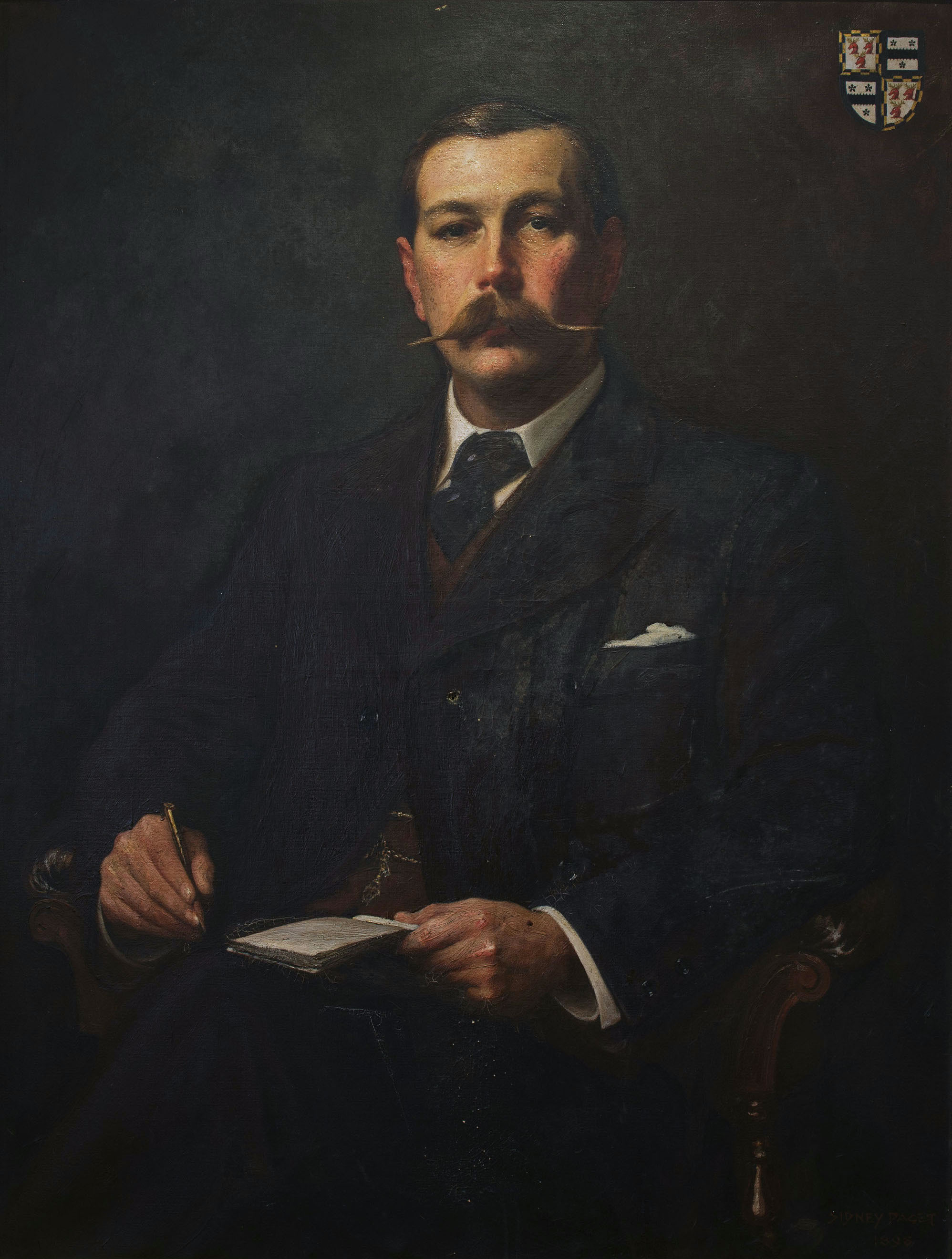
Portrait of Sir Arthur Conan Doyle by Sidney Paget, 1897.

It is ten years after the events of The List of Seven and Arthur is older and a lot wiser. He has served the Crown on a number of occasions since then and is the highly successful author of the Sherlock Holmes stories. By this time he has become sick of writing the Holmes stories and killed him off the same way Jack died in real-life plunging over Reichenbach Falls.

=== Jack Sparks ===
Having survived the fight with his brother at Reichenbach Falls, Jack has injured his hands significantly. His is very closed and guarded about the years since his late meeting with Doyle.

=== Eileen Temple ===
Since the events surrounding her last meeting with Arthur Conan Doyle, Eileen left England for America.

== Background ==
=== Themes ===
One of the book's recurring themes is how Doyle is constantly hounded by Holmes fans, demanding to know how he could have killed off Holmes, and whether he will bring him back in a future book. This is Frost's jab at his being hounded by Twin Peaks fans during his book tour for The List of Seven.

=== Characters ===
The character Major Rolando Pepperman is derived from Conan Doyle's American tour manager, Major J.B. Pond. The book's ending leaves ambiguous whether Doyle and Eileen resume their affair, begun in The List of Seven. At this time, Doyle's wife, Louisa, was suffering the debilitating effects of tuberculosis, which prevented them from being physically close. In real life, after Louisa's death, Doyle remarried to a woman, Jean Leckie, with whom he had fallen in love while Louisa was still alive, though he kept their relationship platonic out of loyalty to Louisa.

=== Kabbalah ===
The premise of the purported Apocalyptic ceremony is explained largely through Jacob Stern's explanation to Eileen about the beliefs in Kabbalah, including that written words carry a divine power of their own, and that belief in the Messiah is not centered on a person as much as on certain qualities and powers that set one or more persons apart from others.

== Chronology ==
Year	Events
1841	Alexander Sparks is born
1847	Jack Sparks is born
1884-5	Events of The List of Seven
1885	Jack and Alexander Sparks seemingly die at Reichenbach Falls
1889	Doyle visits Reichenbach Falls
1894	Events of The Six Messiahs
