= Storyville (film) =

1992 film

- Directed by: Mark Frost
- Written by: Mark Frost; Lee Reynolds
- Based on: Juryman by: Frank Galbally; Robert Macklin
- Produced by: Edward R. Pressman; David Roe
- Starring: James Spader; Joanne Whalley-Kilmer; Jason Robards; Charlotte Lewis; Michael Warren; Piper Laurie
- Cinematography: Ronald Víctor García
- Edited by: B.J. Sears
- Music by: Carter Burwell
- Production companies: Davis Entertainment; Grand Bay Films International Pty.
- Distributed by: 20th Century Fox (United States); Spelling Films International (International)
- Release date: August 26, 1992
- Running time: 113 minutes
- Country: United States
- Language: English
- Budget: $15 million
- Box office: $422,503

Storyville is a 1992 American Southern Gothic film directed by Mark Frost, and starring James Spader, Joanne Whalley and Jason Robards. The film takes its name from the historic Storyville red-light district of New Orleans.

== Premise ==
Cray Fowler, a young New Orleans lawyer running for congress, is filmed with a prostitute as blackmail. As he investigates, Fowler discovers some shocking secrets involving his father, his family's fortune and his own political advisors.

== Cast ==
- James Spader as Cray Fowler
- Joanne Whalley-Kilmer as Natalie Tate
- Jason Robards as Clifford Fowler
- Charlotte Lewis as Lee Tran
- Michael Warren as Nathan LeFleur
- Piper Laurie as Constance Fowler
- Michael Parks as Michael Trevallian
- Chuck McCann as Pudge Herman
- Charles Haid as Abe Choate
- Chino Fats Williams as Theotis Washington
- Woody Strode as Charlie Sumpter
- Jeff Perry as Peter Dandridge
- Galyn Görg as Spice
- Justine Arlin as Melanie Fowler
- George Kee Cheung as Xang Tran
- Steve Forrest as Judge Quentin Murdoch

== Critical reception ==
On Rotten Tomatoes the film has an approval rating of 67% based on 6 reviews.

Roger Ebert gave the film 3.5 out of 4 stars, writing, "Storyville is a movie for people who like New Orleans better when it is dark and mysterious. It is for romantics. It is not for pragmatists, who will complain that the characters do not behave according to perfect logic, and that there are holes in its plot. They will be right, of course – this is not an airtight movie – but they will have missed the point, and the fun."

James Spader's performance was praised by critics, including Vincent Canby of The New York Times who wrote, "Mr. Spader may have won prizes for Sex, Lies, and Videotape but he comes of age as an actor in Storyville. The performance is clean, uncluttered and often funny, without sidestepping the material."

Canby also praised the film's cinematography and Frost's directing, invoking Frost's collaboration with David Lynch on Twin Peaks, and calling the film "far less of a tease than the television series, a good deal shorter and much more fun."
