= The Secret History of Twin Peaks =

2016 novel by Mark Frost

- Author: Mark Frost
- Language: English
- Genre: Supernatural, mystery, alternate history, magical realism
- Set in: United States
- Publisher: Flatiron Books
- Publication date: October 18, 2016
- Publication place: United States
- Media type: Print, digital
- Pages: 359
- ISBN: 978-1-250-07558-1 (print edition)
- OCLC: 963918085
- Dewey Decimal: 791.4572
- LC Class: PS3556.R599
- Website: Official website

The Secret History of Twin Peaks is a 2016 epistolary supernatural mystery novel by Mark Frost, based on the television series Twin Peaks (1990–2017). It is written in the form of a dossier compiling background information on the history of the fictional town, its citizens, and the extraordinary phenomena surrounding them.

The novel was published through Flatiron Books as a tie-in to the release of the 2017 Twin Peaks revival. A sequel, Twin Peaks: The Final Dossier, was published in 2017.

== Summary ==
The book takes the form of a dossier of documents, letters, clippings and notes compiled by an unnamed individual referred to as The Archivist. The dossier was recovered in a steel lockbox at an undisclosed crime scene, and has been assigned by Federal Bureau of Investigation Deputy Director Gordon Cole to an FBI analyst with the initials "TP" for review and investigation.

The documents are presented in a roughly chronological order, beginning with the exploration of the area by the Lewis and Clark Expedition, correspondence with President Thomas Jefferson, and Meriwether Lewis's mysterious death in 1809. The next section concerns the flight of the Nez Perce people from the area, with their leader Chief Joseph. Both Lewis and Joseph are mentioned to have experienced "vision quests" in the area where Twin Peaks would be founded.

The town of Twin Peaks is founded when two families, the Packards and the Martells, form two rival sawmills on either side of the river. In 1927, boy scout Andrew Packard and scoutmaster Dwayne Milford see a giant figure in the woods during a camping trip. Milford confides to Packard that his brother, Douglas Milford, also reported seeing a similar figure. Douglas Milford—a minor character in the television series—subsequently becomes one of the key figures in the book. His involvement with the Roswell UFO incident while with the U.S. Army Air Forces sees him assigned to investigate UFO sightings and abduction claims for Project Sign, Project Grudge and Project Blue Book, and to establish Listening Post Alpha, a SETI facility near Twin Peaks. In 1940, three children including Maggie Coulson (the Log Lady), Carl Rodd (the trailer park owner from Fire Walk with Me) and Alan Traherne, go missing in the woods, re-appearing with strange triangular markings on their bodies, and no memory of that day.

The last section covers the events of the television series, including the murder of Laura Palmer. The backstories of several other characters including Josie Packard, Lawrence Jacoby, Ed and Nadine Hurley, and Norma and Hank Jennings are revealed in extracts from a book on notable local families by Dr. Lawrence Jacoby's brother Robert. The Archivist is revealed to be Major Garland Briggs, whose final entry in the dossier notes that "something's wrong" with Dale Cooper and ends with the word "*M*A*Y*D*A*Y*". The FBI analyst notes that Briggs subsequently disappeared, and Cooper's whereabouts are also unknown, with files on them at the USAF and FBI classified well above top secret. She signs off her investigation notes as Special Agent Tamara Preston.

== Background ==
The book was published in October 2016, several months before the debut of the revival of the series in May 2017. A follow-up book, Twin Peaks: The Final Dossier, also written by Frost, was released after the new season aired. The audiobook release features four original cast members from the original and sequel television series, Kyle MacLachlan, Russ Tamblyn, Michael Horse, and David Patrick Kelly, joined by original cast member Chris Mulkey and cocreator Mark Frost, and introduces 2017 season actors Amy Shiels, Robert Knepper, and James Morrison.

== Reception ==
Twin Peaks co-creator, writer and director David Lynch, when asked what he thought of the book, stated that he hadn't read it and that it was "his [Frost's] history of Twin Peaks".

Devan Coggan of Entertainment Weekly wrote "More than 25 years after Laura Palmer was found wrapped in plastic, Twin Peaks co-creator Mark Frost returns to the Pacific Northwest with a new novel structured as a secret dossier. Assembled by a mysterious 'archivist' and annotated by an FBI agent known only as TP, this enigmatic collection includes undiscovered Lewis and Clark diary entries, UFO sightings, and personal journals of Twin Peaks residents. Plus, Frost (finally!) tackles unanswered questions from the show's finale".

Eric Diaz of Nerdist commented "If you love Twin Peaks, there is no way I can't recommend this book to you, although it really is made for the hardcore fan. And if you were looking for answers to mysteries laid out by the series finale, except for a few (Audrey lives!) you'll probably be disappointed. But hey, we have a whole new season of the show coming for all that. Taken together with the excellent audio version, this is a multimedia experience no Twin Peaks fan can afford to ignore".
