= The Good Liar (soundtrack) =

The Good Liar (Original Motion Picture Soundtrack)

Film score by Carter Burwell
- Released: November 8, 2019
- Recorded: 2019
- Venue: New York City
- Studio: The DiMenna Center for Classical Music; Manhattan Center
- Genre: Film score
- Length: 47:39
- Label: WaterTower Music
- Producer: Carter Burwell

Carter Burwell chronology
The Morning Show (2019)	The Good Liar (2019)	Space Force (2020)

The Good Liar (Original Motion Picture Soundtrack) is the film score to the 2019 film The Good Liar directed by Bill Condon starring Ian McKellen and Helen Mirren. The score is composed by Carter Burwell and released through WaterTower Music on November 8, 2019.

== Development ==
Carter Burwell, who previously worked with Condon on Gods and Monsters (1998), Kinsey (2004), The Twilight Saga: Breaking Dawn – Part 1 (2011) and Part 2 (2012), The Fifth Estate (2013) and Mr. Holmes (2015) was announced as the film's composer in November 2018. For Burwell, the film was "a difficult combination of con artist thriller and perverse romance" where he struggled to find the right tone. He questioned Condon whether the music should be "conning" the audience, just as the characters con each other, though Condon did not think that was the right way. However, after watching the chemistry between the lead actors, he thought the most interesting angle was to suggest an actual romance between them in an "uncomfortable and perverse approach" which he liked it.

Burwell recalled on how Condon felt that we should give the audience permission to enjoy their deception and the twisted plot, allowing audience to invite the world, so rather than misleading the audience, they made them as co-conspirators in the proceedings. He and Condon liked referencing film history and compared it to Alfred Hitchcock's style in Vertigo (1958) where "the fire of obsession comes from love" and in this film, it comes to vengeance. This approach called for an amount of foreshadowing, so that it would draw the audience even though they did not know the story.

Burwell also admitted that the thrill comes from knowing a sense of misfortune, where the overture is played over the opening titles, in which the characters introduce themselves, and the music introduces the main themes which let the audience sense that they are not telling the truth. Regards to the instrumentation, he and Condon utilized strings and synthesizers as it captured the glossy look of modern London.

== Track listing ==
No.	Title	Length
1.	"The Good Liar"	3:41
2.	"Betty's Home"	1:19
3.	"The River Styx"	0:56
4.	"Up the Stairs"	0:34
5.	"A Wire"	1:25
6.	"Take Care of Our Problem"	1:39
7.	"Meat"	1:39
8.	"Haberdashery, Down the Tube"	4:09
9.	"Berlin Reise"	3:12
10.	"A Stop Along the Way"	3:24
11.	"Hans Taub Was Killed"	5:41
12.	"Stick to the Plan"	2:33
13.	"Does This Look Like Home?"	3:57
14.	"Proficient Enough"	3:45
15.	"I Went Back Home"	4:52
16.	"He's Lying"	2:19
17.	"Deeper Than It Looks"	2:34
Total length:		47:39

== Reception ==
Jonathan Broxton of Movie Music UK wrote "The fact that Carter Burwell has gone so far beyond these basics is really something worth acknowledging and celebrating, because it would have been very easy just to phone something in, have it work in context, and leave it at that. Instead, Burwell has crafted a score which has an interesting and compelling instrumental palette, and works with a quartet of thematic ideas which are not only enjoyable to listen to, but enhance the story, its narrative, and its subtext with subtle foreshadowing, clever layering, and an intellectual understanding of what the music is doing, and why." Jon Frosch of The Hollywood Reporter called it an "apt but unsurprising score". Joe Morgenstern of The Wall Street Journal noted "Carter Burwell's engaging score, suggests that we're having fun."

Johnny Olesinski of New York Post wrote "[The] invisible co-star is Carter Burwell's menacing score. The composer doesn't get talked about as much as his showier peers, but he wrote one of the finest film scores of the decade, for 2015's Carol. More so than any screen composer today, Burwell understands that music is there to express what cannot be said. And in a web of lies, that's a lot." David Ehlrich of IndieWire called it a "lilting, uneasy, Mr. Holmes-esque score". Elizabeth Weitzman of TheWrap wrote "Carter Burwell's insistent score constantly primes us for something big and ominous". Sandy Schaefer of Screen Rant noted that Burwell's music "set the tone for this noir-ish slow-burn thrill ride." Tara Brady of The Irish Times wrote "Director of photography Tobias A. Schliessler and composer Carter Burwell provide solid tech specs." Jake Coyle of AP News called it a "stirring score".

== Personnel ==
Credits adapted from liner notes:

- Music composer and producer – Carter Burwell
- Recording and mixing – Michael Farrow
- Mastering – Bob Ludwig
- Score editor – Todd Kasow
- Pro-tools operators and recordists – Angie Teo, Tim Marchiafava
- Musical assistance – Dean Parker
- Score coordinator – Celeste Chada
- Soundtrack coordinator – Jen O'Malley
- Copyist – Tony Finno
- Executive producer – Bill Condon
- Art direction – Sandeep Sriram
- Music business and legal affairs – Ari Taitz, John F.X. Walsh
- Executive in charge of music for New Line Cinema – Erin Scully, Kim Baum
- Executive in charge of WaterTower Music – Jason Linn

Orchestra

- Orchestra – Hollywood Studio Symphony
- Orchestrators – Carter Burwell, Sonny Kompanek
- Conductor – Carter Burwell
- Contractor – Sandra Park

Instruments

- Bass – Brendan Kane, Daniel Krekeler, John Patitucci, Lou Kosma, Pawel Knapik, Satoshi Okamoto
- Cello – Alan Stepansky, Alberto Parrini, Andrew Janss, Jerry Grossman, Joel Noyes, Julia Kang, Maureen McDermott, Nathan Vickery, Patrick Jee, Sophie Shao
- Clarinet – Dean LeBlanc, Liam Burke, Pavel Vinnitsky
- Flute – Mindy Kaufman
- Harp – Tori Drake
- Horn – Barbara Jöstlein, Erik Ralske, Javier Gandara
- Oboe, English horn – Ryan Walsh
- Percussion – Erik Charlston
- Piano – Bill Mays
- Trombone – Demian Austin, John Romero, Nick Schwartz, Paul Pollard
- Trumpet – Matt Mead, Ray Riccomini
- Tuba – Andy Bove
- Viola – Adrienne Sommerville, Celia Hatton, Danielle Farina, Desiree Elsevier, Irene Breslaw, Junah Chung, Ken Mirkin, Natalia Lipkina, Shmuel Katz, Will Frampton
- Violin – Ann Lehmann, Annaliesa Place, Arnaud Sussmann, Cathy Sim, Derek Ratzenboeck, Liz Lim, Emily Popham, Emma Sutton, Joanna Maurer, Joyce Hammann, Kelly Cho, Krzysztof Kuznik, Laura Lutzke, Lisa Kim, Matt Lehmann, Michael Roth, Ming Hsin, Nanae Iwata, Peter Bahng, Ragga Petursdottir, Robin Zeh, Sarah Pratt, Sein Ryu, Shan Jiang, Sharon Yamada, Suzanne Ornstein, Tallie Brunfelt, Wen Qian, Yurika Mok
