= Mark Frost =

American novelist, screenwriter, and film and television producer (born 1953)

- Born: November 25, 1953 (age 72); Brooklyn, New York City, U.S.
- Education: Carnegie Mellon University (BFA)
- Occupations: Novelist; screenwriter; film producer; television producer; director
- Spouse: Lynn Frost
- Children: 1
- Relatives: Warren Frost (father); Scott Frost (brother); Lindsay Frost (sister); Lucas Giolito (nephew)
- Writing career
- Pen name: Eric Bowman (Note: Before I Wake was published under the pseudonym Eric Bowman.)
- Years active: 1975–present
- Genres: Mystery; supernatural
- Subject: American sports history
- Notable works: Twin Peaks; Hill Street Blues; The List of Seven; The Six Messiahs
- Website: bymarkfrost.com

Mark Frost (born November 25, 1953) is an American novelist, screenwriter, television producer, film producer and director. He is best known as the co-creator of the surrealist mystery horror drama television series Twin Peaks (1990–1991, 2017) which won a Golden Globe Award in 1990. He was also a writer and executive story editor of the police drama series Hill Street Blues (1982–1985). He also directed the 1992 film Storyville. He has also published novels beginning with The List of Seven (1993) as well as several non-fiction works, including The Greatest Game Ever Played (2002), which was adapted as a 2005 film.

== Early life ==
Mark Frost was born on November 25, 1953 in Brooklyn, New York City, to Mary Virginia Calhoun and actor Warren Frost. He is the elder brother of actress Lindsay Frost and writer and photographer Scott Frost. During his childhood, Frost was raised in Los Angeles, California, and spent his adolescence in Minneapolis, Minnesota, where he attended Marshall-University High School. As a high-school student, he spent two years on an internship program studying and working at Minneapolis' Guthrie Theater.

Frost subsequently enrolled in Carnegie Mellon University (CMU) in Pittsburgh, Pennsylvania, studying acting, directing and playwriting. During his time in college, he worked as a member of the lighting crew on PBS' Mister Rogers' Neighborhood alongside actor Michael Keaton. Frost graduated from CMU in 1975 with a Bachelor of Fine Arts. After his graduation, he returned to the Guthrie Theater in Minneapolis, where he was a literary associate until 1978.

== Career ==
Frost was a writer for the NBC television series Hill Street Blues. He co-created the ABC television series Twin Peaks with David Lynch. The show developed from the initial setup of Lynch having been hired by Warner Bros. to develop a film based on the life of Marilyn Monroe that saw Lynch and Frost write a screenplay. While it didn't lead anywhere, they became good friends and it was Lynch who eventually got an "idea of a small-town thing", before Frost expressed interest in doing "a sort of Dickensian story about multiple lives in a contained area that could sort of go perpetually." First pitched during the 1988 Writers Guild of America strike, the show eventually premiered in 1990. They maintained control of the show for the first season but each had varying control over the second season, in which both later expressed regret at resolving the murder. The show first ended on June 10, 1991; Frost was not involved with the prequel film Twin Peaks: Fire Walk with Me (1992). They then developed On the Air, which aired from June 20 to July 4, 1992. He co-wrote and directed the film Storyville, co-wrote Fantastic Four (2005) and wrote The Greatest Game Ever Played, based on his 2002 book of the same name.

He has written several books on golf, including The Match: The Day the Game of Golf Changed Forever, about a 1956 match pitting pros Ben Hogan and Byron Nelson against amateurs Harvie Ward and Ken Venturi, and The Grand Slam, about the 1930 golf season of Bobby Jones. His fictional works include The List of Seven, The Six Messiahs, and The Second Objective.

Frost returned to co-write the third season of Twin Peaks alongside Lynch that aired in 2017.

== Personal life ==
Frost has lived in Ojai, California, since 2011 with his wife Lynn and their son, Travis.

His nephew is Major League Baseball player Lucas Giolito.

== Bibliography ==
=== Fiction ===
- The List of Seven (1993)
- The Six Messiahs (1995)
- Before I Wake (1997)
- The Second Objective (2009)
- The Paladin Prophecy (2012)
- The Paladin Prophecy 2: Alliance (2013)
- The Paladin Prophecy 3: Rogue (2015)
- The Secret History of Twin Peaks (2016)
- Twin Peaks: The Final Dossier (2017)
- The Yankee Sphinx (2026)

=== Non-fiction ===
- The Greatest Game Ever Played: A True Story (2002)
- The Grand Slam: Bobby Jones, America, and the Story of Golf (2006)
- The Match: The Day the Game of Golf Changed Forever (2007)
- Game Six: Cincinnati, Boston, and the 1975 World Series (2009)

== Filmography ==
=== Film ===
Year	Title	Credit	Notes
1987	The Believers	Writer and associate producer	Uncredited cameo: Locker Room Cop
1987	Scared Stiff	Co-writer	
1987	No Man's Land	Writer	Uncredited
1990	Nightbreed	Writer	Uncredited
1992	Twin Peaks: Fire Walk with Me	Executive producer	
1992	Storyville	Director and co-writer	
1992	Once Upon a Time	Executive producer	Documentary film
2005	Fantastic Four	Co-writer	
2005	The Greatest Game Ever Played	Writer and producer	Adaptation of Frost's book of the same name
2007	Fantastic Four: Rise of the Silver Surfer	Co-writer	

=== Television ===
Year	Title	Credit	Notes
1975	Lucas Tanner	Writer	
1975	Sunshine	Writer	
1975	The Six Million Dollar Man	Writer	2 episodes
1982	Gavilan	Writer	2 episodes
1982–1985	Hill Street Blues	Writer, story editor and executive story editor	28 episodes (as writer); 21 episodes (as story editor); 22 episodes (as executive story editor)
1986	The Equalizer	Writer	2 episodes
1990–1991	Twin Peaks	Co-creator, writer, director and executive producer	11 episodes (as writer) "Episode 7" (as director); Uncredited cameo appearances: "Pilot" (voice only) and "Episode 8"
1990	American Chronicles	Creator, writer, director and executive producer	13 episodes (as writer); Episode: "Farewell to the Flesh" (as director)
1992	On the Air	Co-creator, writer and executive producer	2 episodes (as writer)
1998	The Repair Shop	Creator, writer and executive producer	Unaired pilot
1998	Buddy Faro	Creator, writer and executive producer	11 episodes (as writer)
1999	Forbidden Island	Writer and executive producer	Unaired pilot
2000	The Deadly Look of Love	Co-writer and co-executive producer	Television film
2001	All Souls	Writer and executive producer	Episode: "Bad Blood"
2017	Twin Peaks: The Return	Co-creator, co-writer and executive producer	18 episodes Cameo: "Part 15"

== Accolades ==
Bram Stoker Awards

Year	Nominated work	Category	Result	Ref.
2017	Twin Peaks	Superior Achievement in a Screenplay (for "Part 8")	Nominated	

Deauville American Film Festival

Year	Nominated work	Category	Result	Ref.
1992	Storyville	Prix de la Critique Internationale (International Critics Award)	Nominated	

Golden Globe Awards

Year	Nominated work	Category	Result	Ref.
1991	Twin Peaks	Best Television Series – Drama	Won	

Primetime Emmy Awards

Year	Nominated work	Category	Result	Ref.
1984	Hill Street Blues	Outstanding Writing for a Drama Series (for "Grace Under Pressure")	Nominated	
1990	Twin Peaks	Outstanding Drama Series	Nominated	
1990	Twin Peaks	Outstanding Writing for a Drama Series (for "Pilot")	Nominated	
2018	Twin Peaks	Outstanding Writing for a Limited Series, Movie or a Dramatic Special	Nominated	

The Stinkers Bad Movie Awards

Year	Nominated work	Category	Result	Ref.
2005	Fantastic Four	Worst Screenplay for a Film Grossing More Than $100 Million	Won	

Writers Guild of America Awards

Year	Nominated work	Category	Result	Ref.
1985	Hill Street Blues	Episodic Drama (for "Grace Under Pressure")	Won	
1985	Hill Street Blues	Episodic Drama (for "Death by Kiki")	Nominated	
1985	Hill Street Blues	Episodic Drama (for "Parting Is Such Sweep Sorrow")	Nominated	
