= Episode 2 (Twin Peaks) =

- Twin Peaks episode
- Dale Cooper's dream of Laura Palmer and The Man from Another Place in the Black Lodge featuring backwards speech and a mysterious shadow moving along the wall.
- Episode no.: Season 1 Episode 3
- Directed by: David Lynch
- Written by: David Lynch; Mark Frost
- Production code: 1.002
- Original air date: April 19, 1990
- Running time: 48 minutes

Guest appearances
- Grace Zabriskie as Sarah Palmer; David Patrick Kelly as Jerry Horne; Miguel Ferrer as Special Agent Albert Rosenfield; Victoria Catlin as Blackie O'Reilly; Wendy Robie as Nadine Hurley; Kimmy Robertson as Lucy Moran; Jan D'Arcy as Sylvia Horne; Mary Jo Deschanel as Eileen Hayward; Gary Hershberger as Mike Nelson; Michael J. Anderson as The Man from Another Place; Robert Bauer as Johnny Horne; Frank Silva as Killer BOB; Al Strobel as "The One-Armed Man"

Episode chronology
← Previous "Episode 1"	Next → "Episode 3"

"Episode 2", also known as "Zen, or the Skill to Catch a Killer", (Note: Although the series originally did not have episode titles, when it was broadcast in Germany the episodes were given titles that are now used by some fans and critics.) is the third episode of the first season of the American television series Twin Peaks. The episode was written by series creators David Lynch and Mark Frost, and directed by Lynch. It features series regulars Kyle MacLachlan, Michael Ontkean, Ray Wise and Richard Beymer; and introduces Michael J. Anderson as The Man from Another Place, Miguel Ferrer as Albert Rosenfield and David Patrick Kelly as Jerry Horne.

Twin Peaks centers on the investigation into the murder of schoolgirl Laura Palmer (Sheryl Lee), in the small rural town in Washington state after which the series is named. In this episode, Federal Bureau of Investigation agent Dale Cooper (MacLachlan) tells Sheriff Truman (Ontkean) and his deputies about a unique method of narrowing down the suspects in Palmer's death. Meanwhile, Cooper's cynical colleague Albert Rosenfield (Ferrer) arrives in town, and Cooper has a strange dream that elevates the murder investigation to a new level.

"Episode 2" was first broadcast on April 19, 1990, on the American Broadcasting Company (ABC) network, and was watched by an audience of 19.2 million households in the United States, equating to roughly 21 percent of the available audience. "Episode 2" has been well-received since its initial broadcast, and is regarded by critics as a ground-breaking television episode. It has since influenced, and been parodied by, several subsequent television series. Academic readings of the episode have highlighted its depiction of heuristic, a priori knowledge, and the sexual undertones of several characters' actions.

== Plot ==
=== Background ===
The small fictional town of Twin Peaks, Washington, has been shocked by the murder of schoolgirl Laura Palmer (Sheryl Lee) and the attempted murder of her classmate Ronette Pulaski (Phoebe Augustine). Federal Bureau of Investigation special agent Dale Cooper (Kyle MacLachlan) has come to the town to investigate, and initial suspicion has fallen upon Palmer's boyfriend Bobby Briggs (Dana Ashbrook) and the man with whom she was cheating on Briggs, James Hurley (James Marshall). However, other inhabitants of the town have their own suspicions: the violent, drug-dealing truck driver Leo Johnson (Eric Da Re) is seen as a possible suspect.

=== Events ===
The Horne family—Ben (Richard Beymer), Audrey (Sherilyn Fenn), and Johnny (Robert Bauer)—are eating dinner when they are interrupted by Ben's brother Jerry (David Patrick Kelly). The brothers share brie and butter baguettes while Ben tells Jerry of Laura Palmer's murder and the failing of the Ghostwood project. They decide to visit One Eyed Jacks, a casino and brothel across the Canada–US border, where Ben wins a coin flip to determine who will be the first to sleep with the newest prostitute.

Bobby Briggs and Mike Nelson (Gary Hershberger) drive into the woods to pick up a hidden delivery of cocaine, but are ambushed by Leo Johnson, who demands the $10,000 the pair owe him. Leo also hints that he suspects someone has been sleeping with his wife Shelly (Mädchen Amick), then scares the pair off. When Bobby visits Shelly at her home the next day, he discovers that Leo has beaten her.

Dale Cooper receives a phone call from Hawk (Michael Horse) about a one-armed man seen at Ronette Pulaski's hospital bed. The next morning, Cooper gathers together Sheriff Truman (Michael Ontkean), Deputies Hawk and Brennan (Harry Goaz), and Lucy Moran (Kimmy Robertson) in a forest clearing to demonstrate his unusual approach to eliminating suspects from their investigation. As each suspect's name is read from a list, Cooper throws a stone at a bottle placed 60 feet 6 inches (18.44 m) away. Each time he hits the bottle with a stone, he considers the previous name read out to be of interest to the case. The method points his suspicion at Leo Johnson and psychiatrist Lawrence Jacoby (Russ Tamblyn). Dale's fellow FBI agent Albert Rosenfield (Miguel Ferrer) arrives later at the Sheriff's office and immediately causes friction with Truman.

Audrey speaks with Donna Hayward (Lara Flynn Boyle) at the Double R Diner, before dancing to a song she puts in the jukebox, saying, "God, I love this music. Isn't it too dreamy?"

James Hurley and Donna discuss their new relationship, and kiss passionately on Donna's sofa. Elsewhere, Leland Palmer (Ray Wise), still mourning Laura's death, dances in his living room, sobbing and holding a portrait of Laura as he does so. He breaks open the picture's frame, cutting his hands, as his wife Sarah (Grace Zabriskie) screams at him to stop.

Cooper retires to bed at his hotel room, and experiences a strange dream featuring the one-armed man, who identifies himself as Mike, and BOB, who vows to "kill again". Cooper then dreams he is in a room hung with red curtains. The Man from Another Place (Michael J. Anderson) and Laura Palmer speak to him in a jarring and disjointed manner, before Laura leans over to whisper in his ear. Cooper wakes up, telephones Harry, and declares that he knows who the murderer is.

== Production ==
Everybody's had that experience, like having a conversation under the influence of something late at night. You reach a point where you seem to know something. And the next morning, it's either absurd or you've forgotten it ... It was a little bit of an opening into something that was mysterious and tantalizing.

— David Lynch on the episode's red herring ending, in 2005.

"Episode 2" was the second episode of the series to have been directed by series creator David Lynch, who had also helmed "Pilot", and would direct a further four episodes during Twin Peaks' initial run. The episode was written by both Lynch and co-creator Mark Frost; the pair had co-written the prior two episodes. Frost would pen a further eight scripts for the series after "Episode 2", while Lynch would write just one episode—the second season opening installment, "Episode 8".

"Episode 2" introduces the character of The Man from Another Place, played by Michael J. Anderson. The Red Room seen in the episode's final scene was created from scratch by Lynch for the European release of "Pilot", and was not originally intended to be a part of the American series. Lynch was so pleased with the result that he decided to incorporate it into the regular series. The Red Room would later be revealed as a waiting room for an unknown thing. a mystical dimension bordering the town of Twin Peaks. Lynch claims to have conceived most of the sequence while leaning against his car on a cold night while its chassis was hot, and free-associating ideas. The director first met Anderson in 1987 while continuing work on Ronnie Rocket, a planned film project about "electricity and a three-foot guy with red hair" which was ultimately scrapped. He thought of Anderson immediately upon conceiving the Black Lodge.

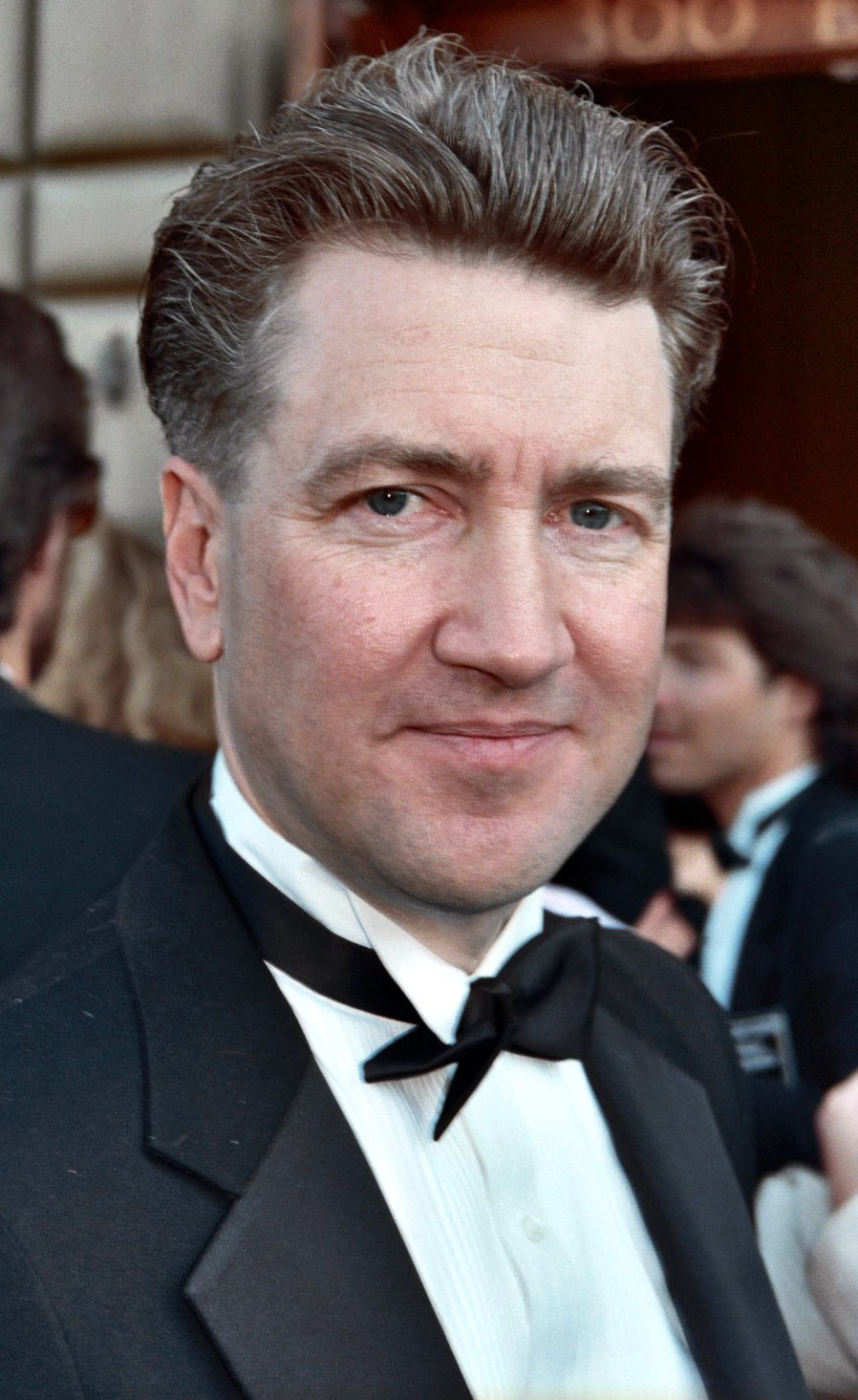
Lynch conceived the episode's visuals while working on the unfinished Ronnie Rocket.

Miguel Ferrer, who made his first appearance as Albert Rosenfield in this episode, had met Lynch while working on another film project that was also never made. Lynch remembered Ferrer when casting Twin Peaks, and sent him the scripts for both "Episode 1" and "Episode 2". Ferrer found the scripts difficult to understand until Frost gave him a recording of "Pilot", which cleared up the actor's confusion.

Dialogue heard in the dream sequence uses a distinctive reversed manner of speech. This was achieved by recording the actors' line phonetically reversed, and playing this audio backwards. David Lynch had begun experimenting with the technique in 1971, and had originally planned to use it in his 1977 debut feature, Eraserhead, before it finally found use in this episode. Describing the process of learning his lines backwards, Anderson notes that he first worked out the phonemes of each word rather than simply reading it back to front, and disregarded the inflection of any given word as this helped bolster the discordant effect of the end result. The reversed audio was also altered with a slight reverb effect. The actors were required to perform their movements backwards, as elements of the scene would be reversed entirely.

Frank Byers, the episode's director of photography, has stated that the chief inspiration for his choice to use wide-angle lenses and soft lighting throughout the episode was the 1958 Orson Welles film Touch of Evil. Byers also eschewed the use of additional lighting beyond that which he felt was necessary, and chose to work mainly with the natural light of the location or set in question, and to light the scene from the floor when additional light was needed. The location used for One Eyed Jacks appeared in only one other episode of the series after its appearance here, with footage for both filmed on the same day. When the setting was revisited in the series' second season, a set was built to represent another part of the building instead. The female cast members were deliberately lit with soft lighting from a close range, as this helped to create a "veneer of innocence and comfort".

Kimmy Robertson—who plays sheriff's office receptionist Lucy Moran—has described Lynch's directorial style as hypnotic, finding that his question-and-answer approach of discussing scenes with the cast was unique among directors she had worked with. Robertson also noted that during the filming of Cooper's stone-throwing, Lynch "sat [the cast] down and told Kyle he was going to hit the bottle ... Kyle hit it, and everybody freaked out. It was like David used the power of the universe".

== Themes ==
Scenes in "Episode 2"—especially the rock-throwing scene in the forest—have been cited as introducing a spiritual side to the character of Dale Cooper, which would also be expounded in the later "Episode 16". Simon Riches, in an essay included in The Philosophy of David Lynch, has noted that the Red Room dream sequence is an example of the difficulty in rationalizing a priori knowledge—the "lack of empirical evidence that ... a faculty of intuition exists" in the mind is here represented by the "nonphysical", dreamlike Red Room. Cooper's heuristic approach "pointedly avoids the routine deductive apparat of logic, clues or muscle". The fact that the series' protagonist embraces this intuitive manner of deduction sets Twin Peaks "at odds with the naturalistic trend in analytic philosophy". This dreamlike approach is a hallmark of Lynch, who, according to Greg Olson in his book Beautiful Dark, "has always identified himself as an artist first, a man fascinated by spiritual realms who's committed to expressing his inner life".

The episode's reliance on surrealism has also been seen as symptomatic of "a broader move away from social realism within television drama". The episode makes use of strong color cues and unusual camera angles—in particular, Helen Wheatley, author of Gothic Television, describes the brown color palette and low-angle shots used to frame certain characters as creating "a mood of domestic terror." Palmer's dance while holding his daughter's picture has been seen as "a time-honored metaphor for marriage", an "incestuous roundelay" which hints towards his abusive past. Both incest and violent sexuality would become recurring themes for the series, examples of which include Palmer's later murder and possible molestation of his niece Maddy and Benjamin Horne's unwitting brush with incest with his masked daughter in the One-Eyed Jacks brothel.

== Broadcast and reception ==
"Episode 2" first aired on the ABC Network on April 19, 1990. The initial broadcast was viewed by 12.1 million households in the United States—which represented 21 percent of the available audience and 13.1 percent of all households in the country. (Note: Viewing figures are based on the ratings given by the Nielsen Company—each ratings point represents one percent of all households in the United States during the year the series was broadcast; for 1990 a single point represented 921,000 households.) This represented a drop in viewing figures from the previous episode, "Episode 1", which was seen by 14.9 million households, or 27 percent of the available audience. The broadcast inspired several complaints about the sexual overtones of the scene in which the characters of Ben and Jerry Horne eat baguette sandwiches.

The episode has been well-received critically. Writing for The Boston Globe, Gail Caldwell compared Lynch and Frost's script for the episode to the works of mid-20th century American writers Sherwood Anderson, Flannery O'Connor and Truman Capote, describing it as an "excavation of the fear and madness poised behind an ordinary small-town veneer". Caldwell also praised Lynch's direction, finding that several of the episode's "nerve-wracking" scenes lasted just the right amount of time to be effective, and noting that "the line between confronting the abyss and exploiting it is one Lynch walks again and again". Writing for The A.V. Club, Keith Phipps rated the episode an A, calling it "one of the most peculiar hours of television ever to air on a network". He praised the episode's portrayal of the Black Lodge, called the dream sequence "some of the most disquieting filmmaking Lynch has ever done", and described its depiction as "a weirdly All-American supernatural system" that seems "completely terrifying". Fellow A.V. Club writer Noel Murray felt that the episode pushed "into previously unexplored television territory", and that the climactic Black Lodge dream sequence came to be seen as "the signature moment in the entirety of Twin Peaks". Den of Geek's Doralba Picerno has called the episode "truly groundbreaking TV material", noting the use of "surreal imagery with its roots in psychoanalysis".

Writing for AllMovie, Andrea LeVasseur rated the episode four out of five stars, called it "memorable and pivotal", and described the Red Room dream as "unforgettable". Jen Chaney, writing for The Washington Post, has called the episode "the best in the series". Chaney described it, and the dream sequence specifically, as having "turned Twin Peaks into a water-cooler phenomenon", and noted that it may have inspired later series such as The Sopranos and Lost to "feel comfortable taking risks with their audience". The Washington Post's Tom Shales has described the dream sequence as "the scene that separated the men from the boys", noting that it further polarized the series' audience, attracting loyal viewers and putting off others. The sequence, and the episode as a whole, attracted negative criticism from The Boston Globe's Ed Siegel, who felt that the series "lost its magic" by this point. Siegel added that "anyone with less than a semester's worth of either Postminimalism 101 or Absurdism 102 can come up with dancing dwarves, one-armed men, psychic detectives, psycho killers, llamas in the waiting room and hints of incest and necrophilia", and felt that a reliance on surrealism made Lynch seem to be a "one trick pony".

The episode's ending was parodied in "Who Shot Mr. Burns?", a 1996 two-part episode of The Simpsons, in which Dale Cooper and The Man from Another Place were replaced by the characters of Chief Wiggum and Lisa Simpson, respectively. The backwards speech and unexplained shadow moving across a wall were included in the parody, which takes place in a detailed recreation of the Black Lodge.
