= That's So Raven season 4 =

That's So Raven
- Season 4
- Starring: Raven; Orlando Brown; Kyle Massey; Anneliese van der Pol; Rondell Sheridan
- No. of episodes: 22

Release
- Original network: Disney Channel
- Original release: February 20, 2006 – November 10, 2007

Season chronology
- ← Previous; Season 3

The fourth and final season of That's So Raven aired on Disney Channel from February 20, 2006 to November 10, 2007. This season ultimately became the final season of the show. Following T'Keyah Crystal Keymáh's departure from the show in the third season as Tanya Baxter, the Baxter family now consists of Raven Baxter (Raven-Symoné), Cory Baxter (Kyle Massey), and Victor Baxter (Rondell Sheridan). Anneliese van der Pol and Orlando Brown reprise their roles as Chelsea Daniels and Eddie Thomas respectively.

After a record-breaking third season, season four continued to accomplish many firsts for Disney Channel. It reached 100 episodes with its series finale on November 10, 2007, a record which was met on October 7, 2011 with Wizards of Waverly Place's 100th episode. There would be a continuity-error regarding the final three episodes, since they aired after the spinoff, Cory in the House, premiered on January 12, 2007 with Cory and Victor moving to Washington, D.C.

Guest stars for this season included: Rose Abdoo, Candace Cameron Bure, Rae Dawn Chong, Ashley Eckstein, Jasmine Guy, Sammi Hanratty, David Henrie, Richard Horvitz, Steve Hytner, Anne-Marie Johnson, Phill Lewis, Spencer Locke, Brooke Lyons, Kathy Najimy, Geoffrey Owens, Sydney Park, Tim Reid, Karly Rothenberg, Jodi Shilling, Maria Shriver, Cole and Dylan Sprouse, Bobb'e J. Thompson, Tiffany Thornton, Dorien Wilson, Annie Wood and Amy Yasbeck.

== Production ==
Raven-Symoné is credited as one of the show's producers.

== Cast ==
- Raven-Symoné as Raven Baxter
- Orlando Brown as Eddie Thomas
- Kyle Massey as Cory Baxter
- Anneliese van der Pol as Chelsea Daniels
- Rondell Sheridan as Victor Baxter

== Production staff ==
- Marc Warren - executive producer
- Dennis Rinsler - executive producer
- Michael Carrington - co-executive producer
- Michael Feldman - supervising producer
- Al Sonja Rice - consulting producer
- Patty Gary Cox - co-executive producer
- Raven-Symoné - producer

== Episodes ==
No. overall	No. in season	Title	Directed by	Written by	Original release date	Prod. code	U.S. viewers (millions)
79	1	"Raven, Sydney and the Man"	Rich Correll	Marc Warren	February 20, 2006	403	4.5
Raven, Chelsea, and Eddie volunteer to run clubs for Mrs. Valentine's class at the Community Center. While there, Raven must deal with mentoring an obnoxious little girl named Sydney. Raven finds out that Sydney never knew her real parents, and eventually they grow a sisterly bond. Guest stars: David Henrie as Larry, Sydney Park as Sydney, Karly Rothenberg as Mrs. Valentine
80	2	"Pin Pals"	Rich Correll	Dennis Rinsler	February 24, 2006	401	N/A
The episode begins with Victor talking to Raven and Cory about taking responsibility in the Baxter house since Tanya is in England. Raven must choose between going with Chelsea and Eddie for a bowling tournament, or sneaking into world-famous fashion designer Donna Cabonna's (Anne-Marie Johnson) fashion show to show off her designs. She chooses to go to the fashion show, and ends up "saving the night"...before she destroys it. She then becomes an intern for Donna Cabonna. In this episode, it is revealed that Raven's mother, Tanya Baxter, left to study law in England. Guest stars: Anne-Marie Johnson as Donna Cabonna, Jodi Shilling as Tiffany, Shon Little as Chef Heimlich
81	3	"Dues and Don'ts"	Rich Correll	Theresa Akana & Stacee Comage	March 3, 2006	404	N/A
Raven has a vision that she will get an awesome office on her first day at work as an intern for Donna Cabonna (Anne-Marie Johnson), and she decides to brag about it. Muffy doubts Raven's words and Chelsea later invites Muffy, Señorita Rodriguez, and the entire Spanish class, much to Raven's dismay. Raven arrives at her first day of work and finds out her "private office" is actually Donna's office room. Cory and Eddie accidentally destroyed the kitchen after they were brawling over a ticket. When Raven's unexpected visitors threaten to ruin Donna's office room and Raven kicks them out, but not before knocking Donna's prized sculpture off the center. Donna returns and Raven tries to hide the tilted art from her. Tiffany unexpectedly "saves the day" by accidentally breaking the farday sculpture and therefore taking the heat from Donna. Guest stars: Ashley Drane as Muffy, Rose Abdoo as Señorita Rodriguez, Anne-Marie Johnson as Donna Cabonna, Jodi Shilling as Tiffany Absent: Rondell Sheridan as Victor Baxter
82	4	"Unhappy Medium"	Rich Correll	Josh Lynn & Danny Warren	March 17, 2006	407	N/A
Teen actress Nikki Logan (Brooke Lyons) arrives at Bayside High School to shoot a new movie. But when Raven has a vision that Nikki's going to choke from eating taffy, she saves her from it. She asks Raven how she knows this will occurs, but when she says she is a psychic, Nikki reveals she's playing a psychic character in the new movie and asks that if Raven would mind giving her pointers. Raven is happy to help, as it also means joining Nikki's circle. Due to some expired orange juice, Raven has a reaction that leads Nikki to think that Raven's trying to talk to the dead. Raven explains that her visions don't come all the time and that, aside from having “occasional visions that may or may not come true,” she is still a regular teenager. This disappoints Nikki and she leaves. Raven later invites Nikki back and she pantomimes having an over-the-top fake vision, using quotes from various movies. Nikki believes this will be her ticket to being taken seriously, thanks Raven and says that if her performance is met with positive reviews, she'll allow Raven to come along to her Malibu estate. As Nikki leaves, Raven then has a vision that Nikki's performance will cause her to be fired on the set. Worried about her vision, Raven starts planning how to save Nikki from being axed. During the middle of filming, with Nikki doing Raven's "performance" Raven attempts to warn her on the set, but it turns out that Raven is mistaken for an extra and is the one fired. Nikki later reveals that she lied to Raven about bringing her to Malibu, leaving Raven heartbroken at how shallow Nikki really is. Then Raven has a third vision that Nikki's performance will be met with scathing reviews, so much that her beach house in Malibu will be taken away. Since Raven thinks Nikki deserves it, she doesn't tell her. Guest stars: Brooke Lyons as Nikki Logan, Sam Rubin as himself, Amanda Tepe as Becky, Ryan Yu as Toshi Nakamora
83	5	"Adventures in Boss-Sitting"	Eric Dean Seaton	Jessica Lopez	March 24, 2006	406	N/A
Donna Cabonna makes Raven her temporary assistant while Tiffany is out of town. Devon returns to San Francisco for one night and Raven is planning on a romantic date, but Donna shows up at Raven's doorstep in tears because her boyfriend Teddy (Richard Horvitz) broke up with her. Raven must juggle both Devon and Donna, running up and down the stairs, catering to Donna's every whim while trying to have a nice night with Devon. Donna breaks down again, and Cocoa runs down the stairs with the head of a bear that Devon got Raven. Devon finds out that Raven has been hiding Donna upstairs, and gets angry and breaks up with Raven. Meanwhile, Cory goes on a date with a girl named Brittany. At the movie he sees Cindy, his ex-girlfriend, who is also on a date with a boy. The date doesn't turn out all that well, and Cory finds himself wanting to get back together with Cindy. Cindy, Devon, and Teddy, all come to the door and each relationship is rekindled. The next day at work, Raven sees Tiffany and is happy that she's here, telling her what happened. However, Tiffany deliberately didn't tell her that Donna and Teddy play "break up and make up" every weekend. Raven gets angry as Tiffany smugly goes to sit on her chair, unbeknownst to her, Raven had put a bowl of yogurt there for Donna. Raven tries to warn her, but doesn't after Tiffany answers with attitude. Special guest star: Jonathan McDaniel as Devon Guest stars: Anne-Marie Johnson as Donna Cabonna, Jodi Shilling as Tiffany, Jordyn Colemon as Cindy, Richard Horvitz as Teddy Absent: Rondell Sheridan as Victor Baxter
84	6	"Hook Up My Space"	Rich Correll	Michael Feldman	March 31, 2006	408	3.1
Raven feels that her room is not big enough. When she gets a vision of Cory asking Victor if he can move his band to the basement, Raven interrupts her brother. She gets to Victor first. This makes Cory furious, and he uses the television makeover show Hook Up My Space to make Raven's room just how she hates it, instead of the way she wants it. Even though Raven is embarrassed on national television, Cory later makes over her new room exactly how she wants it, Chelsea accidentally puts the big paper at Raven on the wall. Meanwhile, Victor and Eddie decide they need to work out after finding it too hard to lift a box of Raven's stuffed animals and pillows. This leads them to move Victor's old weights up to Raven's old room to exercise. Guest stars: Steve Truitt as Sly Huffington
85	7	"Driving Miss Lazy"	Eric Dean Seaton	Michael Carrington	April 21, 2006	405	N/A
Eddie, gets his driver's license, and he decides to buy a car with Raven and Chelsea. Raven and Chelsea boss Eddie around by creating a "voting" system—tilted in their favor—and even painting their beloved car pink. After being their valet for too long, Eddie takes a drive to the countryside by himself. Sheriff Jefferson (Tim Reid) arrests Eddie on suspicion of being "The Pink Bandit", who is responsible for a string of recent burglaries in the area. Eddie enlists Raven's help, and she uses a disguise to assist her friend. Back at home, Stanley sells Cory cologne that he says will attract girls, but it turns out to attract dogs. Special guest star: Tim Reid as Sheriff Jefferson Guest stars: Bobb'e J. Thompson as Stanley Absent: Rondell Sheridan as Victor Baxter Note: Orlando Brown also played The Pink Bandit
86	8	"Be Prepared"	Debbie Allen	Marc Warren	May 12, 2006	413	N/A
Raven agrees to help her boss, Donna Cabonna, shoot a public service announcement commercial/music video about emergency preparedness. Raven gets boy band Boyz 'N Motion to shoot the video, but the trio begin to turn against each other, and then break up. Raven and the others start to panic when the alarm in the office goes off, and they do not know how to exit the building safely. Then-First Lady of California Maria Shriver guest stars. Special guest star: Maria Shriver as herself Guest stars: Columbus Short as Trey, Michael Copon as Ricky, Ryan Hansen as J.J., Anne-Marie Johnson as Donna Cabonna, Jodi Shilling as Tiffany
87	9	"Juicer Consequences"	Rich Correll	Michael Feldman	June 24, 2006	402	N/A
Raven and Chelsea get into an argument when Chelsea asserts that Raven only thinks about herself, and never listens to others. Meanwhile, Cory starts junior high school, and becomes a business partner with a bully named "The Juicer". Cory’s pleas to Raven for advice on how to deal with The Juicer fall on deaf ears, confirming Chelsea’s accusations. Raven finally realizes Cory is in trouble when she has a vision where Cory gets “juiced.” She must warn Cory at his junior high school, but in order to do so, she disguises herself as a cafeteria lunch lady. Guest stars: David Henrie as Larry, Dan Mott as The Juicer Absent: Orlando Brown as Eddie Thomas
88	10	"Sister Act"	Marc Warren	Michael Feldman	July 8, 2006	412	3.5
Raven and Sydney enter a beauty pageant "Little Miss and her Big Sis" to raise money for the Community Center. Things get personal when Muffy and her younger sister, Buffy, also enter the pageant. This causes Raven and Muffy to become too competitive, leading to everyone in the room quarreling—even Chelsea, Eddie, Stanley, Cory, Victor, and the audience. When Raven has a vision of Sydney releasing the rope that holds a giant globe that will fall on Buffy during the fight, she stops everyone from fighting. However, Raven, Sidney, Muffy and Buffy are immediately disqualified for starting a fight. Guest stars: Bobb'e J. Thompson as Stanley, Ashley Drane as Muffy, Rachel Fox as Buffy, Sydney Park as Sydney, Karly Rothenberg as Mrs. Valentine, Buddy Lewis as Father
89	11	"Checkin' Out" (Note: Part 1 of "That's So Suite Life of Hannah Montana")	Rich Correll	Story by : Michael Carrington; Teleplay by : Edward C. Evans & Al Sonja L. Rice	July 28, 2006	422	5.7
Raven must organize an important photo-shoot for Donna Cabonna at the Tipton Hotel in Boston, however she messes up when she lands Pistache in Milan, Italy and the models still stuck halfway around the world in Budaprogoslovakia. However things turn to worst when Raven's Secretec's alarm has the wrong time so she misses her flight back to San Francisco. Meanwhile, Eddie and Cory use Chelsea's paddleballs to get money by having her break records. They think that it will be easy, until the defending paddleball champion—Stanley—shows up. Special guest stars: Jasmine Guy as Pistache, Dylan and Cole Sprouse as Zack and Cody Martin, Phill Lewis as Mr. Moseby Guest stars: Anne-Marie Johnson as Donna Cabonna, Bobb'e J. Thompson as Stanley, Annie Wood as Sandra Blair, Tiffany Thornton as Tyler Sparks Note: This was a crossover with The Suite Life of Zack & Cody and Hannah Montana. This is the last episode produced for the series.
90	12	"Fur Better or Worse"	Eric Dean Seaton	Deborah Swisher	August 4, 2006	410	N/A
Raven shows Donna Cabonna her sketches for their new fall clothing line. Donna likes her designs, but thinks that they would be better with a fur collar on them. Raven quickly tells her best friend, Chelsea, about her "good news". Chelsea, along with her Friendly Earth Society Club members, protest the use of real animal fur in clothing, resulting Raven and Chelsea's friendship turning sour. Meanwhile, Stanley creates—and sells—a gadget to Eddie and Cory that uses pick-up lines to attract women. What Stanley didn't tell them that it didn't attract women, but it hit on them, thus resulting in Eddie being whacked by women with purses. Guest stars: Anne-Marie Johnson as Donna Cabonna, Bobb'e J. Thompson as Stanley, Jodi Shilling as Tiffany, Fred Meyers as Leaf, Ashley-Nicole Sherman as Jamaican Girl
91	13	"Mad Hot Cotillion"	Rich Correll	Michael Carrington	August 11, 2006	415	N/A
Cory gives advice about getting girls to "The Juicer", who has his eyes on a beautiful new transfer student, Kayla. "The Juicer" gets angry when he finds out she really likes Cory. Meanwhile, Raven is grounded for a week for being late for her great aunt's 80th birthday celebration (following a vision of Chelsea and Eddie needing help in a Mexican restaurant), and she quickly goes mad from loneliness. Guest stars: David Henrie as Larry, Dan Mott as The Juicer, Spencer Locke as Kayla, Amy Tolsky as Mrs. Rothschild
92	14	"When 6021 Met 4267"	Eric Dean Seaton	Dennis Rinsler	August 18, 2006 (Note: This episode was first released in Raven's Makeover Madness DVD on July 18, 2006.)	411	3.5
When Raven is having a party, she can't find a date to go with, so she uses the school's internet dating service to find out a compatible match. Raven finds out her true soul mate is Eddie, and then has a vision that their lives will be horrible when they grow up if they stay together. Because of this, she breaks up with Eddie. During the party they share a kiss, in which they seem to feel no spark from. In the last scene they share one more kiss, and there they both deny any feeling of a spark, but both of them end up showing that they liked the kiss and may have feelings for each other even though they decided to just be friends. Guest stars: Bobb'e J. Thompson as Stanley, Ben Ziff as Danny, Andrea Edwards as Loca Note: In this episode, Raven has a vision that she and Eddie are married and have twins. Raven does go on to have twins as seen in the show's spin-off Raven's Home, however, Devon is the father, not Eddie.
93	15	"Soup to Nuts"	Rich Correll	Story by : Michael Feldman; Teleplay by : Dennis Rinsler & Marc Warren	August 25, 2006	421	4.3
Raven hurts Principal Stuckerman, sending him to the hospital. She has a vision that Stuckerman is going to retire the next day, so she tries to avoid him the whole day by playing sick. Her grandma's soup causes her to have strange dreams, placing her in strange situations. Guest stars: Steve Hytner as Dr. Stuckerman
94	16	"Members Only"	Rich Correll	Theresa Akana & Stacee Comage	September 15, 2006	414	N/A
Raven and Chelsea pretend to be Eddie's girlfriends, so he can get into a hot new club called "The Sigmas". Things get ugly when the club's leaders, Dylan and Jordan, find out that Eddie is scamming them. Meanwhile, Cory and Victor try to find a cricket that Cory accidentally lets loose in the house. Guest stars: B. J. Britt as Dylan, Colin Kim as Jordan
95	17	"The Ice Girl Cometh"	Rich Correll	Al Sonja L. Rice	September 22, 2006	409	N/A
Chelsea and her mother (Amy Yasbeck) invite Raven to join them on a mother/daughter retreat that they have every year since Tanya is in England. Raven initially cringes at that idea, but when she has a vision of meeting a cute guy named Brent, she quickly changes her mind. Meanwhile, Cory's band, "Cory and the Boys", takes drastic action to get radio DJ Mitch (Dorien Wilson), Victor's old friend, to get their music played on the radio. Special guest star: Amy Yasbeck as Joni Daniels Guest stars: David Henrie as Larry, Frankie Ryan Manriquez as William, Dorien Wilson as Mitch
96	18	"Rae of Sunshine"	Eric Dean Seaton	Lanny Horn	October 6, 2006	418	N/A
Raven unwittingly hosts a slumber party at her house for Sydney's new club, the local Bayside Sunshine Girls, and everything turns into a complete disaster. Meanwhile, Cory takes Eddie and Chelsea to the movies, and has to deal with their loudness. Despite Eddie and Chelsea making all the noise, it is Cory who gets kicked out of the theater for being too loud. Guest stars: Sydney Park as Sydney, Karly Rothenberg as Mrs. Valentine, Rachel Fox as Buffy, Sammi Hanratty as Taylor, Johari Johnson as Movie Usher Absent: Rondell Sheridan as Victor Baxter
97	19	"The Dress is Always Greener"	Eric Dean Seaton	Deborah Swisher	November 25, 2006	416	N/A
Raven is getting very annoyed with Donna Cabonna because she wants to be a fashion designer, not a maid. Then, Donna's ex-best friend (but now arch-enemy), Lora Stelladora (Kathy Najimy), moves into the office upstairs, and offers Raven a job as a fashion designer. Raven quickly finds that she has to deal with two bosses. Meanwhile, Cory and Eddie try to profit on Chelsea's potato that resembles Abraham Lincoln. Special guest star: Kathy Najimy as Lora Stelladora Guest stars: Anne-Marie Johnson as Donna Cabonna, Jodi Shilling as Tiffany Note: This is Rondell Sheridan's last appearance as Victor Baxter in That's So Raven. Sheridan did however reprise his role as Victor Baxter in Cory in the House and Raven's Home.
98	20	"Teacher's Pet"	Rondell Sheridan	Al Sonja L. Rice	January 15, 2007	417	3.9
Raven's scheme to get an exam postponed gets the new, hip young history teacher fired. Meanwhile, Cory auditions girls to find a new lead singer for his band, but "The Juicer" insists that he will be the new singer because he "sings like an angel". Guest stars: Candace Cameron Bure as Courtney Dearborn, David Henrie as Larry, Frankie Ryan Manriquez as William, Dan Mott as The Juicer, Curtis William Jr. as Dorian, Steve Hytner as Dr. Stuckerman Note: This episode—and the two episodes that follow—aired after Cory in the House had already premiered. Absent: Rondell Sheridan as Victor Baxter
99	21	"The Way We Were"	Eric Dean Seaton	Story by : Deborah Swisher; Teleplay by : Theresa Akana & Stacee Comage	March 2, 2007	420	3.5
Raven and Chelsea throw Eddie a surprise birthday party, and invite both of his divorced parents (Geoffrey Owens and Rae Dawn Chong), who—Eddie suspects—will get back together. However, Eddie quickly finds out about the party from Chelsea, of course. At the party, Eddie sings a song dedicated to his parents getting back together, unbeknownst that they weren't going to. After finding out, Eddie leaves in embarrassment. Raven has a vision that Eddie was buying a bus ticket to Albuquerque. Raven and Chelsea go to the bus station in an attempt to get on the bus Eddie was seemingly buying a ticket for, only to find that the "one way" Eddie was buying was simply a hot dog. Eddie is reassured by his parents that they will love him no matter what. Meanwhile, Cory is hired by Raven to cater for the party, as Victor was busy at the Chill Grill. So, Cory enlists Larry, William and Heimlich to help cook the food, as he oversees everything. However, they begin to strike over Cory's strictness and unfair tactics. Realizing his mistake, Cory decides to treat them better. Guest stars: Rae Dawn Chong as Lynn, Geoffrey Owens as Michael, David Henrie as Larry, Frankie Ryan Manriquez as William, Shon Little as Chef Heimlich, Dallas Henry as Stu Note: When Raven explains her vision about Eddie's parents to him, he asks "You sure you weren't just watching The Cosby Show?", on which Raven-Symoné and guest-star Geoffrey Owens were cast members. Absent: Rondell Sheridan as Victor Baxter
100	22	"Where There's Smoke"	Eric Dean Seaton	Edward C. Evans	November 10, 2007	419	5.5
Raven suspects that Cory has started smoking when she finds a pack of cigarettes in Cory's shirt pocket which gets him in trouble, but he is really hiding them from his girlfriend, Cindy, so she does not smoke them. Guest stars: David Henrie as Larry, Frankie Ryan Manriquez as William, Dan Mott as The Juicer, Jordyn Colemon as Cindy Note: This was the final episode aired for the series and due to the network airing the episodes out of production order the intended series finale aired a year prior to this episode. Absent: Rondell Sheridan as Victor Baxter
