= Audrey's Dance =

Instrumental cue by Angelo Badalamenti

- Cover of the Twin Peaks song book (1990)

Composition by Angelo Badalamenti

from the album Soundtrack from Twin Peaks
- Released: September 11, 1990
- Genre: Cool jazz
- Length: 5:15
- Label: Warner Bros.
- Composer: Angelo Badalamenti
- Producers: Angelo Badalamenti; David Lynch

"Audrey's Dance" is an instrumental musical composition by the American composer Angelo Badalamenti for the television series Twin Peaks. It is the third track on the soundtrack album Soundtrack from Twin Peaks (1990). Like the rest of the soundtrack, it was produced by both Badalamenti and show creator David Lynch. "Audrey's Dance" first appeared in the show's pilot, aired on April 8, 1990. Named after the character Audrey Horne, the song was memorably featured in "Episode 2" when Audrey dances along to the jukebox in the Double R Diner.

"Audrey's Dance" has a cool jazz style with a distinctive walking bassline, rhythmic finger snaps, and drums played with brushes. The dance shares stylistic elements and melodic motifs with other pieces from the Twin Peaks soundtrack. Several variations and alternate arrangements of the dance were used throughout the show's run. Despite its title, the dance frequently accompanied characters other than Audrey, particularly Bobby Briggs. "Audrey's Dance" was reprised in a key scene from "Part 16" of the 2017 limited revival of Twin Peaks.

== Composition ==
"Audrey's Dance" is a jazz piece in the cool jazz style. It has also been compared to lounge music. Royal S. Brown wrote that the piece has "a kind of nacht swing style that simultaneously captures the good old days the town would like to live in and the queasy angst of the modern period it is stuck with," and called it "a perfect musical translation of a major facet of Lynch's vision."

Along with other jazz music in Twin Peaks, such as the song "Freshly Squeezed", "Audrey's Dance" is composed around a distinctive walking bassline, with a note on each beat. The bass descends and then ascends on a chromatic scale on an octave starting with C, accompanied by improvisation on other instruments rooted in the C blues scale.

The Twin Peaks walking bassline in "Audrey's Dance"

Badalamenti wrote the piece with multiple harmonic suspensions; in his words, "For this song, I got involved in the use of suspensions ... [which are] dissonant notes that work in chords that rub against the melody ... and create a nice tension, and sometimes you take that dissonance, resolve it, and go to another melody." For example, the song makes repeated use of a dissonant chord that the Australian writer and musician Clare Nina Norelli called "the Audrey chord": G–C–F♯.

The "Audrey chord"

The chord, used in the intro on a synthesized vibraphone, contains a tritone, a sinister-sounding musical interval historically associated with the devil. Further dissonance in the piece comes from the big band-style brass instruments and clarinet, which build into a "near-deafening cacophony". According to Norelli, the cumulative effect of the piece's unresolved harmonic elements is a "dreamscape" that is "not only dreamy but downright spooky, and it feels as if someone has been placed under some sort of nightmarish trance." "Audrey's Dance" borrows motifs from "Laura Palmer's Theme"—first sporadic melodies such as the "Dark Introduction" and the "Doom" motif, then an extended climactic use of the "Climb" motif, which is interrupted before returning to the "Doom" motif at the conclusion.

The percussion is marked by finger snapping and drumming with distinctive brushwork on a snare drum by Grady Tate. Kinny Landrum, who performed synthesizer for the Twin Peaks soundtrack, was inspired to add the snaps by the song "Cool" from the musical West Side Story. Landrum recognized Richard Beymer—who plays Benjamin Horne in Twin Peaks—from his role as Tony in the 1961 film version of West Side Story. Although Lynch and Badalamenti were initially reluctant to include the finger snaps, the choice proved to be fortuitous, and the show managed to include various moments of actors snapping their fingers in time to the music.

=== Related compositions and variations ===
The main version of "Audrey's Dance" appears on Soundtrack from Twin Peaks, released on September 11, 1990 by Warner Bros. A number of variations on the piece appeared in Twin Peaks, including versions with different instrumental arrangements and speeds. There are also distinct pieces based on "Audrey's Dance" like "Sneaky Audrey", a short musical cue that typically accompanied Audrey Horne's investigation. Many of these variations were released on the 2011 compilation The Twin Peaks Archive. An early demo version of the track, titled "Slow Cool Jazz", features a solo performance by Badalamenti on Rhodes piano.

Outside of Twin Peaks, the song "Up in Flame"—written by Lynch and Badalamenti—features a similar walking bassline and other compositional elements. A version of "Up in Flames" performed by Julee Cruise appeared in Industrial Symphony No. 1—a musical play directed by Lynch also starring Nicolas Cage, Laura Dern, and Michael J. Anderson—and a performance by blues singer Koko Taylor appeared in the Lynch film Wild at Heart (1990).

== Usage in Twin Peaks ==
=== Seasons one and two (1990–91) ===
"Audrey's Dance" in "Episode 2". Audrey Horne says "God, I love this music. Isn't it too dreamy?" before dancing to the jukebox in the Double R Diner.

"Audrey's Dance" is used as both diegetic music—that is, music that characters in the show can hear—as well as (non-diegetic) background music, making it one of a few songs on the Twin Peaks soundtrack that also exists within the universe of the show. Despite its title, "Audrey's Dance" was not originally intended to be associated with Audrey Horne (played by Sherilyn Fenn), a character who was "[o]riginally conceived as a background figure of no specific importance." In early cue sheets for the Twin Peaks pilot episode, the song was called "Cool, Cool Kyle" and "Bobby's Theme", suggesting an intended connection to Dale Cooper (played by Kyle MacLachlan) and Bobby Briggs (played by Dana Ashbrook). From the beginning of the show onward, the song is associated with multiple characters beyond Audrey. In the pilot, the song is identified with Dale Cooper, Bobby Briggs, and Bobby's friend Mike Nelson. Norelli suggests that the explicit association with Audrey Horne was an afterthought.

The piece first appears in the pilot, where it is used alongside scenes with Dale Cooper and Bobby Briggs. It appears in "Episode 1" when Audrey dances to it in the office of her father, Benjamin Horne, at the Great Northern Hotel; Benjamin Horne takes the needle off the record, stopping the piece, and tells his daughter to stop playing loud music in his office. Audrey dances to it again in "Episode 2", where she chooses it from a jukebox at the Double R Diner. Fenn improvised the dance on the spot without choreography or rehearsal, as Lynch had rewritten the scene to include the dance at the last minute. According to Fenn,

The day where Audrey dances in the diner I came to the set and David said, "We're going to get some cappuccinos and rewrite this scene and at the end you’re just gonna stand up and start to groove to this really cool, sexy, jazzy thing that Angelo and I just wrote! It's Audrey's theme, you're just gonna get lost in that music!" I said, "What do you mean? I just worked this scene out with my teacher!" I was so nervous, [laughs] but I love him and trust him and said okay. I didn't know sometimes what I was doing, to be honest. He knows the world and if you trust him and go into it, you'll fly if you don’t think about it too much."

Critics have praised the scene and the use of "Audrey's Dance" in "Episode 2", calling it "Audrey's most famous moment ... without question" and "one of Twin Peaks' most iconic moments." David Bushman and Arthur Smith also called the scene "iconic" and opined that "[i]t's a tableau that feels oddly suspended in time, mesmerizingly erotic, faintly nostalgic, and mildly unsettling, though it's hard to put your finger on just why—in other words, it's pure Twin Peaks, and we love it."

=== Twin Peaks: The Return (2017) ===
The piece made a surprise reappearance in "Part 16" of the 2017 third season of Twin Peaks when Audrey dances to it at the Roadhouse. Similar to the dance in "Episode 2", Fenn improvised the dance in "Part 16" with minimal direction from Lynch—although when the director asked her to dance like she had in 1990, Fenn protested "I'm not 24, I'm frickin' 52 and I can't do it the same." "Audrey's Dance" also plays in reverse over the episode's credit sequence. The band on stage, portrayed by extras who were actual musicians, accurately reflects the instrumentation of the piece with two clarinet players, an upright bassist, a drummer playing with brushes, and a pianist (playing Johnny Jewel's Rhodes piano).

Dean Hurley, the music supervisor for the third season, said the piece had been used in the original series as a "hypnotic thing where [Audrey is] almost overtaken and goes into a trance dancing to the song". The use of the piece in the third season was intended to convey a similar effect. Hurley continued:

Something's going on with her—you know, it's anyone's guess what it is—but that music cue is somehow pivotal to the whole thing. And I mean, I can't even speak to it because I don't know what's going on. But something's going on. And I think that something is defined in David's head and why he wanted to do, specifically, this 'Audrey's Dance' reprise and work that into her storyline.

== Samples and cover versions ==
San Francisco-based rapper Andre Nickatina sampled "Audrey's Dance" for his 1995 track "Straight 2 the Point", which is not a rap song per se but a series of name drops over a beat. At Danish music site Heartbeats.dk, Fabian Hansen wrote (translated into English) that "with its tough jazz beat and creepy keys, 'Audrey's Dance' is actually quite impeccable as a musical backdrop for gangsta attitudes."

In 2016, experimental rock band Xiu Xiu covered "Audrey's Dance" on Plays the Music of Twin Peaks. The rendition was praised in Pitchfork, whose contributor Daniel Dylan Wray wrote that the band's "usual sonic attack was mellowed considerably by the rich ambience of Badalamenti's original" and that their cover "feels both experimental yet deeply attuned to what made Twin Peaks such a fascinating listen—and watch, of course—in the first place." Tom Marsh of The Quietus wrote "[t]here's something really satisfying about hearing the vibraphone theme to 'Audrey's Dance' suddenly pop up over a scratchy, subterranean bedrock of electronic drums and synth squiggles," calling the cover "a pretty perfect marriage of styles, and when guitar squawls, skitter percussion and random beeps complicate the mix, it sounds jazzy but never like a cacophony, because those Badalamenti vibraphone and piano motifs guide us through."

== Reception ==
Brian Coney at The Quietus praised "Audrey's Dance" as an example of the Twin Peaks soundtrack's "genre-warping range." In particular, Coney highlighted the piece's "slinking bass-line, jarring woodwinds, brushed percussion, finger-clicks and vibraphone: equal parts suggestive and sinister, its woozy lounge sway implies proposition and deceit in unison, each off-kilter stab symbolising the unpredictability of the show's high-school femme fatale Audrey Horne."

Vulture named the reprise of "Audrey's Dance" as the best musical TV moment of 2017. Critic Sean T. Collins wrote that the "unexpected" use of the piece prompted the audience "to contemplate nostalgia, aging, the folly of youth, the regrets of adulthood, the nature of reality, music, magic, and whether the mistakes of the past can ever truly be put right — Twin Peaks: The Return in musical form. No other cue this year was more complex, more resonant, or more intriguing."

Jason Heller at The A.V. Club noted that Twin Peaks and "Audrey's Dance" were a key stylistic influence on the late-90s swing revival, "a missing link between old-school exotica and Cocktail Nation."
