= Don Rickles filmography =

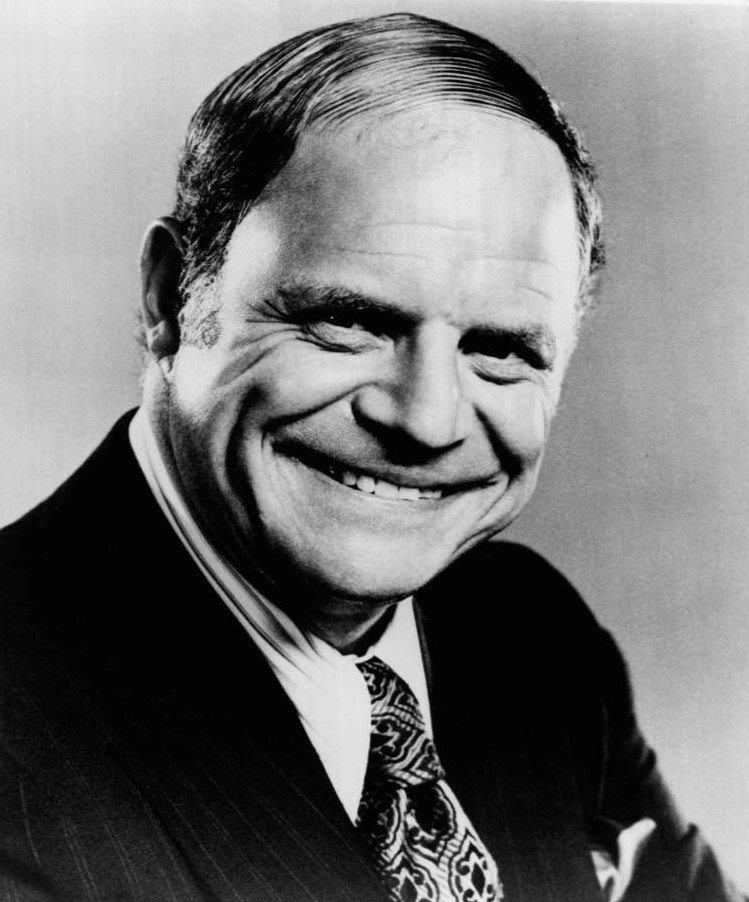
Rickles in 1973

Don Rickles (May 8, 1926 – April 6, 2017) was an American actor, author, and stand-up comedian, his following roles are his roles in feature films, television programmings, video games, theme park attractions, and live shows.

== Film ==
Year	Title	Role	Notes
1958	Run Silent, Run Deep	Quartermaster 1st Class Ruby	
1959	The Rabbit Trap	Mike O'Halloran	
1960	The Rat Race	Nellie	
1963	X: The Man with the X-ray Eyes	Crane	
1964	Muscle Beach Party	Jack Fanny	
1964	Bikini Beach	Big Drag	
1964	Pajama Party	Big Bang The Martian	
1965	Beach Blanket Bingo	Big Drop	
1967	Enter Laughing	Harry Hamburger	
1967	The Money Jungle	Harry Darkwater	
1969	Where It's At	Willie	
1970	Kelly's Heroes	Staff Sergeant "Crapgame"	
1971	The Love Machine	Announcer	Uncredited cameo
1975	Don Rickles: Buy This Tape You Hockey Puck	Himself	Documentary film
1990	Keaton's Cop	Jake	
1992	Innocent Blood	Emmanuel "Manny" Bergman	
1995	Casino	Billy Sherbert	
	Arabian Knight	Goblet, Tickle	
	Toy Story	Mr. Potato Head	Voice
1997	Redux Riding Hood	The Boss	Voice; short film
1998	Quest for Camelot	Cornwall	Voice
1998	Dirty Work	Mr. Hamilton	
1998	Dennis the Menace Strikes Again	George Wilson	Direct-to-video film
1999	Toy Story 2	Mr. Potato Head	Voice
2007	Mr. Warmth: The Don Rickles Project	Himself / Various	Documentary
2010	Toy Story 3	Mr. Potato Head	Voice
2011	Hawaiian Vacation	Mr. Potato Head	Voice; short film
2011	Small Fry	Mr. Potato Head	Voice; short film
2011	Zookeeper	Jim the Bullfrog	Voice
2012	Partysaurus Rex	Mr. Potato Head	Voice; short film
2019	Toy Story 4	Mr. Potato Head	Voice; posthumous release via reused unused archival audio; final film role; dedicated to his memory

== Television ==
Year(s)	Title	Role	Notes
1955	Stage 7	Announcer	Episode: "A Note of Fear"
1955–1956	Cavalcade of America	Commentator	2 episodes
1956	Chevron Hall of Stars	Announcer	2 episodes
1956	Four Star Playhouse	Announcer	Episode: "The Listener" (uncredited)
1957	M Squad	Unknown	Episode: "Pete Loves Mary" (deleted scenes)
1959	The Thin Man	Eddie	Episode: "The Cat Kicker"
1959–1960	The DuPont Show with June Allyson	Reporter / Newscaster / Announcer	3 episodes
1961	The Twilight Zone	Bettor	Episode: "Mr. Dingle, the Strong"
1961	Wagon Train	Joe Carder	Episode: "Wagon to Fort Anderson"
1961	Hennesey	Chief Petty Officer Ernie Schmidt	Episode: "Professional Sailor"
1962	The Dick Powell Show	Newscaster	Episode: "Seeds of April"
1962	Cain's Hundred	Dave Molloy	Episode: "Blood Money"
1963–1965	Burke's Law	Various	3 episodes
1964	The Addams Family	Claude	Episode: "Halloween With the Addams Family"
1964	The Dick Van Dyke Show	Lyle Delp	2 episodes
1965	The Beverly Hillbillies	Fred	Episode: "Jed's Temptation"
1965	Gomer Pyle, U.S.M.C.	Sergeant Jim Mason	Episode: "My Buddy, the War Hero"
1965	The Munsters	"Doc" Happy Havemeyer	Episode: "Dance with Me, Herman"
1965	The Andy Griffith Show	Newton Munroe	Episode: "The Luck of Newton Munroe"
1965–1966	Bob Hope Presents the Chrysler Theatre	Linny	2 episodes
1965–1992	The Tonight Show Starring Johnny Carson	Guest / Guest-Host / Himself / Various	131 episodes
1966–1967	Run for Your Life	Willy Hatch / Leo Mazinov	2 episodes
1966–1967	F Troop	Bald Eagle	Episode: "The Return of Bald Eagle"
1966	The Wild Wild West	Asmodeus	Episode: "The Night of the Druid's Blood"
1966	The Bob Hope Show	Himself	5 episodes
1966	Gilligan's Island	Norbert Wiley	Episode: "The Kidnapper"
1966–1981	The Mike Douglas Show	Co-Host / Comedian / Himself / Vocalist	29 episodes
1967	The Lucy Show	Eddie Rickles	Episode: "Lucy the Fight Manager"
1967	I Spy	Frank Bodie	Episode: "Night Train to Madrid"
1967	I Dream of Jeannie	Francis N. Kiski	Episode: "My Master, the Weakling"
1967–1969	The Joey Bishop Show	Himself / Host	15 episodes
1967–1974	The Hollywood Squares (Daytime)	Center Square / Himself / Panelist	28 episodes
1968–1969	The Don Rickles Show	Himself (host)	17 episodes
1968–1969	Get Smart	Sid Krimm / Guard	3 episodes
1968, 1970	The Carol Burnett Show	Shoe salesman / Painter	2 episodes
1972	The Don Rickles Show	Don Robinson	13 episodes
1973	A Couple of Dons	Himself	Television special
1974	Sanford and Son	Fight Announcer	Voice; Episode: "Once a Thief"
1976	Medical Center	S. Ruskin	Episode: "The Happy State of Depression"
1976–1978	C.P.O. Sharkey	"C.P.O. Otto Sharkey"	37 episodes
1980	Don Rickles and His Wise Guys	Himself	HBO special
1982	Archie Bunker's Place	Al Snyder	Episode: "Death of a Lodger"
1983	Gimme a Break!	Max	Episode: "Nell and the Kid"
1983–1988	Late Night with David Letterman	Guest / Himself	3 episodes
1984	Saturday Night Live	Guest / Himself	Season 9, Episode 11
1985	George Burns Comedy Week	Mayor	Episode: "Disaster at Buzz Creek"
1989	Newhart	Don Prince	Episode: "The Nice Man Cometh"
1990	Tales from the Crypt	Mr. Ingles	Episode: "The Ventriloquist's Dummy"
1991	Hunter	Harold Schwan	Episode: "Ex Marks the Spot"
1993	Daddy Dearest	Al Mitchell	13 episodes
1993–2015	Late Show with David Letterman	Guest / Himself	20 episodes
1994–2011	The Tonight Show with Jay Leno	Guest / Himself	19 episodes
1997	The Larry Sanders Show	Himself	Episode: "Artie and Angie and Hank and Hercules"
1997	The Single Guy	Dr. Dick Sloan	Episode: "Big Baby"
1998	Murphy Brown	Leonard, Secretary No. 90	Episode: "Dial and Substance"
2000	72nd Academy Awards	Mr. Potato Head	Voice; television film
2002	The Bernie Mac Show	Himself	Episode: "The Sweet Life"
2004	The Wool Cap	Ira	Television film
2005	The Catch	Roy Kozikowski	Pilot
2005–2014	The Late Late Show with Craig Ferguson	Guest / Himself	13 episodes
2007	The Unit	Himself / Priest	Episode: "Sub-Conscious"
2007–2016	Jimmy Kimmel Live!	Guest / Himself	15 episodes
2009	Kathy Griffin: My Life on the D-List	Himself	Episode: "Maggie's Bucket List"
2011	Hot in Cleveland	Bobby	2 episodes
2013	Comedians in Cars Getting Coffee	Himself (guest)	Episode: "You'll Never Play the Copa"
2013	Toy Story of Terror!	Mr. Potato Head	Voice; television special
2014	Toy Story That Time Forgot	Mr. Potato Head	Voice; television special
2014	Don Rickles: One Night Only	Himself	Television Special, Spike
2017	Dinner with Don	Himself (host)	13 episodes; posthumous release
2023	Agent Elvis	Himself	Episode: "F*ck You, Vegas"; posthumous release vocal cameo via archival audio

== Video games ==
Year	Title	Voice
1996	Animated Storybook: Toy Story	Mr. Potato Head
1999	Toy Story 2: Buzz Lightyear to the Rescue	Mr. Potato Head
2001	Toy Story Racer	Mr. Potato Head

== Live shows ==
- Toy Story: The Musical – Mr. Potato Head (voice)

=== Theme park attractions ===
- The Enchanted Tiki Room (Under New Management) - William
- Toy Story Midway Mania! – Mr. Potato Head
