= Episode 1 (Twin Peaks) =

- Twin Peaks episode
- Episode no.: Season 1 Episode 2
- Directed by: Duwayne Dunham
- Written by: David Lynch; Mark Frost
- Original air date: April 12, 1990
- Running time: 46 minutes

Guest appearances
- Grace Zabriskie as Sarah Palmer; Don Davis as Major Garland Briggs; Mary Jo Deschanel as Eileen Hayward; Charlotte Stewart as Betty Briggs; Gary Hershberger as Mike Nelson; Wendy Robie as Nadine Hurley; Kimmy Robertson as Lucy Moran; Catherine E. Coulson as Margaret Lanterman / "The Log Lady"; Al Strobel as "The One-Armed Man"; Frank Silva as Killer BOB (uncredited)

Episode chronology
← Previous "Pilot"	Next → "Episode 2"

"Episode 1", also known as "Traces to Nowhere", (Note: Although the series originally did not have episode titles, when it was broadcast in Germany the episodes were given titles that are now used by some fans and critics.) is the second episode of the first season of the American surrealist mystery horror drama television series Twin Peaks. The episode was written by series creators David Lynch and Mark Frost, and directed by Duwayne Dunham. "Episode 1" features series regulars Kyle MacLachlan, Michael Ontkean, and Richard Beymer.

Dunham was offered the role of directing the episode by Lynch, who wanted Dunham to edit his next film project, Wild at Heart (1990). Dunham continued to use several stylistic elements in his direction that he had observed in Lynch's work on "Pilot", including largely static camera work and the use of reddish color tints. The episode also marks the first appearance of Killer Bob, who was played by set decorator Frank Silva after Silva had been accidentally caught on camera.

"Episode 1" continued the investigation of the series' main plotline, the murder of schoolgirl Laura Palmer (Sheryl Lee), with Federal Bureau of Investigation agent Dale Cooper (MacLachlan) interviewing several suspects connected to the victim. The episode was viewed by approximately 14.9 million households upon its initial airing, which represented over a quarter of the available audience. Since its broadcast, the episode has earned positive reviews from critics.

== Plot ==
=== Background ===
The small town of Twin Peaks, Washington, has been shocked by the murder of schoolgirl Laura Palmer (Sheryl Lee) and the attempted murder of her classmate Ronette Pulaski (Phoebe Augustine). Federal Bureau of Investigation special agent Dale Cooper (Kyle MacLachlan) has come to the town to investigate, and initial suspicion has fallen upon Palmer's boyfriend Bobby Briggs (Dana Ashbrook) and the man with whom she was cheating on Briggs, James Hurley (James Marshall).

=== Events ===
Cooper takes breakfast at the Great Northern Hotel, enjoying a "damn fine cup of coffee" as Audrey Horne (Sherilyn Fenn) introduces herself and begins flirting with him. He makes his way to the sheriff's department, where he and Sheriff Truman (Michael Ontkean) discuss the day's plans. They interview Dr Hayward (Warren Frost) who has had an autopsy conducted on Palmer's body. They learn that Laura was raped by at least three men the night she died.

Waitress Shelley Johnson (Mädchen Amick) is about to leave for work when her abusive husband Leo (Eric Da Re) demands she do more laundry. She finds a bloodstained shirt among Leo's clothes and hides it before he notices. However, he later realizes that it has gone missing. When she returns home that night, he questions her about its whereabouts, and savagely beats her with a bar of soap in a sock.

Cooper interviews Hurley about a video of Laura and Donna Hayward (Lara Flynn Boyle); Hurley had denied his being present the day it was taken but Cooper notices a reflection of his motorcycle in the video. Cooper confronts Hurley about the affair he was having with Palmer, and about her cocaine habit. Hurley admits seeing Palmer the night she died but denies killing her. James' uncle Ed Hurley (Everett McGill) comes to the sheriff's department to pick his nephew up. Ed tells Truman that he was drugged the previous night at The Roadhouse, the town's bar; he suspects bartender Jacques Renault (Walter Olkewicz) was responsible. Cooper takes a telephone call from his colleague Albert Rosenfield, who is on his way to aid the investigation. Meanwhile, Briggs and his friend Mike Nelson (Gary Hershberger) are in a jail cell, discussing money they owe to Leo. The $10,000 they were meant to pay him is in a safe deposit box owned by Palmer, which they can now no longer access. They are later released by Cooper, who warns them not to approach James Hurley. The scene fade cuts into a short clip from the VHS tape of Palmer dancing outdoors, and pauses on a close up of her face. The words "Help Me" can be heard.

Josie Packard (Joan Chen) and Pete Martell (Jack Nance) discuss Packard's trouble with her sister-in-law Catherine Martell (Piper Laurie). Truman and Cooper arrive to speak with Packard, who had employed Palmer as an English tutor. Packard admits to sensing that Palmer was troubled but cannot help further; Cooper picks up on the fact that Truman has been having a relationship with Packard. Catherine calls Packard to tell her that the latter's sawmill lost $87,000 the day before; Catherine is having an affair with Benjamin Horne (Richard Beymer), with whom she is conspiring a hostile takeover of the mill. That same day, Hayward visits Palmer's mother Sarah (Grace Zabriskie), attempting to console her. However, Sarah has a vision of a sinister man (Frank Silva) crouching in the corner of the room, and panics. Meanwhile, Lawrence Jacoby (Russ Tamblyn), Laura's psychiatrist, listens to an audio tape she had made for him, and sobs as he toys with half of a golden heart necklace, the other half of which was found at the scene of the crime.

== Production ==
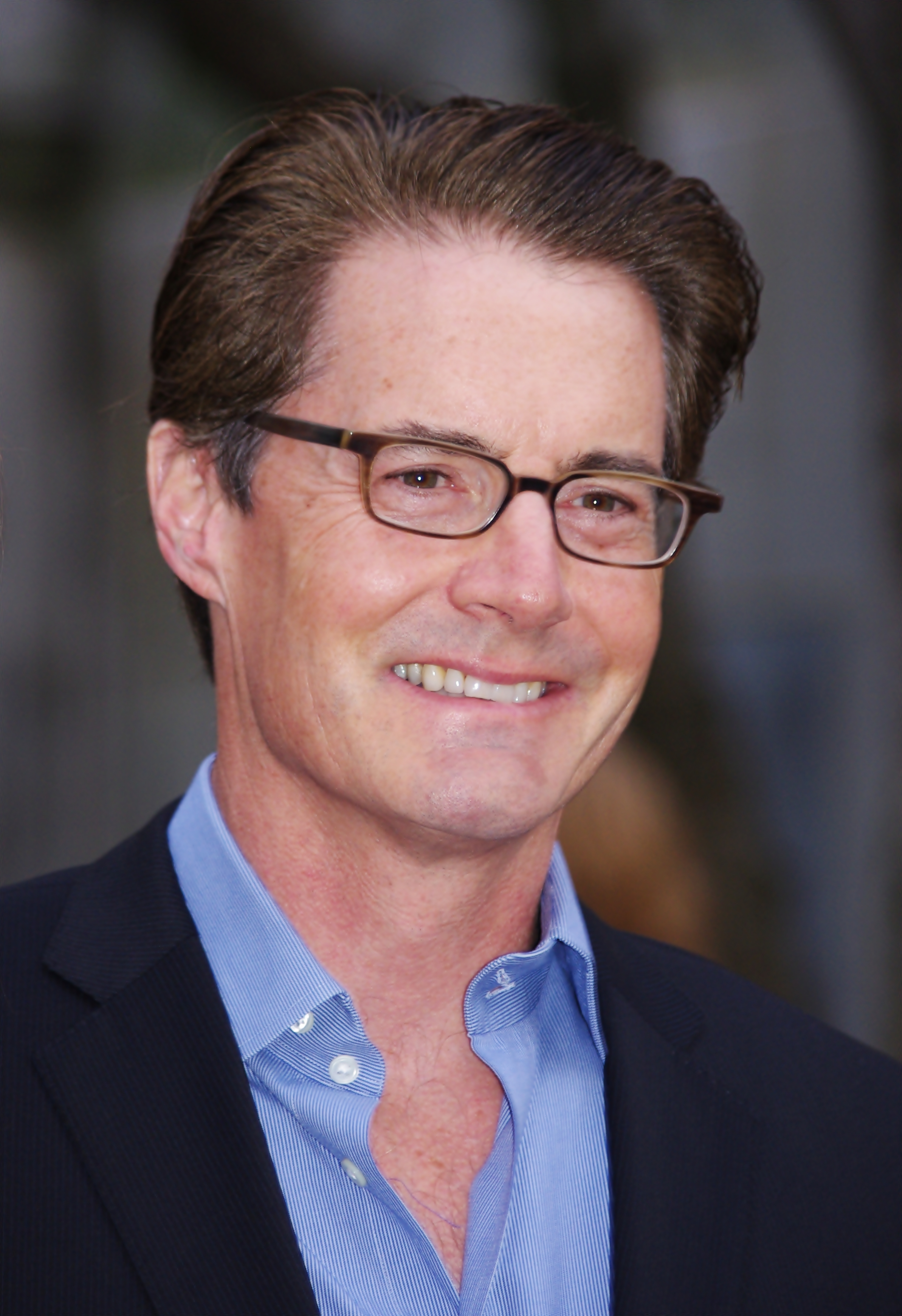
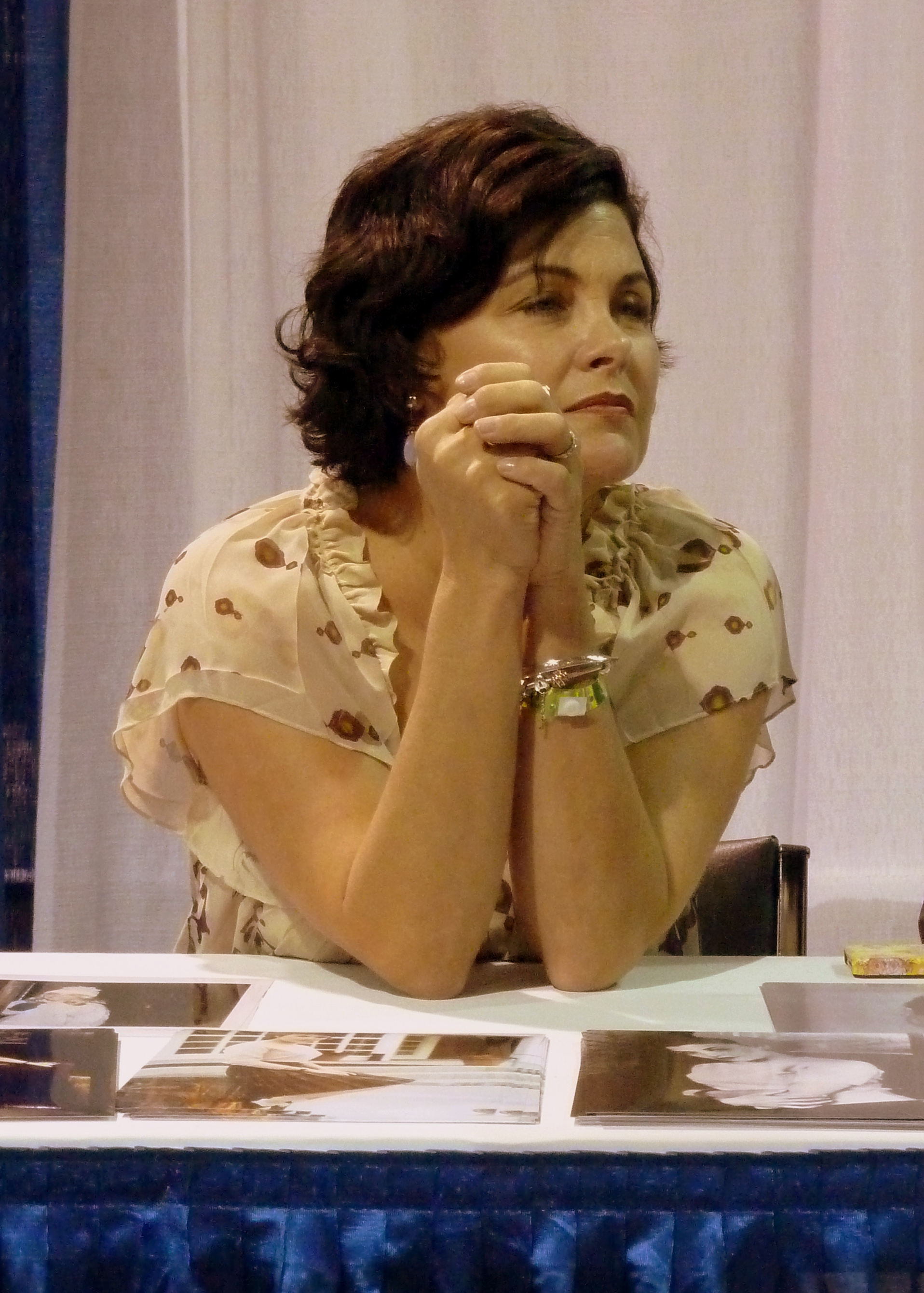
Director Duwayne Dunham felt that the interaction between cast members such as Kyle MacLachlan (left, 2011) and Sherilyn Fenn (right, 2012) was the true focus of the series.

"Episode 1" was written by the series creators David Lynch and Mark Frost. The pair had co-written "Pilot", and would also write "Episode 2" together. Frost would pen a further eight scripts for the series after that, while Lynch would write just one episode—the second season opening installment, "Episode 8". The episode was the first in the series to be directed by Duwayne Dunham, who would return to helm two further installments in the series' second season. The episode features the first appearance of Frank Silva as Killer Bob, though the character is not yet identified at this point. Silva was the art director for the series, and had accidentally been caught on camera during a shot. Lynch was pleased with the result and decided to include Silva in the cast from then on.

Dunham had first met Lynch when he worked as the film editor for Lynch's 1986 film Blue Velvet. Dunham then edited "Pilot", and was about to look for another editing job elsewhere when he asked Lynch if the director had another film planned; a week later Lynch decided to film Wild at Heart and asked Dunham to edit that as well. However, Dunham had committed to another project and felt uncomfortable leaving one editing job for another; Lynch then offered him a directing position on Twin Peaks in the interim to justify cancelling his other project. Dunham finished principal photography on "Episode 1" the same day that Lynch finished filming "Wild at Heart".

The introduction of a sexual rapport between the characters of Audrey Horne and Dale Cooper was a suggestion of Dunham's, who felt it would benefit both characters. Dunham felt that the central mystery in the series—the murder of schoolgirl Laura Palmer—was simply a "MacGuffin" to compel what he saw as the real focus, the interaction of the large ensemble cast. As such, he took care to introduce meaningful interactions between characters wherever possible. Dunham also spent time with each of the cast to help them develop their characters, having studied the scripts involved and basing his take on the characters on his experience with "Pilot".

Dunham retained the frequent use of static cameras seen in "Pilot", something he saw as a hallmark of Lynch's directing style; describing the result as "like framed pictures". He also continued the use of a "warm" reddish tint to the footage, using soft coral filters and carefully selected props and costumes to obtain this coloring. This tint was considered important enough that Lynch sent a representative to the network to ensure they understood it was deliberate and not a mistake, for fear that they might correct the saturation to be more "realistic" before broadcasting it.

== Broadcast and reception ==
Leo attempts to method-act his way into a "taller and less bald than I really am" frenzy in an attempt to inspire fear in pretty much anyone, but ... I remain unconvinced by his ostensibly sinister characterization.

— Television Without Pity's Daniel Blau on Eric Da Re's performance

"Episode 1" was first broadcast on American Broadcasting Company (ABC) on April 12, 1990. Upon its initial airing, it was seen by 14.9 million households, or 27 percent of the available audience. It placed second in its timeslot after Cheers. This marked a decline from "Pilot", which attracted 33 percent of the available audience. The following episode would be viewed by 21 percent of the available audience, representing a further drop in numbers.

Writing for The A.V. Club, Keith Phipps awarded the episode an "A−" rating. He felt that the scene showing Leo Johnson domestically abusing his wife was "among the show's most disturbing moments", comparing it to a scene from the 1990 film The Grifters. Phipps also felt the sound design in the episode was impressive, commenting positively on the blurred distinction between diegetic and non-diegetic music. Writing for Allrovi, Andrea LeVasseur rated the episode four stars out of five. Television Without Pity's Daniel J. Blau felt that the episode showed series composer Angelo Badalamenti to have limited range, repeating several similar musical cues throughout. He also considered Eric Da Re's performance as Leo Johnson to be unconvincing, finding it difficult to believe that the character was as feared and menacing as was implied. However, Blau described the introduction of Killer Bob as still seeming powerful and frightening even several years after first being seen, considering it a potent and disturbing scene.

== Footnotes ==
=== Bibliography ===
- Dunham, Duwayne (2001), Episode 1: Commentary (DVD), Twin Peaks: The Complete First Season: Artisan Entertainment
- Riches, Simon (2011). "Intuition and Investigation into Another Place: The Epistemological Role of Dreaming in Twin Peaks and Beyond". In Devlin, William J.; Biderman, Shai (eds.). The Philosophy of David Lynch. Lexington: University Press of Kentucky. ISBN 978-0-8131-3396-6.
