= Erik Rondell =

American actor, stuntman, and stunt co-ordinator

Erik Rondell (born July 8, 1967) (also credited as Eric Rondell, Erick Rondell and Erik L. Rondell) is an American actor, stuntman, and stunt co-ordinator with an almost forty year career in film and television. He is best known for his work on 24 and Nebraska and many more major series and movie franchises, plus most recently portraying the character of Johnny Horne in Twin Peaks: The Return.

== Career ==
Rondell started his career in Hollywood in 1982 or 1983, working on the film Private School, followed by several others, including: Dances with Wolves, Blade, Pearl Harbor, The Matrix Reloaded, and Captain America: The Winter Soldier. He has also worked on TV shows like True Detective, Sleeper Cell, Heroes, Westworld, NCIS: Los Angeles, True Blood, and Gilmore Girls. As a stunt coordinator, he has worked on music videos and commercials as well as on television shows and films. Among the notable shows and films in which he has appeared are 24 (stunts and several acting roles), Nebraska, Hurricane Heist, Daredevil, Gangster Squad, Ant-Man and the Wasp, The Patriot, The Darkest Minds, Blue Streak, G.I. Joe: Rise of the Cobra, Waterworld, Deep Blue Sea and The Million Dollar Hotel. Recently, his highest profile work has been portraying Johnny Horne in Twin Peaks, playing him in two episodes of the revival, Twin Peaks: The Return in 2017, replacing Robert Davenport, who played the character in the pilot, and Robert Bauer, who played him in four episodes of the original series. He has also recently acted in Agents of S.H.I.E.L.D. in 2020.

== Filmography ==
=== Film ===
Year	Title	Role	Notes
1992	Kuffs	Laundry Counterman	
1999	Blue Streak	Francois	
2000	The Million Dollar Hotel	Punk #2	
2009	Banana Bread	Gunman	(Short)
2010	Skyline	Soldier #2	
2018	The Hurricane Heist	Bruce	

=== Television ===
Year	Title	Role	Notes
1988	The Magical World of Disney	Student	Episode: "The Absent-Minded Professor"
1991	The Chase		Television film
1992	Baywatch	Danny	Episode: "Shark's Cove"
1993	Men Don't Tell	Mugger	Television film
2006	24	Agent McCullough	Episode: "Day 5: 5:00 a.m.-6:00 a.m."
2009	Lie to Me	Firefighter / Elevator Worker	2 episodes
2011	The Nine Lives of Chloe King	Bum	Episode: "Pilot"
2015	Stitchers	Van Driver	Episode: "I See You"
2017	Twin Peaks: The Return	Johnny Horne	2 episodes
2019	Dead to Me	Aggro Man	Episode: "Maybe I'm Crazy"
2020	Agents of S.H.I.E.L.D.		Episode: “Adapt or Die” (Season 7, Episode 6)

=== Stunts / Stunt Co-ordinator ===
(Table needs to be added. For credits, see: Talk:Erik Rondell#Filmography Table for Stunt Roles.)
