= A Time to Remember (film) =

- Written by: William Sims Myers
- Directed by: John Putch
- Starring: Doris Roberts; Dana Delany
- Theme music composer: James Gelfand
- Country of origin: United States
- Original language: English

Production
- Producer: Kevin Bocarde

Original release
- Network: Hallmark Channel
- Release: November 23, 2003

A Time to Remember is a 2003 American drama television film directed by John Putch and starring Doris Roberts and Dana Delany. It premiered on Hallmark Channel on November 23, 2003.

== Premise ==
Maggie Calhoun is diagnosed with Alzheimer's disease. Her two very different daughters, Britt and Valetta, come together on Thanksgiving Day.

== Cast ==
- Doris Roberts as Maggie Calhoun
- Dana Delany as Britt Calhoun
- Megan Gallagher as Valetta Proctor
- Louise Fletcher as Billy
- Rosemary Forsyth as Dorothy Walderson
- Robert Bauer as Nicholas
- Erich Anderson as Julian Proctor
- Amy Steel as Claire Goodman Isenberg
- Davenia McFadden as Marion
- Michael Dean Jacobs as Cousin Merle
- Karly Rothenberg as Cousin Connie
