= Head Case =

- Created by: Alexandra Wentworth; Robert Bauer
- Starring: Alexandra Wentworth; Steve Landesberg; Michelle Arthur
- Country of origin: United States
- Original language: English
- No. of seasons: 3
- No. of episodes: 28

Production
- Executive producers: Robert Bauer; Jason Farrand; Alexandra Wentworth
- Production location: Los Angeles
- Running time: 12 minutes (season 1); 25 minutes (seasons 2–3)
- Production company: Starz Media

Original release
- Network: Starz
- Release: April 18, 2007 – May 22, 2009

Head Case is an American sitcom starring Alexandra Wentworth as Dr. Elizabeth Goode, a therapist who treats Hollywood stars. Celebrities appear on the show as themselves. The show ran for three seasons, airing on the Starz premium television network on Wednesdays, at 10 p.m. ET. H. Scott Salinas composed the show's music.

== Plot ==
Dr. Elizabeth Goode is a brash, unconventional and judgmental therapist and thus has become the "it" therapist to those in Hollywood that need some help. Her office is filled with a who's who world of entertainment, sport and music. And even though she is not your typical therapist, her patients always wind up returning for another session.

== Cast ==
=== Main cast ===
- Alexandra Wentworth as Dr. Elizabeth Goode, a graduate magna cum laude from Wellesley College before earning her master's degree at Johns Hopkins University.
- Steve Landesberg as Freudian psychiatrist Dr. Myron Finkelstein, who shares an office with Goode.
- Michelle Arthur as Lola Buckingham, the British receptionist to Dr. Goode and Finkelstein.

=== Recurring cast ===
- Candace Brown as Goldie Finklestein
- Rob Benedict as Jeremy Berger
- Aris Alvarado as Ron Julio

=== Notable guest cameos ===
- Pamela Adlon
- Magali Amadei
- Rosanna Arquette
- Mario Batali
- Dave Batista
- Sandra Bernhard
- Craig Bierko
- Lance Burton
- Marc Cherry
- James Denton
- Andy Dick
- Tate Donovan
- Illeana Douglas
- Rich Eisen
- Jennifer Finnigan
- Rick Fox
- Janeane Garofalo
- Willie Garson
- Natalie Garza
- Nicole Garza
- Jeff Goldblum
- Macy Gray
- David Alan Grier
- Greg Grunberg
- Geri Halliwell
- Sean Hayes
- Hugh Hefner
- Michael Hitchcock
- Jane Kaczmarek
- Melina Kanakaredes
- Richard Kind
- Jason Lewis
- Phill Lewis
- Christopher Lloyd
- Traci Lords
- Shelby Lynne
- Ralph Macchio
- Joel Madden
- Cindy Margolis
- Dean McDermott
- Anne Meara
- Larry Miller
- Isaac Mizrahi
- Alanis Morissette
- Kevin Nealon
- Liz Phair
- Paulina Porizkova
- Monica Potter
- Jason Priestley
- Jeff Probst
- Kevin Rahm
- Jerry Seinfeld
- Jonathan Silverman
- Tom Sizemore
- Ione Skye
- Tori Spelling
- Jerry Stiller
- Trudie Styler
- Nicole Sullivan
- Tiffani Thiessen
- Lea Thompson
- Callie Thorne
- Jeff Vespa
- Fred Willard
- Ahmet Zappa
- Laura Kightlinger

== Episodes ==
=== Season 1 (2007) ===
No.	Title	Original release date
1	"Goode Morning"	April 18, 2007
Hollywood's "it" therapist to the stars is judgmental and unorthodox - but everybody who's anybody must get in to see her.
2	"Celebrity Ambassadress"	April 25, 2007
Ione Skye analyzes her sexuality and dreams; and one of the doctors has a promiscuous sister.
3	"Dick in Review"	May 2, 2007
Dr. Goode helps Andy Dick get ready for an audition that he's nervous about; and Shelby Lynne has a case of pre-show stage fright.
4	"Tom Sizemore and Traci Lords"	May 9, 2007
Dr. Goode takes on the Herculean task of analyzing a sketchy Tom Sizemore; and Traci Lords heats things up with Dr. Finkelstein.
5	"Ralph Macchio and Liz Phair"	May 16, 2007
Dr. Goode helps Ralph Macchio unleash his inner child; and Liz Phair opens up about her love life.
6	"Only the Lonely"	May 23, 2007
After experiencing several bad dates from an online dating service, Dr. Goode takes her frustrations out on her patients; and Tom Sizemore come back for more treatment.
7	"Ladies Night"	May 30, 2007
Dr. Goode and her assistant go out on the town following a session with Rick Fox; Sean Hayes finds himself at the bar and hits Dr. Goode up for some advice.
8	"It's All Good(e)"	June 6, 2007
Dr. Finkelstein takes an ad out in the yellow pages; Dr. Goode finally meets a man she likes from the dating service; and Willie Garson finds himself all alone.
9	"Pair of Hearts"	June 13, 2007
Dr. Goode's new boyfriend begins showing his feelings; Fred Willard is confused; and while Willie Garson waits, he thinks of a way to make some quick cash.
10	"Baked Goodes"	June 20, 2007
Alanis Morissette turns her session around with Dr. Goode to help her with her problems.

=== Season 2 (2008) ===
No.	Title	Original release date
11	"Live and Let Diet"	January 23, 2008
Still smarting from the indiscretions of "the whipped cream incident," Dr. Goode avoids the apologetic advances of her ex, Jeremy. In session Ione Skye and new patient Jeff Goldblum find the doctor in a "fix it fast" mode. Myron misses a staff meeting, again.
12	"El Finks"	January 30, 2008
Dr. Goode has combative sessions with Richard Kind and a particularly needy Lea Thompson. After receiving a panicked phone call from Desperate Housewives creator Marc Cherry, Dr. Goode cancels her day and heads out to Wisteria Lane. With some spare time on their hands, Lola helps Myron market himself to the Latino community.
13	"A Tard for All Seasons"	February 6, 2008
Andy Dick struggles with his time management and the bottle, while Pamela Adlon takes matters into her own hands when her session is compromised. After receiving some advice from Lola, Jeremy Berger cooks up an ingenious scheme to get back in the Doctor's good books…
14	"Goode Vibes"	February 13, 2008
Dr. Goode tries to convince Joel Madden that there is more to life than music; Dr. Finkelstein is shocked by a surprise visitor from his past.
15	"Parental Guidance Required"	February 20, 2008
An unexpected visit from Dr. Goode's parents makes her day even more hectic; Greg Grunberg explains that he's been having erotic dreams; and Ahmet Zappa brings an odd gift to his session.
16	"Come Together"	February 27, 2008
Dr. Goode's father comes and visits the practice; David Alan Grier lets something slip, concerning Pamela Adlon; and Monica Potter has a case of mistaken identity
17	"Best Laid Plans"	March 5, 2008
Dr. Goode gets an emergency call from Trudie Styler; Jason Lewis has his manhood questioned; and Christopher Lloyd disappears in the middle of his session.
18	"Dreading Bells"	March 12, 2008
Myron and Lola are uncomfortable, until a package shows up; both Jonathan Silverman and Jennifer Finnigan try to fire Dr. Goode; and Bry, the guy from Fatburger, has a confession to make.

=== Season 3 (2009) ===
No.	Title	Original release date
19	"The Wedding Ringer"	March 20, 2009
Macy Gray thinks she can run for President; Tori Spelling & Dean McDermott find Dr. Goode in a pre-nuptial bliss; Myron receives a timely gift from a car wash owner.
20	"Talk to the List"	March 27, 2009
Dr. Goode gets into a monetary argument with her wedding planner, and her fiance wants access to the guest list. Patients are Larry Miller and Marc Cherry.
21	"Tying the... Not"	April 3, 2009
Dr. Goode's wedding finally takes place, but what has she actually gotten herself into? Patients are Tate Donovan, who has dating issues, and Jeff Probst, who suffers from a case of mistaken identity.
22	"Elizabeth Hughes"	April 10, 2009
The morning after the wedding, her new husband Jeremy Berger drops a bombshell that sends the good doctor reeling into a dark downward spiral. However, Lola comes to her rescue and Dr. Goode has a successful session with Hugh Hefner at the Playboy Mansion.
23	"Back in the Game"	April 17, 2009
Recovering from her marriage, which lasted all of four hours, Dr. Goode tries some self-therapy. Meanwhile, former Spice Girl Geri Halliwell comes to her with an identity crisis, and Dr. Finkelstein has joined a high-stakes gambling ring.
24	"Short on Love"	April 24, 2009
Dr. Goode battles her ex from NYC, and tries to get back into dating, but things do not go well. Meanwhile, Lola becomes an entrepreneur and starts a magic "blendie" business out of the LA office.
25	"That's Produce"	May 1, 2009
Self-doubt dogs Dr. Goode as she tries to figure out what went wrong in her former relationship with chef Mario Batali. Meanwhile, patient Sandra Bernhard wrestles with religious restrictions.
26	"Twinkle, Twinkle..."	May 8, 2009
Returning to LA, Dr. Goode gets together with Michael McDonald in a final effort to get back into dating. Meanwhile, Myron gets a visit via video from his ex wife, the legendary Twinkle Finkelstein.
27	"All About Steve"	May 15, 2009
After WWE star Dave Batista convinces her of the nobility of single parenthood, Dr. Goode decides to adopt. Meanwhile, Dr. Finkelstein takes a trip back east, but gets waylaid on his way there.
28	"The Big Book"	May 22, 2009
Dr. Goode returns to New York City to meet with new patient Jerry Seinfeld. Then, back in LA, she looks into a possible book deal.

== Home media ==
The first season was a series of ten 12-minute shorts, and are found on DVD as "bonus shorts" on Disc 2 of Starz/Anchor Bay's "Season 1" release (where Disc 1 has the eight 25-minute episodes of the second televised season).

Name	Ep #	Region 1	Region 4
Season One/Two	18	March 17, 2009	October 19, 2009
Season Three	10	February 2, 2010	May 4, 2010
