= Robert Bauer (actor) =

American actor and producer

- Born: Phillip Bauer
- Occupations: Actor, producer, screenwriter, director
- Known for: This Is Spinal Tap, The Sure Thing, Twin Peaks, Star Trek: The Next Generation

Robert Bauer (born Phillip Bauer, sometimes credited as "Bobby Bauer") is an American actor, producer, screenwriter, and director. He is best known for playing Moke in Rob Reiner's movies This Is Spinal Tap (1984) and The Sure Thing (1985), Johnny Horne in Twin Peaks, Jordan in Flying Blind, Roland Sachs in 54 (1998), Hook in Sabrina, the Teenage Witch, and Kunivas – a male Klingon officer – in Star Trek: The Next Generation. He is also known for his producing work on films like Waitress (2007), the TV series Head Case, and the web series Dinner with Don.

He played Moke, the band's roadie, in Rob Reiner's movie This Is Spinal Tap (1984) and later played the same role in another Reiner movie the following year, The Sure Thing (1985). He also played Lambsblood in A Spinal Tap Reunion: The 25th Anniversary London Sell-Out (1992).

He is one of three actors to portray the character of Johnny Horne, the intellectually disabled son of Benjamin Horne and brother of Audrey Horne, in Twin Peaks. He was the second actor, replacing Robert Davenport, who played the character in the Pilot. Bauer portrayed Johnny in the most episodes and is probably the best known for the role, appearing in four episodes of the original series over the course of the first and second seasons. He was replaced by Erik Rondell in the revival.

He played Roland Sachs in 54 (1998). Other film roles include Nicholas in A Time to Remember (2003), Dirk in Dirk and Betty (2000) (which he co-directed with Paul Gordon), Mr. Clarence in Intrepid (2000), Breeze in Boogie Boy (1998), Ben in Something to Live for: The Alison Gertz Story (aka Fatal Love), and roles in Father of the Bride (1991), Parker Kane (TVM 1990), and The Big Picture (1989).

Television series roles include Jordan in Flying Blind, Hook in Sabrina, the Teenage Witch, Leo in an episode of Party of Five, Eddie Stokes in an episode of M.A.N.T.I.S., and Kunivas, a male Klingon officer in the Klingon Defense Force in the 24th century in the episode "Heart of Glory" of Star Trek: The Next Generation.

Other television roles include NYPD Blue, The Lot, In Living Color, Quantum Leap, Father Dowling Investigates, and more.

He is an accomplished drummer and was in a band called "The Watch" with actor Michael Dorn (who played bass). They also guest-starred together in Star Trek: The Next Generation.

He is also known for his producing credits, which include Dinner with Don (2017), Waitress (2007), Head Case, and more. He co-created Bauerbrook Films with actor, friend, and Twin Peaks co-star Dana Ashbrook.

== Filmography ==
=== Film ===
Year	Title	Role	Notes
1971	Desperate Characters	Young Man	
1984	This Is Spinal Tap	Moke	
1985	The Sure Thing	Moke	
1989	The Big Picture	Wounded Soldier	
1991	Father of the Bride	Waiter No. 2	
1998	Boogie Boy	Breeze	
1998	54	Roland Sachs	
2000	Intrepid	Mr. Clarence	
2000	Dirk and Betty	Dirk	

=== Television ===
Year	Title	Role	Notes
1988	Star Trek: The Next Generation	Kunivas	Episode: "Heart of Glory"
1990	Parker Kane	Fishface	Television film
1990–1991	Twin Peaks	Johnny Horne	4 episodes
1991	Father Dowling Mysteries	Moe Parker	Episode: "The Malibu Mystery"
1991	Quantum Leap	Wilder	Episode: "Glitter Rock – April 12, 1974"
1992	Something to Live for: The Alison Gertz Story	Ben	Television film
1992	The Return of Spinal Tap	Lambsblood	Television film
1992–1993	Flying Blind	Jordan	22 episodes
1994	NYPD Blue	Lenny James	Episode: "Serge the Concierge"
1994	M.A.N.T.I.S.	Eddie Stokes	Episode: "The Eyes Beyond"
1995	Party of Five	Leo	Episode: "Best Laid Plans"
1999	Sabrina the Teenage Witch	Hook	2 episodes
1999	Beyond Belief: Fact or Fiction	Dale Blanken	2 episodes
1999	D.O.A.	Producer	Television film
2000	Yes, Dear	Jeff	Episode: "Talk Time"
2001	The Lot	Thomas Carey	Episode: "Nebraska Johnston"
2003	A Time to Remember	Nicholas	Television film
