= Flying Blind (TV series) =

- Genre: Sitcom
- Created by: Richard Rosenstock
- Starring: Téa Leoni; Corey Parker; Clea Lewis; Robert Bauer
- Opening theme: "A Million Miles Away" performed by David Byrne
- Composer: Jonathan Wolff
- Country of origin: United States
- Original language: English
- No. of seasons: 1
- No. of episodes: 22

Production
- Running time: 30 minutes
- Production companies: Sweetum Productions; Paramount Television; Viacom Productions

Original release
- Network: Fox
- Release: September 13, 1992 – May 2, 1993

Flying Blind is an American sitcom that aired on Fox from September 13, 1992, to May 2, 1993. The series stars Corey Parker and Téa Leoni.

== Synopsis ==
The series revolves around an awkward recent college grad, Neil Barash (Parker), who meets and starts dating a beautiful libertine woman, Alicia (Leoni), with a wild past. The show explores the difficulties faced by self-conscious and repressed Neil in dealing with the erotic antics of Alicia and her eccentric roommates, Jordan (Robert Bauer) and Megan (Clea Lewis).

In the first half of the season, Neil lives at home with his parents, and works in an office with his father. In the second half of the season, producers re-tooled the show; Neil moves in with Alicia and her roommates, and takes a job working for an unusual couple (Charles Rocket and Mary Woronov) who make low budget exploitation movies.

Veteran comedy actor Peter Boyle guest starred in two episodes as Alicia's father, a former spy. Thomas Haden Church also appeared in two episodes as Alicia's ex. In addition to Leoni, an assortment of stars had guest spots or cameos in the series before they became famous, including Diedrich Bader, Jill Hennessy, Greg Grunberg, Lisa Kudrow, Adam Ferrara, Andy Dick, Willie Garson, and Noah Emmerich.

== Cast ==
- Corey Parker as Neil Barash
- Téa Leoni as Alicia
- Cristine Rose as Ellen Barash
- Robert Bauer as Jordan
- Clea Lewis as Megan
- Marcus Giamatti as Ted Sharperson
- Michael Tucci as Jeremy Barash

== Production ==
The series was created by Richard Rosenstock, who later went on to write for Fox's Arrested Development. The theme song for the show was "A Million Miles Away", written and performed by David Byrne which appeared on his spring 1992 album release Uh-Oh.

The production companies were Sweetum Productions, and Paramount Network Television in association with (eventual corporate sibling) Viacom Productions. The series later became owned by CBS Media Ventures. Paramount received an interest in the sitcom in late August 1992.

== Episodes ==
No.	Title	Directed by	Written by	Original release date	Prod. code
1	"Pilot"	James Burrows	Richard Rosenstock	September 13, 1992	3026
Neil meets Alicia.
2	"Smiles of a Summer Night"	Michael Lembeck	Richard Rosenstock	September 20, 1992	3301
Neil and Alicia plan their first sexual encounter.
3	"Crazy for You... and You"	Michael Lembeck	Ellen Byron & Lissa Kapstrom	September 27, 1992	3304
After Neil and Alicia break up, Neil dates his high school sweetheart.
4	"Single White Eurotrash"	Michael Lembeck	Douglas Wyman	October 4, 1992	3305
The twin of Alicia's dead boyfriend moves in with Alicia.
5	"The Week of Living Dangerously"	Michael Lembeck	Bob Stevens	October 11, 1992	3302
A former boyfriend of Alicia's threatens to kill Neil.
6	"Prelude to a Brisket"	Michael Lembeck	Terri Minsky	October 18, 1992	3303
Alicia spends an evening with Neil's parents and wants to become like them.
7	"Desperately Seeking Alicia"	Dennis Erdman	Terri Minsky & Michael Borkow	October 25, 1992	3306
Neil's cousin Leslie visits and wants to be like Alicia.
8	"Lovers and Other Strangers"	Ellen Falcon	Richard Rosenstock	November 1, 1992	3307
Jonathan returns with news that he's getting married, and Alicia doesn't believe him.
9	"The Heartbreak Id"	Peter Bonerz	Bob Stevens	November 8, 1992	3308
When Neil and Alicia have problems in bed, Alicia goes into therapy.
10	"The Secret of My Great Dress"	Ellen Falcon	Ellen Byron & Lissa Kapstrom	November 15, 1992	3309
Alicia becomes a fashion designer and has no free time for Neil.
11	"A Woman Under the Influence"	Peter Bonerz	Richard Rosenstock	November 22, 1992	3310
Alicia is jealous when Neil flirts with the Hochman Fudge Girl.
12	"Dad"	Ellen Falcon	Bob Stevens	December 13, 1992	3311
Alicia's Dad returns to terrorize her current boyfriend.
13	"Ted Over Heels"	Ellen Falcon	Linwood Boomer	January 10, 1993	3312
After Ted ruins his career at Hochman Foods, Megan instantly becomes attracted to him.
14	"Panic in Neil's Park"	Stan Daniels	Richard Rosenstock	February 7, 1993	3313
Neil is fired from Hochman Foods and begins searching for a new career.
15	"The Player"	James Widdoes	Terri Minsky	February 14, 1993	3314
Neil accidentally interrupts a movie shoot and is hired by the director.
16	"Escape to New York"	Jeff Melman	Michael Borkow	March 7, 1993	3315
Neil moves in with Alicia, but it may ruin their relationship.
17	"My Dinner with Brad Schimmel"	Stan Daniels	Rick Copp & David A. Goodman	March 14, 1993	3316
Neil uses Alicia to impress an old rival.
18	"Unforgiving"	Jeff Melman	Terri Minsky	March 21, 1993	3317
Meg gets back at Alicia by writing a B-movie about her.
19	"The Bride of Marsh Man 2: The Spawning"	Jeff Melman	Mark Reisman	March 28, 1993	3318
Alicia agrees to reprise her role as Bride of the Marsh Man, but only if Neil directs.
20	"The Spy Who Came in from the Old"	Joshua White	Tom Maxwell & Don Woodard	April 11, 1993	3319
Alicia's dad announces that he's leaving the spy game and getting married.
21	"The People That Time Forgot"	Peter Bonerz	Rick Copp & David A. Goodman	April 25, 1993	3320
Neil has to choose between an art opening with Alicia and a sports memorabilia show with an old high school friend.
22	"The Long Goodbye"	Peter Bonerz	Michael Borkow and Ellen Byron & Lissa Kapstrom	May 2, 1993	3321
Neil and Alicia break up after Neil reads Alicia's diary.

== Reception ==
The series got generally favourable notices upon its debut. Ken Tucker gave the show a B+ in Entertainment Weekly, "Flying Blind's pilot episode is so well written, so zippily sexy, that it immediately stands out among Fox's usual run of self-consciously crude comedies. But even if it soon crashes and burns, this pilot for Flying Blind is easily one of the best debut shows of the year." People also graded the pilot a B+ and stated "The show may never again attain the sustained comic brilliance of last week's pilot. But this is a rarity for Fox: a sophisticated and clever sitcom." Howard Rosenberg of the Los Angeles Times wrote "It's not only the episode's sharp writing but also its eroticism and its balance between the naivete and predictability of Neil and the spontaneity and instability of Alicia that give "Flying Blind" its uniqueness. What a nice beginning." Mike Duffy of the Detroit Free Press wrote, "Rosenstock has a terrific sense of irreverent non-sexist humor, the sort of contemporary, self-deprecating wit that makes Neil and the outlandishly attractive Alicia most enjoyable. Plus, Flying Blind stars Parker and Leoni share a very nifty comic chemistry in this hip, fast-talking and contemporary romance." The show only lasted one year and has never been released on DVD. Joel Keller of The Huffington Post remarked "I'm not sure why the show only lasted one year, given the talent both in front of and behind the camera (James Burrows directed some episodes, and Linwood Boomer was one of the writers). But when it was on the air, it was mostly an enjoyable show to watch."
