= Dinner with Don =

- Genre: Talk show
- Written by: Bobby Bauer & Wayne Federman
- Story by: Bobby Bauer, Tony Opendisano, Don Rickles
- Directed by: Bobby Bauer
- Composer: Jay Gruska
- Country of origin: United States
- Original language: English
- No. of seasons: 1
- No. of episodes: 13

Production
- Executive producers: Bobby Bauer; Jeffrey Eagle; Tony Opedisano; Michael Guarnera; Vincent DeSalvo; Don Rickles; Joseph Uliano
- Producers: Dawn Hoffman, Wayne Federman
- Cinematography: David Waldman
- Editor: Andrew Ratzlaff
- Running time: 7–10 minutes
- Production companies: Stamper Lumber Company; AARP Studios; Winbrook Entertainment; Wynnefield Productions; Black Label Content

Original release
- Network: YouTube
- Release: September 25, 2017

Dinner with Don directed by Bobby Bauer, is an American web television talk show starring Don Rickles interviewed by a group host of celebrities. The series was produced by Stamper Lumber Company and the first production from AARP Studios and the final project of Rickles' career. It premiered on September 25, 2017 on YouTube.

== Premise ==
Dinner with Don features "Rickles dining with friends and fellow comedians at some of his favorite LA-area restaurants, with a guest list that includes Billy Crystal, Zach Galifianakis, Robert De Niro, Jimmy Kimmel, Amy Poehler, Vince Vaughn, Paul Rudd, Marisa Tomei and Martin Scorsese. The series also featured archives and footage from guest’s personal archives whenever possible."

== Production ==
=== Development ===
On March 20, 2017, it was announced that AARP had formed their own production company called AARP Studios. It was further reported that the company's first production would be a series created by C.Scot Cru, Bobby Bauer, Tony Oppedisano, Michael Guarnera, starring comedian Don Rickles entitled Dinner with Don. The first and second season consists of thirteen episodes and feature guests including Billy Crystal, Robert De Niro, Jimmy Kimmel, Amy Poehler, Vince Vaughn, Paul Rudd, Marisa Tomei, and Martin Scorsese. The series was set to be executive produced by C. Scot Cru, Robert Bauer and Tony Oppedisano. Presenting production company was Stamper Lumber Company, in association with Winbrook Entertainment, and Wynnefield Productions.

=== Filming ===
Principal photography for the series took place in Los Angeles, California at various restaurants including Craig's, Dan Tana's, Madeo, and the Palm.

=== Marketing ===
Following Rickles' death, AARP released the first footage from the series.

== Episodes ==
No.	Title	Featured guest(s)	Original release date
1	"Jimmy Kimmel Goes Deep With Don Rickles"	Jimmy Kimmel	September 25, 2017
2	"Amy Poehler Cracks Up Don Rickles"	Amy Poehler	September 25, 2017
3	"Snoop Dogg Raps With Don Rickles"	Snoop Dogg	September 25, 2017
4	"Paul Rudd Chews the Fat With Don Rickles"	Paul Rudd	September 25, 2017
5	"Judd Apatow Fanboys Over Don Rickles"	Judd Apatow	September 25, 2017
6	"Sarah Silverman Crushes On Don Rickles"	Sarah Silverman	September 25, 2017
7	"Vince Vaughn Goes Old School With Don Rickles"	Vince Vaughn	September 25, 2017
8	"Jonathan Silverman Reconnects With Don Rickles"	Jonathan Silverman	September 25, 2017
9	"Zach Galifianakis Trades Jabs With Don Rickles"	Zach Galifianakis	September 25, 2017
10	"Rich Eisen Talks Sports With Don Rickles"	Rich Eisen	September 25, 2017
11	"Billy Crystal Talks Rat Pack With Don Rickles"	Billy Crystal	September 25, 2017
12	"Marisa Tomei Talks Life and Love With Don Rickles"	Marisa Tomei	September 25, 2017
13	"Robert De Niro and Martin Scorsese Reminisce With Don Rickles"	Robert De Niro & Martin Scorsese	September 25, 2017

== Reception ==
=== Awards and nominations ===
Year	Ceremony	Category	Recipient(s)	Result	Ref.
2018	22nd Annual Webby Awards	Unscripted Film & Video (Branded Entertainment)	Dinner with Don	Nominated	
2018	39th Annual Telly Awards	Online: Series: Webseries – Non-Scripted	Dinner with Don	Bronze Winner	
