= Karly Rothenberg =

American film and television actress

- Born: 1962 (age 62–63); Denver, Colorado, U.S.
- Occupation: Actress
- Years active: 1986–present
- Website: www.karlyrothenberg.com

Karly Rothenberg (born 1962) is an American film and television actress. Rothenberg is best known for her roles as warehouse worker Madge “Pudge” Madsen on The Office and Ms. Erin Shapiro in the Netflix mockumentary American Vandal. She played Marlene, the secretary to Lt. Felix Valdez on the Lifetime series The Protector. She also had a recurring role as Mrs. Valentine on That's So Raven.

== Filmography ==
=== Film ===
Year	Title	Role	Notes
1987	Extreme Prejudice	Woman in Bank	Uncredited
2004	Win a Date with Tad Hamilton!	Piggly Wiggly Shopper	Uncredited
2005	Kicking & Screaming	Jack's Mother	
2006	Half Empty	Helen	
2006	Pirates of the Caribbean: Dead Man's Chest	Cantina Wench	Uncredited
2012	Congratulations	Unruly Woman	
2015	Martyrs	Nun	Voice; uncredited
2016	Mascots	Mindy's Mother	

=== Television ===
Year	Title	Role	Notes
1986	The Last Frontier	Woman on Beach	Television film
1986	When the Bough Breaks	Camp Counselor	Television film
1999	Judging Amy	Mrs. Murphy	Episode: "Presumed Innocent"
2003	Threat Matrix	Mom in Van Explosion	Episode: "Pilot"
2003	A Time to Remember	Cousin Connie	Television film
2004	Blue Collar TV	Biker Chick	Episode: "TV"
2005	Jane Doe: Vanishing Act	Heather Turnball	Television film
2005	7th Heaven	Linda	2 episodes
2005	Arrested Development	Woman #1	Episode: "Motherboy XXX"
2005	The Comeback	Hospital Nurse	Episode: "Valerie Gets a Magazine Cover"
2005	Close to Home	Counselor #2	Episode: "Romeo and Juliet Murders"
2005	Curb Your Enthusiasm	Carol	Episode: "The Seder"
2005–2011	The Office	Madge	7 episodes
2006	Where There's a Will	Loretta Baxter	Television film
2006	Big Love	Waitress	Episode: "A Barbecue for Betty"
2006	That's So Raven	Mrs. Valentine	3 episodes
2006	What I Did for Love	Woman #1	Television film
2007	Weeds	Nascar Woman	Episode: "A Pool and His Money"
2007	Pushing Daisies	Becky	Episode: "Pigeon"
2008	Prison Break	Clerk	Episode: "Blow Out"
2009	Ice Dream	Landlady	Television film
2009	It's Always Sunny in Philadelphia	Another Mom	Episode: "A Very Sunny Christmas"
2010	Desperate Housewives	Woman in Prison	Episode: "Remember Paul?"
2011	The Protector	Marlene	5 episodes
2011	Grey's Anatomy	Ruth Bennet	Episode: "Take the Lead"
2011	NCIS	Female Passerby	Episode: "Enemy on the Hill"
2011	The Middle	Woman	Episode: "Halloween II"
2011	Body of Proof	Nurse	Episode: "Your Number's Up"
2012	Justified	Nurse	Episode: "Guy Walks Into a Bar"
2012	Go On	Middle Aged Woman	Episode: "Back, Back, Back... It's Gone!"
2013	Criminal Minds	Leah Rollins	Episode: "The Return"
2013	Bones	Heather Carp	Episode: "The Fury in the Jury"
2014	Bad Teacher	Lonnie	Episode: "Nix the Fat Week"
2015	Hot in Cleveland	Jessica #2	Episode: "Family Affair"
2015	How Not to Propose	Server	Television film
2016	Crowded	Marie	Episode: "Daughter"
2016	Superstore	Sock Customer	Episode: "Olympics"
2016	One Mississippi	Store Manager	Episode: "The Cat's Out"
2016	Code Black	Prison Medic	Episode: "What Lies Beneath"
2017	Atypical	Donna	Episode: "That's My Sweatshirt"
2017	American Vandal	Ms. Shapiro	7 episodes
2017	Young Sheldon	Mrs. Veazey	Episode: "A Patch, a Modem, and a Zantac"
2017–2018	Speechless	Crossing Guard	5 episodes
2018	Mom	Ms. Harrington	Episode: "Charlotte Bronte and a Backhoe"
2018	Young & Hungry	Ronnie	Episode: "Young & Motorcycle"
2018	Homecoming	Customer 2	Episode: "Work"
2019	Grace and Frankie	Renee	Episode: "The Retreat"
2019	One Day at a Time	Mrs. Homer	Episode: "Anxiety"
2019	The Resident	Marilyn Spoelstra	Episode: "Adverse Events"
2019	American Princess	Nancy	Episode: "Down There"
2019	Veronica Mars	Mama Carr	Episode: "Chino and the Man"
2019	Threat Level Midnight: The Movie	Bar Patron	Television short
2019–2020	Archibald's Next Big Thing	Dixie / Snail / Crostini	5 episodes
2020	This Is Us	Nurse	Episode: "After the Fire"
2020	Kipo and the Age of Wonderbeasts	Cappuccino	Episode: "The Ballad of Brunchington Beach"
2020	A.P. Bio	Agatha	Episode: "Mr. Pistachio"
2021	Ronstadt	Two-faced Woman / Bone Caller	2 episodes

=== Video games ===
Year	Title	Role
2005	From Russia with Love	Rosa Klebb / Miss Moneypenny / Party Guests
2006	Open Season	Miss Feathers / Mariska
2012	Prototype 2	Additional voices
