= Jodi Shilling =

American actress (born 1979)

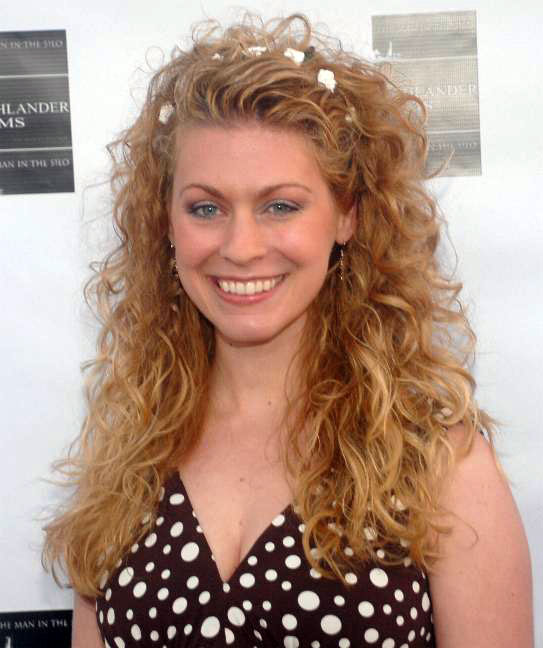
- Shilling at the premiere of The Man in the Silo
- Born: February 4, 1979 (age 46); Los Angeles, California, U.S.
- Occupation(s): Actor and owner of Releve Studios, a dance studio for young dancers ages 3-17.
- Website: relevestudios.com

Jodi Shilling (born February 4, 1979, in California) is an American actress who is currently best known for her recurring role as Tiffany on the Disney Channel Original SeriesThat's So Raven. As well as her dance studio, Releve Studios.

== Actress-Filmography ==
- Comedy Central Laughs for Life Telethon 2003 (2003) as Jessica
- Comedy Central Laughs for Life Telethon 2004 (2004) as Jessica
- A New Tomorrow (2005) (post-production) as Amber
- That's So Raven as Tiffany
- One Foot in, One Foot Out (2006) as Jillian
- A New Tomorrow (2007) as Amber
- 12 Miles of Bad Road
- Wreck the Halls (2008)
- Short Track (2008)
- The Man in the Silo (2008)
- Hannah Montana (2008) as Robin
