= Pilot (Twin Peaks) =

Pilot episode of Twin Peaks

- Twin Peaks episode
- Sheriff Truman, Dr. Hayward, and Pete Martell stand over the plastic-wrapped body of Laura Palmer. This scene reverses the peaceful atmosphere set by the beginning of the episode.
- Episode no.: Season 1 Episode 1
- Directed by: David Lynch
- Written by: David Lynch; Mark Frost
- Production code: 1.000
- Original air date: April 8, 1990
- Running time: 94 minutes

Guest appearances
- Russ Tamblyn as Dr. Lawrence Jacoby; Eric Da Re as Leo Johnson; Mary Jo Deschanel as Eileen Hayward; Harry Goaz as Deputy Sheriff Andy Brennan; Gary Hershberger as Mike Nelson; Michael Horse as Deputy Sheriff Tommy 'Hawk' Hill; Grace Zabriskie as Sarah Palmer; Troy Evans as Principal George Wolchezk; John Boylan as Mayor Dwayne Milford; Rodney Harvey as Biker Scotty; Sheryl Lee as Laura Palmer; Robert Davenport as Johnny Horne; Jan D'Arcy as Sylvia Horne; Kimmy Robertson as Lucy Moran; Jessica Wallenfels as Harriet Hayward; Wendy Robie as Nadine Hurley; Don Davis as Major Garland Briggs; Charlotte Stewart as Betty Briggs; Phoebe Augustine as Ronette Pulaski; Catherine E. Coulson as Margaret Lanterman / "The Log Lady"; Al Strobel as "The One-Armed Man"; Andrea Hays as Heidi; Frank Silva as Killer BOB (uncredited)

Episode chronology
← Previous —	Next → "Episode 1"

The pilot episode of the surrealist mystery horror drama television series Twin Peaks, also known as "Northwest Passage" and "Episode 0", premiered on ABC on Sunday, April 8, 1990. It was written by series creators Mark Frost and David Lynch, and directed by Lynch. The pilot follows the characters of Dale Cooper and Harry S. Truman as they investigate the death of popular high school student Laura Palmer; Cooper believes the murder has connections to a murder case that occurred a year earlier. In addition to setting the tone for the show, the episode sets up several character and story arcs and marked the appearance of several recurring characters. The episode received a strong Nielsen household rating compared to other season one episodes, and was well received by fans and critics alike. It is widely regarded as one of the greatest television episodes of all time. The original title for the series was Northwest Passage, but this was later changed.

== Plot overview ==
The small northwest town of Twin Peaks, Washington is shaken when the body of Laura Palmer is discovered washed up on a riverbank, wrapped in plastic. FBI Special Agent Dale Cooper (Kyle MacLachlan) is called in when Ronnette Pulaski, who attended the same high school as Palmer, is found wandering on a bridge before lapsing into a coma. Cooper believes there is a connection between Palmer's death and the death of another girl named Teresa Banks that happened a year earlier. Cooper discovers a small piece of paper with the letter "R" on it shoved under Laura's fingernail. He tells Sheriff Harry S. Truman (Michael Ontkean) that under Banks's nail he found a "T". Meanwhile, the Palmer family and friends struggle to come to terms with her death, and wonder how it might have come about. Secretary Lucy (Kimmy Robertson) is the liaison with the sheriff's office. Truman's deputies are Hawk (Michael Horse) and Andy (Harry Goaz).

Laura's parents, Leland (Ray Wise) and Sarah (Grace Zabriskie), are in a state of severe shock throughout the story.

Believing that this is the same killer who struck the previous year, Cooper starts an official investigation. Meanwhile, the rebellious Audrey Horne (Sherilyn Fenn) ruins a business deal for her father Benjamin Horne (Richard Beymer); Sheriff Truman arrests Laura's boyfriend Bobby Briggs (Dana Ashbrook), who is secretly seeing a married waitress named Shelly Johnson (Mädchen Amick); Laura's best friend Donna Hayward (Lara Flynn Boyle) and Laura's secret boyfriend James Hurley (James Marshall) discover a mutual attraction; and Sarah is terrified by a nightmare of a hand digging into the ground and grabbing James's half of a necklace that belonged to Laura. The broadcast version of the episode ends here.

A longer version was prepared in case the series was not picked up by the networks. This appended 20 minutes of footage to resolve the plot and allow the edit to be released in international markets as a television movie. In this version, instead of a nightmare, Sarah sees a man staring from behind her bed. She screams, and the man's vision soon disappears. Leland tells Lucy, who is at home with Andy, that Sarah allegedly saw Laura's killer. At the same time, Cooper receives a call from the one-armed man they had previously encountered at the hospital, who tells him he's waiting to meet him at the hospital. Immediately after, Lucy calls Cooper and Truman, who is driving home in police car, reporting Sarah's vision. Cooper, Truman, Hawk, and Andy arrive at the hospital. In the morgue, they find the one-armed man, who tells them his name is Mike (Al Strobel), and Laura's killer is Bob. Truman shows a composite sketch based on Sarah's description. Mike recognizes Bob and says Bob is now in the hospital basement. They go down to the basement, where Bob (Frank Silva) is performing a shamanic ritual. Bob says he will kill again, after which Mike bursts into the basement and shoots Bob. Bob dies, and Mike has a seizure. Afterward, we're shown a scene in the red room with an aged Cooper, the dwarf, and Laura, which will be featured in the second episode.

== Production ==
=== Conception and writing ===
David Lynch and Mark Frost pitched the idea to ABC during the time of the Writers Guild of America, East strike in 1988 in a ten-minute meeting with the network's drama head, Chad Hoffman, with nothing more than this image and a concept. According to the director, the mystery of who killed Laura Palmer was initially going to be in the foreground, but would recede gradually as viewers got to know the other townsfolk and the problems they were having. Lynch and Frost wanted to mix a police investigation with a soap opera.

ABC liked the idea, and asked Lynch and Frost to write a screenplay for the pilot episode. Frost wrote more verbal characters, like Benjamin Horne, while Lynch was responsible for Agent Dale Cooper. According to the director, "He says a lot of the things I say". Originally, the show was entitled Northwest Passage and set in North Dakota, but the fact that a town called Northwest Passage really exists prompted a revision in the script. They filmed the pilot for $1.8 million with an agreement with ABC that they would shoot an additional "ending" to it so that it could be sold directly to video in Europe as a feature if the TV show was not picked up. However, even though ABC's Bob Iger liked the pilot, he had a tough time persuading the rest of the network brass. Iger suggested showing it to a more diverse, younger group, who liked it, and the executive subsequently convinced ABC to buy seven episodes at $1.1 million apiece. Some executives figured that the show would never get on the air, believing it would meet negative reviews from viewers and critics alike. However, Iger planned to schedule it for the spring. The final showdown occurred during a bi-coastal conference call between Iger and a room full of New York executives; Iger won, and Twin Peaks was on the air.

=== Improvised elements ===
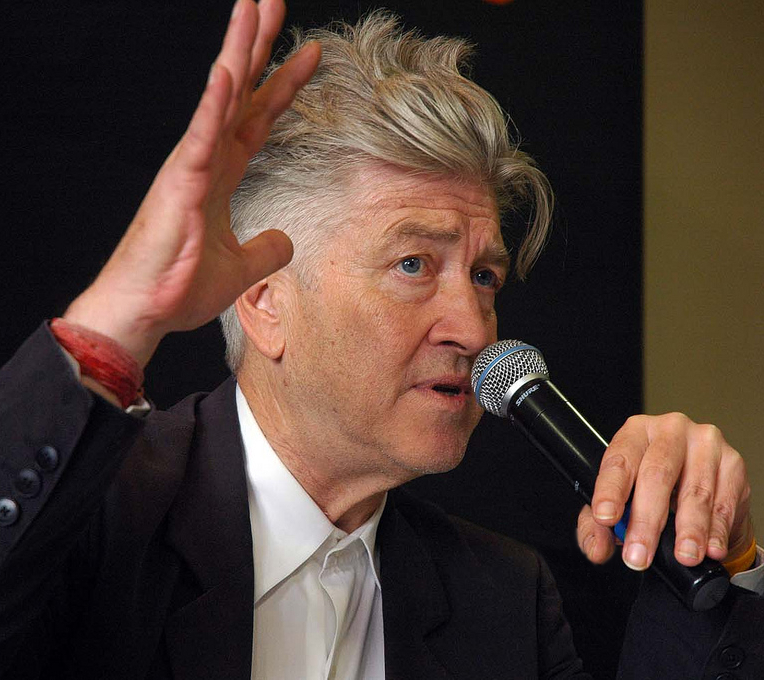
Lynch, the co-writer of the episode as seen in 2007

At several points during the filming of the pilot episode, David Lynch improvised by incorporating on-set accidents into the story. The most notable of these occurred when set decorator Frank Silva was being told to be careful to not get stuck in a room while furniture was being moved around. Lynch heard this and he says that the image of Silva being stuck intrigued him. Lynch then shot some footage of Silva perching behind Laura Palmer's bed, but was unsure as to what he would do with it. Silva was then accidentally filmed in a mirror during Sarah Palmer's vision at the end of the pilot. The camera operator insisted that Lynch do another take because of the mistake, but he liked it so much he kept it in the show, and cast Silva as Killer BOB, the mysterious tormentor of Laura Palmer.

During the filming of the scene in which Dale Cooper first examines Laura's body, a malfunctioning fluorescent light above the table flickered constantly, but Lynch decided not to replace it, since he liked the disconcerting effect that it created. Also, during the take, one of the minor actors misheard a line and, thinking he was being asked his name, he told Cooper his real name instead of saying his line, briefly throwing everyone off balance. Lynch was reportedly pleased with the lifelike, unscripted moment in dialogue, and kept the mistake in the final cut.

== Previews ==
The pilot was first shown in September 1989 at the Telluride Film Festival. That same month, Connoisseur ran a cover story calling Twin Peaks "the series that will change TV forever." After viewing the episode, Tom Shales of The Washington Post wrote: "Twin Peaks isn’t just a visit to another town; it’s a visit to another planet. Maybe it will go down in history as a brief and brave experiment. But as can be said of few other TV shows in the near or immediate future: This You Gotta See."

On February 10, 1990, it was shown as part of the Miami Film Festival. Sun-Sentinel writer Robert Hurlburt wrote: "the Lynchian sense of impending danger and kinky sexual undercurrents, coupled with excellent music, makes the Twin Peaks pilot work almost too well. You'll want to see the entire package in one sitting. But the series may lay an egg on television because of its drawn-out and deliberate pacing, brutality, sex with violence and a hint of something else ... something deadly, yet unseen and probably repulsive."

In April, a screening was also held at the Museum of Broadcasting in Hollywood. Media analyst and advertising executive Paul Schulman said: "I don't think it has a chance of succeeding. It is not commercial, it is radically different from what we as viewers are accustomed to seeing, there's no one in the show to root for."

== Release ==
=== Ratings and awards ===
The two-hour pilot was the highest-rated movie for the 1989–1990 season with a 21.7 rating and was viewed by 34.6 million people. In Los Angeles, Twin Peaks became the seventh most-watched show of the week earning 29% of viewers, the most-watched show being Married... with Children which gathered 34% of viewers. The following episode, "Traces to Nowhere" would start with a significant drop in ratings with only 23.2 million people tuning in. Various media such as The New York Times and local radio stations announced that the show had managed to grow a cult following.

For the 42nd Primetime Emmy Awards, the pilot episode was nominated six times, including "Outstanding Directing in a Drama Series" for David Lynch, "Outstanding Lead Actor in a Drama Series" for Kyle MacLachlan as Dale Cooper, and "Outstanding Writing in a Drama Series" for Mark Frost and Lynch. The pilot won two awards, with frequent Lynch collaborator Patricia Norris winning for "Outstanding Costume Design for a Series" and Duwayne Dunham winning the "Outstanding Editing for a Series - Single Camera Production". The pilot also received a Peabody Award in 1990.

The pilot's international release tells the story of the series in a self-contained manner, and includes 20 minutes of additional footage.

=== Critical reception ===
Initially, the show's Thursday night time slot was not a good one for soap operas as both Dynasty and its short-lived spin-off The Colbys did poorly. Twin Peaks was also up against the hugely successful sitcom Cheers. But the show received an initial positive response from TV critics. Tom Shales, in The Washington Post, wrote: "Twin Peaks disorients you in ways that small-screen productions seldom attempt. It's a pleasurable sensation, the floor dropping out and leaving one dangling." In The New York Times, John J. O'Connor wrote: "Twin Peaks is not a sendup of the form. Mr. Lynch clearly savors the standard ingredients...but then the director adds his own peculiar touches, small passing details that suddenly, and often hilariously, thrust the commonplace out of kilter."

Many critics saw the pilot as "the movie that will change TV" history, according to Diana White from The Boston Globe. Ken Tucker from Entertainment Weekly was strongly positive about the episode, giving it a A+. While liking the story, and calling Lynch's directing beautiful, he said "[there is] not a chance in hell" the show could become a ratings hit, because of its "unsettling" story. David Zurawik from The Baltimore Sun compared the pilot to the work of Alfred Hitchcock. He also said its cinematography was "about as close as prime-time television gets to art." Jen Chaney from The Washington Post called the pilot "one of the most finely crafted series kick-offs in broadcast history".

In 1997, TV Guide ranked the pilot #25 on its list of the 100 Greatest Episodes. In 2013, it was mentioned in the WGA's list of the 101 best written TV series where Twin Peaks came 35. In 2024, Rolling Stone listed it as the 13th best TV episode of all time.

Michael Ontkean later recalled,

Paul Newman, who was my friend, missed the broadcast of the original Twin Peaks pilot on television and was well aware of the avalanche of positive reviews. I called David [Lynch] and asked for a copy to be sent to us in New York. Paul arranged for it to be shown at a Manhattan screening room. It was just the two of us and Mike Nichols. Afterwards, Paul gathered himself, got real quiet, turned to me and said it was one of the few times in his life he had experienced a perfect movie.

=== Home video release/Alternative Extended European Pilot ===
Due to rights issues, the American pilot (94 minutes long) was not released in the United States home video market until 2007. The alternative extended European pilot (116 minutes) had been released on VHS and LaserDisc years earlier. This alternate version of the pilot was aired in Europe as a stand-alone television movie. The European version is identical to the United States-aired version up until the last several scenes, when the killer of Laura Palmer is revealed. Both versions of the pilot are included in the Twin Peaks: Definitive Gold Box Edition DVD set, released in the US on October 30, 2007. Lynch was so pleased with the footage shot for the European ending that he later incorporated some of it into Cooper's dream sequences that aired in the subsequent acclaimed Episode 2.

== See also ==
- List of television episodes listed among the best
