= Audrey Horne =

Fictional character

- Twin Peaks character
- Audrey Horne, as portrayed by Sherilyn Fenn
- First appearance: "Pilot" (1990)
- Last appearance: "Part 16" (2017)
- Created by: David Lynch and Mark Frost
- Portrayed by: Sherilyn Fenn; Victoria Jackson (SNL)

In-universe information
- Occupation: Student, saleswoman, businesswoman
- Family: Horne
- Spouse: Charlie
- Significant others: John Justice Wheeler; Billy
- Children: Richard Horne (son)
- Relatives: Ben Horne (father); Sylvia Horne (mother); Johnny Horne (brother); Donna Hayward (half-sister); Jerry Horne (uncle)
- Nationality: American
- Date of birth: August 24, 1970
- Duration: 1990–1991; 2017

Audrey Horne is a fictional character from the ABC television series Twin Peaks, played by Sherilyn Fenn. The character was created by Mark Frost and David Lynch. She was introduced in the pilot. The daughter of Ben and Sylvia Horne, sister of Johnny Horne, her storylines focused on her infatuation with the series protagonist Dale Cooper, infiltrating the brothel/casino One Eyed Jacks and becoming an activist through civil disobedience.

== Appearances ==
=== Television ===
==== Twin Peaks ====
Audrey is 18 years old during the series. She eventually discovers that her father, business magnate Benjamin Horne (Richard Beymer), was the deceased Laura Palmer's (Sheryl Lee) lover. Audrey is labeled a troublemaker and she initially lives up to that expectation. In a memorable scene in the Twin Peaks pilot, she derails one of her father's business deals, worth millions of dollars, by interrupting a meeting of Norwegian investors and telling them about Laura's murder. Although Audrey and Laura were not friends, Audrey says she "kind of loved Laura" because she tutored Audrey's intellectually disabled brother Johnny (Robert Bauer). During the first season of Twin Peaks, Audrey develops a crush on FBI Special Agent Dale Cooper (Kyle MacLachlan). She tries to help him investigate Laura's murder by infiltrating a Canadian brothel, One-Eyed Jack's, as a hostess. She remains at the brothel for several episodes that bridge the series' first and second seasons, in danger of her life, while she makes some profoundly disturbing discoveries.

In the show's second season, writers planned a serious relationship between Cooper and Audrey, but MacLachlan vetoed the plan; he argued that Cooper would not become involved with a teenaged girl. (Fenn later revealed that costar Lara Flynn Boyle, who was dating Kyle MacLachlan at the time, "put the kibosh" on Audrey and Cooper's romantic arc.) Cooper admits to Audrey during their last significant conversation that the real reason why he would not pursue her was for her own safety. In a previous FBI case, he had fallen in love with a young woman who was then murdered.

Later in the second season, Audrey flirts with Bobby Briggs (Dana Ashbrook) and then falls in love with one of her father's business associates, John Justice Wheeler (Billy Zane). She finds evidence to exonerate Cooper of charges pressed after his raid on One-Eyed Jack's. She also lets her father pressure her into entering the Miss Twin Peaks beauty pageant, for which she delivers an impassioned speech in favor of saving endangered species. In the series finale, Audrey is engaged in an act of civil disobedience at the local bank to save the local forest. After Audrey chained herself to the door of the bank vault, a bomb explodes inside the vault, a booby trap planted by the late Thomas Eckhardt (David Warner) as an ironic reward in a long treasure hunt. Andrew Packard (Dan O'Herlihy), Pete Martell (Jack Nance), and an elderly banker are the ones closest to the blast, and Audrey's fate is left ambiguous. In the finale, it is suggested that Audrey is actually the half-sister of classmate Donna Hayward (Lara Flynn Boyle), whose biological father turns out to be Benjamin Horne.

Fenn stated in an interactive chat on America Online that, if there had been a third season of the show, her character was slated to have survived the explosion.

==== Twin Peaks revival series ====
Fenn reprised her role as Audrey in the 2017 revival of Twin Peaks, first appearing in the episode "Part 12". She is unhappily married to a man named Charlie (Clark Middleton), and openly discusses her lover Billy in front of Charlie. She spends a great deal of time trying to convince Charlie to help her search for Billy, who has gone missing, at the Roadhouse. However, leaving the house proves to be surprisingly difficult, as Audrey finds herself in circumstances vaguely reminiscent of The Exterminating Angel.

Audrey and Charlie eventually manage to leave the house. At the Roadhouse, she is surprised when the house band breaks into the "Audrey's Dance" theme music featured in the original series. The dance floor clears out for her, and she begins to dance. Suddenly, a fight breaks out in the club and Audrey demands Charlie take her home. The club disappears and she finds herself in a bright white room. Once again, her fate is left ambiguous, although some critics speculated the ending was meant to suggest that she is either still in a coma, in a psychiatric hospital, or a "Lodge" similar to the one Cooper is imprisoned in at the end of season 2. Lynch has said that Audrey's eventual fate is left open to the viewer's interpretation.

In his tie-in book Twin Peaks: The Final Dossier, series co-creator Mark Frost said that the bank vault explosion put Audrey in a coma. In the revival, Doc Hayward (Warren Frost) reveals that Cooper's evil doppelgänger visited her in the hospital shortly after the bank explosion. The series implies, and the book confirms, that the doppelgänger raped her, resulting in the birth of her sociopathic son, Richard (Eamon Farren). Audrey opened a beauty salon and married her financial advisor before going into seclusion. Although Audrey's fate is not known, "one troubling rumor suggests [that she lives in] a private care facility."

== Development ==
=== Spin-off series and Mulholland Drive concept ===
Originally, Audrey was set to have a spin-off series, but it eventually was scrapped. The concept for the series turned into David Lynch's 2001 film Mulholland Drive. In David Lynch: The Man from Another Place, Dennis Lim states that "While working on Twin Peaks, Lynch and Frost also toyed with the idea of a spin-off series for Sherilyn Fenn's character, Audrey Horne, that would transplant the backwoods femme fatale to Hollywood. They planned to call it Mulholland Drive. While Lynch began to adapt the idea into a feature script, he abandoned it in order to make Lost Highway.

=== Theme music ===
Angelo Badalamenti composed the leitmotifs Audrey's Dance, Audrey's Prayer, and Audrey for the character.

== Reception ==
Sherilyn Fenn received critical acclaim for her performance as Audrey, and she received nominations for Primetime Emmy Award for Outstanding Supporting Actress in a Drama Series and a Golden Globe Award for Best Supporting Actress – Series, Miniseries or Television Film.
