= Al Strobel =

American actor (1940–2022)

- Born: Albert Michael Strobel; January 28, 1940; Madison, Wisconsin, U.S.
- Died: December 2, 2022 (aged 82); Eugene, Oregon, U.S.
- Occupation: Actor
- Years active: 1960s–2005; 2015–2017
- Notable work: Twin Peaks

Albert Michael Strobel (January 28, 1940– December 2, 2022) was an American actor best known for his recurring role on David Lynch and Mark Frost's Twin Peaks as Phillip Michael Gerard, also known as Mike.

== Early life ==
Strobel was born in Madison, Wisconsin. Strobel lost his left arm at the shoulder as a result of a car accident when he was 17 years old. While living in Oregon in the early 1970s he did theatrical work at the University of Oregon and co-founded the Church of the Creative. At the Grateful Dead's August 27, 1972, concert in Veneta he shot video which ended up in the film Sunshine Daydream.

== Career ==
Strobel starred in "scores" of local productions in Eugene, Oregon from the late 1960s right up to the early 80's. He was the star, producer and overall "moving force" behind a television dramatization of Anton Chekhov's Swansong, which aired on OEPBS and was called "a first for Oregon educational television."

Strobel was cast in Twin Peaks, the series which made him a star, without an audition or even meeting David Lynch.

Strobel appeared in the Twin Peaks series as well as Twin Peaks: Fire Walk with Me, and had roles in the films Shadow Play, Megaville, and Ricochet River (starring Kate Hudson). He appeared in productions of Romeo and Juliet, Oklahoma! and Richard III. He also appeared in the television movie Child of Darkness, Child of Light. As early as 2005 he had retired and was living in Eugene, Oregon.

In 2015, Strobel appeared in a video supporting David Lynch following his departure from the Twin Peaks revival slated for 2016, along with numerous other Twin Peaks cast members. Lynch later returned to the revival and Strobel came out of retirement to reprise his role as Philip Gerard. The new series aired on Showtime in 2017.

== Personal life and death ==
Strobel died in Eugene, Oregon, on December 2, 2022, at age 82.

== Filmography ==
=== Film ===
Year	Title	Role	Notes
1986	Shadow Play	Byron	
1990	Sitting Target	Man in Dreams	Direct-to-video
1990	Megaville	Speaker	
1992	Twin Peaks: Fire Walk with Me	Phillip Michael Gerard, a.k.a. Mike	
2001	Ricochet River	One-Armed Man	
2014	Twin Peaks: The Missing Pieces	Phillip Michael Gerard	

=== Television ===
Year	Title	Role	Notes
1989–1991	Twin Peaks	Phillip Michael Gerard, a.k.a. Mike / One-Armed Man	10 episodes
1991	Child of Darkness, Child of Light	Dr. Seville	Television film
2017	Twin Peaks	Phillip Gerard/Mike	9 episodes
