= List of awards and nominations received by Twin Peaks =

List of awards and nominations for Twin Peaks
Awards and nominations
Award	Wins	Nominations
Aftonbladets TV-pris	2	2
American Society of Cinematographers Awards	0	1
Artios Awards	1	1
BPG TV and Radio Awards	1	1
BRIT Awards	1	1
Directors Guild of America Awards	0	1
Golden Globe Awards	3	4
Grammy Awards	1	2
Los mejores de TP	1	1
Peabody Awards	1	1
Primetime Emmy Awards	2	18
Q Awards	0	1
Satellite Awards	0	1
Saturn Awards	2	2
Soap Opera Digest Awards	0	14
TCA Awards	3	10
Telegatto	1	1
TV Land Awards	0	1

Totals (Note: Certain award groups do not simply award one winner. They acknowledge several different recipients, have runners-up, and have third place. Since this is a specific recognition and is different from losing an award, runner-up mentions are considered wins in this award tally. For simplification and to avoid errors, each award in this list has been presumed to have had a prior nomination.)
- Wins: 18
- Nominations: 62

Twin Peaks is an American mystery-horror drama television series, created by David Lynch and Mark Frost, that aired on the ABC network from April 8, 1990 to June 10, 1991. The series centers on the investigation into the murder of popular schoolgirl Laura Palmer in the small rural town in Washington state after which the series is named led by FBI Special Agent Dale Cooper.

== Statistics ==
Since the broadcast of the pilot episode, Twin Peaks earned widespread critical acclaim. The show earned a BRIT Award, a Grammy Award, a Peabody Award, three Golden Globe Awards, three TCA Awards and two Primetime Emmy Awards.

Kyle MacLachlan received two nominations for the Primetime Emmy Award for Outstanding Lead Actor in a Drama Series, and won the Golden Globe Award for Best Performance by an Actor in a Television Series – Drama. Piper Laurie, who was nominated for two Primetime Emmy Awards—Outstanding Lead Actress in a Drama Series in 1990 and Outstanding Supporting Actress in a Drama Series in 1991—won the Golden Globe Award for Best Performance by an Actress in a Supporting Role in a Series, Miniseries or Motion Picture Made for Television in 1990.

== Awards and nominations ==
Awards and nominations received by Twin Peaks
Award	Year (Note: The listed year refers to the date of the ceremony, not necessarily the year in which the corresponding season or episode aired.)	Category	Nominee(s)	Result	Ref.
Aftonbladets TV-pris	1991	Best Foreign TV Program	Twin Peaks	Won	
Aftonbladets TV-pris	1991	Best Foreign TV Personality – Male	Kyle MacLachlan	Won	
American Society of Cinematographers Awards	1991	Outstanding Achievement in Cinematography in a Movie of the Week or Pilot	Ronald Víctor García (for "Northwest Passage")	Nominated	
Artios Awards	1990	Best Casting for TV, Dramatic Episodic	Johanna Ray	Won	
BPG TV and Radio Awards	1991	Best Imported TV Programme	Twin Peaks	Won	
BRIT Awards	1991	Soundtrack/Cast Recording	Soundtrack from Twin Peaks	Won	
Directors Guild of America Awards	1991	Outstanding Directorial Achievement in Dramatic Series – Night	Leslie Linka Glatter (for "Cooper's Dreams")	Nominated	
Golden Globe Awards	1991	Best Television Series – Drama	Twin Peaks	Won	
Golden Globe Awards	1991	Best Performance by an Actor in a Television Series – Drama	Kyle MacLachlan	Won	
Golden Globe Awards	1991	Best Performance by an Actress in a Supporting Role in a Series, Miniseries or Motion Picture Made for Television	Piper Laurie	Won	
Golden Globe Awards	1991	Best Performance by an Actress in a Supporting Role in a Series, Miniseries or Motion Picture Made for Television	Sherilyn Fenn	Nominated	
Grammy Awards	1991	Best Pop Instrumental Performance	Angelo Badalamenti (for "Twin Peaks Theme")	Won	
Grammy Awards	1991	Best Instrumental Composition Written for a Motion Picture or Television	Angelo Badalamenti (for Soundtrack from Twin Peaks)	Nominated	
Los mejores de TP	1991	Best Foreign Series	Twin Peaks	Won	
Peabody Awards	1991	Honoree (Note: Presented to Lynch/Frost Productions in association with Propaganda Films and Worldvision Enterprises) (Note: Twin Peaks won the Peabody for the episode "Northwest Passage.")		Honored	
Primetime Emmy Awards	1990	Outstanding Drama Series	Twin Peaks (Note: Nominees: Gregg Fienberg, Mark Frost, David J. Latt, David Lynch)	Nominated	
Primetime Emmy Awards	1990	Outstanding Lead Actor in a Drama Series	Kyle MacLachlan	Nominated	
Primetime Emmy Awards	1990	Outstanding Lead Actress in a Drama Series	Piper Laurie	Nominated	
Primetime Emmy Awards	1990	Outstanding Supporting Actress in a Drama Series	Sherilyn Fenn (for "Northwest Passage," "Zen, or the Skill to Catch a Killer" and "Realization Time")	Nominated	
Primetime Emmy Awards	1990	Outstanding Directing in a Drama Series	David Lynch (for "Northwest Passage")	Nominated	
Primetime Emmy Awards	1990	Outstanding Writing in a Drama Series	David Lynch, Mark Frost (for "Northwest Passage")	Nominated	
Primetime Emmy Awards	1990	Outstanding Writing in a Drama Series	Harley Peyton (for "Rest in Pain")	Nominated	
Primetime Emmy Awards	1991	Outstanding Lead Actor in a Drama Series	Kyle MacLachlan (for "Arbitrary Law")	Nominated	
Primetime Emmy Awards	1991	Outstanding Supporting Actress in a Drama Series	Piper Laurie (for "Demons" and "Masked Ball")	Nominated	
Primetime Creative Arts Emmy Awards	1990	Outstanding Achievement in Costuming for a Series	Patricia Norris (for "Northwest Passage")	Won	
Primetime Creative Arts Emmy Awards	1990	Outstanding Achievement in Main Title Theme Music	Angelo Badalamenti, David Lynch	Nominated	
Primetime Creative Arts Emmy Awards	1990	Outstanding Achievement in Music and Lyrics	Angelo Badalamenti (music), David Lynch (lyrics) (for "Into the Night")	Nominated	
Primetime Creative Arts Emmy Awards	1990	Outstanding Achievement in Music Composition for a Series (Dramatic Underscore)	Angelo Badalamenti (for "Traces to Nowhere")	Nominated	
Primetime Creative Arts Emmy Awards	1990	Outstanding Art Direction for a Series	Patricia Norris, Leslie Morales (for "Northwest Passage")	Nominated	
Primetime Creative Arts Emmy Awards	1990	Outstanding Editing for a Series (Single-Camera Production)	Duwayne Dunham (for "Northwest Passage")	Won	
Primetime Creative Arts Emmy Awards	1990	Outstanding Sound Editing for a Series	John A. Larsen, Matt Sawelson, John Haeny, Pat McCormick, Albert Edmund Lord III, Fred Cipriano, Bruce P. Michaels, Lori L. Eschler (for "The Last Evening")	Nominated	
Primetime Creative Arts Emmy Awards	1991	Outstanding Sound Editing for a Series	Richard Taylor, Pat McCormick, Richard F.W. Davis, Thomas DeGorter, Albert Edmund Lord III, Lori L. Eschler (for "On the Wings of Love")	Nominated	
Primetime Creative Arts Emmy Awards	1991	Outstanding Sound Mixing for a Drama Series	Don Summer, Gary Alexander, Adam Jenkins (for "On the Wings of Love")	Nominated	
Q Awards	1991	Best Actor in a Quality Drama Series	Kyle MacLachlan	Nominated	
Satellite Awards	2007	Best DVD Release of a TV Show	Twin Peaks (for Season 2)	Nominated	
Saturn Awards	2008	Best Retro Television Series on DVD	Twin Peaks: The Definitive Gold Box Edition	Won	
Saturn Awards	2015	Best DVD or Blu-ray Television Series	Twin Peaks: The Entire Mystery	Won	
Soap Opera Digest Awards	1991	Outstanding Prime-Time Show	Twin Peaks	Nominated	
Soap Opera Digest Awards	1991	Outstanding Lead Actor – Prime-Time	Kyle MacLachlan	Nominated	
Soap Opera Digest Awards	1991	Outstanding Supporting Actor – Prime-Time	Everett McGill	Nominated	
Soap Opera Digest Awards	1991	Outstanding Supporting Actress – Prime-Time	Mädchen Amick	Nominated	
Soap Opera Digest Awards	1991	Outstanding Supporting Actress – Prime-Time	Peggy Lipton	Nominated	
Soap Opera Digest Awards	1991	Outstanding Hero – Prime-Time	Michael Ontkean	Nominated	
Soap Opera Digest Awards	1991	Outstanding Heroine – Prime-Time	Lara Flynn Boyle	Nominated	
Soap Opera Digest Awards	1991	Outstanding Villain – Prime-Time	Richard Beymer	Nominated	
Soap Opera Digest Awards	1991	Outstanding Villainess – Prime-Time	Piper Laurie	Nominated	
Soap Opera Digest Awards	1991	Outstanding Storyline – Prime-Time	Who killed Laura Palmer?	Nominated	
Soap Opera Digest Awards	1992	Outstanding Prime-Time Show	Twin Peaks	Nominated	
Soap Opera Digest Awards	1992	Outstanding Actor – Prime-Time	Kyle MacLachlan	Nominated	
Soap Opera Digest Awards	1992	Outstanding Actress – Prime-Time	Piper Laurie	Nominated	
Soap Opera Digest Awards	1992	Best Death Scene – Prime-Time	Sheryl Lee as Maddy Ferguson	Nominated	
TCA Awards	1990	Program of the Year	Twin Peaks	Won	
TCA Awards	1990	Outstanding Achievement in Drama	Twin Peaks	Won	
TCA Awards	2010	Heritage Award		Nominated	
TCA Awards	2011	Heritage Award		Nominated	
TCA Awards	2012	Heritage Award		Nominated	
TCA Awards	2013	Heritage Award		Nominated	
TCA Awards	2014	Heritage Award		Nominated	
TCA Awards	2015	Heritage Award		Nominated	
TCA Awards	2016	Heritage Award		Nominated	
TCA Awards	2024	Heritage Award		Won	
Telegatto	1991	Best Foreign TV Series	Twin Peaks	Won	
TV Land Awards	2006	Favorite Dream Sequence	Dream sequences featuring "The Man From Another Place"	Nominated	
