= Part 3 (Twin Peaks) =

- Twin Peaks episode
- Special Agent Dale Cooper (Kyle MacLachlan) and Naido (Nae Yūki) on the top of the structure floating into space. The scene has received critical acclaim, and was compared by many critics to the surreal sequences in Lynch's Eraserhead.
- Episode no.: Season 3 Episode 3
- Directed by: David Lynch
- Written by: David Lynch; Mark Frost
- Cinematography by: Peter Deming
- Editing by: Duwayne Dunham
- Original air dates: May 21, 2017 (Showtime Anytime); May 28, 2017 (TV Broadcast)
- Running time: 58 minutes

Guest appearances
- Phoebe Augustine as American Girl; Chrysta Bell as Special Agent Tammy Preston; Don S. Davis as Major Garland Briggs; John Ennis as Slot Machine Man; Miguel Ferrer as Special Agent Albert Rosenfield; Brian Finney as Security Guard; Meg Foster as Cashier; Hailey Gates as Drugged-out Mother; Harry Goaz as Deputy Sheriff Andy Brennan; Travis Hammer as First Trooper; Stephen Heath as Second Trooper; Michael Horse as Deputy Chief Tommy "Hawk" Hill; Sheryl Lee as Laura Palmer; David Lynch as FBI Deputy Director Gordon Cole; Josh McDermitt as Wise Guy; Linda Porter as Lady Slot-Addict; Kimmy Robertson as Lucy Brennan; Sawyer Shipman as Little Boy; Al Strobel as Phillip Michael Gerard / MIKE; Sabrina S. Sutherland as Floor Attendant Jackie; Russ Tamblyn as Dr. Lawrence Jacoby; Bill Tangradi as Jake; Greg Vrotsos as Gene; Nafessa Williams as Jade; Nae Yuuki as Naido

Episode chronology
← Previous "Part 2"	Next → "Part 4"

"Part 3", also known as "Call for Help", (Note: Episodes did not originally air with titles, but the promotional quotes for each episode were later used as titles in the Blu-ray release of this season) is the third episode of the third season of the American surrealist mystery horror drama television series Twin Peaks. It was written by series creators Mark Frost and David Lynch, directed by Lynch, and stars Kyle MacLachlan.

"Part 3" was released on Showtime's streaming service Showtime Anytime, along with "Part 4", on May 21, 2017, immediately after the broadcast of the double premiere; it was eventually broadcast on Showtime on May 28, 2017, and was seen by an audience of 195,000 viewers in the United States. Critics widely praised the episode for its opening sequence and overall surreal atmosphere, while audiences were more divided on the latter aspect.

== Plot ==
Call for help.

— Dale Cooper (used as a promotional tagline for the episode)

=== Background ===
The small town of Twin Peaks, Washington, has been shocked by the murder of schoolgirl Laura Palmer (Sheryl Lee) and the attempted murder of her friend Ronette Pulaski (Phoebe Augustine). FBI special agent Dale Cooper (Kyle MacLachlan) has been sent to the town to investigate and has discovered that the killer was Laura's father, Leland Palmer (Ray Wise), who acted while possessed by a demonic entity, Killer BOB (Frank Silva). At the end of the original series, BOB trapped Cooper in the Black Lodge, an extra-dimensional place, and let out Cooper's doppelgänger to use him for physical access to the world. 25 years later, Cooper's doppelgänger roams freely through the world, with Cooper still inside the Lodge. Laura tells Cooper that he is free to go, but while he roams the Lodge, one of the statues turns into the doppelgänger of the Arm (Note: The original actor for the arm, Michael J. Anderson, did not return to the role. The voice actor for the arm is uncredited.) and opens up the floor, causing Cooper to fall into space. He eventually lands on a glass box in New York City; he is absorbed by it and floats inside, only to disappear before the box's absent guardian, Sam Colby (Benjamin Rosenfield), returns with Tracey Barberato (Madeline Zima).

=== Events ===
Cooper continues to descend through space. He eventually lands on a balcony; looking outside, he observes a purple ocean stretching as far as he can see. Cooper enters the building through a set of windows; inside, in a nightmarish blur, a woman with scars on her face and large patches of skin over her eyes (Nae Yūki) sits in front of a lit fireplace. Cooper asks the woman where they are, but she responds only with disjointed, high-pitched breath noises. A loud pounding is heard, as if something very powerful is trying to enter the room, and the woman signals Cooper to be quiet. He notices a large electrical throw-switch mechanism on the wall labeled with the number 15, but she keeps him away from it and leads him up a ladder. They reach the roof, where the structure they had been inside appears as a metallic cuboid floating in space with a bell-shaped mechanism on its top. The woman throws a switch on the mechanism and receives an electric shock, which throws her into the void but makes the hitherto blurred reality come into focus. After she has fallen out of sight, Garland Briggs's (Don S. Davis) head floats under the structure and says "Blue rose." Cooper walks back downstairs and encounters another woman (played by Phoebe Augustine, who played Ronette Pulaski in the original series of Twin Peaks but is listed in the episode's credits as "American Girl") sitting in front of the fireplace. Cooper approaches her while she checks her wristwatch; as the watch strikes 2:53, the mechanism on the wall, now labeled with the number 3, begins to hum, and a light on a coffee table turns on.

In South Dakota, Cooper's doppelgänger is driving along a deserted road when he begins to feel uncomfortable. The cigarette lighter in his car begins to exercise an electric force on him. Cooper observes the mechanism as the woman by the fireplace tells him, "When you get there, you will already be there;" he approaches the machinery, but recoils when his face begins to deform. He continues to feel uncomfortable, while back in the purple room, more insistent pounding is heard, and the American Girl tells Cooper to leave because her mother is coming. Cooper approaches the throw-switch mechanism again, and it begins to suck him into itself, elongating and deforming his body and leaving only his shoes behind. The doppelgänger begins to lose consciousness and loses control of the car, crashing on the side of the road. He gags, but holds back his vomit; as the cigarette lighter continues to exercise the force over him, red drapes faintly appear in front of him.

In a house for sale in the Rancho Rosa estates, Las Vegas, Dougie Jones, a man physically identical to Cooper but for his weight, hair and clothes (MacLachlan) sits with prostitute Jade (Nafessa Williams) on his lap, saying that his arm (on which he wears the Owl Cave ring) feels "tingly." Jade takes her payment and proceeds to shower; Dougie gets out of bed only to experience greater pain and weakness. He falls down, as the doppelgänger continues to hold his mouth in South Dakota. Dougie crawls down the corridor, and tries entering the bathroom, but Jade has locked the door. He proceeds to move toward an electric socket, which exercises a force on him. As red curtains faintly appear in front of him, Dougie vomits and is transported away with a loud noise, which at last alerts Jade. The red curtains fade away and the doppelgänger vomits a mixture of creamed corn and engine oil and passes out. In the Black Lodge, Dougie is seated before MIKE (Al Strobel), who explains that someone manufactured him for a purpose. Dougie's hand begins to shrink, and the ring falls down; his heads pops out with a hiss, producing black smoke, and a golden orb floats out of it. Dougie's body deflates; an egglike object appears, prompting MIKE to shield its sight. The object deflates, letting a golden orb fly out of it; the orb and the object collide on the armchair, which produces smoke and a loud electrical crackling noise. When MIKE looks back, a small golden orb is on the chair; he picks it up along with the ring, which he proceeds to put on a pedestal.

In the house, a cloud of black smoke pours out of the socket and materializes into Cooper on the ground near Dougie's vomit. Jade exits the shower, and takes Cooper for Dougie; she is surprised to see him in a suit, with less weight and different hair, but is disgusted by the vomit and suggests that he could be sick. Cooper does not seem to react to her, and stands up or moves only when pushed. He exits the house with Jade, who notices that he is not wearing any shoes and tells him to go back and put them on; as he does not react, she walks back inside and takes them for him, only for him to follow her back in again. Jade eventually fastens his shoes for him and begins to take his nonresponsive state for granted; when searching his pockets for his car keys, she can find only the key to Cooper's room in the Great Northern Hotel, which puzzles and upsets her, as she now has to drive him back.

As the duo drive away, Gene (Bill Tangradi), a paid killer, parks in front of the house, and Jake (Greg Vrotsos), his partner, says he is ready to shoot him if they pass by the entrance. Jade tells Cooper to call AAA as soon as he finds a wallet or some money; when they pass through Sycamore Street, he takes out the key to his room and begins to observe it. When the car hits a bump, the key falls, and Cooper bends down to take it, so Jake does not see him as they pass. Cooper eventually gets up without the key; as Gene is told that Dougie did not leave Rancho Rosa, he puts an explosive device under Dougie's car and drives away. A boy (Sawyer Shipman) observes the scene from his house across the street, as his drugged-out mother (Hailey Gates) repeatedly yells "One-one-nine," takes a pill with whiskey and lights a cigarette.

Two highway patrolmen reach the doppelgänger's car in South Dakota; when one of them, Billy (Travis Hammer), checks inside the car, he becomes immediately ill from the smell, prompting his partner (Stephen Heath) to call for backup. At the Twin Peaks Sheriff Station, Hawk (Michael Horse), Lucy (Kimmy Robertson) and Andy (Harry Goaz) sort through files in search for something missing that relates to Hawk's heritage. Upon seeing a box of chocolate bunnies amid the evidence, Lucy, guilt-stricken, uncomfortably admits to have eaten one of the bunnies years before to get rid of "a bubble of gas." Andy asks Hawk if Native Americans use chocolate as a remedy; Hawk responds that the investigation is not about the bunny, but thinks for a moment before deciding that the bunny is not relevant to their search. On the White Tail Peak, Lawrence Jacoby (Russ Tamblyn) spray-paints five shovels with golden paint and hangs them to dry.

Jade drops Cooper at the Silver Mustang Casino, giving him $5 and instructing him to call for help; when she orders him out of the car, Cooper remembers Laura Palmer telling him that he can go out. Cooper begins repeating "Call for help", the last thing Jade said to him, to anyone who asks or prompts him. After struggling to pass through the revolving doors, he enters the casino; he is redirected by a guard (Brian Finney) to the cashier (Meg Foster) who changes his money. Cooper walks onto the casino floor, where he observes a man (John Ennis) hitting a jackpot and exclaiming "Hellooo-ooo!". Cooper notices a floating apparition above one of the slot machines, depicting the Red Room. He approaches it and repeats the jackpot winner's behavior, gestures and exclamations of verbatim; he hits a mega-jackpot, and is complimented by another patron (Josh McDermitt) for having "broken it."

Cooper follows the apparition to another slot, again imitates the other winner and hits another mega-jackpot as an old lady (Linda Porter) stares at him in envy; the floor attendant, Jackie (Sabrina S. Sutherland), congratulates him and when Cooper says "Call for help", goes to fetch a bigger bucket. Cooper points at another slot machine with the Red Room apparition next to the old woman; angered, the woman gives him the finger. As he walks away, she covetously eyes the mega-jackpot winnings he left behind but cannot take them because the CCTVs are on, prompting her to angrily give a camera the finger. Cooper follows the floating sign to yet another slot, while Jackie returns and is told that he left; she leaves a guard to watch the winnings. Cooper plays at the machine and wins a third mega-jackpot; upon seeing this, the old woman goes to the slot machine Cooper pointed to before, wins a mega-jackpot and claps and cheers ecstatically.

At FBI headquarters in Philadelphia, Deputy Director Gordon Cole (David Lynch) and Agents Albert Rosenfield (Miguel Ferrer) and Tamara Preston (Chrysta Bell) discuss a case with five other agents: a congressman has been accused of brutally murdering his wife and claims to be innocent but unable to identify the killer as it would breach national security. He gives them instead a series of clues: a photo of a woman in bikini, a pair of pincers, a photo of two more girls in bikinis, a picture of a child in sailing attire, a machine gun and a jar of dried beans. Cole assigns all agents except Tammy to the case; he then asks her to brief him and Albert on her investigation of a double murder in New York. Tammy shows them photos from the building, including one of Sam Colby's and Tracey Barberato's mangled corpses, and the only photo the cameras have captured of the Experiment (Erica Aynon). Cole is informed that there is a call for him about Cooper, which shocks him and Albert; the three of them run into Cole's office, where he takes the call and is informed that Cooper is being held prisoner in South Dakota. He arranges for him, Albert and Tammy to leave for South Dakota the following day, then leaves the room; Albert says to Tammy, "The absurd mystery of the strange forces of existence."

In the Roadhouse, the Cactus Blossoms play their song "Mississippi."

== Production ==
"Part 3", like the rest of the limited series, was written by Mark Frost and David Lynch and directed by Lynch.

Frost had already written ten episodes of the original series—the "Pilot" and Episodes 1, 2 and 8 with Lynch, plus Episodes 5, 7, 12, 14, 16, 26, 7, and the original series finale, Episode 29. Lynch also directed six episodes of the original series—the "Pilot", "Episode 2", "Episode 8", "Episode 9", "Episode 14" and "Episode 29".

The mysterious entity credited as "American Girl" looks like Ronette Pulaski and is also played by Phoebe Augustine. It is unknown if the character, beyond appearance, is the same as or related to the previous role.

The episode is dedicated to the memory of Miguel Ferrer and Don S. Davis, who both appear in it, Ferrer in new material and Davis in archival footage.

=== Music ===
Almost every episode of the 2017 Twin Peaks series features a live performance by a band at the Roadhouse. In this episode the American country group The Cactus Blossoms performs their song "Mississippi". Additionally, the song "Dream Recall" by Lynch and Dean Hurley is featured; as of January 2018, the song has not been released on any official soundtrack.

== Reception ==
=== Broadcast ===
"Part 3" was originally released on the Showtime Anytime app together with "Part 4" on May 22, 2017; the episode was subsequently broadcast on the Showtime network on May 28, 2017, and was watched by 195,000 viewers in the United States, the lowest number of viewers for the season.

=== Critical reception ===
"Part 3" received critical acclaim. On Rotten Tomatoes, the episode received a 100% rating based on 21 reviews. The critics' consensus reads, "'Part 3' Shifts Twin Peaks signature strangeness into an intoxicating new gear while narrowing the season's off-kilter narrative focus." Writing for IndieWire, Liz Shannon Miller praised the way Part 3 "really challenges the show's link to what we consider normality—the first half hour especially proves to be intense." She called the earlier sequences of the episodes "exhilarating" "[f]or those who want nothing more than to delve into the mysteries of the Black Lodge and whatever happened to Agent Cooper," while also writing that they "provide little respite for fans in search of solid ground." She praised the episode as proof that "the descent into madness is real."

The New York Times' Noel Murray called the episode "a dose of David Lynch madness so concentrated and so puzzling that it might've been best just to let it bounce around in viewers' heads for a week"; he compared the episode's early scenes to Lynch's feature debut Eraserhead, "which also has images of a Godlike being yanking levers in a cosmic factory", and called them "wondrously confounding." Murray praised Part 3's "'normal'" moments, while calling the episode as a whole mostly "pure, magnificent abstraction." In his recap for Entertainment Weekly, Jeff Jensen gave Part 3 an A−, praising its first scene as a "mesmerizing passage of pure Lynchian invention," "a wonderful flexing of Lynch's intuitive art-making powers, and, in my view, a love letter to filmmaking and his fans." He wrote that the episode "continued to defy our expectations of Twin Peaks here at the start. But I'm liking it and I find meaning in the challenge."

The A.V. Club's Emily L. Stephens gave Part 3 an A, citing the scene in Hawk's office as an example of the way the series "employs the cute stuff, the cozy stuff, the comfortable stuff [...] as a counterpoint to its cruelest moments." She wrote that in the episode "women's bodies are even more ostentatiously objectified", noting that Jade, "one of the few black actors in Twin Peaks, is introduced nude" and serves a small purpose to the plot, and that "the silhouette of Agent Tamara Preston [...] frames the scene" in which Cole and Rosenfield are told that Cooper is back; she clarifies that "[t]his is not a complaint", and praises it "as a comment on objectification" rather than "a thoughtless reiteration of it." Finally, she praises "the imponderable experimentation of the opening, with Cooper descending into a dim room where an eyeless woman powers a clumsy vessel through a starry void."

== Trivia ==
- Albert's line "The absurd mystery of the strange forces of existence" was the subtitle of Lynch's unrealized film project Ronnie Rocket.
