= Episode 6 (Twin Peaks) =

- Twin Peaks episode
- Episode no.: Season 1 Episode 7
- Directed by: Caleb Deschanel
- Written by: Harley Peyton
- Original air date: May 17, 1990
- Running time: 47 minutes

Guest appearances
- Chris Mulkey as Hank Jennings; David Patrick Kelly as Jerry Horne; Walter Olkewicz as Jacques Renault; Kimmy Robertson as Lucy Moran; Wendy Robie as Nadine Hurley; Don Amendolia as Emory Battis; Victoria Catlin as Blackie O'Reilly; Mark Lowenthal as Herbert Neff

Episode chronology
← Previous "Episode 5"	Next → "Episode 7"

"Episode 6", also known as "Realization Time", (Note: Although the series originally did not have episode titles, when it was broadcast in Germany the episodes were given titles that are now used by some fans and critics.) is the seventh episode of the first season of the American surrealist mystery horror drama television series Twin Peaks. The episode was written by Harley Peyton, and directed by Caleb Deschanel. "Episode 6" features series regulars Kyle MacLachlan, Sherilyn Fenn and Eric Da Re, with guest appearances by Chris Mulkey and David Patrick Kelly.

Federal Bureau of Investigation (FBI) agent Dale Cooper (MacLachlan) and Twin Peaks sheriff Harry Truman (Ontkean) continue to investigate a murder in the small mountain town of Twin Peaks; while local businessman Benjamin Horne (Beymer) schemes to burn down the town's sawmill to further his property empire.

Deschanel has noted that the episode, like most in the series, was filmed from a relatively short teleplay; he feels that this has contributed to its ability to develop characterization and subtextual inferences in addition to advancing its narrative. Peyton has described writing dialogue for MacLachlan's character Dale Cooper as being particularly tricky, though he found Fenn's character Audrey Horne to be enjoyable to write for. First airing on May 17, 1990, "Episode 6" was viewed by approximately 17 percent of the available audience during its broadcast. The episode has received positive reviews from critics.

== Plot ==
=== Background ===
The small town of Twin Peaks, Washington, has been shocked by the murder of schoolgirl Laura Palmer (Sheryl Lee) and the attempted murder of her friend Ronette Pulaski (Phoebe Augustine). FBI special agent Dale Cooper (Kyle MacLachlan) has come to the town to investigate, and initial suspicion has fallen upon Palmer's boyfriend Bobby Briggs (Dana Ashbrook) and the man with whom she was cheating on Briggs, James Hurley (James Marshall). However, other inhabitants of the town have their own suspicions: the violent, drug-dealing truck driver Leo Johnson (Eric Da Re) is seen as a possible suspect; especially to his wife Shelly (Mädchen Amick), who has found a bloodstained shirt among his belongings. Meanwhile, Cooper finds the possible scene of the murder, at the home of drug smuggler Jacques Renault (Walter Olkewicz); Renault's myna bird is taken in as evidence.

=== Events ===
Cooper returns to his hotel room to find Audrey Horne (Sherilyn Fenn) waiting in his bed; he cautions her about being unable to get involved with her due to his position and goes to the hotel restaurant to get malts and fries for them both. The next morning he and Sheriff Truman (Michael Ontkean) plan to pay an undercover visit to One Eyed Jacks, a casino and brothel over the Canada–US border, to which Renault is connected. They bring along Ed Hurley (Everett McGill), with Cooper having requisitioned $10,000 from the FBI to pass as high-stakes gamblers.

Johnson, alive but injured, is spying on his own home, watching Briggs visit Shelly. Shelly is terrified that Johnson will return and kill her; but Briggs reassures her he will take care of things. Johnson is also listening to a police radio in his truck, and hears that Renault's myna bird is being considered a witness as its ability to mimic speech might provide a clue; he drives off immediately. That night, he shoots the bird dead through the sheriff station's window. However, a voice-activated tape recorder had been left by the bird's cage; Cooper is able to find the words "Leo, no!" among the phrases it had repeated that evening.

James Hurley, Donna Hayward (Lara Flynn Boyle) and Madeline Ferguson (Lee) listen to cassette tapes found in Laura's bedroom; they are all monologues addressed to psychiatrist Laurence Jacoby (Russ Tamblyn). One dated to the night of her death is missing; the group plan to use Ferguson's resemblance to Laura to distract Jacoby long enough to steal it from his office. Jacoby falls for the ruse long enough; however, Hurley and Hayward are watched from afar by Briggs, who is in turn being spied on by an unseen party. Briggs hides a bag of cocaine in the gas tank of Hurley's motorcycle.

Audrey, meanwhile, has begun working at her father's department store, in a position both Laura and Pulaski occupied before their abduction. Audrey spies on another coworker being showered with gifts and offered a job in "hospitality" by the store's manager, and later finds both Laura's and Pulaski's names in the manager's private ledger. Having found an address for One Eyed Jacks, Audrey visits and applies under a false name. The brothel's madam, Blackie O'Reilly (Victoria Catlin) is hesitant to hire her but is convinced when Audrey ties a cherry stem in a knot with her tongue.

Catherine Martell (Piper Laurie) learns that a new life insurance policy has been taken out in her name, by Josie Packard (Joan Chen) and Benjamin Horne (Richard Beymer). Martell had been planning with Horne to burn down Packard's sawmill in order to cheaply purchase the land it occupies. Packard speaks to Horne over the telephone, cooperating with the sawmill arson, but arranging to burn it down with Martell inside. As Packard hangs up, it is seen that the recently paroled killer Hank Jennings (Chris Mulkey) has been beside her.

== Production ==
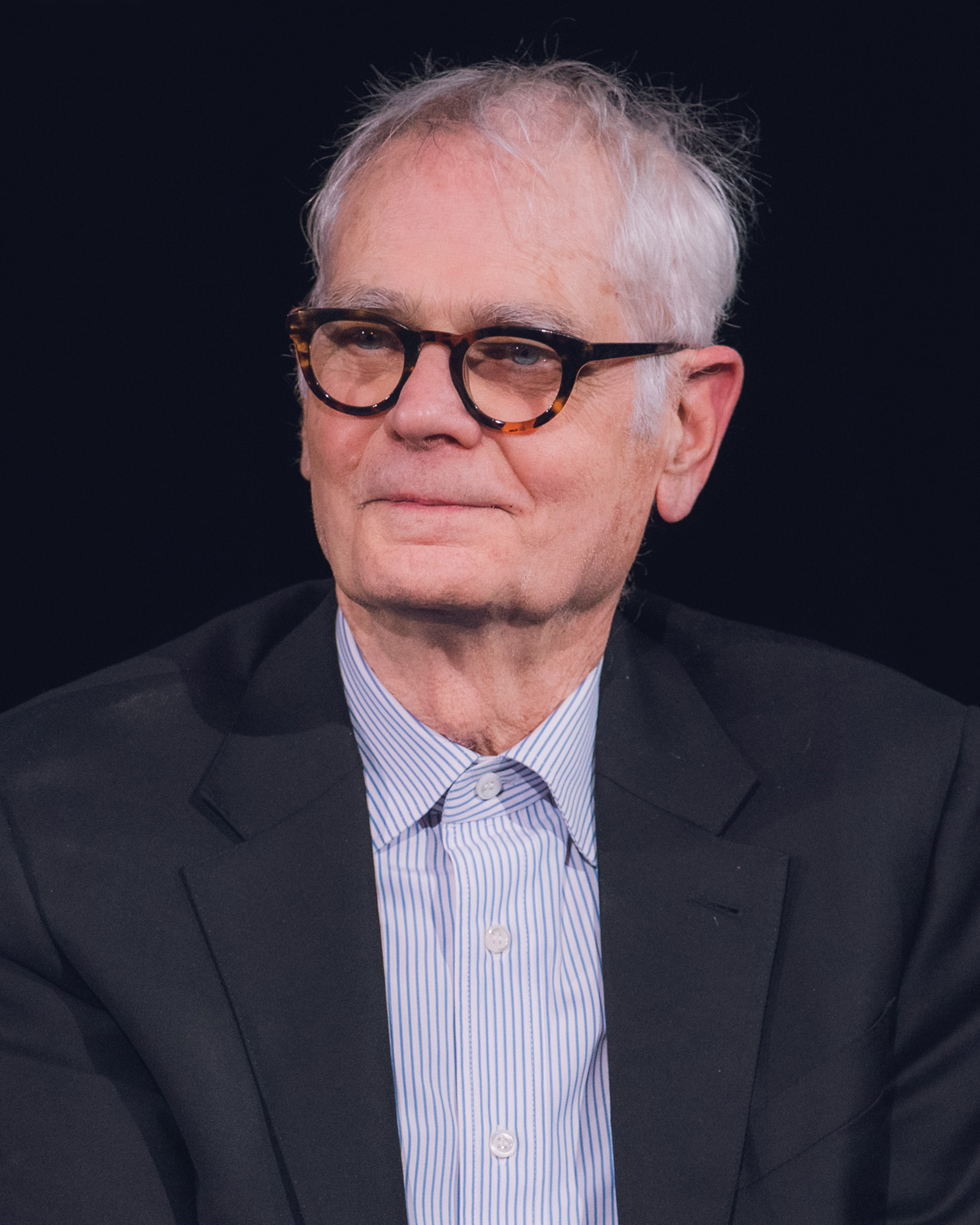
"Episode 6" was the first of three episodes directed by Caleb Deschanel (pictured 2026).

"Episode 6" was the second of the series to be written by Harley Peyton, who had previously scripted "Episode 3"; Peyton returned to pen a number of other episodes across both seasons. The episode was directed by noted cinematographer Caleb Deschanel, who later helmed two episodes in the second season.

Each episode of Twin Peaks was written sequentially; this allowed the overall plot to gather momentum as it progressed but allowed for the organic process of adding new elements as the writers thought of them; a process favored by series co-creator David Lynch. It also allowed Mark Frost, Lynch's partner in creating the series, to plan ahead to ensure plot details and threads would be revisited as necessary. Deschanel recalls the teleplay for the episode being approximately 40–45 pages long, which he felt offered the show a "leisurely" pace compared to modern television episode, which are filmed from teleplays of up to 120 pages. This allowed the series to dwell on its subtext and unexpressed desires of its characters, rather than focusing solely on narrative action. Deschanel and Peyton have described the episode as exemplifying the need to "be a fan" of the series to fully enjoy it, as the progression and development of the characters occurs over multiple episodes and rewards the attention of a regular viewer.

Peyton has noted that the distinct personalities of the series' characters meant that he considered some of them much more difficult to convincingly write for than others. He found Cooper to be particularly tricky to write for, as the character had an idiosyncratic view of the world which needed to be maintained; but found Audrey Horne to be his favourite to work on as he considered the character—and actress Sherilyn Fenn—to be both sexy and smart, and to have developed substantially as the series progressed. The character of Madeline Ferguson was named for characters in Alfred Hitchcock's 1958 film Vertigo—Kim Novak's Madeleine Elster and James Stewart's Scottie Ferguson. Ferguson's cousin, the murdered schoolgirl Laura Palmer, was similarly named after the titular character in Otto Preminger's 1944 film Laura; while other characters in the series would also be named for film noir characters.

The popular "cherry stem" scene was inspired by an incident in Peyton's life; he had been dining with friends during the time he was writing the script when a female friend demonstrated to the group that she could knot a cherry stem with her tongue. Peyton immediately added this to the script, finding it fascinating that he could witness something on one day, write it the next, and two weeks later see newspapers discussing his version of it. Fenn has admitted that she was unable to actually perform the trick, simply switching the stem for a tied one already hidden in her mouth; however, co-star Mädchen Amick has since demonstrated it during television interviews.

Scenes filmed in the One Eyed Jacks casino and brothel were shot on location at a house on the shore of California's Malibou Lake; footage for several episodes were shot on the same day by different directors so as to scatter the scenes throughout the episodes that required them. Deschanel has expressed regret over the use of a "house style" in the series' direction and cinematography, feeling that he lit certain scenes in this episode in a way he would not usually have done; preferring to have employed a chiaroscuro use of shadow as opposed to the reddish tints used throughout.

== Broadcast and reception ==
Maddie [is] oblivious to what her resemblance to Laura does to people but she's not above letting that resemblance be used in the search for Laura's killer. ... We're deep into Vertigo territory, only it seems like half the town could be cast in the Jimmy Stewart part.

— The A.V. Club's Keith Phipps on the episode's influences

"Episode 6" was first broadcast on the ABC Network on May 17, 1990. In its initial airing, it was viewed by 10.6 percent of US households, representing 17 percent of the available audience. This marked a slight decrease from the previous episode, which had attracted 11.5 percent of the population and 18 percent of the available audience. "Episode 6" was the fortieth most-viewed broadcast that week, tying with Family Matters, which aired on the same network.

Writing for The A.V. Club, Keith Phipps rated the episode an "A−", finding that the death of Waldo the myna bird acted as a summation of the tone of the series—noting that it "should be goofy but it's completely chilling". Phipps also compared the episode to Hitchcock's Vertigo, describing it as he could "imagine Brian DePalma watching and wishing he'd thought of first". AllRovi's Andrea LeVasseur awarded the episode four stars out of five. Daniel J. Blau of Television Without Pity found the scene featuring Waldo being shot to have been directed well; Blau felt the minimal and straightforward approach taken was in stark contrast to the over-the-top direction taken by newer crew members in the series' second season.

== Footnotes ==
=== References ===
- Deschanel, Caleb; Peyton, Harley (2001), Episode 6: Commentary (DVD), Twin Peaks: The Complete First Season: Artisan Entertainment
- Hunter, Tim; Engels, Robert (2001), Episode 4: Commentary (DVD), Twin Peaks: The Complete First Season: Artisan Entertainment
- Riches, Simon (2011). "Intuition and Investigation into Another Place: The Epistemological Role of Dreaming in Twin Peaks and Beyond". In Devlin, William J.; Biderman, Shai (eds.). The Philosophy of David Lynch. Lexington: University Press of Kentucky. ISBN 978-0-8131-3396-6.
