= Da Re =

Da Re (Italian pronunciation: [daˈrɛ]) is an Italian surname which translates to "like (in the manner of) a king". Notable people with the surname include:

- Aldo Ray (1926–1991), American actor born Aldo Da Re
- Eric Da Re (born 1965), American actor
- Giacomo Da Re, Italian rugby union player
- Gianantonio Da Re (born 1953), Italian politician
