= List of Twin Peaks episodes =

Twin Peaks: Definitive Gold Box Edition. This box set contains all 30 episodes from the first two seasons including special features on 10 DVDs.

Twin Peaks is an American surrealist mystery horror drama television series created by David Lynch and Mark Frost whose pilot was first released in September 1989; the series spans 48 episodes over three seasons. The show's original run, which comprises two seasons and 30 episodes, premiered on April 8, 1990, on ABC in the United States and ended on June 10, 1991. ABC canceled the original run due to declining ratings in the second season. The show's third season, consisting of 18 episodes, was announced in October 2014 and premiered on Showtime on May 21, 2017. The pilot and season 2 premiere are each 94 minutes long, while every other episode is approximately 45 minutes. Most episodes of the third season are approximately 60 minutes.

Twin Peaks follows FBI Special Agent Dale Cooper (Kyle MacLachlan), who is sent to the fictional town of Twin Peaks, Washington, to investigate the murder of popular and respected high school student Laura Palmer (Sheryl Lee). A feature-length prequel film, Twin Peaks: Fire Walk with Me, was released on August 28, 1992, and depicts the events leading up to Laura's death.

Both original seasons of Twin Peaks were released on DVD in the U.S., the first season in 2001 by Republic Pictures Entertainment/Artisan Home Entertainment and the second season in 2007 by Paramount Pictures Home Entertainment/CBS DVD. A DVD box set, The Definitive Gold Box Edition, was released on October 30, 2007, and included additional features. The original series and the feature-length film were released together on Blu-ray with even more material on July 29, 2014.

== Series overview ==
| Season | Episodes | Originally released | | |
| Season | Episodes | First released | Last released | Network |
|---|---|---|---|---|
| 1 | 8 | April 8, 1990 | May 23, 1990 | ABC |
| 2 | 22 | September 30, 1990 | June 10, 1991 | ABC |
| Fire Walk with Me | | August 28, 1992 | | N/A |
| 3 | 18 | May 21, 2017 | September 3, 2017 | Showtime |

== Episodes ==
=== Season 1 (1990) ===
The first season originally aired on ABC in the United States between April 8 and May 23, 1990, consisting of eight episodes.

The feature-length pilot, originally released in September 1989, opens with the discovery of the plastic-wrapped body of high school student Laura Palmer, an event that profoundly impacts the residents of the small town of Twin Peaks, Washington. With the help of local sheriff Harry S. Truman, FBI agent Dale Cooper investigates the murder, meeting the town's quirky residents and uncovering disturbing secrets.

| No. overall | No. in season | Title | Directed by | Written by | Original release date | U.S. viewers (millions) |
|---|---|---|---|---|---|---|
| 1 | 1 | "Pilot" (Note: An extended version of the pilot with an extended and closed ending was originally released as a made-for-television film on VHS in Europe. David Lynch reworked parts of this ending into Episode 2, which became the famous dream sequence.) (Note: Double-length episode (approximately 94 minutes).) "Northwest Passage" | David Lynch | Mark Frost & David Lynch | April 8, 1990 (Note: Before its television premiere, this episode screened at the Telluride Film Festival in September 1989.) | 34.6 |
In February 1989 in Twin Peaks, Washington, the corpse of homecoming queen Laura Palmer is discovered. Soon after, Laura's classmate Ronette Pulaski is found beaten and in a fugue state, prompting idiosyncratic FBI Agent Dale Cooper to travel to Twin Peaks to assist Sheriff Harry S. Truman in the investigation. Finding a piece of paper under Laura's fingernail bearing the letter "R", Cooper suspects a killer responsible for a similar murder one year earlier may have struck again. Discerning from Laura's diary and her friend Donna Hayward that she was having an affair and was a cocaine addict, Cooper suspects more sinister goings-on. Deputies Andy Brennan and Tommy "Hawk" Hill discover the crime scene: an abandoned railway car containing half a locket and "Fire walk with me" written in blood. Donna realizes that James Hurley, Laura's secret lover, has the other half of the locket and persuades him to bury it. Following an altercation at the Roadhouse, a local bar, Truman arrests James, Laura's boyfriend Bobby Briggs, and Bobby’s friend Mike Nelson. Laura's mother, Sarah Palmer, has a nightmare depicting an unseen figure unearthing the locket.
| 2 | 2 | "Episode 1" "Traces to Nowhere" | Duwayne Dunham | Mark Frost & David Lynch | April 12, 1990 | 23.2 |
Staying at the Great Northern Hotel, Cooper meets Audrey Horne, the unruly teenage daughter of the hotel's owner, prominent businessman Benjamin Horne. Cooper and Truman interrogate James, who reveals he knew Laura was a cocaine addict, but that she had been recovering until a relapse in the previous week. In their jail cell, Bobby and Mike discuss money they owe to violent trucker Leo Johnson. After James, Bobby, and Mike are released from custody, James asks his uncle, mechanic Ed Hurley, to seek protection from the "Bookhouse Boys". Shelly Johnson, Bobby's secret lover and Leo's wife, is horrified to discover a shirt belonging to Leo covered in blood. Donna reveals to her mother, Eileen Hayward, that she and James had fallen in love while James and Laura were seeing each other. Donna visits Sarah to offer condolences, but Sarah has a horrifying vision of a gray-haired man. Angered that her brother's widow Josie Packard has control of the family sawmill, Catherine Martell plots with Ben to burn the mill down. Laura's eccentric psychiatrist, Dr. Lawrence Jacoby, listens to secret cassette tapes she sent him, revealing he is the one who unearthed the locket.
| 3 | 3 | "Episode 2" "Zen, or the Skill to Catch a Killer" | David Lynch | Mark Frost & David Lynch | April 19, 1990 | 19.2 |
Ben's brother Jerry Horne arrives in Twin Peaks to visit One Eyed Jacks, a casino and brothel the Horne brothers own across the Canada–United States border. Bobby and Mike discover that Leo, their cocaine dealer, knows Shelly is having an affair. Cooper relates a dream he had years earlier about a Tibetan investigative technique: while reading the names of suspects, he throws a stone at a glass bottle; if the bottle breaks, the suspect is worth investigating. The technique suggests Leo and Jacoby are suspects. Acerbic FBI forensics specialist Albert Rosenfield arrives in Twin Peaks to perform Laura's autopsy. Josie, suspecting Catherine's ill intentions, discovers she has been keeping two sets of ledgers. To Sarah's distress, her husband Leland's grieving has become increasingly unhinged. Cooper has a surreal dream about a one-armed man named MIKE and a malevolent spirit named BOB who vows to "kill again". In the dream, an older Cooper sits in a red room with a dwarf and a woman who resembles Laura. They speak in a jarring, disjointed manner, and "Laura" whispers something in Cooper's ear. Cooper wakes up, calls Truman, and declares he knows who the killer is.
| 4 | 4 | "Episode 3" "Rest in Pain" | Tina Rathborne | Harley Peyton | April 26, 1990 | 16.7 |
To impress Cooper, on whom she has a crush, with her investigative skills, Audrey reveals One Eyed Jacks may hold a clue and that Laura and Ronette both worked at the perfume counter at Ben's department store. Truman and police secretary Lucy Moran meet Cooper for breakfast, where Cooper insists his dream holds the key to solving the murder, but admits he cannot remember what "Laura" told him. Albert raises the ire of Truman and Donna's father Dr. Will Hayward by refusing to allow Laura's body to be released for her funeral, leading Cooper to step in on their behalf. Laura's cousin Maddy Ferguson arrives in Twin Peaks for the funeral, finding Leland in an increasingly unstable state. Cooper questions Leo, who has an alibi for the night of Laura's murder. At the funeral, Bobby angrily blames the townspeople for not helping Laura when they all knew she was in trouble and threatens to kill James. Truman introduces Cooper to the Bookhouse Boys: a secret society investigating the passage of cocaine into Twin Peaks, who have identified Roadhouse bartender Jacques Renault as a supplier. Jacoby admits to Cooper that Laura was the only one of his patients he cared for.
| 5 | 5 | "Episode 4" "The One-Armed Man" | Tim Hunter | Robert Engels | May 3, 1990 | 17.4 |
Cooper realizes that Sarah's vision of the gray-haired man was BOB from his dream. Jacoby admits Laura's problems were of a sexual nature and that she mentioned a man who drives a red sports car, which Truman realizes belongs to Leo. Laura's corpse has extensive bird bites and a poker chip in her stomach bearing the letter "J", which Cooper connects to One Eyed Jacks. Hawk tracks down the one-armed man from Cooper's dream, a shoe salesman named Philip Michael Gerard who seems to know nothing about the dream spirits; however, he does have a friend named Bob, a veterinarian, which Cooper connects to Laura's bird bites. Josie discovers that Ben is plotting with Catherine. The veterinarian's office contains the same twine used to bind Laura's wrists. Shelly gives Leo's bloodstained shirt to Bobby, which he takes to Jacques's apartment to frame Leo for Laura's murder. Going through the veterinarian's files, Andy finds a bird that matches the description of Laura's bites belonging to Jacques. Ben meets with Leo, arranging to have the sawmill burned. James and Donna, having heard of Sarah's nightmare, discover Laura's locket has been stolen. Meanwhile, Josie receives a coded message from Hank Jennings, Norma's husband.
| 6 | 6 | "Episode 5" "Cooper's Dreams" | Lesli Linka Glatter | Mark Frost | May 10, 1990 | 17.3 |
The police search Jacques's apartment and find Leo's bloodstained shirt and a seedy magazine where Laura and Ronette advertised sexual services. Finding pictures of a red-curtained log cabin, Cooper recalls his dream and postulates that the cabin is connected to the murder. In counseling with Jacoby, Bobby breaks down and admits Laura was psychologically unstable and wanted to die. Maddy meets James and Donna and agrees to help investigate a hiding place Laura mentioned. Audrey spies on Ben and Catherine, discovering their plan, and later gains employment at the perfume counter where Laura and Ronette worked. Cooper and the police meet the eccentric Margaret "Log Lady" Lanterman, who claims her apparently sentient tree log saw two men with Laura and Ronette the night of the murder. Later, they find Jacques's cabin, discovering the bird and a broken poker chip. Ben meets with Josie; revealing they have been scheming behind Catherine's back. Hank Jennings, husband of Norma Jennings (the owner of the Double R Diner and Ed's secret lover), is paroled and threatens Leo, asserting his position as the leader of the drug trade. When Leo lashes out at Shelly, she draws the gun and shoots him. Cooper returns to his hotel room and finds Audrey naked in his bed.
| 7 | 7 | "Episode 6" "Realization Time" | Caleb Deschanel | Harley Peyton | May 17, 1990 | 15.6 |
Cooper comforts Audrey, convincing her they could never have a relationship. The bird, able to mimic human speech, says "Laura", "Don't go there", and "Leo, no!" before being secretly shot by Leo. Cooper and Ed go undercover at One Eyed Jacks, discovering Jacques is a dealer. Catherine discovers Josie has taken out life insurance in her name, revealing Josie has arranged with Ben to burn down the mill with Catherine inside, allowing Josie to profit and Ben to turn the land into a development project. Audrey eavesdrops on her boss offering a co-worker a hostess role at One Eyed Jacks. Using this information, she gains an interview with Jacks's madam Blackie O'Reilly and is hired after she ties a knot in a cherry stem with her tongue. Maddy, James, and Donna find tapes Laura recorded for Jacoby and speculate that Jacoby is the killer. They concoct a scheme: Maddy, who closely resembles Laura, will pretend to be her and lure Jacoby from his office, allowing James and Donna to search it for evidence. Out of revenge for his affair with Laura, Bobby plants cocaine on James's motorcycle. While James and Donna break into Jacoby's office, an unseen figure watches Maddy.
| 8 | 8 | "Episode 7" "The Last Evening" | Mark Frost | Mark Frost | May 23, 1990 | 18.7 |
James and Donna find another tape in Jacoby's office. Jacoby suffers a heart attack after being attacked by an unseen assailant while searching for "Laura". James, Donna, and Maddy listen to Laura's tape, discovering Laura was attracted to Leo despite knowing he was homicidal. At One Eyed Jacks, Cooper poses as a drug financier and hires Jacques for a job, allowing him to be arrested on American soil after he brags about having sex with Laura the night of the murder. Leland, having heard Jacques is a suspect, suffocates him. Ben signs the deal on the development project. Hank calls Catherine, who has discovered Josie stole the ledger, telling her the ledger is at the mill. Leo ambushes Shelly and ties her up at the mill, lighting the fire. Catherine arrives and frees Shelly, but it is unclear whether they escape. Bobby tips off the police and James is arrested for cocaine possession. Hank shoots Leo to cover up the evidence. Lucy, Andy's girlfriend, reveals she is pregnant. To Audrey's horror, her first client at One Eyed Jacks is her father. Cooper finds a secret letter from Audrey but is shot by an unseen assailant before he can read it.

=== Season 2 (1990–91) ===
The second season originally aired on ABC in the United States between September 30, 1990, and June 10, 1991, consisting of 22 episodes.

Before the season began, a companion book, The Secret Diary of Laura Palmer, was published, several entries from which were featured during the season. In February 1991, Bob Iger, president of ABC Entertainment, announced plans to put Twin Peaks on hiatus. In May, Iger said, "it's unlikely that Twin Peaks will return". The series was ultimately cancelled after its second season, leaving it on a cliffhanger ending.

The season continues Cooper's investigation of Laura's murder and explores the elusive "Black Lodge", which may hold the key to the events occurring in Twin Peaks. After receiving clues from a mysterious giant who appears to him in a dream and investigating a second murder, Cooper discovers the identity of Laura's killer. After the FBI suspends Cooper for participating in an unauthorized raid on One Eyed Jacks, his insane former partner, Windom Earle, arrives in Twin Peaks to confront him.

| No. overall | No. in season | Title | Directed by | Written by | Original release date | U.S. viewers (millions) |
|---|---|---|---|---|---|---|
| 9 | 1 | "Episode 8" "May the Giant Be with You" | David Lynch | Story by : Mark Frost & David Lynch; Teleplay by : Mark Frost | September 30, 1990 | 19.1 |
As Cooper lies bleeding from his wound, he has a vision of a mysterious giant who gives him several clues, notably that three people have seen Laura's killer, but none have seen his body. In the fire's aftermath, Shelly and Catherine's husband Pete Martell recover from smoke inhalation, while Catherine is missing and Josie has fled to avoid suspicion. Leo, having survived his shooting, recovers under police guard. Albert returns to Twin Peaks to investigate Cooper's shooting, but Cooper returns to work quickly and realizes that Leo could not have been the killer as he was in jail when the previous victim of the same killer was murdered. In the hospital, Jacoby recalls smelling scorched engine oil at the same time Jacques was killed. Overnight, Leland's hair has turned completely white, while Maddy is horrified when a nightmare she had of seeing the carpet covered in blood miraculously comes true. Realizing neither Leo nor Jacques could have been the killer, Cooper and the police theorize that a third man must have been involved. Audrey finds herself hopelessly out of her depth at One Eyed Jacks. Still comatose, Ronette has a horrifying vision of BOB killing Laura.
| 10 | 2 | "Episode 9" "Coma" | David Lynch | Harley Peyton | October 6, 1990 | 14.4 |
Albert reveals that Cooper's insane former partner, Windom Earle, has escaped from a mental hospital. Donna takes Laura's place as a Meals on Wheels volunteer to investigate potential suspects, leading to an eerie encounter with the bedridden Mrs. Tremond and her grandson, who Tremond claims is studying magic. Tremond complains about the presence of creamed corn on her plate, and when Donna looks away the creamed corn miraculously appears in Tremond's grandson's hands. Ronette awakens from her coma and with horror identifies BOB as her attacker. Andy discovers he is infertile and concludes Lucy must have had an affair. Leland recognizes a wanted poster for BOB as a man who lived near his grandfather's house when he was a child. With Leo in a vegetative state, Bobby schemes for Shelly to continue to care for Leo so that she can collect disability payments and she and Bobby can live together. Bobby's father, Major Garland Briggs, who works for the U.S. Air Force monitoring deep space probes, passes on a mysterious message for Cooper from the probes: "The owls are not what they seem". Maddy has a horrifying vision of BOB. Blackie discovers Audrey's deception and restrains her.
| 11 | 3 | "Episode 10" "The Man Behind the Glass" | Lesli Linka Glatter | Robert Engels | October 13, 1990 | 13.7 |
Cooper discovers a piece of paper bearing the letter "B" under Ronette’s fingernail, matching the "R" under Laura's fingernail and the "T" under Teresa Banks, the previous victim of the same killer. Donna meets Harold Smith, an agoraphobiac and one of Laura's Meals on Wheels deliverees. Leland reveals BOB's real name is Robertson, a man who lived near his childhood summer house who used to flick matches at him and ask "You want to play with fire, little boy?". Cooper realizes the letters are attempting to spell "Robertson". Blackie drugs Audrey into a comatose state. Jacques's older brother Jean Renault schemes to use her to lure Cooper to One Eyed Jacks to kill him and avenge Jacques. Shelly refuses to testify about Leo's involvement in the mill fire, leading Cooper to suspect her disability scheme. Gerard, selling Truman shoes, sees the poster of BOB and is overcome with lightheadedness. Realizing James and Maddy are falling for each other, Donna laments at Laura's grave that things are more complicated with her dead. In a trance state, Jacoby identifies Leland as Jacques's killer, leading Truman to arrest Leland. Donna discovers a secret diary of Laura's hidden at Harold’s house.
| 12 | 4 | "Episode 11" "Laura's Secret Diary" | Todd Holland | Jerry Stahl and Mark Frost & Harley Peyton & Robert Engels | October 20, 1990 | 12.8 |
Leland confesses to murdering Jacques. Rumor spreads that a food critic going by the pseudonym "M.T. Wentz" will be visiting Twin Peaks, much to the excitement of Hank, who is working at the Double R with Norma and believes that a positive review could bring new business to the diner. Jean blackmails Ben with a videotape of Audrey being held captive, demanding $125,000 for her return with Cooper as the drop-off man. Harold reads excerpts from Laura's diary to Donna, but refuses to give it to her, claiming it holds no evidence to her murder. Josie returns, having been shopping in Seattle, and Pete tells her that Catherine is presumed dead. Lucy reveals to Andy that she had an affair with Dick Tremayne, a pretentious men's fashion salesman, who could potentially be the father of her child and who has offered her money for an abortion. Although jealous over James's attraction to her, Donna enlists Maddy's help in retrieving Laura's diary. Josie introduces Pete to Jonathan, who she claims to be her cousin. Once Pete leaves, Jonathan tells Josie it is time for her to return to Hong Kong. Later, Jonathan roughs up and threatens Hank at the Double R.
| 13 | 5 | "Episode 12" "The Orchid's Curse" | Graeme Clifford | Barry Pullman | October 27, 1990 | 11.4 |
Cooper finds Audrey's note and realizes that she has gone to One Eyed Jacks. Hawk discovers that the house Leland claimed to be occupied by BOB is owned by two retired schoolteachers who have no knowledge of BOB. As Leland's court hearing begins, Judge Clinton Sternwood releases him on bail and deems Leo incompetent to stand trial. Sternwood advises Cooper to keep his eyes on the woods. Following a suicide attempt, Ed's unstable wife Nadine Hurley mentally reverts to a teenager, believing herself to be a high school student, and demonstrates unnatural strength which she seems unaware of. A Japanese businessman, Mr. Tojamura, offers Ben five million dollars for the Ghostwood Development Project (on the site of the sawmill). Ben tasks Cooper with delivering Audrey’s ransom money. Andy discovers that his sperm count has miraculously recovered, meaning that he could be the father of Lucy’s child, but realizes with horror that she has gone to an abortion clinic. Realizing that Jean plans to kill him, Cooper and Truman plan to raid One Eyed Jacks. They rescue Audrey and Blackie is killed, but Jean manages to escape. Maddy and Donna attempt to steal Laura’s diary but are caught by Harold.
| 14 | 6 | "Episode 13" "Demons" | Lesli Linka Glatter | Harley Peyton & Robert Engels | November 3, 1990 | 11.3 |
James rescues Maddy and Donna, who fail to take Laura's diary. Discerning that Audrey has received a near-lethal dose of heroin, Cooper and Truman identify Jean as a major Canadian drug trafficker. Cooper returns the ransom money to Ben, whose affection is rebuffed by Audrey. Shelly and Bobby discover that Leo's disability payment is substantially smaller than they expected. FBI Regional Bureau Chief Gordon Cole, Cooper's hard-of-hearing supervisor, arrives in Twin Peaks, revealing that a material found outside Cooper's room following his shooting was from a vicuña coat, that a drug taken by Gerard is a unique and unidentified substance, and that papers found near the crime scene were from a diary. Gordon warns Cooper not to get in over his head, referring to a previous incident in Pittsburgh, and delivers an anonymous message: an opening chess move, which Cooper believes is from Earle. Cooper and Truman interrogate Gerard, who has a seizure and is possessed by MIKE, who claims to be BOB’s former partner and recites a poem: Through the darkness of future past, the magician longs to see, one chants out between two worlds, fire walk with me. MIKE reveals that BOB is hiding at the Great Northern.
| 15 | 7 | "Episode 14" "Lonely Souls" | David Lynch | Mark Frost | November 10, 1990 | 17.2 |
Hawk investigates Harold after Donna reveals that he has Laura's diary, but discovers that he has hanged himself, leaving a note reading "J'ai une âme solitaire." (Note: French for "I have a lonely soul".) Maddy tells Leland and Sarah that she is returning home. Bobby discovers a hidden cassette tape in the heel of Leo’s boots. Audrey confronts Ben, revealing that she knows he owns One Eyed Jacks, and Ben admits that he slept with and loved Laura. The pages from the diary are reconstructed, revealing that Laura was molested and abused by BOB and that she planned to "tell the world about Ben Horne". After Audrey reveals her information about Ben, Cooper and Truman arrest him. The Log Lady tells Cooper there are owls at a bar called the Roadhouse. Going to the Roadhouse, Cooper has a vision of the giant saying "It is happening again." At the Palmer house, Leland, possessed by BOB, drugs Sarah and murders Maddy, placing a letter under her fingernail. At the Roadhouse, Donna, Bobby, James, and Cooper sense that something happened. The senile waiter tells Cooper "I'm so sorry..."
| 16 | 8 | "Episode 15" "Drive with a Dead Girl" | Caleb Deschanel | Scott Frost | November 17, 1990 | 13.3 |
James and Donna visit the Palmer house to say goodbye to Maddy, but a jovial Leland tells them she has already left. When he adjusts his tie in the mirror, the face of BOB stares back at him. Jerry, revealed to be a disreputable lawyer, prepares Ben’s defense. Ben insists he was with Catherine the night of Laura’s murder, which Jerry realizes is a poor alibi given that Catherine is presumed dead. Having crammed Maddy’s corpse into his golf bag, Leland drives around town in an eerily good mood. When Truman informs him that Ben has been arrested, Leland feigns shock, but secretly smiles darkly. Later, he is pulled over by Truman and Cooper for reckless driving and prepares to kill them with a golf club when they almost discover Maddy, but they are called away at the last minute. Bobby discovers that Leo’s hidden tape contains evidence of Ben’s involvement in the sawmill fire. Catherine, revealed to have survived and in disguise as Tojamura, delivers a cassette tape to Ben, blackmailing him by offering to confirm his alibi in exchange for Ghostwood. Leland stashes Maddy’s corpse in the woods, where it is later discovered by Truman and Cooper.
| 17 | 9 | "Episode 16" "Arbitrary Law" | Tim Hunter | Mark Frost & Harley Peyton & Robert Engels | December 1, 1990 | 12.4 |
Cooper asks Truman not to report Maddy’s death yet, believing he is on the verge of solving the case. Revealing that Mrs. Tremond’s grandson had said "J'ai une âme solitaire" to her, Donna decides to visit to Mrs. Tremond with Cooper and Andy. They find a woman claiming to be Mrs. Tremond, despite being decades younger and having no children. "Mrs. Tremond" gives Donna an envelope containing a page from Laura’s diary, revealing Laura shared Cooper’s red room dream. Leland is agitated when he sees Donna wearing Laura’s sunglasses and receives a call from Maddy’s mother who reports her missing. Leland poises to attack Donna, but is distracted by Truman, who reports there has been another murder. Donna realizes with despair that Maddy is dead and tells James, who leaves town on his motorcycle in exile. Following his instincts, Cooper brings Ben, Leland, Ed, and Major Briggs to the Roadhouse. The giant and the waiter appear, and Cooper recalls what Laura whispered in his dream: "My father killed me". Cooper and Truman arrest Leland, and BOB taunts them. BOB leaves Leland’s body, leaving Leland horrified by his actions. Cooper holds Leland as he dies. Truman speculates that BOB has escaped.
| 18 | 10 | "Episode 17" "Dispute Between Brothers" | Tina Rathborne | Tricia Brock | December 8, 1990 | 11.1 |
Cooper tells a distraught Sarah that Leland was a victim of dark forces and was not responsible for his crimes. Donna tells Ed that James blames himself for everything that has happened. Twin Peaks's mayor, Dwayne Milford, feuds with his brother, newspaper publisher Dougie Milford, over Dougie marrying a young woman, Lana Budding. With Nadine still believing herself to be a teenager, Jacoby persuades the high school administration to admit her as a student. Bobby plans to blackmail Ben using Leo’s tape to provide for him and Shelly. Catherine tells Truman that her life was saved after the fire by an angel. With the murder solved, Cooper prepares to leave Twin Peaks, but FBI agent Roger Hardy arrives and informs him that he has been suspended for his illegal raid on One Eyed Jacks, while an RCMP officer angrily reveals that cocaine is missing from Jacks, prompting the DEA to become involved. Ernie is hired by Jean to raise $125,000 by selling cocaine, while the RCMP officer plots to plant cocaine on Cooper’s car. On a camping trip with Cooper, Major Briggs begins talking about a mysterious "White Lodge", before a bright light flashes and Major Briggs vanishes.
| 19 | 11 | "Episode 18" "Masked Ball" | Duwayne Dunham | Barry Pullman | December 15, 1990 | 12.1 |
Gordon warns Cooper that the DEA is sending Denise Bryson, a friend of Cooper's, to investigate the missing cocaine. Cooper maintains his innocence, insisting he must "focus out beyond the edge of the board". Riding his motorcycle on the open road, James meets a woman named Evelyn Marsh at a bar. She hires him to fix her husband's car. Trying to impress Lucy, Dick and Andy mentor an orphan named Nicky Needleman. Hawk reveals that the White Lodge is a mythical place where spirits reside, and that those traveling there must first pass through its counterpart, the Black Lodge, where the souls of those with imperfect courage will be annihilated by their shadow selves. Denise arrives in Twin Peaks and starts her investigation. Josie reveals to Truman that she worked for a man in Hong Kong named Thomas Eckhardt who she believes to be responsible for her husband's death, and that Eckhardt wants her back. Cooper receives a letter from Earle, containing a chess move and cassette tape saying, "the king must die". Andrew Packard, Josie's husband, is revealed to be alive and scheming with Catherine to use Josie as bait for Eckhardt.
| 20 | 12 | "Episode 19" "The Black Widow" | Caleb Deschanel | Harley Peyton & Robert Engels | January 12, 1991 | 10.3 |
In an erratic mental state, Ben hires Bobby to tail Hank, who is working with Jean and Ernie. Cooper inquires about buying property in Twin Peaks; touring a bungalow named Dead Dog Farm, he discovers tire tracks and cocaine. Dougie dies of a heart attack. Dwayne accuses Lana, who has an intoxicating effect on the men around her, of murdering Dougie with sex. Nadine joins the high school wrestling team and easily defeats Mike, whom she has a crush on. Evelyn’s brother Malcolm reveals to James that Evelyn's husband beats her regularly and that she damages his car in retaliation. While changing a flat tire with Nicky, Dick narrowly avoids injury when the car falls off the jack. Major Briggs's superior, Colonel Reilly, informs Cooper that the major's disappearance is a matter of national security, and that the message he shared with Cooper originated from the woods near Twin Peaks. Threatening to give her up to Eckhardt, Catherine employs Josie as her maid. Cooper publishes his response to Earle's chess move in the newspaper, but Earle anticipates his response. Denise blackmails Ernie into helping her and Cooper create a sting for Jean. Major Briggs miraculously returns in his living room.
| 21 | 13 | "Episode 20" "Checkmate" | Todd Holland | Harley Peyton | January 19, 1991 | 9.8 |
Major Briggs, bearing three triangular scars below his right ear, recalls a vision of a giant owl. He becomes upset wondering if his experience was meant for his soul. He tries to explain to Cooper that the Air Force has been unofficially searching for the White Lodge, but they are interrupted by soldiers who escort the major away. An anxious Ernie calls Jean to arrange the sting operation at Dead Dog Farm. Dick becomes paranoid that Nicky may be a personification of Satan and enlists Andy's help in raiding the orphanage's files to investigate. Ben comes to believe that he is Robert E. Lee and reenacts the Battle of Gettysburg, changing history so that the Confederacy won. James finishes fixing Evelyn's husband's car and they have sex. Truman deputizes Cooper as they leave for the sting. Jean foils the sting and holds Cooper hostage. Denise distracts Jean, allowing Cooper to shoot him. A power outage hits Twin Peaks. Leo awakens from his coma, startling a terrified Shelly. Cooper, Truman, and Hawk discover that the power outage was caused by a fire at the power station, and that Earle has planted a corpse in Truman's office, with one hand pointed at a chess board.
| 22 | 14 | "Episode 21" "Double Play" | Uli Edel | Scott Frost | February 2, 1991 | 8.7 |
Cooper accurately predicts the corpse's wounds. Leo corners Shelly with an axe. Bobby arrives at the last minute, distracting Leo long enough for Shelly to stab him in the leg. Wounded, Leo wanders away into the night. Lucy and Dr. Hayward scorn Dick and Andy’s efforts to prove Nicky's malice, revealing Nicky is the victim of a lifetime of tragedies. Cooper reveals that years ago he and Earle were assigned to protect Earle's wife Caroline Powell after she witnessed a federal crime. Cooper admits to having loved Caroline and that she died after he was wounded by an unseen assailant. Cooper believes that Earle committed the crime Caroline witnessed and that he murdered her. In a delirious state, Major Briggs confesses that he believes he was taken to the White Lodge during his disappearance. Thomas Eckhardt arrives in Twin Peaks. Jonathan is found murdered in Seattle, leading Cooper and Truman to suspect Josie. Evelyn reveals her husband has died in a car accident, leading James to realize that she and Malcolm (revealed to be her lover) have framed him to kill her husband. Leo stumbles through the woods into a log cabin, where a man introduces himself as Windom Earle.
| 23 | 15 | "Episode 22" "Slaves and Masters" | Diane Keaton | Harley Peyton & Robert Engels | February 9, 1991 | 8.2 |
Evelyn frames James for her husband's death. Hiding from the police, James meets with Donna, who tries to help him prove his innocence. Albert returns, warning that Earle sent fragments of Caroline's clothing to various locations across the country. Earle imprisons Leo, placing a shock collar around his neck, and forces him to transcribe a poem. Josie refuses to discuss Jonathan's murder. Cooper secretly takes a fiber sample from her coat, which Albert identifies as the vicuña found outside Cooper's room after he was shot. Cooper and Truman suspect that every time Earle takes a piece in the chess game, he kills a person in real life. They enlist Pete – an expert chess player – in helping to stalemate the game to prevent further loss of life. Audrey, Jerry, Bobby, and Jacoby take part in Ben's fantasy, revising history so that Ulysses S. Grant surrenders instead of Lee, triggering Ben's return to reality. Donning a disguise, Earle delivers torn fragments of the poem to Shelly, Audrey, and Donna. Malcolm tries to kill James but Evelyn, confessing that she genuinely loves James, fatally shoots Malcolm. Earle plants Caroline's death mask and a cassette tape in Cooper's bed.
| 24 | 16 | "Episode 23" "The Condemned Woman" | Lesli Linka Glatter | Tricia Brock | February 16, 1991 | 7.8 |
Earle's message for Cooper taunts him to make his move in the deadly chess game. Albert presents ballistic evidence that confirms Josie shot Cooper and murdered Jonathan, which Truman overhears. Ben enlists the help of his business associate John Justice Wheeler to foil Catherine's plans for the Ghostwood development, and together with Audrey and Jerry they formulate a plan to stage a protest over the disruption posed to the natural habitat of the pine weasel by the development. Catherine coerces Josie to meet with Eckhardt, which Josie realizes will lead to her imminent return to Hong Kong. Andrew reveals himself to Eckhardt, warning him that Josie is dangerous. The torn fragments of Earle's poem delivered to Shelly, Audrey, and Donna contain an invitation to meet at the Roadhouse; the three of them go there and realize that someone has arranged their meeting. Disguised, Earle watches, but doesn't introduce himself to them. Cooper and Truman ambush Josie at the Great Northern; she fatally shoots Eckhardt before dying of an unexplained cause. A vision of BOB taunts Cooper, followed by the dwarf from Cooper's dream dancing. Josie's face appears trapped in the wooden knob on a drawer.
| 25 | 17 | "Episode 24" "Wounds and Scars" | James Foley | Barry Pullman | March 28, 1991 | 9.2 |
Truman mourns Josie, leaving Cooper and Hawk to take over sheriff duties. Norma’s half-sister Annie Blackburn arrives in Twin Peaks after having run away from a convent. The Log Lady is transfixed by Major Briggs’s scars, telling Cooper that as a girl she disappeared for several days and returned with similar scars on her leg. Earle realizes with fury that Cooper is attempting to stalemate the game. Eckhardt’s assistant, Jones, delivers a puzzle box from Eckhardt to Catherine. Disguised, Earle visits Donna and leaves a gift for her father, pretending to be a colleague from medical school. Later, Dr. Hayward is disturbed by this encounter, as the colleague Earle imitated drowned several years earlier and the gift is a chess piece intended for Cooper. Audrey and Dick organize a fashion show to promote the Stop Ghostwood campaign, where Catherine tells Ben that an environmental impact assessment has already proven that the pine weasel is not threatened by the development, and that she knows he’s acting out of self-interest rather than genuine empathy. A live pine weasel runs amok, ruining the event. While Truman rests, Jones breaks in, incapacitates the officer looking after him, and joins him in bed.
| 26 | 18 | "Episode 25" "On the Wings of Love" | Duwayne Dunham | Harley Peyton & Robert Engels | April 4, 1991 | 9.2 |
Jones attempts to strangle Truman, but he manages to subdue her. Cooper speculates that Eckhardt wanted Truman dead out of sexual jealousy over his affair with Josie. Audrey flirts with Wheeler, who offers to take her flying in his private jet. A bonsai tree is delivered to Truman's office, supposedly sent by Josie prior to her death. Unbeknownst to Cooper and Truman, the bonsai was sent by Earle who planted a listening device in it. Gordon returns, reinstating Cooper as a federal agent, and reveals that Earle has a history with Major Briggs and that they share a special interest in the Black and White Lodges. Earle reveals to Leo that he intends to kill the winner of the upcoming Miss Twin Peaks beauty pageant. Donna discreetly follows Eileen to a secret meeting with Ben. Gordon meets Shelly, who he can inexplicably hear perfectly. Annie recognizes Major Briggs and the Log Lady's scars as a petroglyph from Owl Cave. Donna receives a postcard from James, who has gone to Mexico to clear his head but promises to return. Cooper discovers the petroglyph but is unable to make sense of it. Later, Earle visits it and the cave wall rumbles violently.
| 27 | 19 | "Episode 26" "Variations on Relations" | Jonathan Sanger | Mark Frost & Harley Peyton | April 11, 1991 | 7.9 |
Cooper and Truman realize that Earle visited Owl Cave. Earle kidnaps Rusty Tomasky, a traveling musician, and tells him about the Black Lodge and his desire to harness its power. Catherine requests Pete's help in opening the puzzle box. Lana, who is now in a relationship with Dwayne, convinces him to rig the Miss Twin Peaks contest – of which he is one of the judges – so that she will win. Cooper matches the handwriting in the poem sent by Earle and Leo's arrest report, realizing that Leo wrote the poem. Earle traps Rusty inside a papier-mâché chess pawn before killing him with a crossbow. Pete accidentally drops the puzzle box, opening it and revealing a smaller puzzle box inside. Cooper and Annie eventually bond over their troubled pasts – Cooper failing to protect Caroline, and Annie attempting suicide prior to going to the convent. Gordon flirts with and kisses Shelly, much to Bobby's chagrin. Dick hosts a wine tasting to promote the Stop Ghostwood campaign, where his pretentious behavior irritates Lucy. Donna presses Eileen over her meeting with Ben, which Eileen insists was charity-related. Cooper and Truman discover Rusty's corpse inside the pawn in a park.
| 28 | 20 | "Episode 27" "The Path to the Black Lodge" | Stephen Gyllenhaal | Harley Peyton & Robert Engels | April 18, 1991 | 7.4 |
Cooper realizes Earle's chess game is leading to a violent conclusion. Wheeler reveals he must leave immediately for Brazil. Donna finds her birth certificate, which has no father listed. Major Briggs reveals that Earle is obsessed with "dugpas", beings of pure evil. Cooper speculates that Earle's true motivation in coming to Twin Peaks is to find the Black Lodge. Several people around Twin Peaks are struck by sudden hand tremors. Shelly and Bobby reconcile their love. Audrey insists Pete drive her to the airport to catch Wheeler before he leaves. Earle tranquilizes Briggs. Audrey and Wheeler make love in his jet, bringing a tear to Pete's eye before he too is struck by hand tremors. Earle interrogates Briggs about the Black Lodge, discovering it will open when "Jupiter and Saturn meet". Andrew smashes the third puzzle box with a rolling pin, revealing a smaller metallic cube inside. Cooper and Annie dance at the Roadhouse, before a vision of the giant waves his arms at Cooper and mouths "no". Earle and Andy realize that the petroglyph is a map to the Black Lodge. In the woods, BOB emerges from a bright light, the drapes of the red room reflected beneath him.
| 29 | 21 | "Episode 28" (Note: The final two episodes of season two were aired together as one in the original broadcast.) "Miss Twin Peaks" | Tim Hunter | Barry Pullman | June 10, 1991 | 10.4 |
Leo frees Major Briggs, begging him to save Shelly. Audrey discovers that Ghostwood is being discreetly funded by the Twin Peaks Savings and Loan. Cooper speculates that BOB was drawn to Josie's fear and that fear is the key to the Black Lodge. Earle abandons Leo with a cage of tarantulas rigged on a pulley above his head. Donna demands that her parents tell her the truth about Eileen and Ben, but they refuse. Cooper recognizes two symbols on the petroglyph as Jupiter and Saturn, leading him to speculate that the Black Lodge will open with Jupiter and Saturn's impending alignment. After Major Briggs returns to society under the influence of haloperidol, his incoherent babbling that "fear and love open the doors" and mentions of a queen lead Cooper to conclude that Earle will take the winner of the Miss Twin Peaks contest to the Black Lodge. At the contest that night, Donna confronts Ben, who admits to having an affair with Eileen and potentially being Donna's father. Annie wins the contest. Disguised as the Log Lady, Earle shuts off the lights and sets off smoke bombs. When the lights turn back on, Earle and Annie are missing.
| 30 | 22 | "Episode 29" "Beyond Life and Death" | David Lynch | Mark Frost & Harley Peyton & Robert Engels (Note: Director David Lynch performed uncredited rewrites, keeping the original script's basic structure but altering much of the dialogue, adding appearances by many of the series' supporting characters, and changing the tone and atmosphere of many scenes, particularly the scenes taking place in the red room (which were altered to more closely resemble the dream sequence in Episode 2, also directed by Lynch).) | June 10, 1991 | 10.4 |
Earle takes Annie to a wooded grove, where they vanish behind the curtains of the red room. Having suffered head trauma during the pandemonium at the contest, Nadine reverts to her true age, upsetting Mike, who has come to genuinely love her. Ben tries to make things right with the Hayward family, but Dr. Hayward attacks him. Andrew and Pete discover that the metallic cube contains a safety deposit key. Audrey chains herself to a bank vault to protest Ghostwood, while Andrew and Pete arrive at the bank to unlock the safety deposit box, which detonates a bomb Eckhardt planted, killing them both. Cooper follows Earle and Annie into the red room. In a distorted voice, Sarah tells Major Briggs: "I'm in the Black Lodge with Dale Cooper. I'm waiting for you." Cooper sits in the red room with the dwarf and Laura, who says, "I'll see you again in 25 years". Cooper sees various apparitions, including one of Earle, who demands Cooper's soul in exchange for Annie's life. (Note: The other apparitions are of the senile waiter, the Giant, Annie, Caroline, Laura, and BOB.) BOB takes Earle's soul instead, and Cooper is chased and caught by his doppelgänger. Hours later, Cooper and Annie emerge in the grove. Cooper is taken back to the Great Northern, where he smashes his head against a mirror, his reflection that of BOB, and mockingly repeats "How's Annie?"

=== Twin Peaks: Fire Walk with Me (1992) ===
Twin Peaks: Fire Walk with Me is a prequel to the TV series. It recounts the investigation into the murder of Teresa Banks and the last seven days of Laura Palmer's life. Director David Lynch and most of the television cast returned for the film, with the notable exceptions of Lara Flynn Boyle, who declined to return as Donna Hayward and was replaced by Moira Kelly, and Sherilyn Fenn, due to scheduling conflicts. Kyle MacLachlan returned reluctantly as he wanted to avoid typecasting, so his presence in the film is smaller than originally planned. Lynch shot about five hours of footage, which was cut to 134 minutes to allow the film a mainstream release. Many of the cut scenes were later released as Twin Peaks: The Missing Pieces in 2014. The film was a box office bomb and widely panned by critics, but has developed a cult following over time and been critically reevaluated. The release of the third season in 2017, which made many references to the film, led to renewed interest.

| Title | Directed by | Written by | Release date (U.S.) |
|---|---|---|---|
| Twin Peaks: Fire Walk with Me | David Lynch | David Lynch & Robert Engels | August 28, 1992 |
In 1988, FBI agent Chester Desmond is sent to Deer Meadow, Washington, to investigate the murder of drifter and teenage prostitute Teresa Banks. FBI Regional Bureau Chief Gordon Cole has classified the case as a "Blue Rose" case—implying that it is of paranormal nature. While searching the trailer park where Teresa lived, Desmond finds her missing ring and is abducted by an unseen force. After Cole and agent Dale Cooper experience a vision of Phillip Jeffries, an agent who has been missing for several years, Cooper is sent to Deer Meadow to find Desmond to no avail. One year later in Twin Peaks, high school homecoming queen Laura Palmer is haunted by dreams about the Black Lodge. Laura, who has been sexually assaulted by BOB for several years, is horrified to find that the pages describing her assault have been torn out her diary. She discovers that BOB is a malevolent spirit who is possessing her father, Leland Palmer. After an encounter with MIKE, Leland recalls repressed memories of him killing Teresa. Psychologically unhinged, Laura goes to a cabin in the woods for an orgy with Ronette, Jacques and Leo. Leland follows her there and, after attacking Jacques and scaring Leo away, takes Laura and Ronette to an abandoned train car. Leland reveals to Laura that BOB wants to possess her. MIKE throws Teresa's ring from the Black Lodge and Laura puts it on, preventing BOB from possessing her. Enraged, Leland bludgeons Laura to death. The next morning, the Twin Peaks Sheriff’s Department finds her body, and as Cooper comforts her spirit in the Black Lodge, she sees an angel that had disappeared from her bedroom painting.

=== Season 3 (2017) ===
The third season is a limited series set 25 years after the events of the season two finale. All episodes were written by David Lynch and Mark Frost. The series was originally planned to have nine episodes, but after negotiations between Lynch and Showtime, the episode order was doubled, with Lynch confirmed to direct all episodes. The season premiered on May 21, 2017, and consists of 18 episodes identified only by number, with short quotes from each serving as both de facto titles and short synopses; no additional episode information was released in advance.

| No. overall | No. in season | Title | Directed by | Written by | Original release date | U.S. viewers (millions) |
|---|---|---|---|---|---|---|
| 31 | 1 | "Part 1" "My Log Has a Message for You" | David Lynch | Mark Frost & David Lynch | May 21, 2017 | 0.506 |
| 32 | 2 | "Part 2" "The Stars Turn and a Time Presents Itself" | David Lynch | Mark Frost & David Lynch | May 21, 2017 | 0.506 |
| 33 | 3 | "Part 3" "Call for Help" | David Lynch | Mark Frost & David Lynch | May 28, 2017 (Note: Parts 3 and 4 were made available immediately after the premiere of parts 1 and 2 through Showtime's digital platform.) | 0.195 |
| 34 | 4 | "Part 4" "... Brings Back Some Memories" | David Lynch | Mark Frost & David Lynch | May 28, 2017 | 0.195 |
| 35 | 5 | "Part 5" "Case Files" | David Lynch | Mark Frost & David Lynch | June 4, 2017 | 0.254 |
| 36 | 6 | "Part 6" "Don't Die" | David Lynch | Mark Frost & David Lynch | June 11, 2017 | 0.270 |
| 37 | 7 | "Part 7" "There's a Body All Right" | David Lynch | Mark Frost & David Lynch | June 18, 2017 | 0.294 |
| 38 | 8 | "Part 8" "Gotta Light?" | David Lynch | Mark Frost & David Lynch | June 25, 2017 | 0.246 |
| 39 | 9 | "Part 9" "This Is the Chair" | David Lynch | Mark Frost & David Lynch | July 9, 2017 | 0.355 |
| 40 | 10 | "Part 10" "Laura Is the One" | David Lynch | Mark Frost & David Lynch | July 16, 2017 | 0.267 |
| 41 | 11 | "Part 11" "There's Fire Where You Are Going" | David Lynch | Mark Frost & David Lynch | July 23, 2017 | 0.219 |
| 42 | 12 | "Part 12" "Let's Rock" | David Lynch | Mark Frost & David Lynch | July 30, 2017 | 0.240 |
| 43 | 13 | "Part 13" "What Story is That, Charlie?" | David Lynch | Mark Frost & David Lynch | August 6, 2017 | 0.280 |
| 44 | 14 | "Part 14" "We Are Like the Dreamer" | David Lynch | Mark Frost & David Lynch | August 13, 2017 | 0.253 |
| 45 | 15 | "Part 15" "There's Some Fear in Letting Go" | David Lynch | Mark Frost & David Lynch | August 20, 2017 | 0.329 |
| 46 | 16 | "Part 16" "No Knock, No Doorbell" | David Lynch | Mark Frost & David Lynch | August 27, 2017 | 0.267 |
| 47 | 17 | "Part 17" "The Past Dictates the Future" | David Lynch | Mark Frost & David Lynch | September 3, 2017 | 0.254 |
| 48 | 18 | "Part 18" "What Is Your Name?" | David Lynch | Mark Frost & David Lynch | September 3, 2017 | 0.240 |

== Episode titles ==
For the original series, creators David Lynch and Mark Frost assigned no episode titles, only numbers. When the series aired in Germany, titles were assigned, which were then translated to English. The episodes are untitled on the DVD sets, but the titles appear on CBS's Twin Peaks web page and on the Paramount+ streaming service. Episode 3, known as "Zen, or the Skill to Catch a Killer", is also known as "Zen and the Art of Killer-Catching". When episodes 29 and 30 aired in Germany, they were a single broadcast, with only episode 30 given a title. Fans then decided to title episode 29 "Miss Twin Peaks", which is how the episode is titled both on the CBS website and on Paramount+. When episode 29 was rerun in 1996, it was assigned a different title, "The Night of the Decision".

== Sources ==
- "Twin Peaks (1999–1991)". TV Guide.
- "Twin Peaks (2017)". TV Guide.
