= Episode 4 (Twin Peaks) =

- Twin Peaks episode
- Episode no.: Season 1 Episode 5
- Directed by: Tim Hunter
- Written by: Robert Engels
- Production code: 1.004
- Original air date: May 3, 1990
- Running time: 47 minutes

Guest appearances
- Grace Zabriskie as Sarah Palmer; Chris Mulkey as Hank Jennings; Jed Mills as Wilson Mooney; Al Strobel as Philip Michael Gerard / "The One-Armed Man"; David Lynch as Bureau Chief Gordon Cole (voice)

Episode chronology
← Previous "Episode 3"	Next → "Episode 5"

"Episode 4", also known as "The One-Armed Man", (Note: Although the series originally did not have episode titles, when it was broadcast in Germany the episodes were given titles that are now used by some fans and critics.) is the fifth episode of the first season of the American surrealist mystery horror drama television series Twin Peaks. The episode was written by Robert Engels and directed by Tim Hunter. "Episode 4" features series regulars Kyle MacLachlan, Piper Laurie and Richard Beymer, and introduces series co-creator David Lynch in the role of Gordon Cole.

Hunter's directing of the episode was inspired by Otto Preminger's 1945 film Fallen Angel, making use of small sets and long depth of field shots. Engels has identified several 1960s television series—The Wild Wild West, Mayberry R.F.D. and The Fugitive—as being influential to the series as a whole.

First airing on May 3, 1990, "Episode 4" was viewed by approximately 19 percent of the available audience during its broadcast, marking an increase in viewers from the previous week. "Episode 4" has received positive reviews from critics.

== Plot ==
=== Background ===
The small town of Twin Peaks, Washington, has been shocked by the murder of schoolgirl Laura Palmer (Sheryl Lee) and the attempted murder of her friend Ronette Pulaski (Phoebe Augustine). Federal Bureau of Investigation special agent Dale Cooper (Kyle MacLachlan) has come to the town to investigate, and initial suspicion has fallen upon Palmer's boyfriend Bobby Briggs (Dana Ashbrook) and the man with whom she was cheating on Briggs, James Hurley (James Marshall). However, other inhabitants of the town have their own suspicions, including the violent, drug-dealing truck driver Leo Johnson (Eric Da Re). Cooper experiences a surreal dream in which a dwarf and a woman resembling Laura reveal the identity of the killer. Laura's cousin Madeline Ferguson (Lee) arrives in town, while Cooper is introduced to the Bookhouse Boys, the town's secret society.

=== Events ===
Sarah Palmer (Grace Zabriskie) describes her vision of Killer Bob (Frank Silva) to Deputy Andy Brennan (Harry Goaz), while he sketches the man's face. She also describes a vision of someone taking Laura's heart necklace; Donna Hayward (Lara Flynn Boyle) winces at this, as she is the one who hid it.

Cooper interviews Laurence Jacoby (Russ Tamblyn), a psychiatrist who had been seeing Laura. Jacoby does not wish to breach his confidentiality agreement, but admits that he struggled to understand Laura's problems. He also casts suspicion on a man driving a red Corvette—Leo Johnson (Eric Da Re).

Gordon Cole (David Lynch) calls Cooper at the sheriff's station, offering insight into Laura's autopsy. Brennan brings in his sketch, which Cooper identifies as the man from his dream. He also receives a call from Deputy Hawk (Michael Horse), who has located the one-armed man they believe is somehow involved; the group find him at a motel. The man, Philip Michael Gerard (Al Strobel) is a traveling salesman, who denies any involvement or that he knows BOB.

At the same motel, local businessman Benjamin Horne (Richard Beymer) meets with Catherine Martell (Piper Laurie); the two are having an affair and planning to burn down the town's sawmill. The mill is owned by Josie Packard (Joan Chen), the widow of Martell's brother; Packard is spying on the couple in their motel room. Later, Horne meets with Leo Johnson (Eric Da Re), a violent truck driver, to arrange having the mill destroyed.

Norma Jennings (Peggy Lipton) travels to a parole hearing for her husband, Hank (Chris Mulkey). She is uneasy about helping his case as she is seeing Ed Hurley (Everett McGill), but promises him a job at the diner she owns. Meanwhile, Johnson's wife Shelley is having an affair with Briggs; she shows him Johnson's bloodstained shirt. He takes it, promising to rid them of Johnson for good.

Cooper, Truman and Brennan visit a veterinarian connected to Gerard; they find twine there of the type used to bind Laura. They believe that the bird that clawed her body is one of the animals being treated there, and confiscate the practice's files in order to locate the owners of birds being treated there. They learn that the scratches have been caused by a myna, and that drug smuggler Jacques Renault (Walter Olkewicz) owns one. They raid Renault's home, interrupting Briggs, who is planting Johnson's bloodied shirt. He flees, undetected; however, the shirt is recovered as evidence.

At the RR Diner, Hurley meets Madeline Ferguson (Lee), Laura's identical cousin; the two seem instantly smitten. Norma finds out that Hank has been released from prison; that evening Packard receives a brief phone call from him that leaves her shaken.

== Production ==
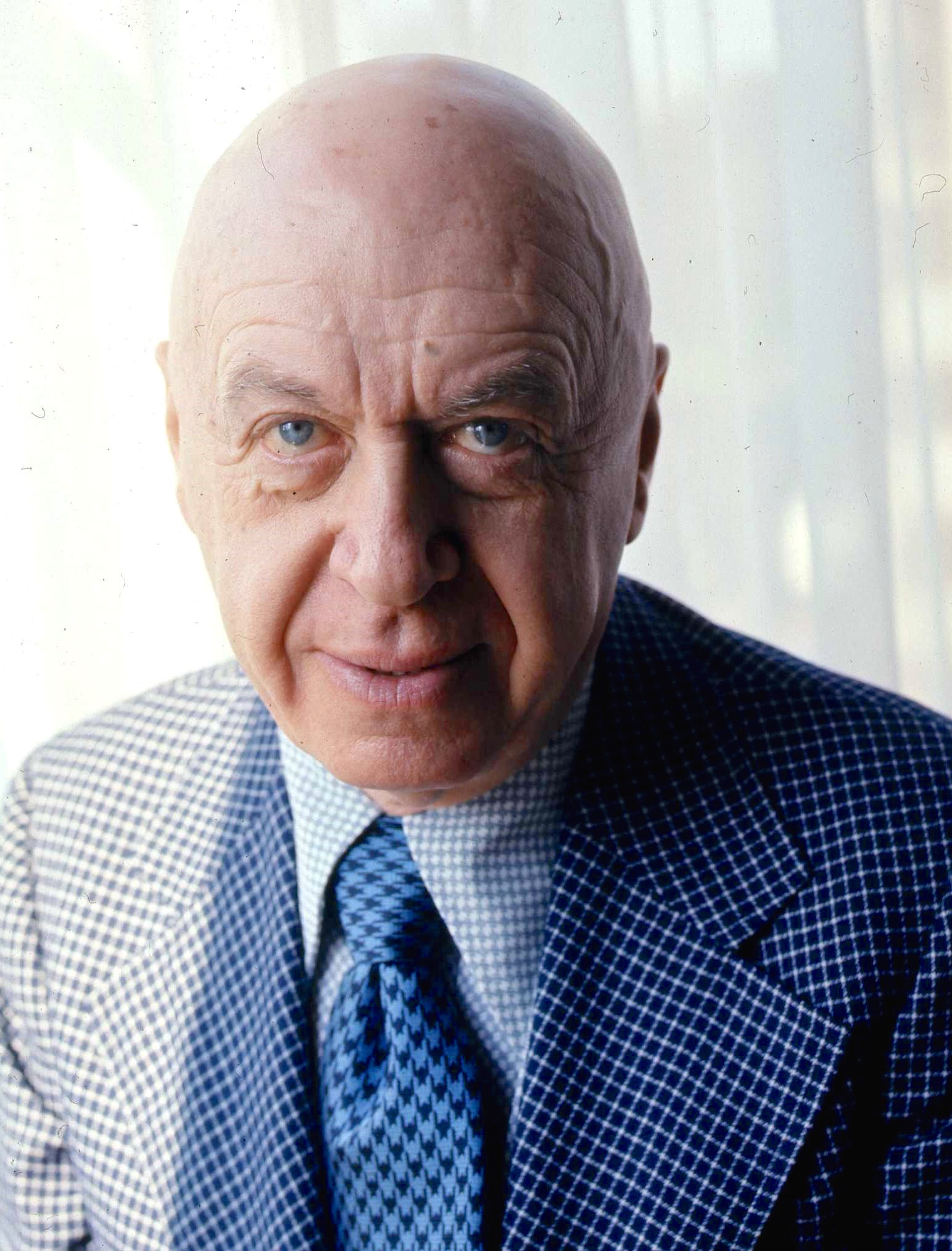
Hunter's direction of "Episode 4" was influenced by the techniques of Otto Preminger (pictured in 1976).

"Episode 4" was the first of the series to be written by Robert Engels; Engels returned to pen a number of other episodes across both seasons. The episode was directed by Tim Hunter, who would also go on to helm "Episode 16" and "Episode 28" in the second season. Hunter had known series co-creator David Lynch from their time studying together at the American Film Institute. Engels had been brought on board by the other creative force in the series, Mark Frost, who felt that Engels' sense of humor would be well-suited to the series' style. Engels found the pace of the series' writing to be quite fast, noting that Frost and Lynch would outline the plot of an episode in a matter of hours—Engels had previously been used to spending days at a time working on similar amounts of material with writing crews on other programs.

Hunter recalls being pleasantly surprised to learn that Russ Tamblyn and Richard Beymer had been cast as regular characters in the series, having enjoyed the early work of both actors during the 1950s and 1960s. Tamblyn improvised elements of his performance, including a magic trick involving two golf balls, which was something he had learned and wished to include during his role in the episode. The character of Gordon Cole, first played by Lynch in this episode as a voice in a telephone call, was conceived as being hard of hearing; this was because Lynch liked the idea of delivering his lines in a loud voice, and worked backwards to establish a reason for this. Engels wrote most of Cole's dialogue over the series, having had experience with his own mother being similarly hard of hearing.

Engels felt that the three largest influences on the series as a whole were the 1960s television series The Wild Wild West, Mayberry R.F.D. and The Fugitive—the inclusion of a one-armed character in Twin Peaks was a direct homage to the latter of these. Engels has also noted that the series would make use of normal, conventional storylines and everyday occurrences as a "familiar" framework, allowing subtle details to seem slightly more unusual against this backdrop—he particularly cites this episode's parole hearing for Hank Jennings as an example, as it offers nothing out of the ordinary other than the single domino which Jennings is playing with at all times, drawing attention to the item as it is the only thing which seems out of place.

Hunter's direction in some scenes was inspired by Otto Preminger's work on the 1945 film noir Fallen Angel. That film featured several scenes shot in tight spaces with a very small mise en scène; Hunter found himself using several of Preminger's techniques to make the most out of several of the episode's smaller sets such as the RR Diner. Several scenes in the episode were also shot using a split diopter lens, allowing for a greater depth of field. For example, a scene featuring Sherilyn Fenn and Richard Beymer talking had the actors at either side of a room; the split diopter lens allowed for both of them to still be in sharp focus. The episode ends with a shot featuring a Dutch angle; Hunter was the only director on the series whom Frost and Lynch allowed to use this shot, which was otherwise forbidden.

== Broadcast and reception ==
Here's an uncorrupted Laura ... to remind everyone of what they've lost and, in some cases, the girl they spoiled. I feel bad for the character ... because she's dropped into a small town where some kind of grand struggle between good and evil it playing out and she doesn't know it yet. She's an innocent. And while Lynch idealizes innocence it also tends not to last too long in any world he creates.

— The A.V. Club's Keith Phipps on Madeline Ferguson

"Episode 4" was first broadcast on the ABC Network on May 3, 1990. In its initial airing, it was viewed by 11.9 percent of US households, representing 19 percent of the available audience. This marked a slight increase from the previous episode, which had attracted 11.3 percent of the population and 18 percent of the available audience. "Episode 4" was the forty-fourth most watched broadcast on American television that week.

The A.V. Club's Keith Phipps rated the episode a B, deeming it "a 'normal' episode for the series". Phipps praised Al Strobel's performance, and felt that the episode served to highlight "Cooper's investigation-by-coincidence technique", while describing the character of Madeline Ferguson as "an embodiment of this series' obsession with duality". Writing for Allrovi, Andrea LeVasseur rated the episode four stars out of five. Television Without Pity's Daniel J. Blau offered mixed reactions to the episode's acting; he found Sheryl Lee, James Marshall and Grace Zabriskie to have been poor, but praised Kyle MacLachlan, Ray Wise and Dana Ashbrook for their performances.

== Footnotes ==
=== Bibliography ===
- Hunter, Tim; Engels, Robert (2001), Episode 4: Commentary (DVD), Twin Peaks: The Complete First Season: Artisan Entertainment
- Riches, Simon (2011). "Intuition and Investigation into Another Place: The Epistemological Role of Dreaming in Twin Peaks and Beyond". In Devlin, William J.; Biderman, Shai (eds.). The Philosophy of David Lynch. Lexington: University Press of Kentucky. ISBN 978-0-8131-3396-6.
