= Episode 7 (Twin Peaks) =

- Twin Peaks episode
- Episode no.: Season 1 Episode 8
- Directed by: Mark Frost
- Written by: Mark Frost
- Original air date: May 23, 1990
- Running time: 47 minutes

Guest appearances
- Chris Mulkey as Hank Jennings; Walter Olkewicz as Jacques Renault; Victoria Catlin as Blackie O'Reilly; Wendy Robie as Nadine Hurley; Kimmy Robertson as Lucy Moran

Episode chronology
← Previous "Episode 6"	Next → "Episode 8"

"Episode 7", also known as "The Last Evening", (Note: Although the series originally did not have episode titles, when it was broadcast in Germany the episodes were given titles that are now used by some fans and critics.) is the eighth and final episode of the first season of the American surrealist mystery horror drama television series Twin Peaks. Series co-creator Mark Frost wrote and directed the episode. It features series regulars Kyle MacLachlan, Piper Laurie and Eric Da Re, with guest appearances by Chris Mulkey and Walter Olkewicz.

Federal Bureau of Investigation (FBI) agent Dale Cooper (MacLachlan) pays the price for his investigation of a murder in the small mountain town of Twin Peaks, while the local sawmill is burnt in an arson scheme.

Like much of the series, "Episode 7" features unusual set and costume design, including the hallmark use of a strong red palette. Production designer Richard Hoover has explained that the sound stages were constructed with ceilings and functional hallways—an unusual practice for television production—allowing actors to be filmed entering a scene without cuts. First airing on May 23, 1990, "Episode 7" was viewed by about 22 percent of the available audience; it received positive reviews from critics.

== Plot ==
=== Background ===
The small town of Twin Peaks, Washington, has been shocked by the murder of schoolgirl Laura Palmer (Sheryl Lee) and the attempted murder of her friend Ronette Pulaski (Phoebe Augustine). FBI special agent Dale Cooper (Kyle MacLachlan) has come to the town to investigate; the violent, drug-dealing truck driver Leo Johnson (Eric Da Re) is the chief suspect. Meanwhile, local businessman Benjamin Horne (Richard Beymer) has been scheming with his lover, Catherine Martell (Piper Laurie), to burn down the town's sawmill to buy its land cheaply. However, Horne also conspires with the mill's owner, Josie Packard (Joan Chen), to burn the mill and kill Martell to collect their insurance policies.

=== Events ===
James Hurley (James Marshall) and Donna Hayward (Lara Flynn Boyle) sneak into the office of psychiatrist Laurence Jacoby (Russ Tamblyn), hoping to find out more about Laura, whom he had been treating. They find a cassette tape she sent him. Meanwhile, Jacoby is distracted by an offer to meet Laura's cousin, Madeline Ferguson (Lee), who has disguised herself as the dead girl; before they can meet, however, he is attacked by a masked man and left unconscious.

Cooper and Ed Hurley (Everett McGill) are undercover in One Eyed Jacks, a Canadian brothel and casino. Cooper speaks to drug smuggler Jacques Renault (Walter Olkewicz), who he believes is connected to Laura's death. Posing as a drug financier, Cooper persuades Renault to meet him in the US; Cooper learns that Renault and Johnson were with Pulaski and Laura on the night she died. Later that night, when Renault arrives to meet Cooper, he is arrested for Laura's murder. Renault resists and is shot; he is taken to a hospital where he accuses Johnson of attacking him the night of the murder, claiming to have been unconscious while the killing occurred. Laura's father, Leland (Ray Wise), learns of the arrest; he travels to the hospital and fatally smothers Renault.

Johnson's wife, Shelly (Mädchen Amick), is at home when he returns and assaults her. He drives her to the sawmill, ties her up, and rigs a timed device that will set the building on fire. Meanwhile, Packard meets with recently paroled Hank Jennings (Chris Mulkey) to give him US$90,000; it is revealed Packard paid Jennings to serve eighteen months in prison. This ensured that neither of them would be implicated in the death of Packard's husband, from whom she inherited the mill. Hank later calls Catherine to lure her to the mill. As she arrives, the device explodes, engulfing the building in flames. At the same time, Leo attempts to kill Shelley's lover, Bobby Briggs (Dana Ashbrook), but is shot by Jennings.

Cooper returns to his hotel room and orders room service. Before he can read a note that was left earlier by Audrey, Deputy Brennan calls him to inform him that Johnson has been shot. However, a knock on the door draws him away from the phone. When he opens the door, an unseen figure shoots him three times.

== Production ==
Twin Peaks used a heavy red-based palette in its set and costume design; while the red hues of the footage were enhanced in post-production.

"Episode 7" was written and directed by Mark Frost, who created Twin Peaks along with David Lynch. Frost had previously penned "Pilot", "Episode 1" and "Episode 2" with Lynch; "Episode 5" was his first solo writing credit. Frost would pen a further six episodes during the second season. This was Frost's first and only time directing an episode of the series.

Production designer Richard Hoover notes that he saw "Pilot" at the Telluride Film Festival before becoming involved with the series; during that screening, he noticed Mark Frost's name in the credits and remembered working with his father Warren Frost. After learning that the production designer for "Pilot" was no longer available to work, Hoover contacted the younger Frost and enquired about working on the series; Hoover was hired almost immediately. Hoover has pointed out the unusual nature of the series' set designs; most of the sets feature ceilings and hallways that lead into them—this allows characters to be filmed entering a sound stage set without the use of cuts.

Hoover felt that the series' use of a consistent palette of reds and earth tones allowed the introduction of strong black elements into set and costume design; he cited elements of Blackie O'Reilly's office in One Eyed Jacks as an example: its vibrant red curtains and ruddy wood tones were offset by her stark black outfit and dark hair. The hues in the footage filmed for the series were "sweetened" in post-production, increasing the saturation of the red tones; this also caused black elements to seem deeper and more striking. This effect was offset by the clothing of several of the law enforcement characters, which had cooler tones and contrasted against the warm palette.

The power plant used for exterior shots in Jacques Renault's arrest scene was in Burbank, California. The location was chosen because of its large and unusually-shaped buildings; these were lit from behind to enhance their shapes in silhouette. The Hayward house was designed to seem uncharacteristically "normal"; it featured an increased amount of yellows and greys to offset the red tones, and it made use of several household rooms to enhance its appearance of verisimilitude. The location used for the scenes of the Packard sawmill was in Valencia, Santa Clarita; this was chosen because it was far from the tree line and thus there was no risk of a forest fire occurring after the arson scenes. In addition, any wood used was treated to burn in a controlled manner, and firefighters were on-hand in case of an emergency.

== Broadcast and reception ==
In my mind ... Frost seemed the partner most responsible for the series' story architecture while Lynch brought the atmosphere and mythology. Again, that's just my theory, but the fact that this episode chugs along like a well-oiled machine certainly supports it.

— The A.V. Club's Keith Phipps on the show's creative partnership

"Episode 7" was first broadcast on the ABC Network on May 23, 1990. In its initial airing, it was viewed by 12.6 percent of US households, representing 22 percent of the available audience; it was the most-viewed broadcast in its time-slot. These ratings marked an increase from the previous episode, which had attracted 10.6 percent of the population and 17 percent of the available audience.

Writing for The A.V. Club, Keith Phipps rated the episode an "A", finding that the multiple cliffhanger plot threads worked well and did not seem over the top or self-parodying. Phipps felt that the first season was "a near-perfect run of television", further describing it as "a stretch of greatness that, for one reason or another, couldn't be sustained. But it was terrific while it lasted". AllRovi's Andrea LeVasseur awarded the episode four stars out of five, adding that "with several characters meeting their fate in this episode, including the two main suspects (Jacques and Leo), the mystery of Laura Palmer's murder is even more puzzling". Writing for Entertainment Weekly, Ken Tucker rated the episode an A+, finding that its lack of plot resolution offered "a good kind of annoyance", showing the level of interest and commitment the series had inspired in its viewers.

== Footnotes ==
=== References ===
- Hoover, Richard (2001), Episode 7: Commentary (DVD), Twin Peaks: The Complete First Season: Artisan Entertainment
- Riches, Simon (2011). "Intuition and Investigation into Another Place: The Epistemological Role of Dreaming in Twin Peaks and Beyond". In Devlin, William J.; Biderman, Shai (eds.). The Philosophy of David Lynch. Lexington: University Press of Kentucky. ISBN 978-0-8131-3396-6.
