= Gold Coast (novel) =

1980 novel by Elmore Leonard

- First edition (publ. Bantam Books)
- Author: Elmore Leonard
- Language: English
- Publisher: Bantam Books
- Publication date: 1980

Gold Coast is a 1980 crime fiction novel by American author Elmore Leonard. It was published as a mass-market paperback original. The book was adapted by Harley Peyton as a 1997 television film, Elmore Leonard's Gold Coast, directed by Peter Weller, and starring David Caruso and Marg Helgenberger.
