= Caleb Deschanel =

American cinematographer and film director (born 1944)

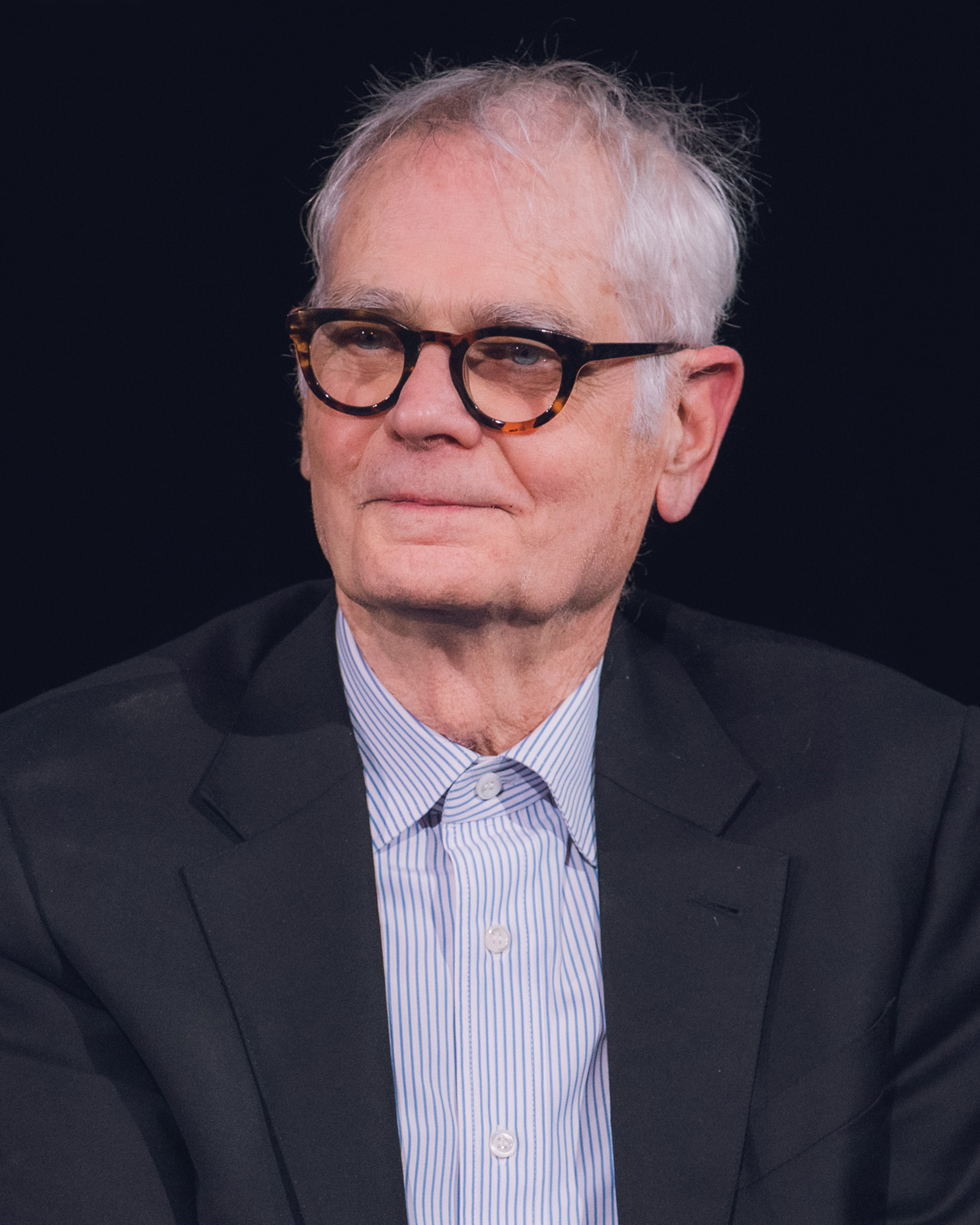
- Caleb Deschanel in 2026
- Born: Joseph Caleb Deschanel; September 21, 1944 (age 82); Philadelphia, Pennsylvania, U.S.
- Education: Johns Hopkins University; USC School of Cinematic Arts; AFI Conservatory
- Occupations: Cinematographer, film director
- Years active: 1969–present
- Spouse: Mary Jo Weir (m. 1972)
- Children: Emily Deschanel; Zooey Deschanel
- Awards: See below

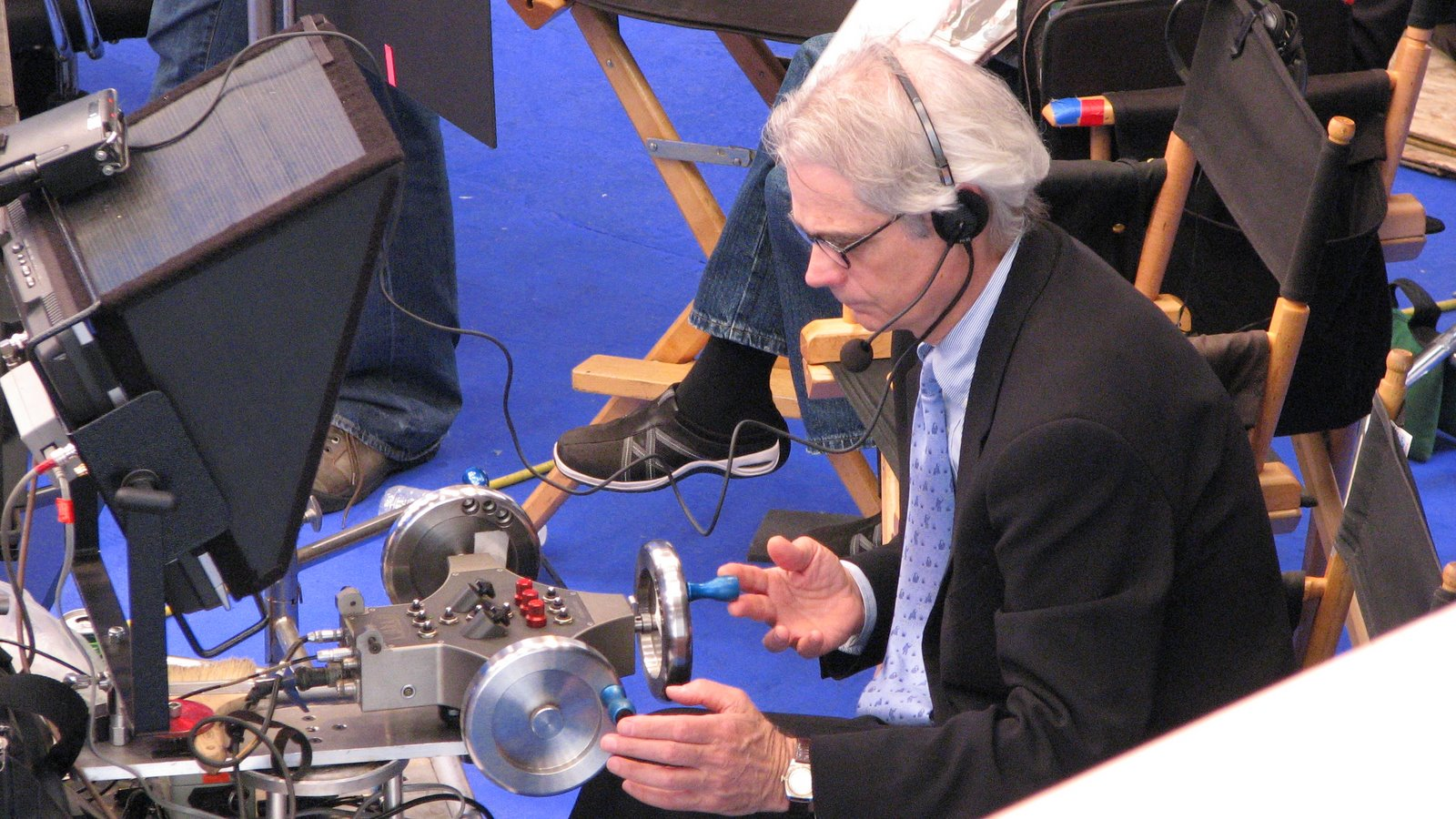
Deschanel on the set of The Spiderwick Chronicles, April 2007

Joseph Caleb Deschanel (born September 21, 1944) is an American cinematographer and director of film and television. He has been nominated for the Academy Award for Best Cinematography six times. He is also a member of the National Film Preservation Board of the Library of Congress, representing the American Society of Cinematographers.

He has been married to actress Mary Jo Deschanel since 1972, with whom he has two daughters, actresses Emily and Zooey Deschanel.

== Early life and professional education ==
Deschanel was born in Philadelphia, Pennsylvania, the son of Ann Ward (née Orr) and Paul Jules Deschanel. His father was French, from Oullins, Rhône, and his mother was American. Deschanel was raised in his mother's Quaker religion.

He enrolled in Severn School for his high school. He attended Johns Hopkins University from 1962 to 1966, where he met Walter Murch, with whom he staged "happenings," including one in which Murch sat down and ate an apple for an audience. Murch graduated a year ahead of him and encouraged Deschanel to follow him to the University of Southern California School of Cinematic Arts, where he graduated in 1968. During this time, Deschanel was a member of a band of film students called "The Dirty Dozen;" this group attracted attention from the Hollywood system. Following his graduation, he attended the American Film Institute (AFI) Conservatory and graduated in 1969 as a member of its first class.

== Personal life ==
Deschanel graduated from the AFI Conservatory in 1969. In 1972, he married actress Mary Jo Weir. They have two daughters, actresses Emily and Zooey. In 1984, he was invited to join the American Society of Cinematographers (A.S.C.).

== Filmography ==
=== As director ===
Film

- The Escape Artist (1982)
- Crusoe (1988)

Music video

- Rhythm of My Heart (1991) for Rod Stewart

Television

Year	Title	Episode(s)
1990-91	Twin Peaks	"Realization Time"
1990-91	Twin Peaks	"Drive with a Dead Girl"
1990-91	Twin Peaks	"The Black Widow"
2005	Law & Order: Trial by Jury	"41 Shots"
2005	Law & Order: Trial by Jury	"Bang & Blame"
2005	Law & Order: Trial by Jury	"Day"
2006	Conviction	"Savasana"
2006	Conviction	"Madness"
2007	Bones	"The Glowing Bones in the Old Stone House"

=== As cinematographer ===
Year	Title	Director	Notes
1979	Being There	Hal Ashby	
1979	More American Graffiti	Bill L. Norton	
1979	The Black Stallion	Carroll Ballard	
1982	Let's Spend the Night Together	Hal Ashby	
1983	The Right Stuff	Philip Kaufman	
1984	The Natural	Barry Levinson	
1985	The Slugger's Wife	Hal Ashby	
1994	It Could Happen to You	Andrew Bergman	
1996	Fly Away Home	Carroll Ballard	
1998	Hope Floats	Forest Whitaker	
1999	Anna and the King	Andy Tennant	
1999	Message in a Bottle	Luis Mandoki	
2000	The Patriot	Roland Emmerich	
2003	The Hunted	William Friedkin	
2003	Timeline	Richard Donner	
2004	National Treasure	Jon Turteltaub	
2004	The Passion of the Christ	Mel Gibson	
2006	Ask the Dust	Robert Towne	
2008	Killshot	John Madden	
2008	The Spiderwick Chronicles	Mark Waters	
2009	My Sister's Keeper	Nick Cassavetes	
2011	Dream House	Jim Sheridan	
2011	Killer Joe	William Friedkin	
2012	Abraham Lincoln: Vampire Hunter	Timur Bekmambetov	
2012	Jack Reacher	Christopher McQuarrie	
2014	Winter's Tale	Akiva Goldsman	
2016	Rules Don't Apply	Warren Beatty	
2017	Unforgettable	Denise Di Novi	
2018	Never Look Away	Florian Henckel von Donnersmarck	
2019	The Lion King	Jon Favreau	
2026	Wildwood	Travis Knight	

=== Other credits ===
Year	Title	Director	Cinematographer(s)	Contribution	Notes
1971	Angels Hard as They Come	Joe Viola	Stephen M. Katz	Additional photography	
1971	THX 1138	George Lucas	David Myers; Albert Kihn	Additional photography	Uncredited
1972	The Godfather	Francis Ford Coppola	Gordon Willis	Director of photography: Newspaper sequence	
1974	A Woman Under the Influence	John Cassavetes	Mitch Breit; Al Ruban	Additional photography	
1979	Apocalypse Now	Francis Ford Coppola	Vittorio Storaro	Director of photography: Inserts	
1983	The Black Stallion Returns	Robert Dalva	Carlo Di Palma	Additional photography	
1997	Titanic	James Cameron	Russell Carpenter	Director of photography: Halifax contemporary sequences	
2013	Gangster Squad	Ruben Fleischer	Dion Beebe	Additional photography	
2019	Ad Astra	James Gray	Hoyte van Hoytema	Additional photography	

== Awards and nominations ==
Institution	Year	Category	Work	Result
Academy Awards	1983	Best Cinematography	The Right Stuff	Nominated
Academy Awards	1984	Best Cinematography	The Natural	Nominated
Academy Awards	1996	Best Cinematography	Fly Away Home	Nominated
Academy Awards	2000	Best Cinematography	The Patriot	Nominated
Academy Awards	2004	Best Cinematography	The Passion of the Christ	Nominated
Academy Awards	2018	Best Cinematography	Never Look Away	Nominated
American Society of Cinematographers	1996	Outstanding Achievement in Cinematography	Fly Away Home	Nominated
American Society of Cinematographers	2000	Outstanding Achievement in Cinematography	The Patriot	Won
American Society of Cinematographers	2004	Outstanding Achievement in Cinematography	The Passion of the Christ	Nominated
Berlin International Film Festival	1976	Best Short Film	Trains	Won
British Academy Film Awards	1979	Best Cinematography	The Black Stallion	Nominated
British Society of Cinematographers	1980	Best Cinematography in a Theatrical Feature Film	The Black Stallion	Nominated
Camerimage Festival	2014	Lifetime Achievement Award	—N/a	Won
Camerimage Festival	2019	Golden Frog	Never Look Away	Nominated
Hawaiʻi International Film Festival	2001	Excellence in Cinematography Award	—N/a	Won
Hollywood Film Awards	2004	Cinematographer of the Year	The Passion of the Christ	Won
Los Angeles Film Critics Association	1979	Best Cinematography	The Black Stallion	Won
National Board of Review	2004	Career Achievement Award	—N/a	Won
National Society of Film Critics	1979	Best Cinematography	Being There	Won
National Society of Film Critics	1979	Best Cinematography	The Black Stallion	Won
Satellite Awards	1999	Best Cinematography	Anna and the King	Nominated
Visual Effects Society	2020	Outstanding Virtual Cinematography in a CG Project	The Lion King	Won
