= Episode 3 (Twin Peaks) =

- Twin Peaks episode
- Episode no.: Season 1 Episode 4
- Directed by: Tina Rathborne
- Written by: Harley Peyton
- Original air date: April 26, 1990
- Running time: 47 minutes

Guest appearances
- Grace Zabriskie as Sarah Palmer; Miguel Ferrer as Special Agent Albert Rosenfield; Walter Olkewicz as Jacques Renault; Royce D. Applegate as Reverend Clarence Brocklehurst; Jed Mills as Wilson Mooney; Wendy Robie as Nadine Hurley; Kimmy Robertson as Lucy Moran; Gary Hershberger as Mike Nelson; Don Davis as Major Garland Briggs; Charlotte Stewart as Betty Briggs; Robert Bauer as Johnny Horne; Catherine E. Coulson as Margaret Lanterman / "The Log Lady"

Episode chronology
← Previous "Episode 2"	Next → "Episode 4"

"Episode 3", also known as "Rest in Pain", (Note: Although the series originally did not have episode titles, when it was broadcast in Germany the episodes were given titles that are now used by some fans and critics.) is the fourth episode of the first season of the American surrealist mystery horror drama television series Twin Peaks. The episode was written by Harley Peyton, and directed by Tina Rathborne. "Episode 3" features series regulars Kyle MacLachlan, Michael Ontkean and Ray Wise, and introduces Sheryl Lee's second role, Maddy Ferguson.

Rathborne has highlighted the episode's introduction of Jungian analytical psychology to the series. She also described MacLachlan's character Dale Cooper as not only a wholesome, grounded anchor against which the series' more bizarre elements could be contrasted; but as the central component of the series' coming-of-age "Bildungsroman" narrative.

"Episode 3" was first broadcast on April 26, 1990, and was viewed by approximately 18 percent of the available audience in its initial airing. The episode received positive reviews from critics, with its mix of comedy and tragedy seen as a highlight, and Miguel Ferrer's character Albert Rosenfield singled out as a particularly successful example of this. The episode also drew praise from The New York Times for its compelling and unusual cast of characters.

== Plot ==
=== Background ===
The small town of Twin Peaks, Washington, has been shocked by the murder of schoolgirl Laura Palmer (Sheryl Lee) and the attempted murder of her friend Ronette Pulaski (Phoebe Augustine). Federal Bureau of Investigation special agent Dale Cooper (Kyle MacLachlan) has come to the town to investigate, and initial suspicion has fallen upon Palmer's boyfriend Bobby Briggs (Dana Ashbrook) and the man with whom she was cheating on Briggs, James Hurley (James Marshall). However, other inhabitants of the town have their own suspicions: the violent, drug-dealing truck driver Leo Johnson (Eric Da Re) is seen as a possible suspect. Cooper experiences a surreal dream in which a dwarf and a woman resembling Laura reveal the identity of the killer.

=== Events ===
Cooper and Audrey Horne (Sherilyn Fenn) share breakfast, as he realizes she had slipped a note under his hotel room door; the note referred to One-Eyed Jacks, a brothel over the Canada–US border. When she leaves, Cooper discusses his dream with Sheriff Harry S. Truman (Michael Ontkean), believing it to be a coded solution to the murder.

Cooper's colleague, Albert Rosenfield (Miguel Ferrer) wishes to conduct a further post-mortem on Laura's body, but it is due to be released for the funeral that day. As the argument grows more heated, Truman ends it by punching Rosenfield and knocking him down. Later, Rosenfield shares what he has found; Laura had been bound when she was killed, had been addicted to cocaine, and had been clawed by a bird. An unidentified plastic shard was also found in her stomach.

Leland Palmer (Ray Wise) is at home when he is visited by his niece, Madeline Ferguson (Lee). Ferguson is identical to Laura save for having black hair, not blonde. At the same time, Cooper and Truman question Johnson about Laura's death, believing him to be lying when he denies knowing her. Later, Hurley arrives at Laura's funeral late, watching from a distance. Briggs begins to accost the mourners, accusing them of doing nothing when they knew Laura had been troubled. Hurley intervenes and the two begin fighting; Leland falls on the casket as it is being lowered into the grave, sobbing uncontrollably.

That night, Cooper, Truman, Deputy Hawk (Michael Horse) and Ed Hurley (Everett McGill) meet at the RR Diner. Truman explains that someone has been smuggling cocaine into town; he suspects that Jacques Renault (Walter Olkewicz), bartender at the town's Roadhouse Bar, is involved. He also explains that the woods around the town seem to contain a "darkness", and reveals that there is a secret society of men gathered to stand watch against this: the Bookhouse Boys. Truman and the others bring Cooper to their headquarters, where James has Jacques' brother Bernard (Clay Wilcox) bound and gagged. They question Bernard but he denies any crime.

Elsewhere, Jacques realizes his brother is in trouble, and calls Johnson for help. When Johnson leaves, his abused wife Shelly (Mädchen Amick) hides a gun in a secret drawer. Meanwhile, sawmill owner Josie Packard (Joan Chen) tells Truman, her lover, that her sister-in-law Catherine Martell (Piper Laurie) is scheming to take over the mill. Packard knows there are two account books, one fake and one real, but cannot locate the real one Martell has been hiding.

== Production ==
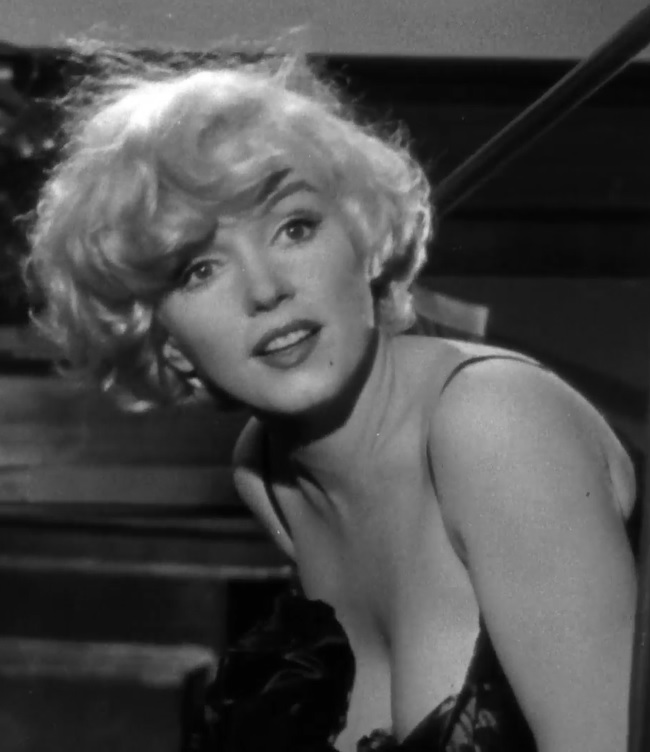
The episode opens with a shot of Sherilyn Fenn, who director Tina Rathborne compared to Marilyn Monroe (pictured, 1959 from the trailer for the film Some Like It Hot).

"Episode 3" was the first of the series to be written by Harley Peyton; Peyton returned to pen a number of other episodes across both seasons. The episode was directed by Tina Rathborne, who would also go on to helm "Episode 17" in the second season. Rathborne had previously worked with series co-creator David Lynch when she had cast him in her 1988 feature film Zelly and Me.

The episode introduces the character of Maddy Ferguson, Laura's nearly identical cousin, the second role in the series played by Sheryl Lee. Lee had been a stage actor living in Washington, where "Pilot" was filmed, and had remained there after production moved to Los Angeles as she believed that, with her character dead, she would have no further part in the series. However, Lynch was impressed with her performance and called to ask her to return, telling her he would "figure [...] out" a way for her to continue appearing.

Rathborne chose to open the episode with a shot centered on Sherilyn Fenn, finding the actress to be "seductive" and "absorbing" in a similar manner to screen icon Marilyn Monroe. Rathborne had initially worried that the episode featured too many static scenes of characters sitting and talking, with little action, and asked Lynch if she could borrow some of the imagery of the previous episode's surreal dream sequence to keep these conversations more interesting, adding brief snippets of footage as Cooper discussed the dream with the others. Rathborne has noted that this dream-centric approach to the character of Cooper is rooted in Carl Jung's theories of analytical psychology. She felt this was something that had not been seen on television before, and credits Lynch with introducing it to the series. She has also described the narrative, both of "Episode 3" and of Twin Peaks as a whole, as a "Bildungsroman" showing Cooper's development into a more rounded and enlightened person.

Working on studio sets was a new experience for Rathborne, whose previous work had all been filmed on location. She also found it refreshing to work with the series' ensemble cast, recalling that Miguel Ferrer often had the cast and crew laughing at the way he approached his material, imbuing the atmosphere during filming with a mix of comedy and drama. Rathborne has also noted the use of ordinary, almost banal, daily life in the series, finding it a necessary element to be able to play the series' more violent and surreal elements against effectively. She particularly singled out Cooper as a wholesome "boy next door" character who allowed the town's more unusual residents to stand out more starkly.

== Broadcast and reception ==
To stand out in Twin Peaks with its superb ensemble cast is an incredible feat, but Albert Rosenfield managed it. A total asshole from the second he emerged in the town, he was a true delight to watch as he took acerbic wit and abrasiveness to new levels – amidst much hilarity

— Digital Spy's Tony Delgado on Ferrer's role as Albert Rosenfield

"Episode 3" was first broadcast by the American Broadcasting Company (ABC) on April 19, 1990. In its initial airing, it was viewed by 11.3 percent of US households, representing 18 percent of the available audience. This marked a slight decline from the previous episode, which had attracted 13.1 percent of the population and 21 percent of the available audience.

The A.V. Club's Keith Phipps rated the episode a B+, finding that it struggled to live up to the preceding episode; however, he felt that this was understandable, as "after pushing television to the limits of sanity there was nowhere to go but back". Phipps also described the funeral scene as a highlight of the episode, finding that he grew to appreciate its mix of tragic and comic more over repeated viewings. Writing for Allrovi, Andrea LeVasseur rated the episode four stars out of five.

John J. O'Connor, writing for The New York Times praised the episode, stating that it features "the most bizarrely compelling collection of characters ever to hit prime time". O'Connor spoke positively of the intricate plot seen in the episode and the series as a whole, noting that "the overall narrative is paramount" and affirming his belief that the series "seems to have been mapped out carefully" by Lynch and Frost. Television Without Pity's Daniel J. Blau praised the episode's black humour, singling out in particular the scene in which Ferrer's character is punched after an argument in the town morgue. However, Blau was critical of guest stars Olkewicz and Wilcox, finding their attempted French-Canadian accents particularly poor. Writing for Digital Spy, Tony Delgado has also praised Ferrer's role as Rosenfield, adding that his dialogue "may not appear to be the epitome of wit, but the way [Ferrer] delivered such lines caused plenty of howling hysterics in living rooms across the globe".

== Footnotes ==
=== Bibliography ===
- Rathborne, Tina (2001), Episode 3: Commentary, Twin Peaks: The Complete First Season: Artisan Entertainment
- Riches, Simon (2011). "Intuition and Investigation into Another Place: The Epistemological Role of Dreaming in Twin Peaks and Beyond". In Devlin, William J.; Biderman, Shai (eds.). The Philosophy of David Lynch. Lexington: University Press of Kentucky. ISBN 978-0-8131-3396-6.
