= Harley Peyton =

American screenwriter

Harley Peyton is an American screenwriter and television producer. He worked in both capacities on Twin Peaks and was nominated for the 1990 Primetime Emmy Award for Outstanding Writing in a Drama Series for his work on the series' third episode.

== Biography ==
He went to Harvard and Stanford.

Peyton began, working on feature films in the 1980s and 1990s. He performed rewrites on several studio productions, and adapted the Dave Robicheaux novel Heaven's Prisoners by James Lee Burke into a 1996 feature film. 2009's In the Electric Mist, also featuring Robicheaux (albeit played by Tommy Lee Jones), acted as a sequel, but Peyton was not involved.

Peyton also expanded into television in the 1990s, writing and creating series such as Moon Over Miami and Route 66. Other series Peyton has worked on include Dracula, Reign and Dominion. He scripted the superhero series Three Inches for Syfy, but it was never ordered to series. In 2021, he created Reginald the Vampire for Syfy. It was renewed for a second season but was canceled in 2024.

== Filmography ==
=== Films ===
| Year | Film | Credit | Notes |
|---|---|---|---|
| 1987 | Less than Zero | Screenplay By | |
| 1991 | Danger Team | Writer | Television Movie |
| 1993 | The Three Musketeers | Screenplay By | Uncredited Revision |
| 1996 | Bullet Hearts | Executive Producer | Television Movie |
| 1996 | Heaven's Prisoners | Screenplay By | Co-Wrote Screenplay with Scott Frank |
| 1997 | Keys to Tulsa | Writer, Producer, Second Unit Director | |
| 1997 | Gold Coast | Screenplay By | Television Movie |
| 2001 | Bandits | Writer, Executive Producer | |
| 2004 | Catwoman | Screenplay By | Uncredited Revision |
| 2011 | Friends with Benefits | Story By | Co-Wrote Story with Keith Merryman and David A. Newman |
| 2011 | Three Inches | Executive Producer | Television Movie |
| 2016 | JL Ranch | Written By | Television Movie |

=== Television ===
| Year | TV Series | Credit | Notes |
|---|---|---|---|
| 1990–1991 | Twin Peaks | Writer, Producer | |
| 1993 | Route 66 | Creator, Co-Executive Producer | |
| 1993 | Moon Over Miami | Creator, Writer, Executive Producer | |
| 2007 | The Bronx is Burning | Writer | Episode "The Straw" |
| 2012–2013 | Wedding Band | Writer, Consulting Producer | |
| 2013–2014 | Dracula | Writer, Co-Executive Producer | |
| 2014–2015 | Reign | Writer, Executive Producer | |
| 2015 | Dominion | Writer | Episode "The Longest Mile Home" |
| 2016 | Dark Matter | Writer | Episode "She's One of Them Now" |
| 2016–2018 | Channel Zero | Writer, Executive Producer | |
| 2019–2020 | Project Blue Book | Writer, Co-Executive Producer | |
| 2021–2024 | Chucky | Writer, Executive Producer | |
| 2021–2024 | Reginald the Vampire | Creator, Writer, Executive Producer | |
