= Episode 5 (Twin Peaks) =

- Twin Peaks episode
- Episode no.: Season 1 Episode 6
- Directed by: Lesli Linka Glatter
- Written by: Mark Frost
- Original air date: May 10, 1990
- Running time: 46 minutes

Guest appearances
- Chris Mulkey as Hank Jennings; David Patrick Kelly as Jerry Horne; Don Davis as Major Garland Briggs; Charlotte Stewart as Betty Briggs; Don Amendolia as Emory Battis; Catherine E. Coulson as Margaret Lanterman / "The Log Lady"

Episode chronology
← Previous "Episode 4"	Next → "Episode 6"

"Episode 5," also known as "Cooper's Dreams," (Note: Although the series originally did not have episode titles, when it was broadcast in Germany the episodes were given titles that are now used by some fans and critics.) is the sixth episode of the first season of the American surrealist mystery horror drama television series Twin Peaks. The episode was written by series co-creator Mark Frost and directed by Lesli Linka Glatter. "Episode 5" features series regulars Kyle MacLachlan, Michael Ontkean and Richard Beymer, with guest appearances by Chris Mulkey and David Patrick Kelly.

Glatter has noted that the episode exemplifies the themes of longing and desire which she feels characterize the series; she has also called to attention its careful balance between tragic and comic elements. Exterior scenes in the episode were filmed in California's Angeles National Forest and blended with stock footage of Washington to enhance the setting.

FBI agent Dale Cooper (MacLachlan) and Twin Peaks sheriff Harry Truman (Ontkean) continue to investigate a murder in the small mountain town, while local businessman Benjamin Horne (Beymer) schemes to burn down its sawmill to further his property empire. First airing on May 10, 1990, "Episode 5" was viewed by approximately 18 percent of the available audience during its broadcast; it has received positive reviews from critics.

== Plot ==
=== Background ===
The small town of Twin Peaks, Washington, has been shocked by the murder of schoolgirl Laura Palmer (Sheryl Lee) and the attempted murder of her friend Ronette Pulaski (Phoebe Augustine). Federal Bureau of Investigation special agent Dale Cooper (Kyle MacLachlan) has come to the town to investigate, and initial suspicion has fallen upon Palmer's boyfriend Bobby Briggs (Dana Ashbrook) and the man with whom she was cheating on Briggs, James Hurley (James Marshall). However, other inhabitants of the town have their own suspicions: the violent, drug-dealing truck driver Leo Johnson (Eric Da Re) is seen as a possible suspect, especially to his wife Shelly (Mädchen Amick), who has found a bloodstained shirt among his belongings.

=== Events ===
Cooper is woken early by the sound of a raucous party in the Great Northern Hotel. He leaves to meet Truman, while Jerry Horne (David Patrick Kelly) meets his brother Benjamin (Richard Beymer) to discuss the new Icelandic investors in their property developments. Leland Palmer (Ray Wise) arrives, disoriented and wishing to return to work, but the Hornes send him home. Cooper, Truman and Doctor Hayward (Warren Frost) discuss Johnson's bloodied shirt, learning that the blood is not Laura's but that of drug smuggler Jacques Renault.

Johnson's wife Shelly is having breakfast with her lover Bobby Briggs; the two roleplay the idea of shooting Johnson, while they toy with Shelly's pistol. When Deputy Andy Brennan (Harry Goaz) arrives to enquire about Johnson, Briggs hides and Shelly attempts to make Johnson seem deeply involved in Laura's death and Renault's disappearance. Elsewhere, lovers Ed Hurley (Everett McGill) and Norma Jennings (Peggy Lipton) meet to discuss their spouses. Jennings' husband Hank (Chris Mulkey) has been released from prison, while Hurley's volatile wife Nadine is increasingly becoming mentally unwell. Jennings leaves, feeling that things are going nowhere, leaving Hurley crestfallen. Meanwhile, Audrey Horne (Sherilyn Fenn) is interviewed for a job at her father's department store and blackmails the interviewer into giving her a position at the shop's perfume counter—where Laura and Ronette Pulaski worked before their abduction.

Madeline Ferguson (Lee) meets with James Hurley and Donna Hayward (Lara Flynn Boyle) at the RR Diner. They discuss Laura's death; Hurley and Hayward believe Laura hid a diary at her home and want Ferguson, who is now staying there, to look for it. They leave as Jennings and Shelly arrive; Hank is seated at another table and pulls Jennings aside to ask to start working in order to regain her trust.

Meanwhile, Cooper, Truman, Hawk and Doc Hayward visit the Log Lady and ask her log what it saw the night Laura Palmer died. Using a photograph from Renault's home and the clues from Cooper's dream, the investigators then find a log cabin in the woods that they believe to be the scene of the murder; on the floor Cooper finds a One Eyed Jack's casino chip that matches the piece found in Laura's stomach, and Truman finds Waldo, Jacques' myna bird.

That same afternoon, Bobby attends family counseling with Dr. Jacoby (Russ Tamblyn), the town psychiatrist who also saw Laura as a patient prior to her death. Bobby is initially dismissive of Jacoby's attempt at analysis, but once he is isolated from his parents, he breaks down and confesses that Laura had told him that she wanted to die, and that she had pressured Bobby into dealing drugs so that she could use them herself.

At a party in the Great Northern to welcome the new investors, Benjamin and Catherine Martell (Piper Laurie) secretly discuss their plan to burn the town's sawmill the following night and buy the land cheaply, unaware that Audrey is spying on them. Leland begins sobbing hysterically when a piece of music begins, and Martell escorts him away. Benjamin then finds Josie, to whom he revealed the location of Catherine's faked account book. Madeline calls Donna and informs her of a tape she found hidden in Laura's bedpost. Shelly waits at home with Bobby's gun as Johnson arrives. Hank attacks him beside his truck, threatening him; Johnson walks inside and lashes out at Shelly, who draws the gun and shoots him.

Coming back home to the sound of the Icelanders singing, Agent Cooper is suspicious of someone in his dark room. He points his gun and says to turn on the light. Audrey Horne is naked in his bed, and she begs him to let her stay.

== Production ==
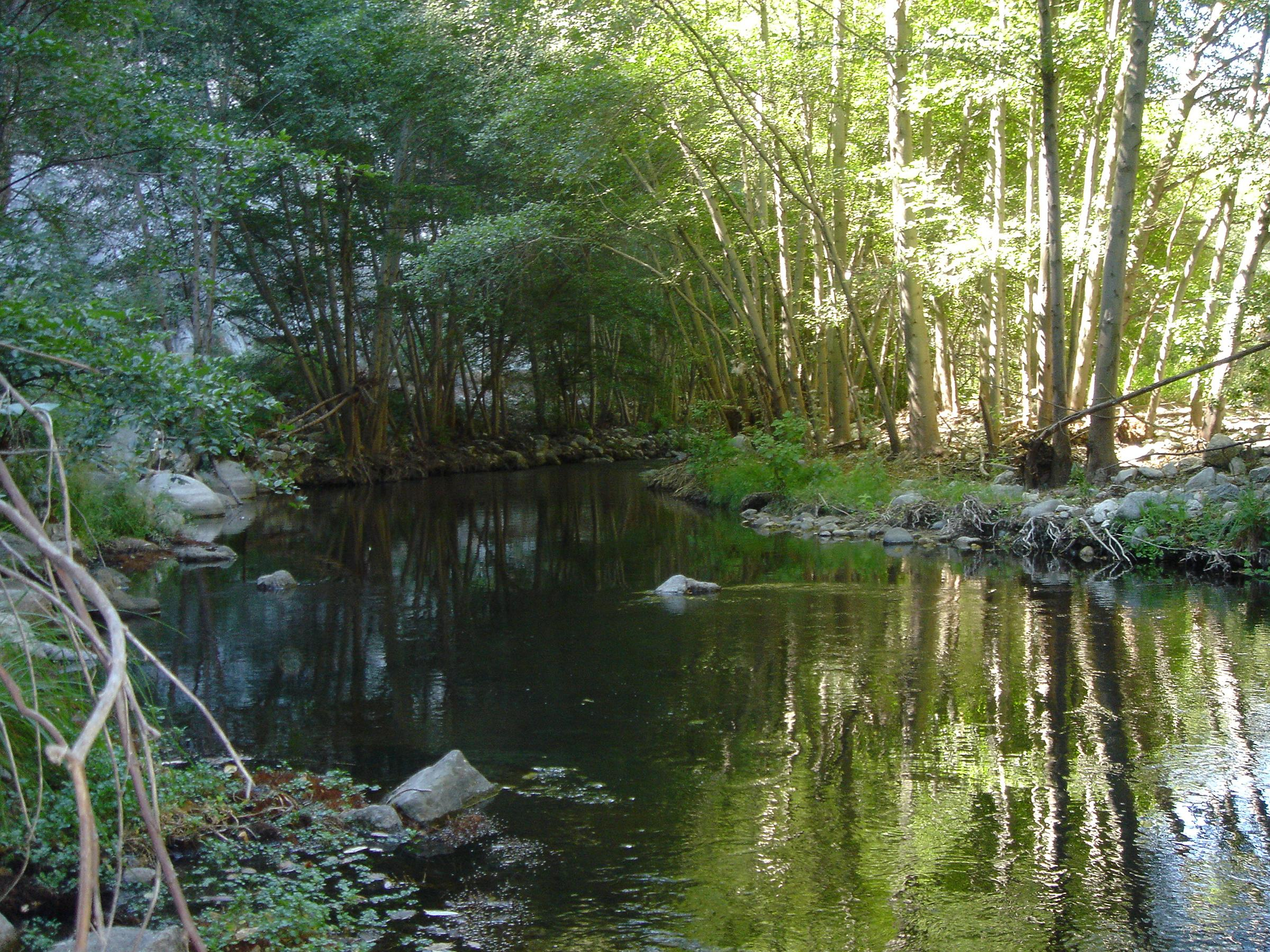
External shots in the episode were filmed in Angeles National Forest.

"Episode 5" was written by Mark Frost, who created Twin Peaks along with David Lynch. Frost had previously penned "Pilot", "Episode 1" and "Episode 2" with Lynch; this was his first solo writing credit for the series, and he would pen a further seven episodes as the series progressed. The episode was directed by Lesli Linka Glatter, making her first contribution to the series. Glatter later returned to helm three more episodes in the second season.

Glatter has praised MacLachlan's involvement in his role, believing that he fully embraced and explored the character of Cooper; she noted that he was as devoted to the character's comedic elements as to his dramatic side and that the crew had difficulty completing takes featuring Cooper without laughing at his comic delivery. She has also noted that although the writers and directors on the series tended to emphasize the rapport between Cooper and Fenn's character Audrey Horne, there was never any intention to bring the characters together as a couple.

Glatter also highlighted Da Re's menacing character, finding it to be a contrast to the actor's real-life "sweet" personality. Da Re's mother, Johanna Ray, was the casting director for Twin Peaks. Glatter similarly lauded the comic performances of most of the cast, particularly singling out the "dry wit" of Beymer and his chemistry with guest star Kelly. She felt that the series struck a good balance between its humorous elements and its dark subject matter, playing its serious moments with an appropriate level of gravitas and avoiding becoming a "self parody". She also has expressed her belief that the main thematic concern of the series was "longing", and that most characters were driven by their desires for each other; she particularly noted the affair between Briggs and Shelley Johnson as an example of this expressed, but secret, longing.

Throughout the series, scenes set in the Great Northern Hotel's dining room—seen at the beginning of most episodes—almost always featured a convention of some sort, whether this was intended to be noticed or not. "Episode 5" features a group of American Indian Movement members in this capacity. Exterior scenes in the woods were filmed at Angeles National Forest in California and blended with establishing shots of the Washington landscape that had been filmed to provide the series with stock footage.

== Broadcast and reception ==
"Episode 5" was first broadcast on the American Broadcasting Company on May 10, 1990. In its initial airing, it was viewed by 11.5 percent of US households, 18 percent of the available audience. For the following episode, these figures would drop to 10.6 percent of the population and 17 percent of the available audience.

Writing for The A.V. Club, Keith Phipps rated the episode an "A−", noting the scene in which Leland breaks down while dancing to "Pennsylvania 6-5000" as a highlight. Phipps felt that the episode advanced the plotlines of the series and the development of its characters equally well, adding that it showed Twin Peaks "wasn't just a fleeting phenomenon but an honest-to-goodness great show". AllRovi's Andrea LeVasseur awarded the episode four stars out of five. Daniel J. Blau of Television Without Pity pointed out the sexual undertones of the episode, noting in particular Briggs and Shelley's playing with a pistol as clear phallic imagery. However, Blau was heavily critical of Marshall's acting, finding his performance to be a "train wreck".

== Footnotes ==
=== Bibliography ===
- Glatter, Lesli Linka (2001), Episode 5: Commentary (DVD), Twin Peaks: The Complete First Season: Artisan Entertainment
- Riches, Simon (2011). "Intuition and Investigation into Another Place: The Epistemological Role of Dreaming in Twin Peaks and Beyond". In Devlin, William J.; Biderman, Shai (eds.). The Philosophy of David Lynch. Lexington: University Press of Kentucky. ISBN 978-0-8131-3396-6.
