= Eric Da Re =

American actor

- Born: March 3, 1965 (age 61); Los Angeles, California, U.S.
- Occupation: Actor
- Years active: 1987—2002
- Parents: Johanna Ray; Aldo Ray

Eric Da Re (born March 3, 1965) is an American actor who played Leo Johnson on the TV show Twin Peaks and its prequel film, Twin Peaks: Fire Walk with Me. He has worked behind the scenes in several other films by Twin Peaks creator David Lynch. He is the son of the actor Aldo Da Re (stage name Aldo Ray) and the casting director Johanna Ray, a frequent Lynch collaborator.

== Biography ==
Da Re was born in Los Angeles, California, United States. He is the son of the actor Aldo Ray (born Aldo Da Re), and is of Italian descent on his father's side. His mother is Johanna Ray, an award-winning casting director (Blue Velvet, Mulholland Drive, Showgirls), who did casting for Twin Peaks.

Da Re's first role was in the TV movie Into the Homeland in 1987, which was directed by Lesli Linka Glatter, who would direct Da Re on Twin Peaks. Da Re appeared in the 1989 slasher film Silent Night, Deadly Night 3: Better Watch Out! (which also featured his future Twin Peaks co-star Richard Beymer); after a few more roles in TV movies, Da Re landed the role of Leo Johnson in the 1990 cult classic Twin Peaks, created by Mark Frost and David Lynch. Da Re went on to work with Lynch again as a casting assistant for Wild at Heart (1990), as Leo Johnson in the Twin Peaks cinematic prequel, Twin Peaks: Fire Walk with Me (1992) and as a property buyer for Lost Highway (1997).

In 1992 he was Bernie in Critters 4. He also had roles in the Paul Verhoeven film Starship Troopers (1997) and in Ted Bundy (2002).

He is sometimes credited as Eric Da Re, Eric DaRae or Eric Dare.

Eric attended Horace Mann elementary and Beverly Hills High School with fellow actor Nicolas Cage.

== Filmography ==
=== Film ===
Year	Title	Role	Notes
1987	Into the Homeland	Male Surfer #1	TV movie
1989	Silent Night, Deadly Night 3: Better Watch Out!	Chris (as Eric Da Re)	Direct-to-video
1992	Twin Peaks: Fire Walk with Me	Leo Johnson	
1992	Critters 4	Bernie	
1994	Dead Connection	Anthony the Bouncer	
1995	The Takeover	Venoku	Direct-to-video
1995	Number One Fan	Randall McSwain	
1996	The Disappearance of Kevin Johnson	Apartment Manager (as Eric da Re)	
1997	Playing God	Digiacomo	
1997	Starship Troopers	Medic	
1997	The Player		TV movie
1998	Poodle Springs	Guard	TV movie
2000	Lured Innocence	Bartender (as Eric DaRae)	
2001	Delivering Milo	Doctor	
2002	Ted Bundy	Male Partygoer (as Eric Dare)	

=== Television ===
Year	Title	Role	Notes
1990	The Flash	Tyrone	Episode: "Pilot"
1990–1991	Twin Peaks	Leo Johnson	24 episodes
1993	SeaQuest DSV	Maxwell	Episode: "To Be or Not to Be"
2000	NieA under 7	Nenji Yoshioka (voice only)	13 episodes
2017	Twin Peaks	Leo Johnson	Episode: "Part 17" (archive footage)
