= Part 2 (Twin Peaks) =

- Twin Peaks episode
- Laura Palmer (Sheryl Lee) whispers inside the ear of FBI Special Agent Dale Cooper (Kyle MacLachlan).
- Episode no.: Season 3 Episode 2
- Directed by: David Lynch
- Written by: David Lynch; Mark Frost
- Cinematography by: Peter Deming
- Editing by: Duwayne Dunham
- Original air date: May 21, 2017
- Running time: 54 minutes

Guest appearances
- Joe Adler as Roger; Mädchen Amick as Shelly; Steve Baker as Jack; Brent Briscoe as Detective Dave Macklay; Gia Carides as Hannah; Catherine Coulson as Margaret Lanterman / "The Log Lady"; Neil Dickson as George; Patrick Fischler as Duncan Todd; Balthazar Getty as Red; George Griffith as Ray Monroe; Cornelia Guest as Phyllis Hastings; Michael Horse as Deputy Chief Tommy "Hawk" Hill; Nicole LaLiberte as Darya; Sheryl Lee as Laura Palmer; Jennifer Jason Leigh as Chantal Hutchens; Matthew Lillard as William Hastings; James Marshall as James Hurley; Walter Olkewicz as Jean-Michel Renault; Benjamin Rosenfield as Sam Colby; Frank Silva as Killer BOB; Al Strobel as Phillip Michael Gerard / MIKE; Jessica Szohr as Renee; Jake Wardle as Freddie Sykes; Ray Wise as Leland Palmer; Grace Zabriskie as Sarah Palmer; Madeline Zima as Tracey Barberato

Episode chronology
| ← Previous "Part 1" | Next → "Part 3" |

"Part 2", also known as "The Stars Turn and a Time Presents Itself", (Note: Episodes did not originally air with titles, but the promotional quotes for each episode were later used as titles in the Blu-ray release of this season) is the second episode of the third season of the American surrealist mystery horror drama television series Twin Peaks. It was written by series creators Mark Frost and David Lynch, directed by Lynch, and stars Kyle MacLachlan.

"Part 2" was first broadcast on Showtime, along with "Part 1", on May 21, 2017, and was seen by an audience of 506,000 viewers in the United States. In addition, the two episodes were shown as a feature at the 2017 Cannes Film Festival, where they received a standing ovation. The episode received critical acclaim.

== Plot ==
The stars turn and a time presents itself.

— Margaret Lanterman (used as a promotional tagline for the episode)

=== Background ===
The small town of Twin Peaks, Washington, has been shocked by the murder of schoolgirl Laura Palmer (Sheryl Lee) and the attempted murder of her friend Ronette Pulaski (Phoebe Augustine). FBI special agent Dale Cooper (Kyle MacLachlan) has been sent to the town to investigate and has discovered that the killer was Laura's father, Leland Palmer (Ray Wise), who acted while possessed by a demonic entity, Killer BOB (Frank Silva). At the end of the original series, BOB trapped Cooper in the Black Lodge, an extra-dimensional place, and let out Cooper's doppelgänger to use him for physical access to the world. 25 years later, Cooper's doppelgänger roams freely through the world, with Cooper still inside the Lodge. Meanwhile, in New York City, Sam Colby (Benjamin Rosenfield) has been hired to observe a glass cube; when he brings Tracey Barberato (Madeline Zima) into the room and the two start having sex, a creature, the Experiment Model (Erica Aynon), appears in the glass box, breaks out of it, and slaughters them. In Buckhorn, South Dakota, school principal William Hastings (Matthew Lillard) is accused of murdering Ruth Davenport (Mary Stofle), the school librarian, much to the chagrin of his wife, Phyllis (Cornelia Guest).

=== Events ===
In Buckhorn, Hastings sits inside his cell, seemingly anxious. Detective Dave Macklay (Brent Briscoe) accompanies Hastings's wife Phyllis in the cell, warning them that the visit will be short; Hastings thanks him. Phyllis tells Hastings that according to their attorney, George Bautzer (Neil Dickson), he will not be released on bail; Hastings insists that he did not kill Davenport, but says he dreamt about being there. Phyllis insists that he was there, and reveals that she knew about his affair with Davenport; Hastings responds that he knew she was having an affair with George and possibly someone else. She taunts him with the prospect of a life in prison; Macklay comes to dismiss Phyllis, leaving Hastings in despair. At the station's entrance, Phyllis meets George, informs him that Bill is aware of their affair, and instructs him not to walk her out and to meet her later at her place; George then discusses with Macklay how Hastings and Phyllis feel. Two cells away from Hastings, a dark figure (Note: Eventually, the dark figures will be identified during Part 8 as the Woodsmen.) (Stewart Strauss (Note: Strauss is uncredited in the episode.)) sits on the bed and disappears, leaving only its head to float upward. Phyllis returns home; in the living room, she finds Cooper's doppelgänger, whom she recognizes and greets as a pleasant surprise. The doppelgänger says that she followed human nature perfectly and then shoots her in the head with George's gun, which he then drops.

In Las Vegas, Nevada, Duncan Todd (Patrick Fischler) calls Roger (Joe Adler) in his office; after handing him money, he instructs him to tell "her" that she has the job. Roger asks Todd why he lets "him" do "these things," to which Todd replies that Roger had better not get involved with people like "him".

In a restaurant, Cooper's doppelgänger eats creamed corn with Darya (Nicole LaLiberte), Ray (George Griffith) and Jack (Steve Baker). Ray sarcastically remarks that Jack barely touched his "three dinners"; he then discusses the plan for the coming days with the doppelgänger, who says he will need to be on his own for a while. Ray assures the doppelgänger that he will get the information he needs from Betty, Hastings's secretary; the doppelgänger replies that he doesn't need the information, but wants it.

In the Ghostwood forest, Hawk (Michael Horse) searches through the woods with a flashlight. He receives a call from Margaret Lanterman (Catherine Coulson), who asks him where he is walking. When Hawk replies that something is supposed to happen there, Margaret says, "the stars turn and the time presents itself," and tells Hawk to be careful, inviting him for coffee and pie at her house. Hawk thanks her and promises to tell her what happens, then ends the call; he arrives at Glastonbury Grove, where red curtains faintly appear and disappear.

Cooper sits in the Red Room. MIKE (Al Strobel) asks him "is it future or is it past", then tells him someone is there and disappears. An older Laura enters and sits in one of the chairs. She salutes Cooper, informs him that he can go now and asks him if he recognizes her. In an almost verbatim reenactment of his dream, Cooper asks Laura if she is Laura Palmer, and she replies, "I feel like I know her, but sometimes my arms bend back." When Cooper asks who she is, she confirms that she is Laura, and when he replies that Laura is dead she says "I am dead, yet I live." She removes her face, revealing a pulsating white light, and closes it back. Cooper asks when he can go; in another repetition of Cooper's dream, Laura walks over to him, kisses him and whispers in his ear. (Note: A female voice can be faintly heard saying "Whisper" as Laura leans onto Cooper.) Laura pulls back; an unseen force moves the curtains and she screams before being pulled away in front of Cooper. The curtains billow and take off, revealing a pale horse standing on the seemingly endless chevron floor and darkness. MIKE reappears and asks Cooper again "is it future or is it past;" he then leads Cooper to another room, where he presents him to "the evolution of the arm", a flashing giant neuron structure resembling a barren tree, with a soft-mouthed brain on top as a head. (Note: The original actor for the arm, Michael J. Anderson, did not return to the role. The voice actor for the arm is uncredited.) Repeating the lines he once told Cooper, the arm says, "I am the arm and I sound like this", followed by a looping sound. He asks Cooper whether he remembers his doppelgänger, and says that the doppelgänger must come in for Cooper to go out.

Jack closes a garage door with one of Cooper's doppelgänger's cars inside, and hands the doppelgänger the keys to another car. Before leaving, the doppelgänger calls Jack to him, grabs his face and strokes it.

The doppelgänger goes to a motel, where Darya quickly hangs up the phone and tells him she was talking to Jack to ensure that the job is done "on the secretary's car"; she tells him that she's happy to see him. The doppelgänger tells her Ray never showed up for their meeting, and that he might borrow her gun for a job. He lies next to her and hugs her, then tells her that he killed Jack after discovering that he wired the car. Darya tries to escape, but the doppelgänger smashes her head against the headboard of the bed and plays a recording of her phone conversation with Ray, in which the two discuss his imprisonment in a South Dakota federal prison for interstate transportation of firearms and their task to assassinate Mr. C, which was assigned to them by a man named Jeffries and is now entrusted entirely to her. Darya tries to escape once again, and the doppelgänger smashes her head against the headboard thrice. He asks her to reveal the name of the man who paid for his assassination, which Darya does not know, but who, she discloses, paid $500,000 to split between her and Ray. She says she wasn't going to do it, but the doppelgänger brushes this off. He then says that the following day he is supposed to be pulled back into the Black Lodge but that he has a plan for that. He asks her if she received any information from Ray, saying that a set of coordinates and numbers may save her life; Darya did not receive any information, but knows that Hastings's secretary revealed something to Ray. The doppelgänger pulls an ace of spades card from his jacket, with the symbol covered by a scribbling of a black sphere with two thin protrusions like antennae, and tells Darya that is what he wants. She asks him whether he's going to kill her, and he responds affirmatively; she tries to escape again, after which the doppelgänger punches her in the face, then shoots her after covering her face with a pillow. The doppelgänger washes his hands and calls the man he believes to be Jeffries. (Note: The voice actor for the Phillip Jeffries is uncredited in this episode; in the rest of the season, Phillip Jeffries is voiced by Nathan Frizzel, whose voice sounds conspicuously different from this episode. Consequently, many consider the character speaking on the phone to be a different character from the original Jeffries, possibly an impostor.) The voice on the other end of the phone says he missed him in New York and that the doppelgänger is still in Buckhorn. He then asks whether Mr. C met Major Briggs, much to the doppelgänger's astonishment. The voice then says that he just called to say goodbye, and that the doppelgänger is "going back in" the following day so that he will be with BOB again, then disconnects. The doppelgänger, now uncertain if the man on the other end of the line truly was Jeffries, opens a laptop and logs into an FBI database to download files related to Yankton Federal Prison, where Ray claims to be.

The doppelgänger leaves the room and enters into the next one, where Chantal Hutchens (Jennifer Jason Leigh) is staying. He orders her to clean up his room; gathering that he killed Darya, Chantal says it is a good thing, since she was getting jealous of her. The doppelgänger tells her that he needs her and her husband to be in a specific location in the following days; he then calls her to him, opens her bathrobe and touches her groin area, saying she is "nice and wet".

In the Black Lodge the arm says, "253. Time and time again." It repeats BOB's name three times, then orders Cooper to go twice. Cooper follows MIKE into a hallway; when he is in, MIKE disappears. Cooper proceeds to another entrance but finds it blocked; he walks back into the room he came from, which is now empty, and crosses to the other side. He finds himself in another hallway, which leads him to a room where Leland Palmer sits; he tells Cooper to "find Laura." Cooper is attracted by a shining light into another room, which seemingly distorts itself on two overlapping levels, one moving towards the curtains on the opposite side and one moving from them; he then has a vision of a Venus of Arles statue. MIKE senses that something is wrong, and the arm states that it's his doppelgänger. From the room, Cooper walks into another hallway, where he sees the statue; he opens the entrance next to it, and from it he sees his doppelgänger driving on a road in South Dakota. The statue morphs into a doppelgänger of the arm, identical to it except for the yellow color of its brain; the stripes forming the chevron pattern of the floor begin to move upward and downward under Cooper's feet and, as the doppelgänger screams "non-exist-ent," they open up horizontally, causing Cooper to fall into a black liquid. Cooper is transported on the exterior Glass Box in New York City and sucked inside; he floats through a tube and inside the box. Sam Colby checks the bathroom for the guard, but it's empty, so he decides to let Tracey Barberato in. As they are about to enter, the box trembles and repeatedly creates inside itself a series of matryoshka-like copies of its insides, back and forth, until Cooper disappears. He proceeds to fall through space.

Inside the Palmer House, Sarah Palmer (Grace Zabriskie) watches gruesome footage of a pack of lions killing an African buffalo. (Note: Similarly to an analogous accident in the Pilot, it is possible to spot a hand holding a camera in the mirrors behind Sarah Palmer.)

At the Roadhouse, the band Chromatics (Ruth Radelet, Adam Miller, Johnny Jewel, Nat Walker) performs its song "Shadow". Shelly (Mädchen Amick) takes a tequila shot with her friends Hannah (Gia Carides) and Renee (Jessica Szohr); she says Steven is not the right husband for her daughter, Becky. When James Hurley (James Marshall) enters the Roadhouse with his friend Freddie Sykes (Jake Wardle), the group comments on the fact that he might like Renee. Shelly says there's nothing wrong with James, that he had a motorcycle accident and that "James was always cool." From the bar counter, Red (Balthazar Getty) winks at Shelly, while Jean-Michel Renault (Walter Olkewicz) serves drinks.

== Production ==
"Part 2", like the rest of the limited series, was written by Mark Frost and David Lynch and directed by Lynch. The episode is dedicated to the memory of Frank Silva, who appears in archival footage.

=== Music ===
Almost every episode of the 2017 Twin Peaks series featured a live performance by a band at the Roadhouse. In this episode the American electronic music band Chromatics performs its song "Shadow". Additionally, several sped-up fragments of Lynch's song "Last Call" from his 2013 album The Big Dream are hidden during the scene in the Palmer house.

== Reception ==
=== Broadcast ===
"Part 2" was originally broadcast on the Showtime network together with Part 1 on May 22, 2017. The initial broadcast was watched by 506,000 viewers in the United States, a low number by premium cable network standards. But subsequent data from Showtime estimates that in the first three days after the premiere around 1.7 million viewers watched the episode, including 298,000 from DVR viewings and viewers from various streaming platforms. Although "Part 2" was not rated upon its Showtime broadcast, a TV-14 edit of the episode was uploaded on the official Twin Peaks YouTube channel for a brief period in June 2017 (on the occasion of National Doughnut Day); the same edit was uploaded again on August 8, 2017.

=== Critical reception ===
"Part 2" received critical acclaim. On Rotten Tomatoes, the episode received a 100% rating based on 13 reviews. The critics' consensus reads, "'Part Two' delivers all the addictively, terrifyingly inscrutable storytelling that Twin Peaks fans and David Lynch devotees could hope for." Writing for IndieWire, Liz Shannon Miller gave the episode a B+, expressing disappointment at the "pretty staggering" violence against women in both this episode and Part 1, especially Darya's death, "an excruciatingly painful sequence"; but she praised the show as "fascinating in our current era of revivals, because it eschews all the conventions used by other series". She called Kyle MacLachlan's performance "impressive", extending the praise to the rest of the cast in the light of the "insane" circumstances they worked under ("all actors were only given their own lines, and no knowledge of the full story"), and calling the premiere "plenty watchable" but adding that "there are a few elements that don't go down as easy as damn good coffee."

The New York Times' James Poniewozik gave the episode a positive review, calling Lynch's visual imagination "inimitable" and likening the episode to the glass box it features while also drawing comparisons to Lost, Fargo and True Detective. Poniewozik wrote, "[t]he original Twin Peaks was powered by two questions: 'Who killed Laura Palmer?' and 'What the hell am I watching?'", and that while "[t]he reincarnation doesn't have the first", "it still knows how to get you to ask the second". In his recap for Entertainment Weekly, Jeff Jensen gave Part 2 a B+, criticizing the episode's "absence of certain conventions that even that unconventional pilot possessed" while praising the episode's scope and Glass Box subplot, calling himself "engaged" by the series.

In her positive review of the episode, The A.V. Club's Emily L. Stephens gave the episode an A, writing that the "comfort" of the original Twin Peaks is "entirely eschewed", praising the Glass Box subplot as "a remark upon the creation and the consumption of television and film" and calling the episode an "unfiltered Lynchian vision, unfettered from the structures of soap operas, police procedurals, or thrillers that gave shape to the first few original outings into Twin Peaks."
