= Part 18 (Twin Peaks) =

- Twin Peaks episode
- Carrie Page (Sheryl Lee) screams upon hearing Sarah Palmer (Grace Zabriskie) calling the name Laura in the final scene of the series.
- Episode no.: Season 3 Episode 18
- Directed by: David Lynch
- Written by: David Lynch; Mark Frost
- Cinematography by: Peter Deming
- Editing by: Duwayne Dunham
- Original air date: September 3, 2017
- Running time: 57 minutes

Guest appearances
- Matt Battaglia as Cowboy 3; Laura Dern as Diane Evans; Francesca Eastwood as Texas Waitress Kristi; Pierce Gagnon as Sonny Jim Jones; Heath Hensley as Cowboy 1; Sheryl Lee as Laura Palmer and Carrie Page; Rob Mars as Cowboy 2; Mary Reber as Alice Tremond; Al Strobel as Phillip Michael Gerard / MIKE; Naomi Watts as Janey-E Jones; Ray Wise as Leland Palmer; Grace Zabriskie as Sarah Palmer

Episode chronology
← Previous "Part 17"	Next → —

"Part 18", also known as "What Is Your Name?", (Note: Episodes did not originally air with titles, but the promotional quotes for each episode were later used as titles in the Blu-ray release of this season) is the series finale of the American surrealist mystery horror drama television series Twin Peaks. It was written by Mark Frost and David Lynch, directed by Lynch, and stars Kyle MacLachlan. "Part 18" was broadcast on Showtime along with "Part 17" on September 3, 2017, and seen by an audience of 240,000 viewers in the United States. The episode was acclaimed by critics, although audiences were less enthusiastic, because of its slow pacing and ambiguity.

== Plot ==
What is your name?

— Dale Cooper (used as a promotional tagline for the episode)

=== Background ===
The small town of Twin Peaks, Washington, has been shocked by the murder of schoolgirl Laura Palmer (Sheryl Lee) and the attempted murder of her friend Ronette Pulaski (Phoebe Augustine). FBI special agent Dale Cooper (Kyle MacLachlan) has been sent to the town to investigate and has discovered that the killer was Laura's father, Leland Palmer (Ray Wise), who acted while possessed by a demonic entity, Killer BOB (Frank Silva). At the end of the original series, Cooper was trapped in the Black Lodge, an extra-dimensional place, by BOB, who let out Cooper's doppelgänger to use him as his physical access to the world.

Twenty-five years after those events, Cooper manages to escape the Lodge through a portal between worlds; during this process, Cooper was supposed to replace the doppelgänger, but instead he takes the place of a second doppelgänger, Dougie Jones, fabricated by the first as a decoy for the exchange. Cooper's doppelgänger, exhausted from the process, crashes his car and passes out, allowing the police to capture him; he subsequently manages to escape, dividing his time between his search for access to "the Zone" and organizing his minions' attempts to eliminate the now catatonic Cooper, whom Jones's family and colleagues take for the real Dougie. After numerous attempts, Cooper's doppelgänger finds the correct coordinates to access the zone; he is redirected towards the Twin Peaks Sheriff Station, where the real Cooper is also heading after awakening from his incapacitated state. Lucy Brennan (Kimmy Robertson), the station's secretary, shoots the doppelgänger; when BOB, in the form of an orb, tries to escape, he is punched to his destruction by Freddie Sykes (Jake Wardle), an English boy with a Lodge-powered gardening glove. One of the station's prisoners, Naido (Nae Yuuki), turns out to be Diane (Laura Dern), Cooper's assistant, trapped by Cooper's doppelgänger in a deformed body. Cooper then travels through time to the night Laura was killed, seeking to prevent her murder.

=== Events ===
In the Black Lodge, Cooper's doppelgänger burns. MIKE (Al Strobel) creates a new Dougie Jones, who rejoins his wife Janey-E (Naomi Watts) and his son Sonny Jim (Pierce Gagnon). Returning to the last scene of the previous episode, Cooper leads Laura through the woods of Twin Peaks, when she suddenly disappears with a scream. Cooper now sits in the Lodge, during a sequence similar to one shown before. MIKE asks: "Is it future or is it past?" The Evolution of The Arm asks "Is it the story of the girl who lived down the lane?" Cooper then leaves the lodge and is warmly greeted by Diane at Glastonbury Grove.

In the morning, Cooper and Diane drive 430 miles to a desert location next to a power line. Diane asks Cooper whether he still wants to take on this task. Cooper warns that once they cross "everything could be different." They drive through an apparent portal, which takes them to a deserted highway at night. When they reach a motel, Cooper checks in, while Diane briefly sees another version of herself leaving the motel. Diane and Cooper have sex in their room that night, but Diane is visibly distressed. The morning after, a perplexed Cooper wakes up in a different motel room to find Diane gone. He finds a letter signed by "Linda", addressing "Richard", saying that she is gone and asking him not to search for her. (Note: The number 430 and the names Richard and Linda were referenced by the Fireman in the opening scene of Part 1.) Cooper drives to Odessa, Texas; while driving, he finds a diner named "Judy's". There he stops three men in cowboy hats (Matt Battaglia, Heath Hensley and Rob Mars) from harassing a waitress, Kristi (Francesca Eastwood). Cooper asks Kristi whether another waitress works there, but is told that she has the day off. He gets her address.

Cooper drives to the home of the absent waitress (Sheryl Lee) who, despite looking like Laura, is confused when Cooper calls her Laura, and identifies herself as Carrie Page. When Cooper insists that she is Laura and offers to take her home to Twin Peaks, Carrie, already eager to leave Odessa, agrees to follow him.

As Carrie packs her things, Cooper looks around her residence and sees the body of a man dead from a gunshot wound on her couch, a white figurine of a horse, and an assault rifle on the floor. As they drive, Carrie begins talking about her life in Odessa, saying she tried to keep a clean and organized house.

When they arrive at Twin Peaks, they pass by the Double R Diner before parking in front of the Palmer house. Carrie does not recognize anything. Cooper knocks on the door, but a stranger (Mary Reber) answers. The woman identifies herself as Alice Tremond, and, after speaking to her unseen partner, tells them that they bought the house from a Mrs. Chalfont and that they do not know who the previous owner was or who Sarah Palmer is.

Cooper thanks her, and he and Carrie depart, both perplexed. Cooper hesitates and turns again toward the house. Walking mechanically, Cooper, confused, asks himself, "What year is this?" Carrie turns to look at the house and hears Sarah Palmer (Grace Zabriskie) calling out for "Laura". She suddenly screams in a similar fashion to Laura; at that moment, as Cooper turns and reacts in shock, all the lights in the house go out, and the screen goes dark.

The episode's final image is a brief flashback to an earlier moment in the Black Lodge, as Laura whispers something into a disturbed Cooper's ear. Unlike in a previous similar instance, her message is not revealed.

== Production ==
The writing credits for "Part 18", like the rest of the limited series, are Mark Frost and David Lynch and directed by Lynch. In 2025, former Twin Peaks screenwriter Harley Peyton said the "sweetly nostalgic" Part 17 was Frost's original ending for the series while Part 18 was Lynch's preferred conclusion. In the same interview, Frost said, "I would say that we both got our ending, and they actually work hand in hand."

=== Music ===
The Platters' song "My Prayer" is used during the sex scene between Diane and Cooper; the song had already been used during the closing scene of Part 8. One of the founding members of the group is a singer named David Lynch. The episode's credits are underscored by a piece by Angelo Badalamenti eventually released on the September 2017 soundtrack album Twin Peaks: Limited Event Series Original Soundtrack under the title "Dark Space Low."

== Reception ==
"Part 18" received critical acclaim. On Rotten Tomatoes, the episode received an 88% rating based on 24 reviews. The critics' consensus reads: "Dale Cooper dives into the rabbit hole and gets lost in there during a boldly dark conclusion that is bound to baffle and infuriate while proving to be unforgettable all the same."

Writing for IndieWire, Hanh Nguyen awarded the episode an A, calling the sex scene between Diane and Cooper "one of the most disturbing and fraught scenes in the series," and expressing the necessity to regard "this finale as a true ending to the Twin Peaks saga." She called the episode a "brilliant and no doubt controversial ending for a show that had come back after 25 years to leave fans wanting yet again." In her similarly positive review of the episode, The A.V. Club's Emily L. Stephens gave the episode an A−, writing that it smashes Part 17's "answers to pieces and poses more staggering questions", ultimately enforcing the "bitter, brutal truth that closure is a luxury, not a guarantee."

The New York Times' Noel Murray gave the episode a positive review, saying that he "personally loved" the episode and defining certain scenes as "pure televised poetry," while recognizing some validity to the fans' annoyance over its "elliptical nature". In his recap for Entertainment Weekly, Jeff Jensen favorably compared the episode and its predecessor to Lynch's Lost Highway, praising the series as a whole as Lynch's "do-over at a big saga fantasy, produced at a length and rich with the poetic abstraction that he couldn't get from a Hollywood feature film."
