= Episode 29 (Twin Peaks) =

- Twin Peaks episode
- The elderly waiter offering Dale Cooper coffee in the Black Lodge.
- Episode no.: Season 2 Episode 22
- Directed by: David Lynch
- Written by: Mark Frost; Harley Peyton; Robert Engels; David Lynch (uncredited)
- Production code: 2.022
- Original air date: June 10, 1991
- Running time: 50 minutes

Guest appearances
- Heather Graham as Annie Blackburn; Grace Zabriskie as Sarah Palmer; Wendy Robie as Nadine Hurley; Don Davis as Major Garland Briggs; Charlotte Stewart as Betty Briggs; Gary Hershberger as Mike Nelson; Mary Jo Deschanel as Eileen Hayward; Catherine E. Coulson as Margaret Lanterman / "The Log Lady"; James V. Scott as the Black Lodge performer; Ed Wright as Dell Mibbler; Dan O'Herlihy as Andrew Packard; Carel Struycken as The Giant; Hank Worden as The Elderly Room Service Waiter; Michael J. Anderson as The Man from Another Place; Frank Silva as Killer BOB; Phoebe Augustine as Ronette Pulaski; Jan D'Arcy as Sylvia Horne; Andrea Hays as Heidi

Episode chronology
← Previous "Episode 28"	Next → "The Return, Part 1"

"Episode 29", also known as "Beyond Life and Death", (Note: Although the series did not originally have episode titles, when it was broadcast in Germany, the episodes were given titles, which are now used by some fans and critics.) is the twenty-second and final episode of the second season of the American surrealist mystery horror drama television series Twin Peaks. Episode 29 served as the final episode of Twin Peaks for over 25 years, until Twin Peaks: The Return premiered on May 21, 2017. Upon its original airing in 1991, the episode was paired with the previous episode to form the second hour of what was then billed as a two-part series finale. The episode was written by the series co-creator Mark Frost, producer Harley Peyton and regular writer Robert Engels and was directed by series co-creator David Lynch, who rewrote parts of the script. It features series regulars Kyle MacLachlan, Michael Ontkean, Richard Beymer and Kenneth Welsh; and guest stars Frank Silva as Killer Bob, Michael J. Anderson as The Man from Another Place, Carel Struycken as The Giant, and Heather Graham as Annie Blackburn.

Twin Peaks centers on the investigation into the murder of schoolgirl Laura Palmer (Sheryl Lee) in the small rural town in Washington state after which the series is named. In this episode, after the kidnapping of Annie Blackburn, Federal Bureau of Investigation (FBI) Special Agent Dale Cooper (MacLachlan) and Sheriff Truman (Ontkean) pursue Windom Earle (Welsh) to a portal leading to The Black Lodge—a strange, frightening place which exists on an alternate plane of reality. Cooper enters, whereupon his courage is tested by The Man from Another Place, Earle, a number of doppelgängers, and Killer Bob.

"Episode 29" was broadcast on June 10, 1991, on the American Broadcasting Company (ABC) and was watched by an audience of 10.4 million households in the United States, about 12 percent of the available audience. The episode was initially met with mixed reception from critics and audiences alike, many of whom found its cliffhangers frustrating and noted many unanswered questions. It has been reevaluated more positively over time, with vast critical and academic commentary focusing on the episode’s unconventional narrative structure and surrealistic style. Several of the episode's cliffhangers were expanded upon in the 2016 tie-in book The Secret History of Twin Peaks, and also touched upon less directly in Lynch's 1992 movie Twin Peaks: Fire Walk With Me, in Twin Peaks: The Missing Pieces, and eventually in the 2017 revival.

== Plot ==
=== Background ===
The small town of Twin Peaks, Washington, has been shocked by the murder of schoolgirl Laura Palmer (Sheryl Lee) and the attempted murder of her friend Ronette Pulaski (Phoebe Augustine). Federal Bureau of Investigation (FBI) Special Agent Dale Cooper (Kyle MacLachlan) has been sent to the town to investigate, and has discovered the murderer, a demonic spirit named Killer BOB (Frank Silva), had possessed the body of Laura's father, Leland Palmer (Ray Wise). Cooper's departure from Twin Peaks is halted by the arrival of his former FBI partner, Windom Earle (Kenneth Welsh), who engages Cooper in a dangerous chess match. Earle's true goal is to use the power of the supernatural Black Lodge, whose entrance is somewhere in the woods surrounding Twin Peaks.

Annie Blackburn (Heather Graham), a former convent resident and sister of Norma Jennings (Peggy Lipton), arrives in Twin Peaks. Cooper falls in love with her, and convinces her to join the Miss Twin Peaks pageant. Meanwhile, Earle begins his plan, knowing the whereabouts of the Black Lodge's entrance. Concluding he requires fear to enter, he interrupts the Miss Twin Peaks pageant and kidnaps its winner, Annie. In the pandemonium, Nadine Hurley (Wendy Robie), a 35-year old woman believing herself to be an eighteen-year-old high school senior, sustains a head injury. Meanwhile, Deputy Sheriff Andy Brennan (Harry Goaz) discovers a map hidden in a cave marking.

High school student Donna Hayward (Lara Flynn Boyle) attempts to find connections between her mother, Eileen Hayward (Mary Jo Deschanel) and local businessman Benjamin Horne (Richard Beymer). Donna has found details of an affair between them, and has now learned that Benjamin is her biological father.

Sawmill owner Catherine Martell (Piper Laurie) discovers a puzzle box left by her brother's business enemy, Thomas Eckhardt (David Warner). Catherine and her brother Andrew Packard (Dan O'Herlihy) find a security deposit key inside the box.

=== Events ===
Sheriff Harry S. Truman (Michael Ontkean), Deputy Sheriff Hawk (Michael Horse), Andy, and Cooper stand in the sheriff's office, pondering on the disappearance of Earle and Annie. Local logger Pete Martell (Jack Nance) enters, telling the Sheriff that the Log Lady (Catherine E. Coulson) stole his car. Cooper concludes it was a disguised Earle escaping with Annie, and the real Log Lady enters, holding a jar of engine oil. Ronette Pulaski is brought in, and recognizes the oil's smell from the night of Laura's death. Meanwhile, Truman recalls a circle of twelve sycamore trees in the woods, which match up with the markings on the cave map.

Nadine recovers from her head injury with her senior boyfriend Mike Nelson (Gary Hershberger), estranged husband Ed Hurley (Everett McGill), doctor Doc Hayward (Warren Frost), and Norma. Nadine recovers her memory, and becomes horrified when she sees Ed and Norma together. She bursts into tears, abandoning Mike.

Windom arrives at the circle of sycamores, with Annie captive. A small pool of oil lies at the center of the trees; Annie becomes catatonic upon approaching it. A ghostly red curtain appears behind the pool. They pass through it and vanish. Cooper and Truman find Pete's car, and Cooper follows alone. Hearing an owl, Cooper finds the pool at the center of the sycamore trees, and sees red curtains appear. He goes through them, and the curtains disappear.

Now in the Black Lodge, Cooper passes through red-curtained hallways, finding himself in the Red Room. The Man from Another Place (Michael J. Anderson) dances into the room and sits in a velvet chair. A strobe light flickers as Jimmy Scott sings a jazz ballad. Outside the Black Lodge, Andy and Harry wait for Cooper.

At the Hayward house, Donna remains distraught. Ben and Donna's mother attempt to console her. Doctor Hayward arrives, enraged. He attacks Ben, knocking him unconscious. Meanwhile, Andrew steals the safe deposit box key. He is seen by Pete, who accompanies him to the bank.

Audrey Horne (Sherilyn Fenn) walks into the Twin Peaks bank and chains herself to the bank vault to protest a local housing development. Andrew and Pete arrive with the safe deposit key, and they open the box left by Thomas Eckhardt. The box is opened, revealing a bomb and a note from Eckhardt. The bomb explodes, blowing out the bank's windows.

At the Double R Diner, Bobby Briggs (Dana Ashbrook) proposes marriage to Shelly Johnson (Mädchen Amick). Nearby, Major Briggs receives a message from Sarah Palmer (Grace Zabriskie), Laura's mother, in a distorted and different voice: "I'm in the Black Lodge with Dale Cooper. I'm waiting for you."

In the Black Lodge, Cooper encounters mysterious figures. The Man from Another Place offers him coffee, and tells Cooper that "when you see me again, it won't be me." Cooper sees Laura Palmer, who tells him that she will see him again in 25 years. Laura holds a mysterious pose, then disappears. An elderly waiter from the Great Northern Hotel (Hank Worden) gives Cooper a coffee that changes consistency. The waiter is replaced by The Giant (Carel Struycken), who sits down and says, "One and the same." The Man from Another Place says, "Fire, walk with me." Cooper sees an explosion of flames, and the waiting room turns dark. He leaves the room, and passes through several more rooms. In one, he finds Maddy Ferguson (Lee), who says "Watch out for my cousin."

Cooper finds the Man from Another Place twitching and grimacing, saying "doppelgänger". A doppelgänger of Laura appears, holding the same pose as before. She shrieks and charges Cooper. Cooper briefly sees the face of Windom Earle over Laura's and flees. In a different room, Cooper finds a fresh stab wound in his stomach. He stumbles back to a new room, following a trail of his own blood, and sees Caroline, Earle's wife, lying on the floor beside his own bloodied body. He calls for her, and the woman turns into Annie. Annie sits up, covered in blood. Cooper calls out to her, but the room turns dark, and the bodies disappear.

Cooper walks into a room with a black marble table. Annie appears and tells Cooper that the man who killed her was her husband. Cooper is baffled. Annie turns into Caroline, and she turns into a doppelgänger of Laura. She shrieks and turns into Windom Earle. Windom tells Cooper he will let Annie live if Cooper gives him his soul. Cooper agrees without hesitation, and Windom stabs Cooper. The stabbing suddenly reverses, and Killer BOB appears, holding Earle like a puppet. BOB extracts Earle's soul, and Cooper leaves. A doppelgänger of Cooper enters the room and laughs with BOB.

A doppelgänger of Leland Palmer appears in the hall and says to Cooper, "I did not kill anybody." Meanwhile, doppelgänger Cooper comes into the hall and snickers with Leland, then chases Cooper. Cooper flees but is caught by his doppelgänger just before he can escape.

It is nightfall again. The gateway to the Black Lodge glows for a moment and disappears. Harry finds Cooper and Annie lying in the circle of trees.

Cooper wakes the next morning at the Great Northern, with Harry and Doc Hayward watching over him. Cooper asks, "How's Annie?" Harry replies that Annie will recover. Cooper gets up out of bed, announcing he needs to brush his teeth. In the bathroom, Cooper lunges his head towards the mirror, with BOB looking back, revealing it was Cooper's doppelgänger that arrived from the Black Lodge. As Truman and Hayward begin to worry, Cooper's doppelgänger menacingly smiles and mockingly repeats, "How's Annie?"

== Production ==
The officially credited writers for this episode are Mark Frost, Harley Peyton, and Robert Engels. However, David Lynch revised their script significantly sans credit; he maintained the episode's general structure but altered much of the dialogue and many scenes, most notably in the Red Room/Black Lodge sequences, making them more akin to the dream sequences in the first season. Lynch also expanded the cast, adding characters that were not in the original script like The Log Lady and some that had not been seen in the series for some time, including Maddy Ferguson, the Palmer family, Ronette Pulaski, and Heidi the waitress, meaning Ray Wise, Grace Zabriskie, Sheryl Lee, Phoebe Augustine, Andrea Hays and more return.

James Marshall, Joan Chen, and Piper Laurie do not appear in this episode.

In an interview with Chris Rodley, Lynch said that the last episode "was written, but when it came to the Red Room, it was, in my opinion, completely and totally wrong. Completely and totally wrong. And so I changed that part. A lot of the other parts were things that had been started and were on a certain route, so they had to continue. But you can still direct them in a certain way. But I really like that last episode."

Twin Peaks production coordinator Sabrina S. Sutherland recalled,

That’s the only time David ever really got mad at me on that second season. It was the last episode, which he directed, and he did not like the script that had been written. He came to me, and he was screaming at me: “Did this script go out to everybody?” Because my job was distributing the scripts. And I said: “Yes.” And he was so upset. So he rewrote it and took out stuff that he didn’t like, and made new scenes to make it more like his and Mark’s original vision of Twin Peaks. He was very, very upset, screaming at me. And then he was like: “OK, I know it’s not your fault, and you thought you were doing the right thing.”"

Harley Peyton, who co-wrote the original script with Mark Frost and Robert Engels, recalled,

We originally wrote the finale together. Then word started trickling back that David was going on a David Walkabout and making some changes. I reacted with ire and outrage -- until I saw the episode. Then I was just in awe. Now that doesn't always work, and David some times had difficulty with the linear nature of episodic storytelling. But that finale was one of the best hours of TV I've ever seen.

The major differences between the episode as originally scripted and as actually filmed are as follows:

- The Log Lady and Ronette Pulaski, both of whom appear in the actual episode, do not appear in the original script.
- The confrontation between Benjamin Horne and the Haywards is generally the same, although there is more dialogue in the original script. Also, in the original script, Doc Hayward shoves Ben, who strikes his head against a coffee table; a distraught Doc Hayward rushes to Ben's aid, asks Donna to fetch his medical bag, and apologises to Ben. In the filmed episode, Doc Hayward punches Ben, who splits his head against the fireplace; Doc Hayward reacts with terror and does not rush to Ben's aid.
- In the original script, Hawk and Major Briggs find Leo Johnson in Windom Earle's cabin. Leo instinctively begins to speak when he sees them, setting off the spider-trap set by Earle. Lynch replaced this with the scene in the Double R Diner featuring Bobby, Shelly, Major Briggs, Mrs Briggs, Dr Jacoby, Sarah Palmer, and Heidi the German waitress. With the exception of Major Briggs, none of these characters appear in the original script. In the filmed episode, Leo is only seen very briefly, via footage from the previous episode; his ultimate fate is left unresolved.
- In the original script, Pete Martell does not accompany Andrew Packard into the bank. Instead, Catherine Martell rushes into the bank just before Andrew accidentally sets off the bomb. Catherine does not appear at all in the filmed episode, and in the original script, Pete's only appearance is in the Sheriff's station at the beginning of the episode.
- In the original script, Sheriff Truman sees a vision of a dark woman wearing chain mail, holding a sword and a shield.
- The sequences in the Black Lodge are almost totally different in the original script: a ghostly version of The Great Northern appears; Windom Earle has much more dialogue and sings a musical number; there is no backwards-talking; Laura Palmer appears only for an instant (trying to save Cooper from Bob) and does not speak; The Black Lodge Singer, The Man from Another Place, the Giant, the Elderly Bellhop, Maddy Ferguson, and Leland Palmer do not appear. Windom Earle's fate is less abrupt - he ends up shackled to a dentist's chair with Bob as the torturer.
- The revelation at episode's end that Cooper has been replaced by a Bob-inhabited doppelgänger is more subtle in the original script. Given its absence of doppelgangers, the script ends with the implication Cooper himself is inhabited by Bob - in the bathroom scene, Cooper squeezes toothpaste onto his toothbrush, looks to the mirror and smiles, with Bob's reflection smiling back, and the script ends at this point. In the filmed episode, it is more obvious that the real Cooper is trapped in the Black Lodge and it is Cooper's evil doppelganger who has escaped to Twin Peaks. The episode ends when Cooper's doppelganger squeezes the toothpaste into the sink, sees Bob's reflection in the mirror, smashes his head into the mirror, says "How’s Annie?" repeatedly, and laughs uncontrollably.

== Twin Peaks: Fire Walk with Me and The Missing Pieces ==
Although David Lynch's 1992 film Twin Peaks: Fire Walk with Me is largely a prequel set before the events of the television series, some elements of the film are a linear continuation of the series' final episode, including sequences of Dale Cooper in the Black Lodge. In another cryptic scene, Laura Palmer sees in her bedroom a vision of a bloodied Annie Blackburn who says, "My name is Annie. I've been with Laura and Dale. The good Dale is in the Lodge and he can't leave. Write it in your diary." Footage filmed for Fire Walk with Me but deleted from the film were later released in 2014 as the compilation film Twin Peaks: The Missing Pieces and include scenes which pick up after the end of the series. These scenes include Annie being rushed to hospital after her exit from the Black Lodge; Annie in hospital, reciting the words Laura (in the past) heard in her vision (as seen in Fire Walk with Me); and an extension of the final scene of the series, depicting Truman and Doc Hayward coming to Cooper's aid in the bathroom, with Cooper's doppelganger telling Truman, "I slipped and hit my head on the mirror. The glass broke as it struck my head. It struck me as funny, Harry. Do you understand me, Harry, it struck me as funny!"

Although Lynch planned to make a trilogy of Twin Peaks films after the conclusion of the television series, the financial and critical failure of Fire Walk with Me rendered the franchise inactive until 2015, when Lynch and Mark Frost commenced production of the limited television series Twin Peaks: The Return (2017).

== The Secret History of Twin Peaks ==
Mark Frost's 2016 tie-in book for the 2017 relaunch of the series elaborates on some of the events that transpire in "Beyond Life and Death." The book takes the form of a dossier that has been compiled by an initially unidentified former resident of Twin Peaks. It is revealed in The Secret History of Twin Peaks that Audrey Horne survived the bomb blast at the bank, but that both Pete Martell and Andrew Packard died. We also learn that Benjamin Horne survived his run in with Doc Hayward and later purchased all of Catherine Martell's land in Twin Peaks retaining his stranglehold on the town. Catherine later became a recluse.

Agent Cooper's fate is elaborated on slightly when it is revealed that the dossier was compiled by Major Garland Briggs, who, after the immediate events of the finale, discovered that Cooper was the "key" to unlocking the mystery of Project Blue Book and the Black Lodge. Upon hearing that Cooper was resting at the Great Northern following his experience in the Lodge, Briggs requested that Cooper join him at his house to discuss his experiences. Later that evening Cooper joined Briggs at the family house, but what happened at the house is not specified. Major Briggs's final entry in the dossier states that Cooper left the house later that evening and that Briggs realized that something was wrong with him; he then writes that he realized what he had to do and signed off with the message "M*A*Y*D*A*Y". It is here that the dossier ends.

== Twin Peaks: The Final Dossier ==
Mark Frost's 2017 tie-in book reveals further information about the fates of the Twin Peaks characters, including the revelation that Annie Blackburn remained catatonic but every year, on the anniversary of her kidnapping, at exactly 8:38 in the morning, she would only say "I'm fine" (her response to the question "How's Annie?" that ended the original television series).

== Sources ==
- Riches, Simon (2011). "Intuition and Investigation into Another Place: The Epistemological Role of Dreaming in Twin Peaks and Beyond". In Devlin, William J.; Biderman, Shai (eds.). The Philosophy of David Lynch. Lexington: University Press of Kentucky. ISBN 978-0-8131-3396-6.
