= Twin Peaks season 3 =

2017 season of television series

Twin Peaks
- Season 3
- Promotional poster featuring Kyle MacLachlan as Dale Cooper
- Starring: Kyle MacLachlan
- No. of episodes: 18

Release
- Original network: Showtime
- Original release: May 21 – September 3, 2017

Season chronology
- ← Previous; Season 2

The third and final season of the surrealist mystery horror drama television series Twin Peaks, billed as Twin Peaks: The Return and Twin Peaks: A Limited Event Series, premiered on May 21, 2017, and concluded on September 3, 2017. The 18-episode season was broadcast in the United States on Showtime. It marked the Twin Peaks franchise's return to television after an absence of over 25 years, and continued storylines from the first two seasons (1990–1991) and their part-prequel, part-sequel theatrical film, Twin Peaks: Fire Walk with Me (1992). The show's co-creators David Lynch and Mark Frost returned to write the third season, with Lynch directing every episode.

Set 25 years after the events of the original Twin Peaks, the season follows multiple storylines, most of which are linked to FBI agent Dale Cooper (Kyle MacLachlan) and his 1989 investigation into the murder of high school student Laura Palmer (Sheryl Lee). In addition to the fictional Washington state town of Twin Peaks, the story extends to locations such as New York City, Las Vegas, South Dakota, New Mexico, and Texas. Showtime president David Nevins said the story's central focus was "Cooper's odyssey back to Twin Peaks".

The series garnered critical acclaim, with praise for its unconventional narrative structure, visual invention, and performances. Critics have hailed the show as the best television program of 2017 and the 2010s, as well as one of the best series of the 21st century. Some critics also consider The Return a film, with film journal Cahiers du Cinéma naming it the best film of the decade and the 2022 Sight & Sound critics' poll voting it the 152nd-greatest film in history.

== Synopsis ==
Season 3 picks up from Season 2's cliffhanger ending, when FBI agent Dale Cooper (Kyle MacLachlan) was trapped in the Black Lodge and his doppelgänger—host to the evil spirit Bob—assumed his identity in the natural world. 25 years later, Cooper struggles to recover his past while coming into contact with the Las Vegas criminal underworld. Meanwhile, his doppelgänger works with criminal associates to prevent his own return to the Lodge. In South Dakota, the mysterious death of a local librarian studying paranormal phenomena sparks an investigation by Cooper's old friends at the FBI. In Twin Peaks, a new clue leads members of the sheriff's office to reopen their inquiry into the 1989 murder of Laura Palmer (Sheryl Lee) while its residents contend with the continuing fallout of her death.

== Production ==
=== Background and development ===
The first season of Twin Peaks premiered on April 8, 1990, on ABC. It was one of the top-rated series of 1990, although its ratings declined in the second season. In subsequent years, Twin Peaks has often been listed among the greatest television dramas of all time. Aaron Spelling Productions wanted to continue the series for a third season, but ABC canceled it because of declining ratings and high production costs. A prequel film, Twin Peaks: Fire Walk with Me, was released in 1992, but received negative reviews and a poor commercial performance, leading to the cancellation of the other two films in the series. Lynch and Frost tried to develop a spin-off series centered around Audrey Horne, but the pilot episode evolved into the unrelated theatrical film Mulholland Drive. In 2001, Lynch said that Twin Peaks was as "dead as a doornail".

In 2007, artist Matt Haley began work on a graphic novel continuation, which he hoped would be included in the "Complete Mystery" DVD box set. Twin Peaks producer Robert Engels agreed to help write it on the condition that Lynch and Frost approved the project; Haley said: "[Engels] and I had a number of discussions about what the story would be. I was keen to use whatever notes they had for the proposed third season. I really wanted this to be a literal 'third season' of the show." Paramount Home Entertainment agreed to package it with the box set, also on the condition that Lynch and Frost approved. Though Frost approved the project, Lynch vetoed it, saying that he respected the effort but did not want to continue the story of Twin Peaks.

In or around 2012, Lynch and Frost met at Musso & Frank Grill in Los Angeles to discuss a potential third season. They did so in part because, in the final episode of season two, Laura tells Cooper that she will see him in 25 years, and "the show's baked-in time jump was approaching". Lynch's then-wife Emily Stofle recalled that, starting in 2012, the two men began secretly meeting in Lynch's home studio to write the script, which "went on for many years"; as their ideas developed, they shifted to writing the script over Skype. Lynch and Frost also privately reached out to Kyle MacLachlan in 2012 to make sure he would be interested in the project.

Lynch and Frost did not write a traditional script with clear divisions between episodes. Instead, they wrote a 500-page plot document. They completed the "script" in January 2015, and asked Showtime executives to review it over the weekend. They did not pitch the script to any other networks. After the script was complete, Frost left to write a tie-in novel, The Secret History of Twin Peaks. Lynch "expanded the story substantially" after Frost's departure.

Due to the project's secrecy, Frost and Jennifer Lynch both publicly denied rumors that the show would return. On the other hand, Ray Wise said Lynch told him that a third season was possible, and that he might even be able to "work around" the death of Wise's character, Leland Palmer. In September 2014, shortly before Season 3 was announced, Lynch said the future of Twin Peaks was a "tricky question" and "you just have to wait and see".

=== Announcement and budget negotiations ===
On October 6, 2014, Showtime announced that it would air a nine-episode miniseries written by Lynch and Frost and directed by Lynch. Frost emphasized that the new episodes would be a continuation of the series, not a remake or reboot. The episodes were to be set in the present day, and the passage of 25 years would be an important element in the plot. Showtime's advertising dubbed the third season Twin Peaks: The Return, over Lynch and Frost's objections. Frost also left open the possibility of future seasons.

In mid-2015, Lynch and Showtime began locking horns over the show's budget. In a 2018 book co-authored by Lynch, Kristine McKenna wrote that Showtime (which was budgeting for the show on a per-episode basis) was concerned that Lynch did not like the original nine-episode plan, but would not tell Showtime how many episodes he needed to tell the story. That April, Lynch announced he would not direct the third season due to budget constraints. Days later, a video was released in which several Twin Peaks cast members, including Sheryl Lee, Dana Ashbrook, and Sherilyn Fenn, urged that Lynch be kept on board for the revival. The dispute was resolved in May; Showtime's David Nevins said that he compromised with Lynch by giving him a fixed budget for the entire season with no constraints on the episode count. One week after the announcement, Fenn and Lee announced that there would be 18 episodes, but Nevins maintained that the episode count was "open-ended" and that "we'll have [Lynch] cut [the footage] into however many episodes it feels best at". After the show aired, Lynch thanked Nevins for "ma[king] Twin Peaks: The Return happen", saying, "maybe somebody else wouldn't have done that".

=== Casting ===
On January 12, 2015, Kyle MacLachlan was confirmed to return to the series. In October 2015, it was confirmed that Michael Ontkean, who portrayed Sheriff Harry S. Truman and had since retired from acting, would not return for the revival, and that the role of town sheriff would be filled by Robert Forster, later confirmed as playing Frank Truman, brother of Harry. Forster had been cast as Harry in the 1990 pilot but was replaced by Ontkean due to scheduling issues. Also in October, David Duchovny teased his return as Agent Denise Bryson. In November 2015, it was reported that Miguel Ferrer would reprise his role as Albert Rosenfield, and that Richard Beymer and David Patrick Kelly would return as Benjamin Horne and Jerry Horne, respectively. In December 2015, Alicia Witt confirmed she would reprise her role as Gersten Hayward. Michael J. Anderson was asked to reprise his role as The Man from Another Place, but declined.

Russ Tamblyn underwent open-heart surgery in late 2014, and was still recovering in 2015. Lynch and Frost still hoped Tamblyn would join the cast for the new season, which was later confirmed. On September 28, 2015, Catherine E. Coulson, who reprised her role of the Log Lady in the new season, died of cancer. She filmed her final scene four days before her death.

The season's first teaser trailer, released in December 2015, confirmed the involvement of Michael Horse (Tommy "Hawk" Hill). In January 2016, it was reported that Sherilyn Fenn would reprise her role as Audrey Horne in a "major presence". In February 2016, it was reported that Lynch would reprise his role as Gordon Cole. Frequent Lynch collaborator Laura Dern was cast in a "top-secret pivotal role", which eventually proved to be Diane, the previously unseen character to whom Cooper frequently dictated taped messages during the show's original run. In April 2016, a complete cast list was released, featuring 217 actors, with actors returning from the earlier series marked with asterisks. Mary Reber, who plays Alice Tremond in the finale, is the actual owner of the house used for the Palmer residence.

Peter Sarsgaard and Paul Giamatti were initially cast, with Giamatti in the role of one of the Mitchum brothers, but both dropped out before production began. Justin Theroux was offered a role in the series, but due to a miscommunication, did not receive the offer.

David Bowie was asked to make a cameo appearance as FBI Agent Phillip Jeffries, his character from Twin Peaks: Fire Walk with Me. As Bowie's health was declining, his lawyer told Lynch that he was unavailable. Before his death in January 2016, Bowie gave the production permission to reuse old footage featuring him, but he was unhappy with the accent he had used in the film, and requested that he be dubbed over by an authentic Louisiana actor, leading to the casting of Nathan Frizzell as Jeffries's voice. In January and February 2017, respectively, cast members Miguel Ferrer and Warren Frost died, but both appear in the new season. This was Ferrer's last live action television role before his death. Harry Dean Stanton, who reprised his role as Carl Rodd, died in September 2017, less than two weeks after the last episode of the season aired.

=== Filming ===
Principal photography began in September 2015 and took 140 days. Filming was completed by April 2016. The season was shot continuously from a single, long shooting script before being edited into episodes. A 3.2K digital camera, the Arri Amira, was used because it was the smallest camera to shoot in 4K resolution, with 1960 ultra speed lenses from Panavision, to soften some of the digital image's sharpness.

In July 2015, Frost suggested that the season would premiere in 2017 rather than 2016, as originally planned. In January 2016, Nevins confirmed that the season would premiere in the first half of 2017.

=== Music ===
The season's score contains new and reused compositions by Angelo Badalamenti, dark ambient music and sound design by Dean Hurley and David Lynch (including some from The Air Is on Fire), and unreleased music from Lynch and Badalamenti's 1990s project Thought Gang, two of which previously appeared in Fire Walk with Me. Hurley's contributions were released on the album Anthology Resource Vol. 1: △△ on August 6, 2017, by Sacred Bones Records. Several tracks from Johnny Jewel's album Windswept also appear throughout. Threnody for the Victims of Hiroshima by Krzysztof Penderecki appears in key scenes.

Angelo Badalamenti's score was released on September 8, 2017, by Rhino Records as Twin Peaks: Limited Event Series Original Soundtrack.

Additionally, multiple episodes contain musical performances at the Roadhouse. Lynch hand-picked several of the bands and musicians, including Nine Inch Nails, Sharon Van Etten, Chromatics and Eddie Vedder. The final musical performance at the Roadhouse was by Julee Cruise, who sang the original series's theme. Twin Peaks: Music from the Limited Event Series, an album containing many of these performances, along with other songs heard on the season, was released by Rhino Records on September 8, 2017.

Episode	Artist	Song
Part 2	Chromatics (Ruth Radelet, Adam Miller, Johnny Jewel and Nat Walker)	"Shadow"
Part 3	The Cactus Blossoms (Jack Torrey, Page Burkum, Joel Paterson, Beau Sample and Alex Hall)	"Mississippi"
Part 4	Au Revoir Simone (Heather D'Angelo, Erika Forster and Annie Hart)	"Lark"
Part 5	Trouble (Riley Lynch, Alex Zhang Hungtai, Sam Smith, and Dean Hurley)	"Snake Eyes"
Part 6	Sharon Van Etten, with Carolyn Pennypacker Riggs, John Phillip Irons III, and Zeke Hutchins	"Tarifa"
Part 8	The Nine Inch Nails (Trent Reznor, Atticus Ross, Mariqueen Maandig, Robin Finck, Alessandro Cortini, and Joey Castillo)	"She's Gone Away"
Part 9	Au Revoir Simone (Heather D'Angelo, Erika Forster, and Annie Hart)	"A Violent Yet Flammable World"
Part 9	Hudson Mohawke	"Human"
Part 10	Rebekah Del Rio with Moby	"No Stars"
Part 12	Chromatics (Ruth Radelet, Adam Miller, Johnny Jewel and Nat Walker)	"Saturday" (Instrumental cover of Desire song)
Part 13	James Marshall (as James Hurley)	"Just You"
Part 14	Lissie, with Eric Sullivan, Lewis Keller and Jesse Siebenberg	"Wild West"
Part 15	The Veils (Finn Andrews, Sophia Burn and Uberto Rapisardi)	"Axolotl"
Part 16	Eddie Vedder (introduced as Edward Louis Severson III)	"Out of Sand"
Part 17	Julee Cruise, with Chromatics	"The World Spins"

Other music, mostly played diegetically, includes:

- "American Woman" (David Lynch Remix) by Muddy Magnolias
- "Take Five" by Dave Brubeck
- "I Love How You Love Me" by The Paris Sisters
- "I Am (Old School Hip Hop Beat)" by Blunted Beatz
- "Habit" and "Tabloid" by Uniform
- "Sleep Walk" by Santo & Johnny
- "Green Onions" by Booker T. & the M.G.'s
- "My Prayer" by The Platters
- "Charmaine" by Mantovani
- "Viva Las Vegas" by Shawn Colvin
- "I've Been Loving You Too Long" (Live) by Otis Redding
- "Sharp Dressed Man" by ZZ Top
- "Windswept", "Slow Dreams", "The Flame" by Johnny Jewel

Beethoven's Moonlight Sonata and "Last Call" by David Lynch are played slowed down significantly.

== Cast ==
- Kyle MacLachlan as Special Agent Dale Cooper and his various doppelgängers and alter egos, most prominently the doppelgänger created in the final episode of the second season (known in commentary as "Mr. C") and Dougie Jones

=== Twin Peaks ===
- Jay Aaseng as Drunk
- Mädchen Amick as Shelly Briggs
- Dana Ashbrook as Deputy Sheriff Bobby Briggs
- Phoebe Augustine as Ronette Pulaski (Note: Archive footage only)
- Richard Beymer as Benjamin Horne
- Gia Carides as Hannah
- Vincent Castellanos as Federico
- Michael Cera as Wally "Brando" Brennan
- Joan Chen as Josie Packard
- Candy Clark as Doris Truman
- Scott Coffey as Trick
- Catherine E. Coulson (Note: These actors died before the season aired and episodes are dedicated to their memory.) as Margaret Lanterman / "The Log Lady"
- Grace Victoria Cox as Charlotte
- Jan D'Arcy as Sylvia Horne
- Eric Da Re as Leo Johnson
- Ana de la Reguera as Natalie
- Hugh Dillon as Tom Paige
- Eamon Farren as Richard Horne
- Sherilyn Fenn as Audrey Horne
- Sky Ferreira as Ella
- Robert Forster as Sheriff Frank Truman
- Mark Frost as Cyril Pons
- Warren Frost as Dr. Will Hayward
- Balthazar Getty as Red
- Harry Goaz as Deputy Sheriff Andy Brennan
- Grant Goodeve as Walter Lawford
- Andrea Hays as Heidi
- Gary Hershberger as Mike Nelson
- Michael Horse as Deputy Chief Tommy "Hawk" Hill
- Caleb Landry Jones as Steven Burnett
- Ashley Judd as Beverly Paige
- David Patrick Kelly as Jerry Horne
- Piper Laurie as Catherine Martell
- Jane Levy as Elizabeth
- Peggy Lipton as Norma Jennings
- Sarah Jean Long as Miriam Sullivan
- Riley Lynch as Bing
- James Marshall as James Hurley
- Everett McGill as Ed Hurley
- Clark Middleton as Charlie
- Lo Mutuc (Note: Credited as Charlyne Yi) as Ruby
- Jack Nance as Pete Martell
- Walter Olkewicz as Jacques Renault and Jean-Michel Renault
- John Pirruccello as Deputy Sheriff Chad Broxford
- Mary Reber as Alice Tremond
- Kimmy Robertson as Lucy Brennan
- Wendy Robie as Nadine Hurley
- Erik Rondell as Johnny Horne
- Marvin "Marv" Rosand as Toad
- Rod Rowland as Chuck
- Amanda Seyfried as Rebecca 'Becky' Burnett
- Harry Dean Stanton as Carl Rodd
- JR Starr as MC
- Charlotte Stewart as Betty Briggs
- Jessica Szohr as Renee
- Russ Tamblyn as Dr. Lawrence Jacoby
- Jodi Thelen as Maggie
- Lauren Tewes as Gersten's neighbor
- Jake Wardle as Freddie Sykes
- Alicia Witt as Gersten Hayward
- Karolina Wydra as Chloe
- Grace Zabriskie as Sarah Palmer

=== Government ===
- Chrysta Bell as Special Agent Tammy Preston
- Richard Chamberlain as Bill Kennedy
- Laura Dern as Diane Evans
- David Duchovny as FBI Chief of Staff Denise Bryson
- Jay R. Ferguson as Special Agent Randall Headley
- Miguel Ferrer as Special Agent Albert Rosenfield
- Ernie Hudson as Colonel Davis
- David Lynch as FBI Deputy Director Gordon Cole
- Adele René as Lieutenant Cynthia Knox
- Owain Rhys Davies as Agent Wilson

=== Las Vegas ===
- Alon Aboutboul as Head Mover
- Joe Adler as Roger
- Stephanie Allynne as Soccer Mom
- Tammie Baird as Lorraine
- Jim Belushi as Bradley Mitchum
- John Billingsley as Doctor Ben
- Ronnie Gene Blevins as Tommy
- Wes Brown as Darren
- Juan Carlos Cantu as Officer Reynaldo
- Larry Clarke as Detective T. Fusco
- Jonny Coyne as Polish Accountant
- Giselle Damier as Sandie
- David Dastmalchian as Pit Boss Warrick
- Jeremy Davies as Jimmy
- Eric Edelstein as Detective "Smiley" Fusco
- John Ennis as Slot Machine Man
- Josh Fadem as Phil Bisby
- Rebecca Field as Another Mom
- Patrick Fischler as Duncan Todd
- Meg Foster as Cashier
- Pierce Gagnon as Sonny Jim Jones
- Hailey Gates as Drugged-out Mother
- Brett Gelman as Supervisor Burns
- Ivy George as 5-Year-Old Girl
- Robert Knepper as Rodney Mitchum
- David Koechner as Detective D. Fusco
- Virginia Kull as Syzmon Waitress
- Jay Larson as Limo Driver
- Andrea Leal as Mandie
- Bellina Logan as Female Doctor (Note: In the original series, Logan portrayed Louie "Birdsong" Budway.)
- Josh McDermitt as Wise Guy
- Don Murray as Bushnell Mullins
- Sara Paxton as Candy Shaker
- Linda Porter as Lady Slot-Addict
- Elena Satine as Rhonda
- John Savage as Detective Clark
- Amy Shiels as Candie
- Tom Sizemore as Anthony Sinclair
- Bob Stephenson as Frank
- Ethan Suplee as Bill Shaker
- Sabrina S. Sutherland as Floor Attendant Jackie
- Naomi Watts as Janey-E Jones
- Nafessa Williams as Jade
- Christophe Zajac-Denek as Ike "The Spike" Stadtler

=== South Dakota ===
- Jane Adams as Constance Talbot
- Brent Briscoe as Detective Dave Macklay
- Bailey Chase as Detective Don Harrison
- Neil Dickson as George Bautzer
- George Griffith as Ray Monroe
- Cornelia Guest as Phyllis Hastings
- Nicole LaLiberte as Darya
- Jennifer Jason Leigh as Chantal Hutchens
- Matthew Lillard as William Hastings
- Karl Makinen as Inspector Randy Hollister
- Bérénice Marlohe as French Woman
- James Morrison as Warden Dwight Murphy
- Christopher Murray as Officer Olson
- Max Perlich as Hank
- Tim Roth as Gary "Hutch" Hutchens
- Mary Stofle as Ruth Davenport

=== Supernatural ===
- Phoebe Augustine as American Girl
- Monica Bellucci as herself
- David Bowie as Phillip Jeffries
  - Nathan Frizzell as the voice of Phillip Jeffries
- Robert Broski as Woodsman
- Don S. Davis as Major Garland Briggs
- Erica Eynon as Experiment
- Sheryl Lee as Laura Palmer
- Joy Nash as Señorita Dido
- Carlton Lee Russell as the Jumping Man
- Frank Silva as Killer BOB
- Malachy Sreenan as Bosomy Lady
- Al Strobel as Phillip Michael Gerard / MIKE
- Carel Struycken as The Fireman (Note: The character's name is not revealed until Part 14. Struycken was credited as "The Giant" in the original series.)
- Ray Wise as Leland Palmer
- Nae Yuuki as Naido

Michael J. Anderson did not reprise his role as The Man from Another Place, who instead appears as a treelike computer-generated effect, and is voiced by an uncredited actor. When asked who provided the voice for the CGI character, executive producer Sabrina Sutherland replied: "Unfortunately, I think this question should remain a mystery and not be answered."

=== Other ===
==== New York ====
- Michael Bisping as Guard
- Benjamin Rosenfield as Sam Colby
- Madeline Zima as Tracey Barberato

==== Philadelphia ====
- Jesse Johnson as Younger Man

==== New Mexico, 1956 ====
- Leslie Berger as New Mexico Wife
- Cullen Douglas as Disc Jockey
- Tikaeni Faircrest as Girl (Note: Mark Frost's novel Twin Peaks: The Final Dossier reveals that this girl is a young Sarah Palmer.)
- Tad Griffith as New Mexico Husband
- Xolo Maridueña as Boy
- Tracy Philips as Receptionist

==== Montana ====
- Frank Collison as Muddy
- Derek Mears as Renzo

==== Odessa ====
- Matt Battaglia as Cowboy 3
- Francesca Eastwood as Texas Waitress Kristi
- Heath Hensley as Cowboy 1
- Rob Mars as Cowboy 2
- Sheryl Lee as Carrie Page

== Episodes ==
No. overall	No. in season	Title	Directed by	Written by	Original release date	U.S. viewers (millions)
31	1	"Part 1" "My Log Has a Message for You"	David Lynch	Mark Frost & David Lynch	May 21, 2017	0.506
In 2014, 25 years after the events of the previous season, FBI agent Dale Cooper remains trapped in the Black Lodge. The Fireman (formerly The Giant) tells him to remember "430" and "Richard and Linda". In Twin Peaks, Dr. Jacoby receives a shipment of shovels at his trailer home. Great Northern hotel owner Ben Horne introduces his brother Jerry to his new secretary, Beverly. Deputy Chief Hawk receives a phone call from the cancer-stricken Log Lady, who tells him evidence relating to Dale Cooper is missing. In a New York City penthouse, a young man named Sam is employed to observe a glass box. When the security guard is absent, Sam and a young woman, Tracey, have sex. An androgynous entity, the Experiment, materializes in the box and brutally murders both of them. In Buckhorn, South Dakota, Cooper's doppelgänger – a sinister, long-haired man with black irises – retrieves two associates, Ray and Darya. In a middle-income apartment project, the police find the severed head of Buckhorn librarian Ruth Davenport placed on the headless corpse of a John Doe. Local school principal Bill Hastings's fingerprints are found and he is arrested. Hastings denies guilt, but fumbles his alibi.
32	2	"Part 2" "The Stars Turn and a Time Presents Itself"	David Lynch	Mark Frost & David Lynch	May 21, 2017	0.506
Bill Hastings's wife visits him in jail and is later murdered in her home by Cooper's doppelgänger, so she will not implicate him in the murder that she hired him to commit, to frame Bill for his infidelity. In Las Vegas, businessman Duncan Todd sends money to an unseen woman for a future job. Cooper's doppelgänger employs Darya, Ray, and Jack to obtain information. Perceiving that Jack and Darya have turned on him, he murders them. He has a plan to avoid his due return to the Black Lodge and has a telephone conversation with someone he believes is missing FBI agent Phillip Jeffries, who mentions Major Briggs and BOB, the evil spirit inside the doppelgänger. The Cooper doppelgänger sets out for the South Dakota prison where Ray is imprisoned. Hawk approaches the entrance to the Black Lodge near Twin Peaks. Inside the Black Lodge, Cooper encounters the one-armed spirit MIKE and murdered schoolgirl Laura Palmer, who opens her face, revealing light. The Arm, who has evolved into a skeletal tree, says Cooper's doppelgänger must return before Cooper can leave. The Arm's doppelgänger attacks Cooper and he falls into the glass box in New York City (at the same time as Sam welcomes Tracey), then into space. At the Roadhouse in Twin Peaks, Shelly flirts with Red while her friend Renee notices James Hurley staring at her.
33	3	"Part 3" "Call for Help"	David Lynch	Mark Frost & David Lynch	May 28, 2017 (Note: Parts 3 and 4 were made available immediately after the premiere of parts 1 and 2 through Showtime's digital platform.)	0.195
Cooper lands in a building above a purple-colored sea, where he is protected from an unseen threat by two women, one of them eyeless. The eyeless woman, Naido, pulls a lever and falls into space. Cooper leaves through a portal. Cooper's doppelgänger and a second, "manufactured" doppelgänger, Dougie Jones, become sick and see the Black Lodge's red curtains. The first doppelgänger crashes his car and is apprehended by the police. Dougie is drawn into the Black Lodge, where he dissolves into a golden seed. Free from the Black Lodge, but having lost his entire memory, Cooper takes Dougie's place in Las Vegas, where Jade, a prostitute, finds him in a disoriented state inside a vacant house and drops him off at a casino. Jade also finds Cooper's old room key for the Great Northern Hotel in his pockets. Criminals pursuing Dougie place a bomb under his car. Cooper wanders around the casino and plays slot machines marked by signals from the Black Lodge, winning megajackpots every time. At the Twin Peaks Sheriff's Department, Hawk, Andy and Lucy are unable to discern what is missing. At the FBI headquarters in Philadelphia, Deputy Director Gordon Cole learns about the mysterious killings of Sam and Tracey in New York City, and then receives a call from someone saying that Cooper has been found in South Dakota.
34	4	"Part 4" "... Brings Back Some Memories"	David Lynch	Mark Frost & David Lynch	May 28, 2017	0.195
Cooper wins 30 megajackpots at the casino and is driven to Dougie's home. Dougie's wife, Janey-E, is relieved that they can pay his large gambling debts. Cooper, near-catatonic with his state of mind still damaged, has difficulty settling into his new life as Dougie. He sees a vision of MIKE, who informs him that either he or his doppelgänger must die. At the Twin Peaks Sheriff's Department, Sheriff Frank Truman is updated on Hawk's investigation, and Deputy Bobby Briggs recalls that Cooper was the last person to see his father, Major Briggs, before his death. Andy and Lucy's son, Wally Brando, arrives at the Sheriff's Department to pay his respects to his ill godfather, Harry Truman. Meanwhile, Gordon meets with FBI Chief of Staff Denise Bryson, who assigns him to search for Cooper. Gordon and fellow FBI agents Albert Rosenfield and Tammy Preston travel to South Dakota to interview Cooper's doppelgänger, who claims to have been working undercover with Jeffries. Gordon and Albert discuss their misgivings, suspect a "Blue Rose" case and decide to contact a woman they think can help them.
35	5	"Part 5" "Case Files"	David Lynch	Mark Frost & David Lynch	June 4, 2017	0.254
Dougie's would-be assassins call their terrified boss, Lorraine, who sends a message that activates a black box in Buenos Aires. In Buckhorn, an autopsy finds Dougie's wedding ring in the headless corpse's stomach. Looking into a mirror, Cooper's doppelgänger sees that BOB is still within him. At Dougie's workplace, an insurance company called Lucky 7, Cooper reacts to a statue, coffee, and the words "agent" and "case files". A light above his colleague Anthony Sinclair spurs Cooper to accuse him of lying, angering Sinclair and their boss, Bushnell Mullins. The Mafia-connected casino owners, the Mitchum brothers, beat up and fire a supervisor, believing him complicit in Cooper's winning streak. Car thieves accidentally trigger the bomb under Dougie's car. Jade drops Cooper's Great Northern Hotel room key in a mailbox. In Twin Peaks, Frank is visited at the station by his wife, Doris, who complains about a leaky pipe in their house. Double R Diner waitress Becky and her jobless husband, Steven Burnett, snort drugs after borrowing money from Becky's mother, Shelly. That evening, Dr. Jacoby broadcasts conspiracy theories from his trailer. Jerry Horne in the woods and Nadine Hurley at her home listen to the broadcast. At the Pentagon, Colonel Davis learns the headless corpse's fingerprints match those of Major Briggs. At the Roadhouse, Richard Horne bribes Deputy Chad and molests a woman. Elsewhere, Tammy discovers Cooper's on-file fingerprints are the reverse of the doppelgänger's. Cooper's doppelgänger uses his prison phone call to disrupt the security system. The black box becomes a silver ball.
36	6	"Part 6" "Don't Die"	David Lynch	Mark Frost & David Lynch	June 11, 2017	0.270
Police take the near-catatonic Cooper to Dougie's home and Janey-E receives a photo of Dougie with Jade from criminals demanding Dougie's $20,000 gambling debt plus exorbitant interest of $30,000. Janey-E convinces the criminals to accept a smaller sum. Cooper draws cryptic images on the insurance case files, guided by lights on the pages. Bushnell recognizes a pattern in the drawings and thanks Cooper. Cooper has another vision of MIKE urging him to "wake up". Meanwhile, Todd sends an envelope marked with a black spot to hitman Ike "The Spike" Stadtler, ordering him to kill Lorraine and Dougie. Ike kills Lorraine and her co-workers, destroying his signature weapon in the process. Albert finds Diane, Cooper's erstwhile assistant, in a bar. In Twin Peaks, Red, revealed as a drug supplier, charges Richard Horne with a delivery. Richard speeds in his truck, running over and killing a young boy. Carl Rodd comforts the boy's mother. At the Sheriff's Station, Hawk drops a coin in the restroom and finds pages torn from Laura's diary hidden inside a stall door.
37	7	"Part 7" "There's a Body All Right"	David Lynch	Mark Frost & David Lynch	June 18, 2017	0.294
Hawk and Frank examine the pages, which describe a dream in which Annie Blackburn tells Laura that the good Dale is trapped in the Black Lodge. Frank calls Doc Hayward, who recalls that after returning from the Black Lodge, Cooper sneaked out of intensive care at the hospital where Audrey Horne was in a coma after being critically injured in the Twin Peaks Savings and Loan explosion. Meanwhile, U.S. Navy Lieutenant Cynthia Knox arrives in Buckhorn and learns that Major Briggs's fingerprints come from a body in its forties, not seventies. Albert and Gordon convince Diane to speak to Cooper in prison. She is upset by the conversation and tells Gordon the man is not Cooper. At the same time, the Cooper doppelgänger blackmails Warden Murphy into releasing him and Ray. In Nevada, the police visit Cooper at Dougie's workplace to question him about his destroyed car. As Cooper leaves with Janey-E, Ike runs at them with a gun, but Cooper expertly disarms him while having a vision of the Arm. In Twin Peaks, the owner of the truck Richard drove in the hit-and-run fails to arrive for a meeting with Andy. At the Great Northern Hotel, Beverly tries to find the source of a hum in Ben Horne's office, then returns home to her terminally ill husband, Tom. A young man bursts into the Double R Diner, looking for Billy.
38	8	"Part 8" "Gotta Light?"	David Lynch	Mark Frost & David Lynch	June 25, 2017	0.246
In a standoff, Ray shoots Cooper's doppelgänger. Woodsmen tear at his body, revealing an orb with BOB's face. Ray flees and informs Jeffries that the doppelgänger may have survived. The doppelgänger awakens. In a flashback to 1945 New Mexico, the first atomic bomb is detonated, woodsmen occupy a convenience store and the Experiment spews smoke containing an orb bearing BOB's face. In the building above the purple sea, the Fireman observes these events and levitates, emanating a golden mist and an orb containing Laura Palmer's face. His companion, Señorita Dido, sends the orb to Earth. In 1956 New Mexico, a woodsman descends to the ground, enters a radio station and repeatedly broadcasts a mysterious message, rendering listeners unconscious. A bug/frog-like creature hatches from an egg, enters an unconscious girl's room and climbs down her throat.
39	9	"Part 9" "This Is the Chair"	David Lynch	Mark Frost & David Lynch	July 9, 2017	0.355
Cooper's doppelgänger meets hitmen Hutch and Chantal at a farm and orders them to kill Warden Murphy. He sends a text to Diane and calls Todd to ask if he has done "it" yet. Dougie's boss says that Dougie sometimes has episodes due to a car accident. The Las Vegas police discover no record of Dougie Jones before 1997 and take fingerprints and DNA from his coffee mug. Ike leaves a phone message for a "JT" and is arrested. In Twin Peaks, Bobby visits his mother with Frank and Hawk to ask about Cooper; her husband Major Briggs long ago foretold their arrival, and she gives them a cylinder containing a location, date, and Cooper's name written twice. The FBI stops in Buckhorn to examine the corpse with Major Briggs's fingerprints. Hastings tells Tammy that he and Ruth visited Briggs in another dimension, where he had been "hibernating" for years, and witnessed his beheading as he was saying "Cooper, Cooper". Johnny Horne injures himself, and Jerry Horne hallucinates that his foot is talking.
40	10	"Part 10" "Laura Is the One"	David Lynch	Mark Frost & David Lynch	July 16, 2017	0.267
Richard Horne confronts Miriam, a schoolteacher who witnessed his hit-and-run. She tells him she has written to the sheriff. He attacks her and leaves her for dead in her trailer, then has Deputy Chad intercept the letter. The Mitchum brothers see a news story about Ike's arrest, and recognize Cooper as "Mr. Jackpots". Janey-E notices that her husband's physique has improved and has sex with him. In Twin Peaks, Nadine Hurley watches Jacoby's latest broadcast from her drapery store. Richard attacks his grandmother Sylvia in her home and robs her. She calls Ben and demands money from him. Meanwhile, Todd orders Anthony Sinclair to frame Dougie for the denial of an arson insurance claim that lost the Mitchums $30 million. Gordon has a vision of Laura. Albert informs him that the FBI has intercepted a text message from Diane informing someone of Hastings's arrest. Tammy shows them a photo that links Cooper's doppelgänger with the glass box in New York. Hawk receives another phone call from the Log Lady, who tells him "Laura is the one."
41	11	"Part 11" "There's Fire Where You Are Going"	David Lynch	Mark Frost & David Lynch	July 23, 2017	0.219
A group of children discover Miriam crawling from the underbrush. Becky learns Steven has been cheating on her with Gersten Hayward. She drives to Gersten's apartment and shoots through the front door, but the couple are elsewhere. At the Double R Diner, Becky's parents, Shelly and Bobby, discuss the incident with her. Red arrives and Shelly leaves to kiss him. A child fires a gun through the diner window, causing a commotion. At the location where Hastings met Major Briggs, the FBI finds Ruth's body with coordinates written on one arm. Gordon sees woodsmen in a vortex and is drawn back by Albert. One of the woodsmen sneaks up on Hastings and kills him. While Hawk and Frank study an ancient map, the Log Lady calls Hawk and tells him "There's fire where you are going." In Nevada, Dougie's boss sends Cooper to give the Mitchums a $30 million check after realizing their claim is legitimate. The Mitchums plan to kill Cooper, but after Bradley has a prophetic dream, they decide he is not their enemy and take him for drinks, where Cooper reacts to the words "damn good" while eating cherry pie.
42	12	"Part 12" "Let's Rock"	David Lynch	Mark Frost & David Lynch	July 30, 2017	0.240
Gordon and Albert recruit Tammy and deputize Diane to the Blue Rose task force. In Twin Peaks, Sarah Palmer has an unsettling experience in a grocery store, which leads Deputy Chief Hawk to check on her at her house, where he hears a sound behind Sarah. Albert interrupts Gordon and his French lady friend to show him a text message Diane received asking about Las Vegas. In Twin Peaks, Audrey Horne demands that her husband, Charlie, help her find Billy, her missing lover. He reluctantly phones Tina, and is astonished by what she tells him, but does not tell Audrey what Tina said. Chantal and Hutch assassinate Warden Murphy. At the Great Northern Hotel, Frank visits Ben Horne to tell him his grandson Richard killed the boy in the hit-and-run, and attempted to kill the only witness. Ben agrees to pay Miriam's medical costs and gives Cooper's old room key to Frank as a memento for Harry. Diane finds that the coordinates on Ruth Davenport's arm point to Twin Peaks.
43	13	"Part 13" "What Story is That, Charlie?"	David Lynch	Mark Frost & David Lynch	August 6, 2017	0.280
The Mitchums thank Cooper/Dougie and Bushnell with gifts. Anthony Sinclair is about to poison Cooper/Dougie, but relents and confesses his collusion with Todd to Bushnell. The Las Vegas police dismiss Dougie's fingerprint analysis. Meanwhile, Cooper's doppelgänger arrives in Montana, where Ray is with a gang. The doppelgänger defeats the gang leader in an arm-wrestling match, then kills him, with the gang (including Richard Horne) watching. He questions Ray about the assassination attempt, forces him to give up the coordinates, and shoots him, sending him to the Black Lodge. Hutch and Chantal drive through Utah. At the Double R Diner, Big Ed and Bobby have dinner while Norma meets Walter, who helped franchise her business. Nadine and Dr. Jacoby meet for the first time in years. Sarah watches a loop of a boxing match. Audrey tells Charlie she does not know who or where she is and cannot leave the house. James, performing at the Roadhouse, moves Renee to tears.
44	14	"Part 14" "We Are Like the Dreamer"	David Lynch	Mark Frost & David Lynch	August 13, 2017	0.253
Frank informs Gordon that pages found from Laura's diary suggest two Coopers. Albert tells Tammy about the first Blue Rose case, which involved doppelgängers. Diane identifies Janey-E as her estranged half-sister. Gordon orders the FBI Las Vegas office to search for the Joneses. Chad is arrested. Frank, Hawk, Bobby and Andy follow Major Briggs's instructions to "Jack Rabbit's Palace" in the woods, where they find a naked Naido. Andy is transported to the Fireman, who shows him visions of the events in New Mexico, Laura, two Coopers, Lucy and an electrical pole numbered 6. For her safety the police place Naido in a cell in the Sheriff's Department, next to cells containing Chad and a drunk bleeding from his face. James learns how fellow Great Northern security guard Freddie Sykes bought a strength-enhancing glove and moved to Twin Peaks from London after a vision of the Fireman. James notices a hum in the boiler room. When a trucker insults her in a bar, Sarah opens her face, revealing darkness, and bites his throat, killing him. At the Roadhouse, Megan and Sophie discuss Billy, who stormed into Megan's kitchen, bleeding from his nose and mouth.
45	15	"Part 15" "There's Some Fear in Letting Go"	David Lynch	Mark Frost & David Lynch	August 20, 2017	0.329
Cooper's doppelgänger arrives at the convenience store to ask Jeffries (whose voice comes from a machine) about the assassination attempt and his reference to "Judy". Jeffries tells him he has already met Judy and gives him coordinates. Outside, Richard attacks the doppelgänger, whom he recognized as an FBI agent his mother Audrey once knew, but is subdued. In Las Vegas, Chantal assassinates Todd and his assistant. Cooper reacts to hearing Gordon's name on TV (in Sunset Boulevard), and sticks a metal fork into an electrical socket, rendering him unconscious. Inspired by Dr. Jacoby's show, Nadine tells Ed he is free to pursue Norma. Norma lets Walter buy out the Double R Diner franchise, then accepts Ed's marriage proposal. Gersten attempts to console an armed, suicidal Steven in the woods; hiding from a passerby, she hears a gunshot. The Log Lady calls Hawk and gives him a final message before dying from cancer. Audrey and Charlie continue arguing. At the Roadhouse, James is attacked by Renee's jealous husband, Chuck, whom Freddie punches out with his glove; Freddie and James are arrested. A young woman crawls across the Roadhouse floor and screams.
46	16	"Part 16" "No Knock, No Doorbell"	David Lynch	Mark Frost & David Lynch	August 27, 2017	0.267
Cooper's doppelgänger and Richard Horne follow two of three coordinates the doppelgänger obtained. Observed by Jerry Horne, the doppelgänger sends Richard ahead to the site, where he is electrocuted, and then calls Richard his son. While Cooper lies in a coma, both the FBI and Chantal and Hutch are waiting outside the Jones residence. Chantal and Hutch are killed by a neighbor they provoked in a parking dispute. Cooper wakes from his coma with his memory restored. MIKE tells him that the doppelgänger is still at large and gives him the Owl Cave ring. Cooper gives MIKE some of his hair, asking him to make another tulpa, then has the Mitchums organize a flight to Spokane, Washington. Having received a text from the doppelgänger, Diane tells the task force that, years ago, Cooper raped her and took her to an old gas station. Exclaiming "I'm in the sheriff's station... I'm not me", she pulls a gun but is shot by Albert and Tammy. Diane is drawn to the Black Lodge and dissolves into a seed. Tammy realizes that the Diane they had been associating with is actually a tulpa. At the Roadhouse, Audrey dances to "Audrey's Dance". When a fight breaks out, Audrey begs Charlie to take her home. Suddenly she wakes up, confused and looking into a mirror.
47	17	"Part 17" "The Past Dictates the Future"	David Lynch	Mark Frost & David Lynch	September 3, 2017	0.254
Gordon tells Albert of a secret plan to find "Judy", an "extreme negative force" originally known as "Jowday", and is informed that Cooper is headed for Twin Peaks. The remaining coordinates lead Cooper's doppelgänger to "Jack Rabbit's Palace". He is transported to the Fireman, then to the Sheriff's Department, and is mistaken for the real Cooper. While talking to the doppelgänger, Frank receives a call from Cooper. The doppelgänger draws a gun but is shot by Lucy. Cooper, the FBI and the Mitchums arrive. Woodsmen tear at the Cooper doppelgänger's body, releasing BOB's orb. Freddie knocks out Chad, who had escaped his cell, and smashes BOB's orb by bludgeoning it with his gardening glove, finally killing the demon. Cooper puts the Owl Cave ring on the doppelgänger's finger, sending him to the Black Lodge. Naido transforms into Diane. Cooper unlocks a door at the Great Northern, where MIKE takes him to Jeffries, who transports Cooper back in time to the night Laura died. Cooper prevents Laura's murder and thus changes the whole timeline; in the morning, Laura's corpse vanishes from where it was found by the lake. He takes her hand and walks with her through the woods. In Sarah's house, Sarah smashes Laura's photo, though the photograph itself cannot be torn.
48	18	"Part 18" "What Is Your Name?"	David Lynch	Mark Frost & David Lynch	September 3, 2017	0.240
Cooper's doppelgänger burns in the Black Lodge. MIKE creates another Dougie, who returns to Janey-E and Sonny Jim. As Cooper continues to lead Laura through the woods, she disappears and a woman's scream is heard. Cooper appears in the Black Lodge again, encountering MIKE and the Arm. He emerges and meets Diane in the woods. They drive on a highway for 430 miles and "cross over" an electrical field, then drive to a motel and have sex. Cooper wakes up the next morning alone and finds a note left to "Richard" from "Linda". Arriving at Judy's Diner in Odessa, Texas, Cooper saves a waitress from harassment and obtains the address of another waitress, Carrie Page, who resembles Laura Palmer. Believing she is Laura, he drives her to Twin Peaks, but finds the Palmer house occupied by different owners. They stand in the street, thinking. "What year is this?", Cooper asks Carrie. The wind rushes. Carrie hears Sarah calling Laura's name and screams. The house lights go out. The series closes with a visual callback to Laura whispering to Cooper in the Red Room.

== Release ==
Season 3 intertitle

The season premiered on Showtime on May 21, 2017, with a two-hour episode. After the airing, the premiere and an additional two episodes became available online, and the season aired in weekly increments from that point onwards (at Lynch's insistence). Overall, the series consists of 18 episodes. It concluded on September 3, 2017, with a two-part finale.

In the United Kingdom, Sky Atlantic simulcast the first two episodes beginning at 2:00 am British Summer Time on May 22, 2017, and the next two episodes were released on Sky UK's on-demand service after the premiere. In the Nordic countries, the season is broadcast on HBO Nordic, with the two-hour premiere airing on May 22, and subsequent episodes being made available the day after its U.S. airing. In Canada, the season is available on CraveTV and The Movie Network, and debuted simultaneously with the U.S. broadcast. In Australia, episodes of the season are available to stream on Stan the same day as the original U.S. broadcast. In Japan, the season aired on the satellite television network Wowow, which also aired the original series.

Two episodes were screened at the 2017 Cannes Film Festival. The season was screened in its entirety from January 5–7, 2018, at the Museum of Modern Art, as part of the museum's annual series on "the year's finest films".

== Reception and legacy ==
On Rotten Tomatoes, the season has a 94% approval rating based on 461 reviews, with an average rating of 7.8/10. The site's critical consensus reads: "Surreal, suspenseful, and visually stunning, this new Twin Peaks is an auteurist triumph for David Lynch." On Metacritic, which uses a weighted average, the season holds a score of 74/100 based on 26 critics, indicating "generally favorable" reviews.

Sean T. Collins of Rolling Stone called the season "one of the most groundbreaking TV series ever", praising its original, complex storylines and the performances of its cast, particularly Kyle MacLachlan. Matt Zoller Seitz of Vulture wrote that the show was "the most original and disturbing to hit TV drama since The Sopranos". In his season review for IGN, Matt Fowler noted that Twin Peaks "came back as a true artistic force that challenged just about every storytelling convention we know" and scored it an 8.8 out of ten.

Of the season's two-part premiere, Sonia Saraiya of Variety wrote:

Twin Peaks: The Return is weird and creepy and slow. But it is interesting. The show is very stubbornly itself—not quite film and not quite TV, rejecting both standard storytelling and standard forms. It's not especially fun to watch and it can be quite disturbing. But there is never a sense that you are watching something devoid of vision or intention. Lynch's vision is so total and absolute that he can get away with what wouldn't be otherwise acceptable.

The Hollywood Reporter's Daniel Fienberg wrote of the season's format:

It's obvious this Twin Peaks is going to be an 18-hour unit. There was no discernible separation between hours and if credits hadn't rolled, the second hour could probably just as easily have flowed into the third. This isn't episodic TV: It's another thing.

In her "A" grade review of the premiere, Emily L. Stephens of The A.V. Club wrote of its possible reception by critics and viewers:

If you were looking forward to a return of the sometimes campy, sometimes cozy humor of the original two seasons of Twin Peaks, this premiere could come as a shock. If you were anticipating that once jolting, now familiar blend of genres, this is ... not that ... but pure Lynchian horror.

Lynch screened the two-hour premiere of the season at the 2017 Cannes Film Festival, and received a five-minute standing ovation from the crowd.

Several critics gave unfavorable reviews. Michael Ausiello of TVLine wrote: "To say I was disappointed by the revival's indulgent, incomprehensible, taxing opening act would be a towering understatement. I won't even attempt to break down the central storyline because, well, there is no central storyline. There are five or six narrative threads that are randomly intercut throughout the two hours featuring mostly new and uninteresting characters played by actors as wooden as the nightstand drawer pull in which Josie was trapped, and scenes that dragged on for what felt like eternity." In Time, Daniel D'Addario wrote that the show, in contrast to its first two seasons, "has chosen to tell a story that's odder and bigger—so big, in fact, that it has so far choked off what made Twin Peaks work all along." Tim Goodman of The Hollywood Reporter found much of the show's oddities an "affectation", writing, "I'm finding Lynch's many indulgences trying at this point but will keep watching to the end, even though it has rather aggressively been a show I find a chore to watch." The Guardian wrote: "at least the original series had the viewer-friendly structure of a whodunnit to glue the peculiarities together. The start of the new run is more of a what-is-it?"

Film journals Sight & Sound and Cahiers du cinéma respectively deemed the season the second-best and the best "film" of the year, with the former placing it behind Get Out. In Vox, Emily St. James referenced the season in discussing the artistic difference, if any, between theatrical film and TV series in the streaming era. Metacritic ranked Twin Peaks the second-best TV series of 2017; 20 major publications ranked it the best show of the year. In 2019, Twin Peaks was ranked 22nd on The Guardian's list of the 100 best TV shows of the 21st century. Writer-director Jim Jarmusch called the season "a masterpiece" and the single best piece of American cinema of the preceding ten years. Filmmaker John Waters called the season "even artier and more insane" than the original series and said, "I'm just amazed how" Lynch "ever got it past the studio that made it when he showed them the script".

=== 2017 critics' top ten lists ===
The series has appeared on the following lists:

- No. 1 Rolling Stone
- No. 1 Matt Zoller Seitz of Vulture
- No. 1 Collider
- No. 1 Esquire
- No. 1 The Washington Post
- No. 1 The Playlist
- No. 1 Thrillist
- No. 2 The A.V. Club
- No. 2 Entertainment Weekly
- No. 2 Now
- No. 2 The Ringer
- No. 3 IndieWire
- No. 3 Slant
- No. 4 Variety
- No. 5 Paste
- No. 6 Uproxx
- No. 10 Adweek
- — The Atlantic
- — NPR
- — Los Angeles Times
- — The New York Times
- — Vogue

=== Ratings ===
The two-hour premiere on May 21, 2017, received 506,000 viewers on Showtime, which Deadline Hollywood called "soft for such a strongly promoted prestige project". Ratings increased to 626,000 after the encore broadcasts that night and the premiere also had over 450,000 viewers via streaming and on-demand.

Viewership for the premiere increased to 804,000 in Live+3 ratings, and it had a viewership of 1.7 million across streaming and on-demand platforms. Showtime announced that the weekend of the Twin Peaks premiere had the most signups to their streaming service ever. Prior to the finale, the season was averaging two million weekly viewers, when including time-shifting, encores and streaming. Showtime president David Nevins said that Twin Peaks "has exceeded expectations" from a financial perspective.

=== Awards and nominations ===
Awards and nominations received by Twin Peaks: The Return
Award	Year (Note: The listed year refers to the date of the ceremony, not necessarily the year in which the corresponding season or episode aired.)	Category	Nominee(s)	Result	Ref.
ADG Excellence in Production Design Awards	2018	Excellence in Production Design for a One-Hour Contemporary Single-Camera Series	Ruth De Jong, Cara Brower, Nancy Deren, Scott Herbertson, Barbara Mesney, Jason Perrine, Karen Teneyck, Florencia Martin (for "My Log Has a Message for You", "Gotta Light?", and "There's Some Fear in Letting Go")	Nominated	
Bram Stoker Awards	2018	Best Screenplay	David Lynch, Mark Frost (for "Gotta Light?")	Nominated	
Cinema Audio Society Awards	2018	Outstanding Achievement in Sound Mixing for Television Movie or Mini-Series	Douglas Axtell, Dean Hurley, Ronald Eng (for "Gotta Light?")	Nominated	
Dorian Awards	2018	TV Drama of the Year	Twin Peaks	Nominated	
Dorian Awards	2018	TV Performance of the Year	Kyle MacLachlan	Won	
Empire Awards	2018	Best TV Series	Twin Peaks	Nominated	
Empire Awards	2018	Best Actor in a TV Series	Kyle MacLachlan	Nominated	
Golden Globe Awards	2018	Best Performance by an Actor in a Limited Series or a Motion Picture Made for Television	Kyle MacLachlan	Nominated	
Golden Reel Awards	2018	Outstanding Achievement in Sound Editing – Music Score and Musical for Episodic Short Form Broadcast Media	David Lynch, Dean Hurley (for "Gotta Light?")	Nominated	
Make-Up Artists and Hair Stylists Guild Awards	2018	Best Contemporary Makeup – Television Mini-Series or Motion Picture Made for Television	Debbie Zoller, Richard Redlefsen, Mandi Ann Ruiz	Nominated	
Make-Up Artists and Hair Stylists Guild Awards	2018	Best Period and/or Character Makeup – Television Mini-Series or Motion Picture Made for Television	Debbie Zoller, Richard Redlefsen, Mandi Ann Ruiz	Nominated	
Make-Up Artists and Hair Stylists Guild Awards	2018	Best Special Makeup Effects – Television Mini-Series or Motion Picture Made for Television	Debbie Zoller, Richard Redlefsen, Jamie Kelman	Nominated	
Primetime Emmy Awards	2018	Outstanding Directing for a Limited or Anthology Series or Movie	David Lynch	Nominated	
Primetime Emmy Awards	2018	Outstanding Writing for a Limited or Anthology Series or Movie	David Lynch, Mark Frost	Nominated	
Primetime Creative Arts Emmy Awards	2018	Outstanding Cinematography for a Limited or Anthology Series or Movie	Peter Deming (for "Gotta Light?")	Nominated	
Primetime Creative Arts Emmy Awards	2018	Outstanding Hairstyling for a Limited Series or Movie	Clare M. Corsick, Bryn E. Leetch	Nominated	
Primetime Creative Arts Emmy Awards	2018	Outstanding Makeup for a Limited Series or Movie (Non-Prosthetic)	Debbie Zoller, Richard Redlefsen	Nominated	
Primetime Creative Arts Emmy Awards	2018	Outstanding Production Design for a Narrative Contemporary Program (One Hour or More)	Ruth De Jong, Cara Brower, Florencia Martin	Nominated	
Primetime Creative Arts Emmy Awards	2018	Outstanding Single-Camera Picture Editing for a Limited Series or Movie	Duwayne Dunham, Brian Berdan, Jonathan P. Shaw, Justin Krohn, Jason W. A. Tucker, David Lynch (for "Gotta Light?")	Nominated	
Primetime Creative Arts Emmy Awards	2018	Outstanding Sound Editing for a Limited Series, Movie, or Special	Ronald Eng, Dean Hurley, David Lynch, David A. Cohen, Kerry Dean Williams, Luke Gibleon, Willard Overstreet (for "Gotta Light?")	Nominated	
Primetime Creative Arts Emmy Awards	2018	Outstanding Sound Mixing for a Limited Series or Movie	Douglas Axtell, Dean Hurley, Ronald Eng (for "Gotta Light?")	Nominated	
Saturn Awards	2018	Best Television Presentation	Twin Peaks	Won	
Saturn Awards	2018	Best Actor on Television	Kyle MacLachlan	Won	
Saturn Awards	2018	Best Supporting Actor on Television	Miguel Ferrer (posthumous)	Nominated	
Saturn Awards	2018	Best Guest Starring Role on Television	David Lynch	Won	
Saturn Awards	2018	Best DVD or Blu-ray Television Series Release	Twin Peaks: A Limited Event Series	Nominated	
TCA Awards	2018	Outstanding Achievement in Movies, Miniseries and Specials	Twin Peaks	Nominated	

== Analysis ==
Franck Boulègue's The Return of Twin Peaks: Squaring the Circle comprehensively analyzes Twin Peaks: The Return, exploring its narrative complexity, cultural impact, and philosophical underpinnings. Boulègue frames the series as a unique hybrid of television and cinema, characterized by its nonlinear storytelling and engagement with themes of time, memory, and the uncanny. The book examines the show's departure from traditional formats and its reflection on the medium's evolution, positioning The Return as a bold artistic experiment that challenges viewer expectations.

Kristina Šekrst examines Twin Peaks: The Return through the lens of binge-watching and media psychology. Šekrst highlights how Lynch's work challenges the boundaries between film and television, calling the third season an "18-hour movie" that defies traditional episodic structures. She connects the immersive narrative to recent neurological and psychological findings, exploring how seriality affects attention spans and viewer engagement.

Dominique Chateau investigates the series' unique storytelling techniques. Chateau emphasizes Lynch's "filmic ideas", in which narrative structure intertwines with dream logic to create a layered, surreal experience. Using concepts from narratology and possible worlds theory, Chateau discusses how The Return blurs the line between reality and imagination, pushing the boundaries of serial storytelling and traditional cinematic aesthetics.

Dominic Lash examines the series' pervasive theme of doubling. Lash argues that The Return acts as a "double" itself, layering fans' expectations of a revival onto the show's narrative while simultaneously subverting them. Through extensive use of doubles, from characters like Dougie Jones to Laura Palmer's parallel lives, the series blends nostalgia and defamiliarization. Lash concludes that The Return achieves a paradoxical fidelity to its original by taking bold creative liberties with its legacy.

== Home media ==
The season was released on Blu-ray and DVD on December 5, 2017, under the title Twin Peaks: A Limited Event Series. The set includes more than six hours of behind-the-scenes content.

In the 2017 Home Media Awards, which honor the year's best home video releases, Twin Peaks: A Limited Event Series won four awards: Title of the Year, TV on Disc of the Year, Best TV Movie or Miniseries, and Best Extras/Bonus Material.

== Future ==
Lynch and Frost expressed interest in making another season of Twin Peaks, but Lynch said that such a project would not be immediately forthcoming, given that it took them four-and-a-half years to write and film the third season. In June 2018, Lynch said the story was "calling", but that "there are a lot of disturbances"; in August, he said he was working through ideas with producer Sabrina Sutherland. In April 2020, he said "nothing was happening" regarding further Twin Peaks. Lynch died on January 16, 2025, making the production of any further episodes or any sort of revival of the series unlikely.

Several months after Lynch's death, Frost said, "Long ago, with the show, we adopted a policy of never saying never ... That's still in play, even though David's not here anymore. I'm open to anything. I just finished my last book, which is coming out next year, so we'll see."
