= Mike (Twin Peaks) =

Fictional character from the television series Twin Peaks

- Twin Peaks character
- First appearance: "Pilot" (1990)
- Last appearance: "Part 18" (2017)
- Created by: David Lynch and Mark Frost
- Portrayed by: Al Strobel

In-universe information
- Affiliated with: Black and White Lodges

Phillip Michael Gerard (a.k.a. Mike) is a character in the TV series Twin Peaks, portrayed by Al Strobel. He is sometimes referred to as MIKE (in capitals) or as the One-Armed Man. He is a demonic spirit and one of the Otherworld characters in the series. Claiming to have "seen the face of God," Mike works with Agent Cooper to trap/kill Bob, the series' primary antagonist, for past slights against him and other inhabitants of The Black Lodge, the realm of pure evil from which Mike and Bob originate. He appears in every season and in Twin Peaks: Fire Walk with Me.

== Character overview ==
Mike is an inhabiting spirit similar to the primary villain of the series, Bob (Frank Silva), who was his partner in serial murder. After committing several rape/murders with Bob, Mike had a religious epiphany and repented, cutting off his own arm to rid himself of a tattoo that read "Fire Walk with Me", which symbolized being touched by "The devilish one". Bob had an identical tattoo on his arm. Bob, however, would not repent. Mike has spent years trying to find and stop Bob.

In contrast with Bob, Mike only ever appears in the visual form of his host, traveling shoe salesman Phillip Michael Gerard. Gerard lost his arm in a car accident. He also had a tattoo of the word "mom" on his arm.

Mike is portrayed by Al Strobel.

== History and description ==
=== Television series ===
After FBI Special Agent Dale Cooper (Kyle MacLachlan) comes to Twin Peaks to investigate the murder of Laura Palmer (Sheryl Lee), Mike appears to Cooper in a dream, explaining his and Bob's history, but in a way that is not immediately clear. He shows Cooper a vision of Bob as he appeared in life. Later, Cooper, Deputy Hawk (Michael Horse), and Sheriff Harry Truman (Michael Ontkean) locate Philip Gerard, who is at the time unable to give them any information. Later, in the show's second season, Mike is key to solving Laura Palmer's murder.

=== Prequel film ===
In the prequel film Twin Peaks: Fire Walk with Me, during a scene taking place in the Red Room "contained" in the Black Lodge, the Man from Another Place (Michael J. Anderson) confronts Cooper and asks, "Do you know who I am?" Cooper shakes his head, and the Man From Another Place responds, "I am the arm". This gives the indication that he is the arm that Mike removed in order to get rid of the tattoo that linked him with Bob on the left shoulder.

Mike also harasses Leland Palmer (Ray Wise), Bob's host, in a road rage incident where he accuses Leland of "stealing the corn", and that "the thread will be torn." Before driving away, Mike tries to tell Laura that Leland is indeed Bob's host.

The film reveals that Mike was present on the night of Laura's murder and was, unintentionally, the reason Ronette Pulaski (Phoebe Augustine) survived and escaped; he had tracked Bob down and his efforts to enter the train car (in which Laura and Ronette had been raped), led to Ronette falling through the momentarily opened door. Bob swiftly shut the door again, denying Mike any chance of saving Laura's life, but as Bob closed the door, Mike threw the Owl Ring into the train car, which Laura put on, preventing Bob from possessing her (as he had originally intended).

At the end of the film, after Leland murders Laura, he enters the Black Lodge and sits beside Mike, Bob and the Man from Another Place.

=== Revived series ===
In the 2017 revived series, Mike (credited as Phillip Gerard) appears once again in the Red Room as a sort of guide for Cooper, who is transported back into the real world after being imprisoned in the alternate dimension for 25 years.

== Interpretation ==
Al Strobel himself had lost an arm as a teenager. Regarding the character, the loss of his arm has been associated with a manner to "mark his inner visions and schizophrenic divisions" by David Lavery in his book about the series.

The character is described by Jeff Johnson as "a physical representation of the psychic split between the rational and irrational, the orderly and the chaotic, the dream world and real life", essential to Lynch's visions of the world and its way of "framing characters".

The moment when Mike reads his poem in the Red Room is described by Tom O'Connor as one of the first "poetic-percepts" in the series, taking place in a "border space" "between two worlds" (as the poem names it) that functions has a "virtual"/"multiplicitous" element in the economy of the narrative.

Approaching Twin Peaks indicates that the character whose "full human name is Phillip Michael Gerard [...] is a directorial nod to the one-armed character in The Fugitive television series".

The pair MIKE/BOB is one of the doublings that the series uses, to create suspense, repeating another Bob-and-Mike pair (Laura's first boyfriends), according to Allrath and Gymnich. Mike is also noted as one of the disabled characters in the series.

Mike is also the former owner of the Owl Cave ring that appears in another dream sequence that takes place in the Black Lodge, and notes that "Bob seems to kill anyone who wears it. The ring wearer also loses feeling in the left arm, which could refer to "Mike's lost arm."
