= Nicole LaLiberte =

American actress (born 1981)

Nicole LaLiberté
- Born: December 1, 1981 (age 44)
- Occupation: Actress
- Years active: 2007–present

Nicole LaLiberté (born December 1, 1981) is an American actress. She has had recurring roles on the television series How to Make It in America (2011) and Dexter (2012–2013) and most notably played Darya in David Lynch's Twin Peaks: The Return.

== Career ==
LaLiberté moved from Upstate New York to New York City at age 12 in 1993, to study ballet at the School of American Ballet. After years as a ballerina, she transitioned into modeling appearing in the 2002 Lavazza Calendar shot by David La Chapelle, Arthur Elgort's book Camera Crazy and in magazines including Vogue Italia, W and Photo.

LaLiberté began acting in 2007. Her first acting role was in a play that her friend Michael Domitrovich had written and wanted her to be in. Called Artfuckers, it ran Off-Off Broadway at the Theater for the New City from February 19 to March 4, 2007 and then Off-Broadway at the DR2 Theatre from February 8 to March 16, 2008. The play itself was met with mixed reviews but the performances, particularly LaLiberté's were generally praised. Mark Blankenship of Variety said that she "brings believable grit to her one-dimensional, frequently naked role as a heartless nymphette."

Her first screen performances were brief appearances in episodes of Law & Order: Criminal Intent and Rescue Me in 2007. In 2009, she played the lead role in the film My Normal, about a lesbian dominatrix with dreams of becoming a film maker, and had a small role in an episode of Nurse Jackie. In 2010, she starred in three films: Gregg Araki's film Kaboom which premiered at Cannes; the comedy Dinner for Schmucks; and Paul Morrissey's drama News from Nowhere which had its premiere at the Venice Film Festival.

Her first major role came in 2011, playing the recurring role of Lulu in the second season of HBO's How to Make It in America. That year she also appeared in the drama film Shouting Secrets. In 2012, she played Arlene Schram in the seventh season of Dexter. She also appeared in another four films: the romantic comedy Wifed Out; played a lead role in Girls Against Boys; had a small role in the comedy Nous York; and starred alongside Emily Blunt, Colin Firth and Anne Heche in Arthur Newman. In 2013, she starred in an episode of The Mentalist, reprised her role as Arlene Schram in the eighth season of Dexter and had roles in the films In a World..., written and directed by Lake Bell, and Fractured, a horror film.

She appeared as Kitty Greenburg alongside Michael Cera in "Man Rots from the Head", a short written and directed by Janicza Bravo, and as Miss President in the independent film Adam Green's Aladdin. She played the new character of Darya in Twin Peaks: The Return, and Tess in the Jim Carrey-produced I'm Dying Up Here, both for Showtime.

In 2018 she played the starring role, Joan of Arc, in Regarding the Case of Joan of Arc, written and directed by Matthew Wilder, which premiered at the International Film Festival of India in Goa, India.

== Filmography ==
Television
Year	Title	Role	Notes
2007	Law & Order: Criminal Intent	Starlet	Episode: "Bombshell"
2007	Rescue Me	Knockout	Episode: "Keefe"
2009	Nurse Jackie	Model	Episode: "Health Care and Cinema"
2011	How to Make It in America	Lulu	Recurring character
2013	The Mentalist	Annabelle Sugalski	Episode: "Little Red Corvette"
2012–2013	Dexter	Arlene Schram	Episode: "Do You See What I See"; Episode: "Surprise, Motherfucker!"; Episode: "Make Your Own Kind of Music"
2017	Twin Peaks	Darya	Part 1 and Part 2
	I'm Dying Up Here	Tess	
2019	Now Apocalypse	Cleopatra	

Films
Year	Title	Role
2009	My Normal	Natalie
2010	Superego	Scarlet
2010	Kaboom	Madeleine O'Hara/Rebecca Novak
2010	Dinner for Schmucks	Christina - Bird Girl
2010	News from Nowhere	Natalie
2011	Shouting Secrets	Bianca
2012	Wifed Out	
2012	Girls Against Boys	Lulu
2012	Nous York	Rachel
2012	Arthur Newman	Silverlake
2013	In a World...	Amazon Warrior
2013	Fractured	Marlena
2015	Here Now	Lilith
2016	Adam Green's Aladdin	Ms. President
2016	Stale Ramen	Elise
2016	Smartass	Chuchu
2016	She's in Portland	Maggie
2016	Man Rots from the Head	Kitty Greenburg
2018	Regarding the Case of Joan of Arc	Joan of Arc
2020	She's in Portland	Maggie
2021	The Gesture and the Word	Eloise (the florist)
2021	La Flamme Rouge	Valerie
2021	Zero Road	Nikki
2022	Dog	Zoe
