= Phillip Jeffries =

Twin Peaks character

- Twin Peaks character
- First appearance: Twin Peaks: Fire Walk with Me (1992)
- Last appearance: "Part 17" (2017)
- Portrayed by: David Bowie
- Voiced by: Nathan Frizzell (in The Return)

In-universe information
- Occupation: FBI Special Agent Director of the Blue Rose Task Force
- Nationality: American
- Duration: 1992; 2017

FBI Special Agent Phillip Jeffries is a fictional character in the Twin Peaks franchise. He was created by series creator David Lynch and portrayed by David Bowie and voiced and dubbed by Nathan Frizzell in Twin Peaks: The Return. He first appeared in the prequel film Twin Peaks: Fire Walk with Me, Twin Peaks: The Missing Pieces, which extended his role from the film, and returns in the 2017 revival series.

Jeffries was an agent of the Federal Bureau of Investigation who disappeared while on assignment in Buenos Aires, Argentina in 1987.

His role was expanded in the 2017 revival series, but with the death of Bowie, Jeffries is instead depicted as a white glowing orb emitted by a large kettle-shaped machine, in a motel room above a convenience store. Before his death, Bowie gave Lynch permission to reuse footage of his character from the movie on the condition that he be dubbed by a Louisianan actor.

== Appearances ==
=== Twin Peaks: Fire Walk with Me and Twin Peaks: The Missing Pieces ===
Phillip Jeffries is shown checking into a hotel in Buenos Aires. Jeffries is then seen vanishing when entering an elevator. He emerges from a different elevator several years later at the Philadelphia FBI office. He was believed to have disappeared two years ago while on assignment in Argentina. He hurries to the office of his former superior, Regional Bureau Chief Gordon Cole and starts raving in a loud and disturbed manner rambling about Judy while also insisting that she not be discussed, and referring at one stage to Special Agent Dale Cooper and yelling “Who do you think this/that is, there?" Jeffries went on to narrate in an abstract fashion where he had been since his disappearance, discussing a discovery in Seattle of a meeting he witnessed above a convenience store and an important ring. Cole had Albert try to figure out how Jeffries got into the building, while Cooper, noticing the lights flickering, ran back out into the hallway. As Jeffries continued his rant, Cole tried to call for backup. He then vanishes after realizing it's February 1989. Jeffries reemerged in Buenos Aires, scaring a maid and the same bellhop from 1987, who had seen him vanish and now reappear. Very soon after this, Jeffries disappeared, this time seemingly permanently.

=== Twin Peaks: The Return ===
By the time of Dale Cooper's entrapment in The Black Lodge, Jeffries had somehow lost his human form, and by September 2014 he appeared to have become a white glowing orb emitted from the end of a large kettle-shaped device. His chamber was located behind room #8 at a motel only accessible from the upper floor of a certain convenience store.

Around this time, another individual began assuming Jeffries' identity, hiring Ray Monroe and Darya to kill the doppelgänger, who is known to his associates as "Mr. C". While in South Dakota, Mr. C attempted to contact Jeffries via radio, only to find this imposter on the other end. The imposter states they “missed [Mr. C] in New York”, and reveals they know the doppelganger had met with Major Garland Briggs. "Jeffries" is calling to tell Mr. C goodbye, as the doppelgänger would be "going back in" the next day and that they would “be with BOB again.” The imposter disconnects the call.

Albert Rosenfield reveals to Gordon Cole that someone claiming to be Jeffries requested information from him concerning a man in Colombia, claiming that it was pertinent to the safety of Dale Cooper. A week later, the agent in Colombia was killed. In one of his Monica Bellucci dreams, Gordon Cole relived the strange incident in 1989 where Jeffries had appeared in Philadelphia and cast doubt on Dale Cooper's identity, which Cole had since forgotten. Albert also admitted that he was starting to remember the day Cole referred to.

After shooting Mr. C, Ray contacted "Phillip" on his phone and said that he believed Mr. C was dead, or else Ray would finish the job when Mr. C found him at "the farm." At gunpoint, Monroe later confessed to Mr. C that somebody named Phillip Jeffries had orchestrated the prison break and ordered him to place a ring on Mr. C's body after he died. Jeffries was in hiding somewhere called "the Dutchman's."

Looking for Judy, Mr. C drove to the convenience store and received an audience with the real Jeffries. He learns Jeffries had no involvement with Ray. Mr. C then asked him about Judy, whom Jeffries had previously mentioned at the FBI office back in 1989, and whether Judy wanted something from Mr. C. Jeffries responded that he could ask Judy himself, and a series of numbers floated out of his orb, which Mr. C wrote down.

After the real Dale Cooper killed his doppelgänger, he accompanied MIKE to see Jeffries in person. Cooper tells Jeffries he is interested in a particular date: February 23, 1989, and Jeffries agrees to find it for him. Commenting that it was "slippery in here" Jeffries eventually manifested the symbol found in Owl Cave, which turned into an "8" symbol with a bead modulating around its lower half. Jeffries said that this was where he could find Judy. He also added: "There may be... someone. Did you ask me this?" Jeffries said to give Gordon Cole his regards, and that Cole would remember "the unofficial version." In a loud crackle of electricity, Cooper appeared in the woods near Twin Peaks in 1989.

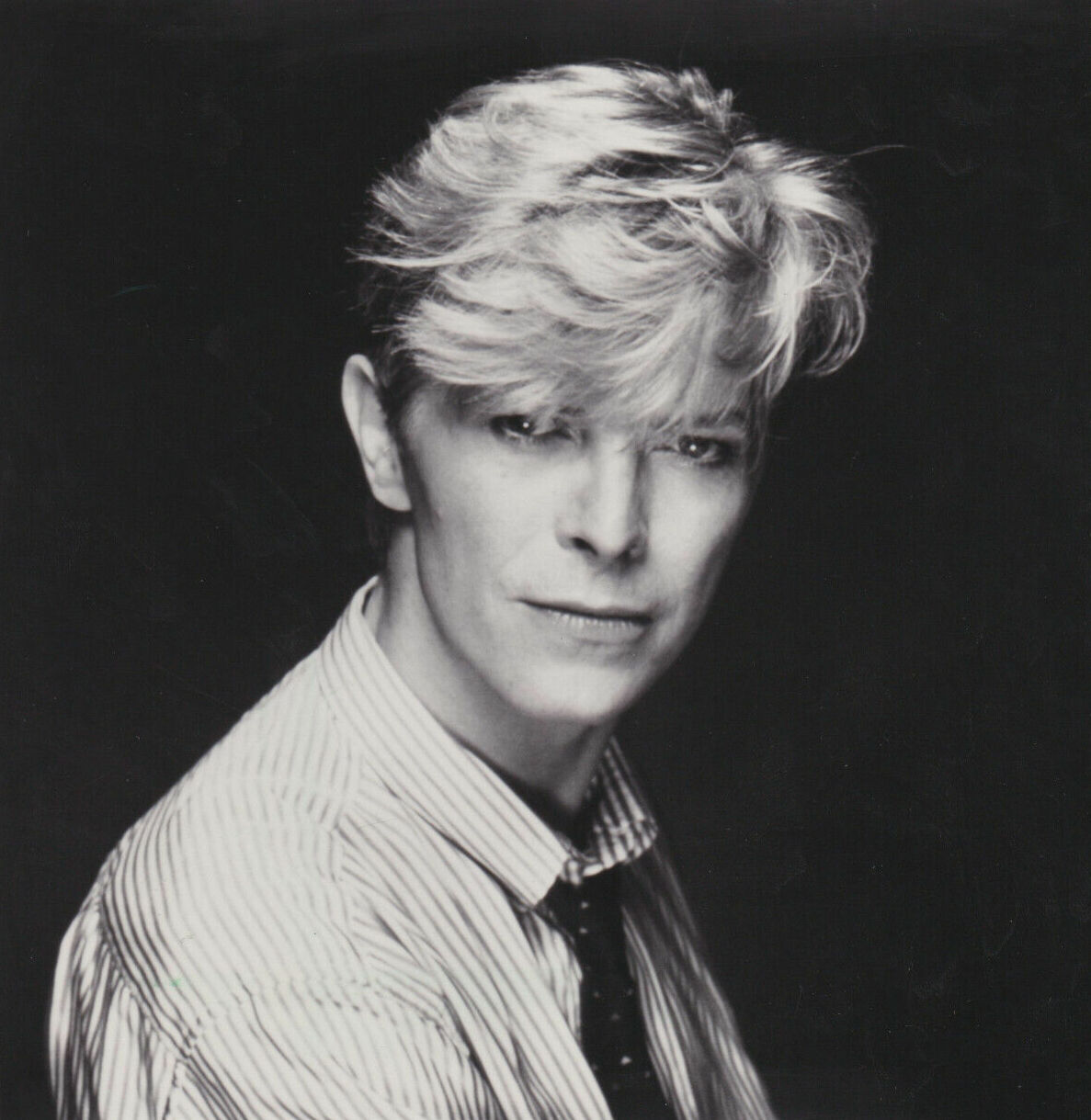
David Bowie (pictured in 1983) portrayed Phillip Jeffries

== Behind the scenes ==
The original editing of Fire Walk With Me puts Jeffries's reappearance in 1988 since it is before the "one year later" hard title. But the shooting script, The Missing Pieces, The Secret History of Twin Peaks, and Part 15 of The Return put it in 1989.

David Bowie was approached to reprise his role as Jeffries in the 2017 limited series, but his lawyer informed David Lynch that he was unavailable due to his declining health, which was not public knowledge until his death on January 10, 2016. Bowie gave Lynch permission to reuse footage of the character from the film, however, he was unhappy with the accent he had used in the film, so he requested to have his voice re-dubbed by an authentic Louisianan actor.
