= Log Lady =

Fictional character from Twin Peaks

Margaret Lanterman
- Twin Peaks character
- First appearance: "Pilot" (1990)
- Last appearance: "Part 15" (2017)
- Created by: David Lynch and Mark Frost
- Portrayed by: Catherine E. Coulson

In-universe information
- Occupation: Ballroom dancing teacher (retired)
- Birth date: October 10, 1940

Margaret Lanterman (née Coulson), better known as the Log Lady, is a fictional character in the television series Twin Peaks (1990–2017), created by Mark Frost and David Lynch. She appears in both seasons of the show, the prequel film Twin Peaks: Fire Walk with Me, and the 2017 revival series.

The character is portrayed by Catherine E. Coulson. The Log Lady was her final role, as she died of complications from cancer in 2015, two years before the airing of the revived series; she appears in five episodes, in scenes shot shortly before her death.

== Character overview ==
The Log Lady is a fixture in the town of Twin Peaks by the time of Laura Palmer's murder, and most residents in the town regard her as crazy. This is mainly due to her habit of always carrying a small log in her arms, with which she seems to share a psychic connection, often dispensing advice and visions of clairvoyance which she claims come from the log; prior to the murder, she delivers moving and cryptic warnings to Laura Palmer herself. The Log Lady does not interpret the messages transmitted by the log, but instead functions as a medium for the information it conveys.

In attempting to solve Laura's murder, Dale Cooper often makes use of the Log Lady's apparent ability to communicate, through the log, with a possibly supernatural realm. Cooper gradually loses his access to this realm as the series progresses, and the Log Lady becomes a less central figure, though she does provide Cooper with at least one useful tip.

When the series was syndicated to Bravo, Lynch created new Log Lady introductions for each episode ranging in length from under a minute to about three minutes.

== History ==
=== Conceptual history ===
According to David Lynch, the Log Lady was an old idea of his, where he had intended to do a television series based on the character called "I'll Test My Log with Every Branch of Knowledge". The idea came about while working alongside Catherine Coulson on the set of Lynch's directorial debut, Eraserhead. The series would've focused on a middle-aged woman caring for a small child of indeterminate origin, whom she would have taught lessons by way of the log's example—such as subjecting the log to a dental examination to demonstrate the need of tooth checkups.

=== History within the series and feature film ===
It is revealed that the Log Lady's husband was a lumberjack who died in a fire on their wedding night decades before the events of the series (The Log Lady later says that her husband "met the devil"). Nothing is revealed of her husband beyond this, save for that at some point before he died, her husband returned from a trip to Glastonbury Grove (which served as an access point to the metaphysical realms of both the White and Black Lodges) with a jar of mysterious oil, which he claimed was for "opening a gateway". (However, when the story of her husband's death is first related in the series, Deputy Hawk mentions that the wood "holds many spirits", so it is possible that her husband's spirit resides in her log.)

On February 18, 1989, five days before Laura Palmer is murdered, Margaret briefly encounters Laura outside the local roadhouse, the Bang Bang Bar. Putting her hand to the log and then the stunned Laura's forehead, Margaret intones: "When this kind of fire starts, it is very hard to put out. The tender boughs of innocence burn first, and the wind rises, and then all goodness is in jeopardy."

On the night Laura is murdered, Margaret later claims "my log" witnessed "two men, two girls" both approaching Jacques Renault's cabin—which is located a distance away from her own cabin home in the woods. And then, not long after, she alleges the log heard the screams of a girl.

The Log Lady first comes to the attention of FBI Agent Dale Cooper at a town meeting on February 24—the day after Laura Palmer's murder, which Cooper is investigating. She later approaches Cooper in the Double R Diner, who is clearly skeptical at her claim "my log saw something that night."

Four days later, Cooper arrives at the Log Lady's cabin alongside Sheriff Truman, Doc Hayward, and Deputy Hawk. Cooper is now more open to the log's power following his questioning (perhaps also noting the local men's reverence for the Log Lady's knowledge).

The Log Lady also provides advice to the other townspeople, most notably an other-worldly message she tells Major Briggs to deliver to Cooper and, it is strongly implied, to Donna Hayward in a note mentioning Laura's involvement in the Meals-On-Wheels.

She also guides Cooper to the Bang Bang Bar to see a vision of the Giant on the stage to hear his words: "It is happening again," a reference to Maddy Ferguson's murder, which was occurring at the same time.

During the disastrous Miss Twin Peaks Pageant, the Log Lady is impersonated in a bizarre disguise by the insane former FBI Agent Windom Earle, who intends to abduct the winning girl to help provide the means to enter the Black Lodge. Following his abduction of Annie Blackburn, the Log Lady arrives while Cooper, Truman, and the sheriff's deputies are regrouping at the Sheriff's Station in a desperate move to learn Earle's location. She then presents Cooper with the jar of oil her husband retrieved from Glastonbury Grove, thereby, providing Cooper with the means to enter the Black Lodge.

In Twin Peaks: The Return, which is set roughly 25 years after the original series, a terminally ill Log Lady has several telephone conversations with Deputy Tommy "Hawk" Hill, providing guidance in the Sheriff Department's investigation into Special Agent Dale Cooper's disappearance. She dies in the fifteenth episode, shortly after telling Hawk that her log has turned gold. The Sheriff's Department all gather together to mourn her death.

=== Background history ===
In The Secret History of Twin Peaks, an epistolary novel by Mark Frost, details of Margaret's childhood are revealed. Her maiden name is Coulson (the same as the actor who plays her) and she was born on October 10, 1940. In 1947, Maggie Coulson was one of three elementary school students who disappeared in the woods during a school nature walk (the others were Alan Traherne and Carl Rodd—owner of the Fat Trout Trailer Park in Fire Walk With Me). The children were found a day later, having lost time and bearing strange triangular marks on their skin. The book also revealed that the name of her late husband was Samson Lanterman.

== In popular culture ==
Shortly after Twin Peaks premiered, the contemporaneous new television series Northern Exposure featured a reference to the Log Lady in Season 1, episode 5 "Russian Flu" (1990). Several characters find themselves on a viewing platform at a waterfall and peering through the binoculars see a "lady" holding something, which they determine to be a log. This happens while music reminiscent of Twin Peaks is playing.

In Season 1, episode 14 "Mr. Chaney" (1992) of the American television show Eerie, Indiana, the main protagonist, Marshall Teller is rescued from a werewolf by another character known as "The Kid with the Grey Hair" by means of hitting the werewolf on the head with a log. Immediately afterwards Marshall exclaims "It's you!" to which The Kid with the Grey Hair responds "Well it ain't the Log Lady."

In the Darkwing Duck episode "Twin Beaks", Launchpad McQuack acts like the Log Lady, even carrying a log, which advises him and Darkwing to be careful, and going as far as warning them that the cows are not what they seem, mirroring the Log Lady's iconic "The owls are not what they seem." warning.

The 2010 video game Alan Wake features many references to Twin Peaks, amongst which is a character called the "Lamp Lady", a woman who carries a lamp around in public while uttering cryptic sentences.

Coulson appears carrying a log in "Dual Spires", an episode of the TV series Psych which parodies Twin Peaks.

In 2014, Coulson reprised the role of the Log Lady in the music video for "Unknown Species" by Pretty Little Demons.

The video game Deadly Premonition which is heavily influenced by Twin Peaks, features a character called Roaming Sigourney, also known as Granny with the Pot, who roams the town always carrying a pot containing an unknown dish. She claims that the Pot knows things that may pertain to the case being investigated in the game.

In the sixth episode of the first season of the Norwegian teen drama web series Skam there is a Halloween party where character Noora dresses up as Coulson for the party.

In the video game Thimbleweed Park, heavily influenced by Twin Peaks 2017, the Log Lady is mentioned when the player tries to pick up a pile of wood when playing with one of the characters, Agent Ray. She refuses to pick up the wood because she isn't a log lady.
