= The Giant (Twin Peaks) =

- Twin Peaks character
- The Giant appears to Agent Cooper in "Episode 16" (1990)
- First appearance: "Episode 8" (1990)
- Last appearance: "Part 17" (2017)
- Created by: David Lynch and Mark Frost
- Portrayed by: Carel Struycken

The Giant is a fictional character from the television series Twin Peaks, created by David Lynch and Mark Frost. He is an enigmatic spirit who appears in visions to Dale Cooper, and gives him clues to help him in his fight against the sinister forces of the Black Lodge. He is portrayed by Carel Struycken.

Struycken also appears in the series' 2017 revival as The Fireman, although the series does not explicitly state whether he and the Giant are the same character. In this series, the Fireman directly collaborates with Cooper in a mission to destroy his evil doppelganger.

== Appearances ==
=== Twin Peaks ===
The Giant appears to FBI agent Dale Cooper in visions, first right after Cooper has been shot in his hotel room. The Giant provides Cooper with clues about the murder of Laura Palmer, alerts Cooper that Laura's killer is in the process of murdering Maddy Ferguson and later confirms the identity of the murderer during a vision in the Roadhouse. Later on, he also warns Cooper that his love-interest Annie Blackburn should not enter the Miss Twin Peaks pageant (her winning the contest is a key element leading to Cooper's entering the Black Lodge and subsequently his downfall).

The Giant apparently inhabits an elderly Room Service Waiter of the Great Northern Hotel (played by Hank Worden). Also, the Giant wears a similar outfit to the Waiter (who in himself is a ghostly semi-conscious entity who almost never appears in a crowd or within the guests rooms of the Great Northern). In the final episode, when Cooper has entered the Black Lodge, both the Waiter and the Giant appear and the latter confirms their identity, stating: "One and the same".

He also appears alongside of the Man from Another Place in the Lodge's waiting room. Some have opined that the waiting room actually is a neutral location between the Black and the White Lodge. In his first appearance, the Giant refused Cooper's question of his whereabouts. In a series of trading cards issued in 1991, The Giant's trading card lists his "Education" as the White Lodge and his "Weaknesses" as "I can only be seen by those who believe."

=== 2017 revival ===
Struycken reappears in the 2017 revival series, but as a character called The Fireman, leaving it ambiguous if he is the same entity as the Giant. Prior to being identified, the character was referred to as ??????? in the ending credits. As in the original series, this character provides cryptic clues to Cooper and appears to have benevolent intentions. Unlike the Giant, however, he does not appear in the natural realm, instead bringing individuals into his own realm, which is depicted as being predominantly without color.

The Fireman's earliest known activity was in 1945 when he created an orb bearing the face of Laura Palmer and had it sent to Earth in response to the Experiment's creation of an orb bearing the face of Killer BOB. Sometime before 2014, he brought Freddie Sykes into his realm, where he told Freddie to buy a gardening glove that would enhance his strength and travel to Twin Peaks. When Sheriff Frank Truman and Deputies Bobby Briggs, Tommy "Hawk" Hill, and Andy Brennan investigate a clue left behind by Major Garland Briggs in 2014, Andy is transported into the Fireman's realm and provided information on important events. The Fireman is last seen after Dale Cooper's doppelgänger travels to his realm, which prompts him to send the doppelgänger to the Twin Peaks Sheriff's Department.

== Cultural references ==
- The Finnish doom metal band Swallow the Sun's song "The Giant" refers to this character. Their album Ghosts of Loss also mentions Laura Palmer in another song.
- "Transmission 3", the final track on DJ Shadow's 1996 album Endtroducing..... samples the voice of the Giant, saying "It is happening again."
- The Giant's words to Cooper in the hotel bedroom are sampled on the ambient album Substrata by Biosphere. The phrase "Sorry to wake you... I forgot to tell you something... The things I tell you will not be wrong..." appears in the song "The Things I Tell You".
- In The Simpsons episode "Lisa's Sax", Homer Simpson is seen watching Twin Peaks in which The Giant is dancing with a white horse. Homer remarks, "Brilliant! I have absolutely no idea what's going on."
- The Psych episode "Dual Spires", which is a homage to Twin Peaks, depicts John DeSantis as a character inspired by the Giant. The character is called the "Seven Foot Tall Man" in the credits.
- The phrase 'it is happening again' appears in the songs "Silver Soul" by American dream pop duo Beach House, and "It's Happening Again" by Agnes Obel.
