= The Man from Another Place =

Character from Twin Peaks

- First appearance: "Episode 2" (1990)
- Last appearance: "Part 18" (2017)
- Created by: David Lynch and Mark Frost
- Portrayed by: Michael J. Anderson (1990–92); Unknown voice actor (2017)

The Man from Another Place (played by Michael J. Anderson), also known as The Little Man From Another Place (LMFAP) or The Arm, is a character from the television series Twin Peaks, created by David Lynch and Mark Frost. He is an inhabitant of the Black Lodge, a realm of pure evil. He was created from MIKE's severed left arm. Early on in the series, The Man gives Agent Dale Cooper clues to apprehending The Man's nemesis, BOB. He later makes recurring appearances in relation to the Black Lodge.

== Twin Peaks (1990–1991) ==
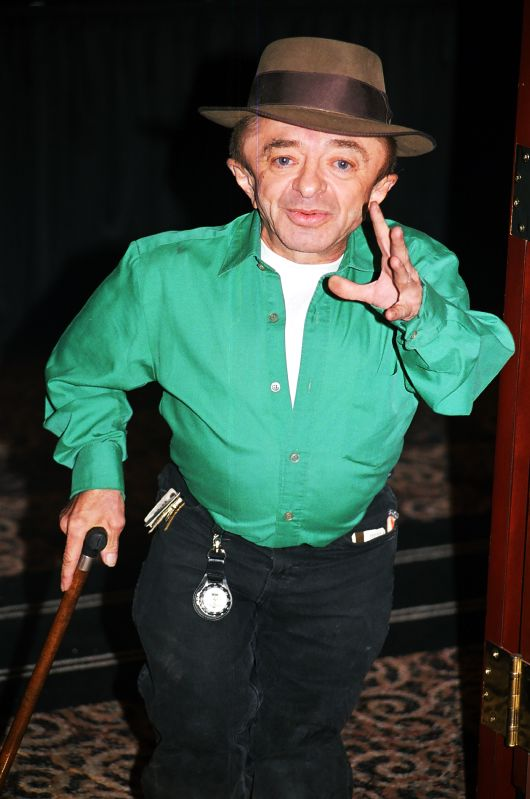
Actor Michael J. Anderson.

The Man from Another Place first appears in the series' third episode, in a dream experienced by Cooper. Although a spirit, he appears to Cooper as a dwarf in a red suit and dress shirt. In the dream, The Man gives Cooper a series of cryptic clues, which ultimately prove helpful in determining the identity of Laura Palmer's killer, The Man's fellow Black Lodge spirit, BOB. One of these clues is a strange 1940s-style jazz dance, a sequence that makes repeated appearances throughout the course of the series. The series never made clear The Man's reasons for wanting to help Cooper, or his true identity.

Following Cooper's dream, The Man appears only a few more times: once with BOB, appearing to Cooper following the death of Josie Packard, and again at the end of the series when Cooper ventures into the Black Lodge.

== Fire Walk with Me (1992) ==
The film Twin Peaks: Fire Walk with Me expands upon the Man from Another Place's identity and his reasons for wanting to help Cooper. It explains that the Man from Another Place is connected to MIKE, the faceless spirit entity who possesses Philip Gerard, the "One Armed Man". The script explicitly states that the Man from Another Place is, in fact, MIKE's severed arm. In the series, the one-armed Gerard tells Cooper a story about having been BOB's partner until he cut off his own arm in an effort to relieve himself of a tattoo on the left shoulder that BOB also had. In Fire Walk With Me, the Man from Another Place tells Cooper, "I am the Arm, and I sound like this." He then makes a whooping noise with his hand and mouth. Later, a similar-sounding siren accompanies the first appearance of Gerard.

At the climax of the film, BOB enters the Black Lodge and stands beside his host, Leland Palmer. The Man From Another Place also appears, standing beside Philip Gerard. At one point, the Man From Another Place puts his hand on Gerard's shoulder, linking the Arm with its owner and making MIKE whole. The Man from Another Place and MIKE then speak in unison to BOB, stating "I want all my garmonbozia" ("pain and sorrow", collected from victims and consumed in the Black Lodge). BOB then removes blood from Leland’s shirt and throws it to the ground. The Man from Another Place is then seen slowly eating creamed corn, interspersed with close-up night vision footage of a monkey staring into the camera, which appears to be the same type of monkey as was earlier shown behind a mask of the type worn by other Lodge spirits (Mrs. Tremond's grandson and the "Jumping Man").

== Twin Peaks: The Return (2017) ==
Attempts to bring Anderson back for the third season broke down over compensation. Instead the character appears as a talking luminescent tree, introduced as "the evolution of the arm". When asked whether the organic mass atop the tree was "a talking brain, pituitary gland, or neuron", Lynch replied, "It's just a head." In the second episode, the tree warns Cooper about its doppelgänger, who appears and attacks Cooper, causing him to fall through the floor of the Black Lodge. In the seventh episode, Cooper has a helpful vision of the tree in plain daylight, while he attempts to disarm a criminal.

== Reverse speech ==
The strange cadence of the Man's dialogue was achieved by having Anderson speak into a recorder. This was then played in reverse, and Anderson was directed to repeat the reversed original. This "reverse-speech" was then reversed again in editing to bring it back to the normal direction, a technique called phonetic reversal. This created the strange rhythm and accentuation that set Cooper's dream world apart from the real world.

Anderson recalls that the phonetic reversal was not difficult to master as, coincidentally, he had used it as a secret language with his junior high school friends. Series creator David Lynch was unaware of this when he cast Anderson in the part, and had hired a trainer to help Anderson with enunciation. When he found out Anderson could already talk backwards, he cancelled the trainer and wrote more difficult lines of dialogue for Anderson to read.
