= Frank Silva =

American set dresser and actor (1950-1995)

- Silva at the Twin Peaks Fan Festival in 1993
- Born: Frank A. Silva; October 31, 1950; Sacramento, California, U.S.
- Died: September 13, 1995 (aged 44); Seattle, Washington, U.S.
- Occupations: Actor, set dresser

Frank A. Silva (October 31, 1950 – September 13, 1995) was an American set dresser and occasional actor best known for his performance as the evil spirit Bob in the TV series Twin Peaks.

== Life and career ==
Born in Sacramento, California, Silva graduated from San Francisco State University with a degree in lighting design, and worked as a prop master and set decorator on several of David Lynch's films, including Dune and Wild at Heart.

While Silva was working as a set dresser on Twin Peaks, Lynch decided to film a scene where Silva was crouched at the foot of Laura Palmer's bed, staring at the camera. Lynch reportedly liked the shot so much that he kept it in the show. While shooting a later scene where Laura Palmer's mother was remembering a traumatic event, camera operator Sean Doyle told Lynch that they had to reshoot the scene because a mirror in the shot had captured Silva's reflection. Lynch instead decided to use the scene, and created the character Bob.

Silva appeared occasionally as Bob for the remainder of the Twin Peaks series and in the 1992 movie Twin Peaks: Fire Walk with Me. His first major appearance was in the International Version of the Twin Peaks pilot, which contained a standalone ending that resolved the mystery of the series and incorporated the accidental footage. He also appeared in the Anthrax video "Only".

== Death ==
After Twin Peaks, Silva went through a period of depression because he couldn't find any acting roles, and eventually became homeless for a period of time before moving in with his mother. He was ultimately placed in a furnished apartment, which was subsidized by the state of Washington.

On September 13, 1995, Silva died from AIDS-related complications at the age of 44. The second episode of the revived Twin Peaks was dedicated to Silva, and he appeared throughout the revival as Bob through use of archival footage.

== Filmography ==
=== As an actor ===
- 1990–1991: Twin Peaks
- 1992: Twin Peaks: Fire Walk with Me
- 1993: Only by Anthrax (music video)
- 2017: Twin Peaks: The Return (archival footage)

=== As prop master and decorator (selection) ===
- 1989: Rosalie Goes Shopping
- 1990: Wild at Heart
- 1992: One False Move
