= Phoebe Augustine =

American actress

- Born: April 1, 1967 (age 59)
- Occupation: Actress

Phoebe Ellen Ceresia (born April 1, 1967), known professionally as Phoebe Augustine, is an American actress known for playing Ronette Pulaski in Twin Peaks.

== Career ==
She portrayed Laura Palmer's friend Ronette Pulaski in several episodes of the original 1990 series Twin Peaks. The pilot episode featured a scene of her walking across train tracks. The image was used widely for promotional and marketing purposes, including on the VHS cover of the original pilot, which was released as a film in Europe. She reprised her role in the 1992 prequel movie Twin Peaks: Fire Walk With Me.

Other roles include the film Plain Clothes (1987) and two notable short-lived sitcoms from the early 1990s: The Elvira Show and Frannie's Turn. Around the same time, she also appeared in the TV drama film Black Widow Murders: The Blanche Taylor Moore Story. She was a musician/singer in the band "Cling".

After a break of many years, she returned to acting in 2017, working again with David Lynch on the Twin Peaks revival, Twin Peaks: The Return, playing "American Girl" in Part 3, a mysterious entity that may or may not be related to her previous role as Ronette.

== Filmography ==
=== Film ===
| Year | Title | Role | Notes |
|---|---|---|---|
| 1987 | Plain Clothes | Girl at Fair #1 | |
| 1992 | Twin Peaks: Fire Walk with Me | Ronette Pulaski | |
| 2014 | Twin Peaks: The Missing Pieces | Ronette Pulaski | |

=== Television ===
| Year | Title | Role | Notes |
|---|---|---|---|
| 1990–1991 | Twin Peaks | Ronette Pulaski | 5 episodes |
| 1992 | Frannie's Turn | Olivia Escobar | 6 episodes |
| 1993 | Black Widow Murders: The Blanche Taylor Moore Story | Cathy | Television film |
| 1993 | The Elvira Show | Paige | Television film |
| 2017 | Twin Peaks | American Girl | Episode: "Part 3" |
