= Bobby Briggs =

Twin Peaks character

- Twin Peaks character
- First appearance: "Pilot" (1990)
- Last appearance: "Part 17" (2017)
- Created by: Mark Frost and David Lynch
- Portrayed by: Dana Ashbrook
- Duration: 1990–1991, 1992, 2017

In-universe information
- Gender: Male
- Occupation: Deputy
- Nationality: American
- Birth date: December 10, 1969 (Note: The Star Pics Twin Peaks trading cards gives his birth as 1972, but The Secret History of Twin Peaks cites that he was 12 years old in July of 1982.)

Bobby Briggs is a fictional main character in the television series Twin Peaks (1990–1991; 2017) and the prequel film Twin Peaks: Fire Walk with Me (1992). He was created by series creators Mark Frost and David Lynch, and is portrayed in all his appearances by Dana Ashbrook.

Bobby is first introduced with a typical "jocky" stereotype, being a drug dealer and always looking for schemes to get money, but he becomes a deputy in the revival series. His plotlines often revolve around him and Shelly Johnson, and his father Garland Briggs who dies between the second season and the revival series.

== Appearances ==
=== In television ===
==== Twin Peaks ====
Bobby Briggs was Laura Palmer's boyfriend and is the first suspect after the police find her body. Laura was secretly seeing James Hurley behind his back, and when told this information, Bobby and his friend Mike Nelson plan to take down James. At the funeral for Laura Palmer, Bobby says that everyone killed her, and charges at James but is restrained by the police and Ed Hurley. In the season 1 finale, Bobby follows James and Donna Hayward to Dr. Jacoby's apartment, where Bobby puts cocaine in James' motorcycle. Bobby called the sheriff's department pretending to be Leo Johnson, telling them to look in James' motorcycle. James would be arrested but would be released upon further inspection, causing the police to realize Bobby had framed him.

Since before Laura Palmer was killed, Bobby was having a secret affair with Shelly Johnson. Shelly and Bobby both worry about Shelly's abusive husband Leo finding out, with Leo getting increasingly suspicious of them throughout the first season. Bobby and Mike both owe Leo $10,000, which Laura had kept in a safety deposit box which they could not access. When getting a football filled with cocaine, Leo tells Bobby that someone has been seeing Shelly behind his back, but does not say who.

Shelly tells Bobby that Leo has been talking to Jacques Renault, and Bobby informs her that they run a drug operation together. Shelly shows Bobby a bloody shirt she found of Leo's, and Bobby takes it and puts it in Jacques apartment to frame him. Shelly gets a gun and shoots Leo, but is worried that Leo is going to get back at her. Bobby then goes to Shelly's house the next day, finding Leo right before he gets shot by Hank Jennings. Bobby catches a glimpse of Hank right before he leaves.

Leo ties Shelly up in the mill fire during the season 1 finale but is rescued by Catherine Martell. Leo becomes paralyzed due to being shot, and Bobby and Shelly agree to live off of disability checks for the paralyzed Leo. Leo, at this time, can only mutter a few words, and says the words "new shoes." Shelly mentions Leo has a pair of boots he had gotten repaired the week before, and Bobby and Mike find a micro-cassette in the boots. The cassette contains Benjamin Horne and Leo planning to burn down the mill. Bobby used this cassette to blackmail Ben to get a job working for him.

During the middle of the second season, Bobby begins working for Ben. Bobby begins having a close relationship with Audrey Horne, distancing himself from Shelly. One night, Leo attacks Shelly, and as Bobby returns home to comfort Shelly, Leo escapes in the woods. Bobby and Shelly tell Cooper and Truman this the next day, to which Bobby finally comes clean about his and Shelly's relationship. Bobby then catches Shelly kissing Gordon Cole and tells Shelly that seeing them kiss made him realize he had been neglecting Shelly and confesses his love for her. During the last few episodes of the second season, Bobby helps Shelly prepare for her Miss Twin Peaks performance.

During the season 2 finale, Bobby and Shelly discuss at the Double R Diner getting married. They worry about where Leo is but conclude that he's probably having the time of his life in the woods. The scene cuts to Leo having his tooth tied up to a cage of spiders, a trap set up by Windom Earle.

==== 2017 revival ====
Twenty-five years after the events of the original series, Bobby becomes a deputy at the Twin Peaks Sheriff's Department. He and Shelly are no longer together, but at some point had a child named Becky Briggs.

During a case where the lawmen sort through old files of Cooper, Bobby spots an old photo of Laura Palmer and starts crying. Bobby then informs Deputy Hawk and Frank Truman that his dad was the last person to see Cooper.

Along with Frank and Hawk, Bobby visits his mother's place, asking about Garland's last meeting with Cooper. Betty gives them a metal container out of a chair, and Bobby remembers that his dad taught him how to open this type of container. Bobby opens it outside, which reveals pages from Garland, instructing them to go to a place named "Jackrabbits Palace." Bobby remembers this place too, saying it's a place he and his dad used to go to in the woods.

After an incident where Becky stole Shelly's car to visit her husband Steven, Bobby and Shelly comfort her at the Double R Diner. Bobby and Shelly both advise Becky she should leave Steven, with Bobby saying that he cannot allow Steven to get away with any more crimes. A gun is suddenly shot through the window, finding that a young boy in a van fired his dad's gun. While waiting for the boy's mother to get her ID out, Bobby goes to the car of a woman who continuously honks her horn, finding a woman frustrated over the traffic, claiming that her daughter is sick.

Bobby led his fellow lawmen to Jackrabbits Palace, following Garland's instructions. They come across an eyeless woman whom they keep in the Sheriff's Department. After a commotion at the sheriff's station, Bobby walks into Frank's office to find Dale Cooper, who told Bobby that Garland was aware of the events that would happen this day.

=== In film ===
The feature film Twin Peaks: Fire Walk with Me details Bobby's role in Laura Palmer's last 7 days before her death. Bobby is unaware that Laura is secretly seeing James at this point, with Laura assuring him that she is seeing no one else. Bobby and Mike discuss how their cocaine supply is getting low, worried that they owe $5,000 to Leo. Bobby calls Leo looking for more cocaine distribution, but Leo refuses. Bobby then calls Jacques, who tells him a supplier he could meet in two days "by the sound of sawing wood."

Bobby and Laura drink in the woods as they meet with this supplier. The supplier shows up, who turns out to be a deputy in Deer Meadow named Cliff Howard. Howard pulls out a gun, and Bobby, panicking, pulls out his own gun and kills Howard. As Bobby frantically tried to bury the man, Laura, being drunk, jokingly insists that he killed Mike, and annoys Bobby with her non-serious attitude.

In the deleted scenes for the film, Twin Peaks: The Missing Pieces, Bobby, still upset about the shooting, tells Laura to hide $10,000 in her safety deposit box. In another scene, Bobby finds out that the supplier's cocaine was actually baby laxative, and informed Laura of the product's true nature.

=== In literature ===
Bobby Briggs is featured in the first Twin Peaks official spin-off book released named The Secret Diary of Laura Palmer. Bobby takes Laura to a party held by Leo Johnson in the book, and soon also started to supply her with cocaine, which she becomes addicted to. After he starts selling drugs for Leo, Bobby and Laura begin their relationship. In April 1987, Bobby began dating Shelly but kept this a secret from Laura.

Bobby is also mentioned in Mark Frost's tie-in books, The Secret History of Twin Peaks and Twin Peaks: The Final Dossier. The books explain that Bobby and Shelly had dated in 1985, but broke up when Bobby cheated on her with Laura. Shelly confronted Bobby about this during prom and met Leo Johnson for the first time that night at the Roadhouse.

== Reception ==
The character of Bobby Briggs has received critical acclaim, especially the characters' dramatic transformation in the revival series. Laura Bradley of Vanity Fair said that of his transformation "in the original Twin Peaks, it was very hard to like the character, a whiny, violent, coke-dealing teen—but in Showtime's revival, he's reformed in the best way possible." Film Crit Hulk of Variety said in response to Dana Ashbrook's performance in Part 11 that "everything about the way Dana Ashbrook plays it rings true to me: the mix of concern and love, the measured attempts not to push too hard, and the constant walking on eggshells, all in hopes that their Becky will find her way "home" to them."
