= Part 17 (Twin Peaks) =

- Twin Peaks episode
- Agent Dale Cooper (Kyle MacLachlan) and Diane Evans (Laura Dern) stand in the Sheriff's station, with Cooper's face superimposed over the scene.
- Episode no.: Season 3 Episode 17
- Directed by: David Lynch
- Written by: David Lynch; Mark Frost
- Cinematography by: Peter Deming
- Editing by: Duwayne Dunham
- Original air date: September 3, 2017
- Running time: 59 minutes

Guest appearances
- Jay Aaseng as Drunk; Dana Ashbrook as Deputy Sheriff Bobby Briggs; Phoebe Augustine as Ronette Pulaski; Chrysta Bell as Special Agent Tammy Preston; Jim Belushi as Bradley Mitchum; Richard Beymer as Benjamin Horne; Joan Chen as Josie Packard; Julee Cruise as herself; Giselle DaMier as Sandie; Eric Da Re as Leo Johnson; Don S. Davis as Major Garland Briggs; Laura Dern as Diane Evans; Jay R. Ferguson as Special Agent Randall Headley; Miguel Ferrer as Special Agent Albert Rosenfield; Robert Forster as Sheriff Frank Truman; Nathan Frizzell as the voice of Phillip Jeffries; Harry Goaz as Deputy Sheriff Andy Brennan; Michael Horse as Deputy Chief Tommy "Hawk" Hill; Robert Knepper as Rodney Mitchum; Piper Laurie as Catherine Martell; Andrea Leal as Mandie; Sheryl Lee as Laura Palmer; David Lynch as FBI Deputy Director Gordon Cole; James Marshall as James Hurley; Don Murray as Bushnell Mullins; Jack Nance as Pete Martell; Walter Olkewicz as Jacques Renault; John Pirruccello as Deputy Sheriff Chad Broxford; Kimmy Robertson as Lucy Brennan; Carlton Lee Russell as Jumping Man; Amy Shiels as Candie; Frank Silva as Killer BOB; Al Strobel as Phillip Michael Gerard / Mike; Carel Struycken as The Fireman; Jake Wardle as Freddie Sykes; Ray Wise as Leland Palmer; Nae Yuuki as Naido; Grace Zabriskie as Sarah Palmer

Episode chronology
← Previous "Part 16"	Next → "Part 18"

"Part 17", also known as "The Past Dictates the Future", (Note: Episodes did not originally air with titles, but the promotional quotes for each episode were later used as titles in the Blu-ray release of this season) is the 17th and penultimate episode of the third season of the American surrealist mystery horror drama television series Twin Peaks. It was written by Mark Frost and David Lynch, directed by Lynch, and stars Kyle MacLachlan. "Part 17" was broadcast on Showtime along with "Part 18" on September 3, 2017, and seen by an audience of 254,000 viewers in the United States. It received widespread critical acclaim, although the narrative direction divided audiences.

== Plot ==
The past dictates the future.

— Dale Cooper (used as a promotional tagline for the episode)

=== Background ===
The small town of Twin Peaks, Washington, has been shocked by the murder of schoolgirl Laura Palmer (Sheryl Lee) and the attempted murder of her friend Ronette Pulaski (Phoebe Augustine). FBI special agent Dale Cooper (Kyle MacLachlan) has been sent to the town to investigate and has discovered that the killer was Laura's father, Leland Palmer (Ray Wise), who acted while possessed by a demonic entity, Killer BOB (Frank Silva). At the end of the original series, Cooper was trapped into the Black Lodge, an extra-dimensional place, by BOB, who let out Cooper's doppelgänger to use him as his physical access to the world.

Twenty-five years after those events, Cooper manages to escape the Lodge through a portal between worlds; during this process, Cooper was supposed to replace the doppelgänger, but instead takes the place of a second doppelgänger, Dougie Jones, fabricated by the first as a decoy for the exchange. Cooper's doppelgänger, exhausted from the process, crashes his car and passes out, allowing the police to capture him; he subsequently manages to escape, dividing his time between his search for access to "the Zone" and organizing his minions' attempts to eliminate the now catatonic Cooper, whom Jones's family and colleagues take for the real Dougie. After numerous attempts, Cooper's doppelgänger is given the coordinates by Diane Evans (Laura Dern), whom he raped in the past and substituted with a "tulpa" (a Lodge-manufactured copy of a human being) at his service; after confessing all this to FBI and redirecting them to the Twin Peaks Sheriff Station, Diane is shot by Agent Albert Rosenfield (Miguel Ferrer) and disposed of in the Lodge by Mike (Al Strobel). In the meantime, Cooper awakens from a self-induced coma in full possession of his mental faculties, and after saying goodbye to Dougie's wife Janey-E (Naomi Watts) and son (Pierce Gagnon), leaves for Twin Peaks.

=== Events ===
In Buckhorn, Gordon Cole (David Lynch) reveals to Tammy Preston (Chrysta Bell) and Albert that 25 years earlier Major Garland Briggs (Don S. Davis) revealed to him and Cooper the existence of an entity initially named "Jowday", then over time renamed "Judy". Agent Phillip Jeffries (originally played by David Bowie) was also aware of Judy's existence, and Cooper warned Gordon to find him in case he disappeared, saying that he was "trying to kill two birds with one stone." Agent Randall Headley (Jay R. Ferguson) calls Gordon, telling him Jones has left the hospital; Bushnell Mullins (Don Murray) reads Dougie's message to Cole: "I am headed for Sheriff Truman's. It is 2:53 in Las Vegas, and that adds up to a ten, the number of completion." Upon hanging up, Gordon expresses confusion as to whether Dougie is Cooper.

At the Great Northern Hotel, the Jackson Hole Police Department informs Benjamin Horne (Richard Beymer) that it has found his brother Jerry (David Patrick Kelly). In the woods outside Twin Peaks, Cooper's doppelgänger reaches the coordinates he received from Diane, the same location where the expedition group found Naido (Nae Yuuki). A portal opens and the doppelgänger is transported to the building above the purple ocean, where he is immediately encaged. In the room are Major Briggs's floating head and the Fireman (Carel Struycken); the screen shows the Palmer house, until the Fireman slowly waves his hand and the location changes to the Twin Peaks Sheriff's station. The cage is moved into the screen through a golden contraption.

Cooper's doppelgänger appears outside the station, where he encounters Deputy Andy Brennan (Harry Goaz). Believing him to be the real Cooper, Andy and Lucy (Kimmy Robertson) welcome the doppelgänger back and introduce him to Sheriff Frank Truman (Robert Forster), the brother of the former sheriff, Harry Truman (Michael Ontkean). After Frank invites the doppelgänger into his office, Andy recalls a vision the Fireman showed him involving him and Lucy and rushes through the corridor. In the cells, Chad Broxford (John Pirruccello) attempts to escape, threatening to shoot Andy when discovered, but Freddie Sykes (Jake Wardle) knocks him unconscious with his green glove. Meanwhile Lucy receives a call, and is startled when the interlocutor identifies himself. She redirects the call to Frank, who is told by the real Cooper that he has almost reached Twin Peaks. Sensing that something is wrong, both Frank and the doppelgänger draw their guns. Before either of them pulls the trigger, however, Lucy shoots the doppelgänger. Andy, James Hurley (James Marshall), Freddie, Naido and Deputy Chief Tommy "Hawk" Hill (Michael Horse) arrive in the office, expressing perplexity at the sight of the doppelgänger's corpse. The room darkens and the woodsmen appear in an attempt to revive the body.

Cooper arrives at the station with Bradley (Jim Belushi) and Rodney Mitchum (Robert Knepper). BOB, in the form of an orb, exits the corpse and starts to attack Cooper. Freddie yells at BOB to get his attention and says "this is my destiny." BOB begins attacking Freddie; Freddie is wounded, but punches the orb repeatedly, breaking it into pieces. Cooper reassures Freddie that he destroyed BOB and proceeds to place the Owl Cave ring on the corpse's left hand's ring finger. The corpse disappears, and the ring reappears in the Black Lodge. Gordon, Tammy and Albert arrive at the station; as Cooper notices Naido, his face appears in superimposition on the screen. Bobby Briggs (Dana Ashbrook) enters the office and asks what is going on; Cooper says that Garland Briggs, Bobby's father, was already aware of the events that are happening in that moment, and reveals that information Garland gathered brought the two of them to form a plan with Gordon. Cooper says that some things will change, and that "the past dictates the future;" he asks Frank to give Harry his regards. Naido approaches Cooper, and when they touch she turns into Diane, who says she remembers everything; the two of them and everyone else in the room turn to look at the clock on the wall, which switches continuously back and forth between 2:52 and 2:53. Cooper's superimposed face says "We live inside a dream" as Cooper in the room expresses his hope to see everyone present again. The room goes dark and the superimposed face disappears.

Cooper, Diane and Gordon walk through the Great Northern's furnace room, hearing a continuous hum. Cooper unlocks a door using his old room key. Before he proceeds, he asks Diane and Gordon not to follow him inside and says he'll see Diane "at the curtain call." Cooper meets Mike, who recites the "Fire Walk with Me" chant. They are transported to the Dutchman's and encounter Phillip Jeffries (voiced by Nathan Frizzell), enclosed in a bell-shaped steam-spouting machine. Cooper asks Phillip about the date February 23, 1989, which Jeffries promises to find in the place he's in. Jeffries says that it's good to see Cooper again, and tells him to say hello to Gordon, who will remember "the unofficial version." He tells him that there he will find Judy, and warns him that someone will be there; he asks if Cooper asked him "this," after which the figure engraved in the Owl cave and on the ring comes out of the steam. The figure breaks in three parts and reconstitutes in a number 8, which turns on itself; a brown point on the figure travels from one side of the number to the other. Jeffries enjoins Cooper to "remember;" Mike says, "electricity", and Cooper is transported out of the room.

On February 23, 1989, James Hurley drives Laura Palmer into the woods on his motorbike. Cooper appears and watches them from behind a tree. Laura breaks up with James, and after he drives away, goes to meet Leo Johnson (Eric Da Re), Ronette Pulaski and Jacques Renault (Walter Olkewicz) for an orgy, but encounters Cooper before reaching them. Recognizing him from her dreams, she takes his hand. Cooper leads her through the woods and tells her they are going home. On February 24, 1989, Pete Martell (Jack Nance) goes fishing but Laura's corpse is not visible. (Note: An earlier shot showed Laura's plastic-wrapped corpse fading away, leaving the lake shore behind it. When Martell goes fishing, the shot mimics the pilot, but Laura's corpse is not present.) In the present, in the Palmer house, Sarah Palmer (Grace Zabriskie) wails and tries to break her daughter's portrait.

While guiding Laura through the woods, Cooper suddenly hears the strange scratching noise behind him. When he turns towards the sound, Laura disappears. Confused, Cooper looks for her for a moment. Her screams echo through the woods. The scene fades to Julee Cruise singing "The World Spins", accompanied by Chromatics.

== Production ==
"Part 17", like the rest of the limited series, was written by Mark Frost and David Lynch and directed by Lynch. Frost had already written ten episodes of the original series—the "Pilot" and Episodes 1, 2 and 8 with Lynch, plus Episodes 5, 7, 12, 14, 16, 26 and the original series finale, Episode 29. Lynch also directed six episodes of the original series—the "Pilot", "Episode 2", "Episode 8", "Episode 9", "Episode 14" and "Episode 29". Footage from the "Pilot" episode and the 1992 film Twin Peaks: Fire Walk with Me is used in the episode; some scenes from the pilot were edited to delete Laura's corpse, while the only modification made to the film excerpts was to eliminate the soundtrack and color-grade them in black and white. The episode is dedicated to the memory of Jack Nance, who appears in its archival footage.

=== Music ===
American dream pop singer Julee Cruise performs her song "The World Spins", accompanied by Chromatics, at the end. The preceding scene, in which Cooper leads Laura through the woods, is underscored by Angelo Badalamenti's track "Laura Palmer's Theme", a staple of the series.

== Reception ==
"Part 17" received widespread critical acclaim. On Rotten Tomatoes, the episode received a 95% rating based on 22 reviews. The critics' consensus reads: "This penultimate chapter provides a soothing dose of closure to loyal fans with a rat-a-tat of crowd-pleasing payoffs before embarking on one last, foreboding journey."

Writing for IndieWire, Hanh Nguyen awarded the episode an "A," theorizing that because "the ghostly overlay of Cooper's face fills the screen as the action plays out", "the entire season up to this point" is "inside of his dream" and writing, "the dream was sweet while it lasted." She called the finale as a whole a "brilliant and no doubt controversial ending for a show that had come back after 25 years to leave fans wanting yet again." In her similarly positive review of the episode, The A.V. Club's Emily L. Stephens gave the episode an "A−", writing that it "sets itself up as the answer to the questions Twin Peaks poses," and that the battle scene at the sheriff's station "highlights the futility of relying on traditional story structure in telling a tale as abstract and enigmatic as this."

The New York Times' Noel Murray gave the episode a positive review, saying that he "personally loved" it and calling certain scenes "pure televised poetry," while recognizing some validity to the fans' annoyance over its "elliptical nature". In his recap for Entertainment Weekly, Jeff Jensen favorably compared the episode and its successor to Lynch's Lost Highway, praising the series as Lynch's "do-over at a big saga fantasy, produced at a length and rich with the poetic abstraction that he couldn't get from a Hollywood feature film."
