= Tommy Hill (Twin Peaks) =

Fictional character in TV series Twin Peaks

Tommy "Hawk" Hill
- Twin Peaks character
- Michael Horse as Tommy "Hawk" Hill in Twin Peaks: The Missing Pieces.
- First appearance: "Pilot" (1990)
- Last appearance: "Part 17" (2017)
- Created by: David Lynch and Mark Frost
- Portrayed by: Michael Horse
- Duration: 1990–1991, 2017

In-universe information
- Gender: Male
- Occupation: Chief deputy
- Birth date: September 16, 1950

Tommy "Hawk" Hill, better known as Deputy Hawk, is a fictional character in the television series Twin Peaks (1990–2017), created by Mark Frost and David Lynch. He appears in both seasons of the show, the 2017 revival series, as well as deleted scenes for the prequel film, Twin Peaks: The Missing Pieces.

Played by Michael Horse, the deputy is nicknamed "Hawk" due to his tracking skills, which extend beyond animal and human tracks to those of cars and trucks. Hawk is aware of the many spiritual elements in the show, being the first person to verbally explain what the Black and White Lodges are, as well as having a prominent part in discovering Dale Cooper's disappearance in the revival.

== Appearances ==
=== In television ===
==== Twin Peaks ====
Hawk is at first a deputy of the Twin Peaks Sheriff's Station, helping to solve the murder of Laura Palmer. Due to his excellent tracking skills, he is able to track down the one-armed man for questioning in Laura Palmer's murder, as well as Bob. He finds no information on the latter, giving evidence that Bob is an interdimensional entity.

Hawk, Harry S. Truman, and "Big" Ed Hurley enroll Cooper into the Bookhouse Boys, a secret society in Twin Peaks. They explain to Cooper that someone has been smuggling cocaine into town, which we later learn is three people, known as the Renault brothers.

During the second season, Hawk saves Cooper and Truman from a guard at the brothel One Eyed Jacks, while saving Audrey Horne. When Cooper leaves Twin Peaks before being stopped by Roger Hardy, Cooper tells Hawk that if he ever gets lost, he would hope that Hawk would be the one to find him. In the following episode, Cooper asks Hawk what the Black and White Lodges are, as Hawk explains that every spirit must past through the Black Lodge, the shadow-self of the White Lodge, to get to the White Lodge, saying that his people call it "The Dweller on the Threshold." Hawk then helps arrest Jean Renault during a successful sting operation, concluding the Bookhouse Boys' suspicions of drugs running into Twin Peaks.

==== 2017 revival ====
Twenty-five years after the events of the original series, Hawk was promoted to Deputy Chief in the Twin Peaks Sheriff's Department. He gets a call from the Log Lady, saying that something is missing relating to Cooper, who has been missing since the season 2 finale, and that he would find it using his heritage. Hawk and the rest of the lawmen in Twin Peaks sort through old files of Cooper's case on Laura Palmer, hoping what the Log Lady deemed as missing.

While in the restroom, Hawk notices a screw missing from the stall door's panelling after dropping a coin. He gets a step ladder and pulls back the panelling with a crowbar, finding missing diary pages from Laura Palmer. Hawk and Frank Truman examine the diary pages in the following episode, which explain Laura's dream of Annie Blackburn in the prequel film Fire Walk with Me, giving them insight on the possibility of there being two different Cooper's.

After finding out that Garland Briggs was the last person to see Cooper before his disappearance, Hawk, Frank, and Bobby Briggs meet with Betty Briggs, the mother of Bobby and Garland's husband. She gives them a metallic container that when opened reveals pages of instructions to go to a place named "Jackrabbits Palace." The Log Lady informs Hawk about this place, telling him "there's fire where you are going." Hawk shows Frank an ancient map which Hawk believes relates to Jackrabbits Palace, showing Frank a symbol of fire believing it is the same fire that the Log Lady was referring to. The lawmen eventually go to Jackrabbits Palace, finding an eyeless woman whom they keep in the Sheriff's Department.

Hawk and the Log Lady continue to communicate throughout the rest of the series, with Hawk being the last person to talk to the Log Lady before she passes away in Part 15. Hawk informs Frank, Andy, and Lucy of the Log Lady's passing, with Lucy breaking into tears.

=== In film ===
Hawk is not present in the prequel film Twin Peaks: Fire Walk with Me, but is featured very briefly in the deleted scenes for the movie, which was released as Twin Peaks: The Missing Pieces. Hawk informs Truman and Andy that Bernie has come into Twin Peaks from Canada, continuing their investigation at the time of the Renault brothers bringing cocaine into Twin Peaks.

=== In literature ===
During the second season of Twin Peaks, Simon & Schuster's Pocket Books division released three official tie-in books, with Hawk being mentioned in the third book that was released at the time, Welcome to Twin Peaks: An Access Guide to the Town. The book gives confirmation on his birth date, zodiac sign, and names him as the 74th player at Twin Peaks High School in 1968, playing as halfback and being named the "hero of the undefeated season."

Hawk is also mentioned in Mark Frost's official tie-in book The Secret History of Twin Peaks. It explains how his nickname "Hawk" was given to him by Frank Truman, although Hawk was initially resentful of this nickname. Hawk served time in the Vietnam War after high school, and became a deputy shortly after returning to Twin Peaks.

== Reception ==
The character has received praise from both critics and fans alike. Writer Sean T. Collins of Rolling Stone praised the diverse nature of the character, stating that Hawk is "one who can track anything that moves, kill a man with a hatchet at a distance of 20 yards, piece together the supernatural goings-on surrounding Laura Palmer's murder, powwow with members of the local benevolent White Lodge and its "shadow self" the Black Lodge, and date a nice veterinarian with a degree from Brandeis. That's Deputy "Hawk" Hill. Best of all, though he knows the lore, he's no shaman stereotype. Hill is the one Twin Peaks character you wish they made an action figure for."

Michael Horse was met with critical acclaim for his performance in Part 15. Jeff Jensen of Entertainment Weekly wrote for the episode that he was "struck by Hawk's attentive silence and active listening, receiving her final testimony like a bedside priest and wishing her farewell." Matt Fowler of IGN wrote that Horse was "excellent, bringing stoic weight to Margaret's kindness and fear."
