= List of Twin Peaks characters =

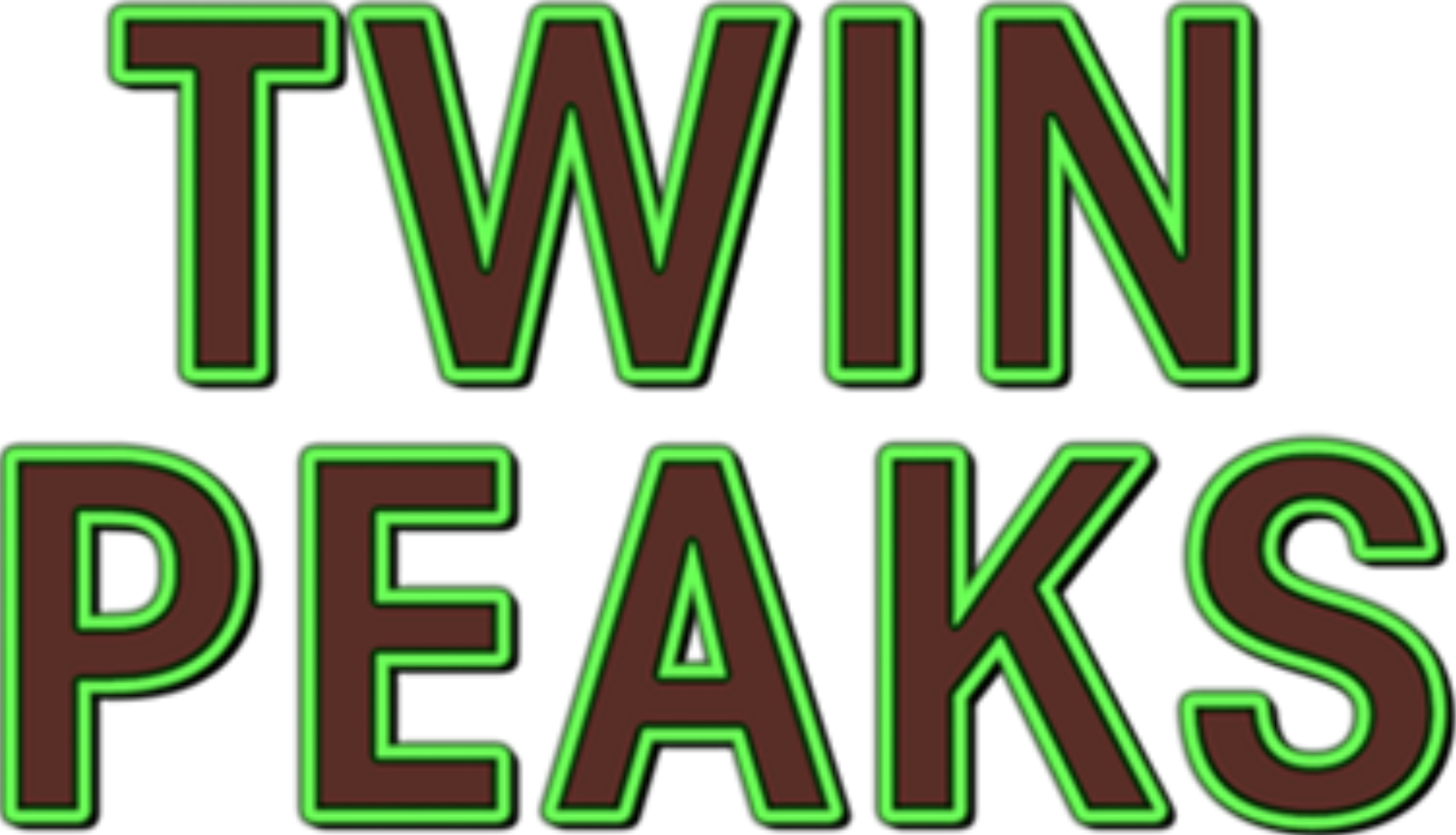

The following is an incomplete list of characters from the television series Twin Peaks, the film Twin Peaks: Fire Walk with Me, and the 2017 revival.

== Overview ==
Actor	Character	Season			
Actor	Character	1	2	FWWM	3
Main
Kyle MacLachlan	Dale Cooper	Main	Main	Starring	Main
Michael Ontkean	Harry S. Truman	Main	Main		
Mädchen Amick	Shelly Johnson	Main	Main	Starring	Recurring
Dana Ashbrook	Bobby Briggs	Main	Main	Starring	Recurring
Richard Beymer	Benjamin Horne	Main	Main		Recurring
Lara Flynn Boyle	Donna Hayward	Main	Main		
Moira Kelly	Donna Hayward			Starring	
Sherilyn Fenn	Audrey Horne	Main	Main		Recurring
Warren Frost	Will Hayward	Main	Main		Guest
Peggy Lipton	Norma Jennings	Main	Main	Starring	Recurring
James Marshall	James Hurley	Main	Main	Starring	Recurring
Everett McGill	Ed Hurley	Main	Main		Recurring
Wendy Robie	Nadine Hurley	Main	Main		Recurring
Jack Nance	Pete Martell	Main	Main		Archive
Ray Wise	Leland Palmer	Main	Main	Main	Recurring
Joan Chen	Josie Packard	Main	Main		Archive
Piper Laurie	Catherine Martell	Main	Main		Archive
Kimmy Robertson	Lucy Moran	Recurring	Main		Recurring
Sheryl Lee	Laura Palmer	Starring	Starring	Main	Recurring
Sheryl Lee	Maddy Ferguson	Starring	Starring		
Sheryl Lee	Carrie Page				Guest
Starring
Russ Tamblyn	Lawrence Jacoby	Starring	Starring		Recurring
Eric Da Re	Leo Johnson	Starring	Starring	Starring	Archive
Don S. Davis	Garland Briggs	Starring	Starring	Starring	
Chris Mulkey	Hank Jennings	Starring	Starring		
Mary Jo Deschanel	Eileen Hayward	Starring (Note: Credited as Starring in the pilot episode only.)	Recurring		
Harry Goaz	Andy Brennan	Starring	Starring		Recurring
Gary Hershberger	Mike Nelson	Starring	Recurring	Guest	Guest
Michael Horse	Tommy "Hawk" Hill	Starring	Starring		Recurring
Grace Zabriskie	Sarah Palmer	Starring	Recurring	Starring	Recurring
Kenneth Welsh	Windom Earle		Starring		
Phoebe Augustine	Ronette Pulaski	Recurring	Recurring	Starring	Guest (Note: Credited as "American Girl".)
David Bowie (Note: Jeffries is voiced by Nathan Frizzell in season 3, in both archive scenes featuring Bowie and new appearances.)	Phillip Jeffries			Starring	Archive
David Duchovny	Denise Bryson		Starring		Recurring
Miguel Ferrer	Albert Rosenfield	Recurring	Recurring	Starring	Recurring
Pamela Gidley	Teresa Banks			Starring	
Heather Graham	Annie Blackburn		Recurring	Starring	
Chris Isaak	Chester Desmond			Starring	
David Lynch	Gordon Cole	Guest	Recurring	Starring	Recurring
Jürgen Prochnow	Woodsman			Starring	
Harry Dean Stanton	Carl Rodd			Starring	Recurring
Kiefer Sutherland	Sam Stanley			Starring	
Lenny Von Dohlen	Harold Smith		Recurring	Starring	

== Supernatural/otherworldly ==
=== Bob ===
Frank Silva was a set decorator who worked on the pilot episode. One day, when he was moving furniture in Laura Palmer's bedroom, a woman warned Silva not to get locked in the room. The image of Silva trapped in the room sparked something in Lynch, who then asked Silva if he was an actor. Silva said yes, and Lynch told him that he had a role in mind for him on the series. Silva accepted, and Lynch shot footage of him behind Laura's bed with no real idea of what he would do with it.

Silva's reflection was accidentally caught in the footage of Sarah Palmer's frightening vision at the end of the pilot. Sarah sees a hand uncovering Laura's heart necklace from the ground, and Silva can be seen in the mirror behind her head. Lynch was made aware of this accident and decided to keep Silva in the scene.

=== Mike ===
Mike made his appearance in the pilot episode which was only originally intended to be a "kind of homage to The Fugitive. The only thing he was gonna do was be in this elevator and walk out." However, when Lynch wrote the "fire walk with me" speech, he imagined Mike saying it in the basement of the Twin Peaks hospital – a scene that would appear in an alternative version of the pilot episode, and surface later in Agent Cooper's dream sequence. Mike's alias, Phillip Michael Gerard, is also a reference to Lieutenant Phillip Gerard, a character in The Fugitive.

=== The Man from Another Place ===
Lynch met Michael J. Anderson in 1987. After seeing him in a short film, Lynch wanted to cast him in the title role in Ronnie Rocket, but the project ultimately fell through. While editing the alternate ending of the international version of the pilot episode, an idea occurred to Lynch on his way home one day: "I was leaning against a car—the front of me was leaning against this very warm car. My hands were on the roof and the metal was very hot. The Red Room scene leapt into my mind. 'Little Mike' was there, and he was speaking backwards... For the rest of the night I thought only about The Red Room."

== FBI/DEA ==
=== Special Agent Dale Cooper ===
Special Agent Dale Cooper, played by Kyle MacLachlan, is the protagonist of the series. An FBI agent who arrives in Twin Peaks in 1989 to investigate the brutal murder of popular high-school student Laura Palmer, Cooper falls in love with the town and gains a great deal of acceptance within the tightly knit community. He has an array of quirky, whimsical mannerisms, such as giving a "thumbs up" when satisfied, sage-like sayings (often inspired by his fascination with Tibet), and a distinctive sense of humor, along with his love for cherry pie and "a damn fine cup of coffee".

One of his most popular habits is recording messages containing everyday observations and abstract thoughts on his current case to his (until season 3) unseen secretary, Diane, into a microcassette recorder he carries. His investigative techniques go far beyond the FBI's usual ones, including intuitive exercises and dream analysis. He becomes deeply involved with the inhabitants of Twin Peaks and remains in town after the resolution of the Laura Palmer case, especially once his nemesis and former partner Windom Earle starts menacing the town in order to exploit its supernatural properties.

=== Albert Rosenfield ===
Albert Rosenfield, played by Miguel Ferrer, is a talented forensic analyst Cooper calls in to assist on the Laura Palmer case. An inaugural member of the Blue Rose Task Force, he is, by 2014, the only member who has not disappeared under mysterious circumstances. His abrasive and mocking personality alienates the Twin Peaks sheriff's department relatively quickly; he compares Andy to a dog and repeatedly insults Sheriff Harry S. Truman to the point where Truman punches him. He also fights with Doc Hayward and harshly disparages the local police and medical facilities, showing respect only to his FBI colleagues, at least at first.

A later appearance, and another conflict with Truman, lead to an emotional moment where Rosenfield exposes a pacifist nature seemingly at odds with his acerbic surface persona, to the sheriff's shock. Albert returns to Twin Peaks after the murder of Laura's cousin Maddy Ferguson and is visibly affected by the crime; he is present when Killer BOB's identity is revealed, leading to a moment when he discusses with Cooper, Truman, and Major Briggs the nature of the evil they have confronted.

Albert warms up to the townsfolk as the series progresses, going so far as to hug Truman when returning once more to assist in their hunt for Windom Earle, but does not lose his sharp and sardonic manner.

Albert has a minor role in Fire Walk With Me, appearing in the FBI offices with Cole during the reappearance of Phillip Jeffries, and later as a skeptical listener of Cooper's seeming premonition about the next victim.

He also appears briefly in The Autobiography of F.B.I. Special Agent Dale Cooper: My Life, My Tapes, under the entry recorded on February 4, 1977. It is implied that this is Cooper's and his first meeting. This makes Albert 21 when the two first meet, according to the My Life, My Tapes canon.

After Cooper's doppelgänger is arrested in South Dakota in 2016, Albert investigates his apparent reappearance, alongside Cole and Tamara Preston. He later discloses to Cole that he was apparently contacted by Jeffries, which resulted in the death of an agent stationed in Colombia. Albert, along with Cole, also convinces Diane Evans, Cooper's former secretary, to speak to the doppelgänger, after which Diane confirms the incarcerated man is not the real Cooper.

Albert later participates in the investigation of an apparent double homicide, also in South Dakota, after a headless corpse bearing Major Briggs's fingerprints is found with the severed head of high school librarian Ruth Davenport. During the investigation, Albert begins to form a relationship with Constance Talbot, the local police department's coroner.

=== Chester Desmond ===
Chester Desmond, played by Chris Isaak in Fire Walk with Me, is a taciturn FBI Special Agent who is called out by his boss, Regional Bureau Chief Gordon Cole, to investigate the murder of 17-year-old Teresa Banks, who was found wrapped in plastic. Desmond is introduced to his new partner, Special Agent Sam Stanley, and receives coded clues in the form of Lil the Dancer. Desmond and Stanley begin their investigation by driving to a rural town called Deer Meadow.

A few days into the investigation, Desmond mysteriously disappears after picking up a ring later seen to be owned by the Man from Another Place. His disappearance is reported to Cole, who then dispatches Special Agent Dale Cooper to pick up where Desmond left off. Desmond's disappearance is never explained, although Cooper discovers that Desmond's car has been vandalized with the words "LET'S ROCK", the same words spoken by the Man from Another Place when he introduces himself, implying that Desmond was taken to the Black Lodge.

Desmond is briefly mentioned in the 2017 series, where he is revealed to have been one of the inaugural members of the Blue Rose Task Force, alongside Cooper, Phillip Jeffries, and Albert Rosenfield.

=== FBI Special Agent Sam Stanley ===
FBI Special Agent Sam Stanley, played by Kiefer Sutherland, assists Special Agent Desmond in the investigation of the murder of Teresa Banks. Gordon Cole mentions that he cracked the Whitman case. He is portrayed as being somewhat stiff and inflexible, in contrast to the laid-back demeanor of Desmond; at one point, Desmond manages to make Stanley spill coffee on himself when he asks what time it is (noticing that Stanley is holding his cup with his watch hand).

Stanley was mentioned in the series pilot, during the scene in which Agent Cooper is examining Laura Palmer's body. He speaks into his dictaphone: "Give this to Albert and his team; don't go to Sam; Albert seems to have a little more on the ball."

=== Phillip Jeffries ===
Phillip Jeffries, played by David Bowie in Fire Walk with Me and voiced by Nathan Frizzell in the 2017 series, is an FBI agent who disappeared for years studying paranormal and supernatural happenings. In Fire Walk with Me, Jeffries suddenly exits an elevator in the Philadelphia FBI office, two years after his disappearance. He hurries to the office of his former superior, Gordon Cole, and starts raving in a loud and disturbed manner, referring at one stage to Special Agent Dale Cooper and yelling "Who do you think this is, there?"

Jeffries then narrates where he has been since his disappearance. He mentions names and incidents unfamiliar to those listening. His words are illustrated by the intrusion of a ghost transmission depicting a small group of characters, including the Man from Another Place and BOB, in a series of strange rooms. He disappears into thin air once again after announcing "I found something... and then there they were!"

Jeffries is frequently mentioned in the 2017 series, which reveals that he was the original leader of the Blue Rose Task Force and was involved in the first case, alongside Cole. An unseen individual identifying as him assigns Ray Monroe to kill Cooper's doppelgänger. Albert Rosenfield also informs Cole that he was contacted by an individual claiming to be Jeffries, which led to the killing of an agent stationed in Colombia. Cole later re-experiences Jeffries' sudden reappearance in a dream and remembers Jeffries' comment about Cooper, implying that Cooper may have been an imposter.

With the 2016 death of Bowie, Jeffries is depicted as a grey orb beside a giant steaming kettle in a room above the convenience store. Cooper's doppelgänger approaches it, after receiving info on his whereabouts from Ray Monroe. In "Part 17", the real Cooper encounters Jeffries to access an alternate 1989 in an attempt to rescue Laura Palmer.

=== Gordon Cole ===
Gordon Cole (Note: named for a minor character in Sunset Boulevard), played by David Lynch, is a Regional Bureau Chief in the FBI and Agent Cooper's immediate superior. He is very hard of hearing (wearing large hearing aids) and thus speaks very loudly. He often misunderstands what is said to him and replies with comically inappropriate responses. Cole's coded messages sometimes baffle even his closest colleagues. In the first episode in which he appears, he says, "Cooper, you remind me today of a small Mexican chihuahua" (which he pronounces "chee-WOW-wow"). The conversation continues as normal, with the issue remaining unsolved.

While in Twin Peaks, Cooper and Cole go to the Double R Diner where he is smitten by waitress Shelly Johnson, whom he apparently can hear perfectly well. Shelly, being ignored by her boyfriend Bobby Briggs at the time, is shocked yet pleased by his attention, and upon Cole's imminent departure, they share a kiss, to the chagrin of Bobby, who happens to show up at that moment.

At the beginning of Fire Walk With Me, Cole briefs agents Chester Desmond and Sam Stanley on their assignment to investigate the murder of Teresa Banks. Cole uses a coded language, in the attire and gestures of Lil the Dancer, to inform the agents of what to expect in their investigation. Cole describes the Banks murder case as one of his "blue rose" cases. The 2017 series reveals that "blue rose" refers to the Blue Rose Task Force, which investigates cases, particularly those involving apparent doppelgängers, that cannot be rationally explained. Cole and Phillip Jeffries investigated the first "blue rose" case, where a woman was killed by another woman who looked exactly like her, and uttered the phrase before her body disappeared.

By 2016, Cole has become the FBI Deputy Director, and obtains improved hearing aids, resulting in fewer instances of him misunderstanding others. When at their maximum volume, Cole is able to speak quietly and hold private conversations, although he only occasionally raises the volume of the aids as loud noises hurt his ears. After Cooper's doppelgänger is arrested in South Dakota, Cole leads the investigation alongside Albert Rosenfield and Tamara Preston. The trio later take part in another case in South Dakota when a headless corpse found in the area is found to have Major Garland Briggs's fingerprints.

=== Denise Bryson ===
Denise Bryson, played by David Duchovny, is a DEA agent. A trans woman, Bryson first wore women's clothing during a DEA undercover operation and found that it relaxed her. Formerly named Dennis, she changed her name to Denise for the purpose of the operation and retained it afterward, finding it comfortable.

Bryson comes to Twin Peaks when the Mounties and the FBI accuse Dale Cooper of misfeasance for his handling of the rescue of Audrey Horne from One Eyed Jacks and the alleged theft of cocaine from an RCMP stakeout. Cooper quickly determines that the Mountie accusing him is himself involved in drug dealing with Jean Renault and Hank Jennings. This leads to the standoff at Dead Dog Farm, in which Bryson uses her femininity to effect Cooper's rescue.

25 years later, Bryson leaves the DEA and becomes the FBI Chief of Staff. It is implied that her presence in the agency made other agents uncomfortable, but they were berated by Gordon Cole, for which Bryson remains grateful to Cole. Bryson also comes to fully embrace her female identity. After the arrest of Cooper's doppelgänger, she approves Cole's investigation into the matter, although she questions Cole bringing along Tammy Preston.

=== Tamara "Tammy" Preston ===
Tamara Preston, also known by her nickname Tammy, is an FBI agent introduced in the novel The Secret History of Twin Peaks, in which Gordon Cole assigns her to investigate a dossier recovered from Major Garland Briggs. She makes her first physical appearance in the 2017 series, played by Chrysta Bell. Preston joins Cole and Albert Rosenfield into their investigation of Dale Cooper's apparent reappearance after his doppelgänger is arrested in South Dakota. During the investigation, she discovers that one of the doppelgänger's fingerprints is a reverse of the real Cooper's print. Afterward, Preston takes part in investigating an apparent double homicide in South Dakota where the severed head of librarian Ruth Davenport is found with a headless body bearing Garland Briggs's fingerprints, and interrogates murder suspect William Hastings.

In addition to the South Dakota cases, Preston leads the FBI's investigation into the deaths of Sam Colby and Tracey Barberato in New York City and finds that Cooper's doppelgänger was spotted at the penthouse where the couple was found dead. Her work earns praise from Cole and Rosenfield, who have her join the Blue Rose Task Force.

=== Diane Evans ===
Diane Evans is Dale Cooper's secretary in the FBI. She is featured in the original series as an unseen character, receiving recordings addressed to her from Cooper that he creates during his investigations.

Diane makes her first physical appearance in the 2017 series, played by Laura Dern. She travels to South Dakota at the behest of Gordon Cole to speak to Cooper's doppelgänger after his arrest, and confirms that the doppelgänger is not the real Cooper. Against her wishes, Diane then joins Cole, Albert Rosenfield, and Tamara Preston in investigating a headless body bearing Major Garland Briggs's fingerprints, due to Briggs' connection with Cooper. However, Diane is later shown to be corresponding with the doppelgänger, leaving her true loyalties unclear. Cole and Rosenfield learn of Diane's correspondence, but choose to keep her close, and have her deputized during the investigation.

Ultimately, it is revealed that the Diane participating in the investigation is a tulpa of the real Diane, who was created by the doppelgänger. On the doppelgänger's orders, she attempts to kill the FBI team, but is gunned down by Rosenfield and Preston. Her body promptly disappears after her death and her spirit is destroyed in the Black Lodge.

Initially, the fate of the real Diane is unknown, although the tulpa says that she was raped by the doppelgänger and taken to the convenience store where supernatural entities converge. The tulpa also says that Diane is the estranged half-sister of Janey-E Jones, who married the decoy Cooper replaces in his return to the natural realm.

The real Diane is revealed to be trapped in the body of Naido in "Part 17". She sees another doppelgänger of herself in "Part 18" and, after traveling in a car with Cooper and having sex with him in a motel, she leaves him a note, calling him Richard and herself Linda, then disappears.

=== Lil the Dancer ===
Lil the Dancer (Kimberly Ann Cole)

Lil the Dancer (Kimberly Ann Cole) is seen only in Fire Walk with Me. Her movements and clothing are code; this is an FBI method devised by Cole to quickly and covertly brief Special Agent Desmond on what to expect during his investigation into the death of Teresa Banks.

== Twin Peaks Sheriff's Department ==
=== Harry S. Truman ===
Harry S. Truman (played by Michael Ontkean) is Twin Peaks' sheriff, who assists Special Agent Dale Cooper in the investigation of the murder of Laura Palmer. Harry is in love with the owner of the Packard Sawmill, Josie Packard, and is also one of the Bookhouse Boys.

Harry and Cooper hit it off from the start. Harry is down-to-earth and plain-spoken, which often sharply contrasts with the eccentric Cooper and his unconventional methods of policing, fascination with Tibet, dreams, etc. Harry regards Cooper as somewhat eccentric but well-meaning. In early episodes, Harry serves to introduce Cooper (and hence the viewer) to the more prominent residents of Twin Peaks. Harry states that he begins to feel that he is Dr. Watson to Cooper's Sherlock Holmes. Despite their differences, Truman represents a literary alternate to Cooper: they approach the same goal through different means.

As the case progress, Harry's respect for Cooper (and vice versa) grows and the two become close friends. He regards Cooper as "the finest lawman he has ever known". He vehemently defends Cooper to the FBI when Cooper is suspended for allegedly trafficking drugs across the Canada–US border, and assists him in rescuing Audrey Horne from One-Eyed Jacks.

Harry shares his name with Harry S. Truman, the 33rd president of the United States. A picture of President Truman appears in his office. Additionally, a stuffed and mounted buck's head on his office wall has a placard reading "The Buck Stopped Here" hanging from it, a reference to the famous "The buck stops here" sign President Truman put on his desk.

Harry's passionate love for Josie Packard is such that it blinds him to the fact that she is keeping secrets from him, many of which regard her past and her history with her husband. When she dies suddenly after murdering Thomas Eckhardt, Harry falls into a deep depression and takes to drinking. He manages to turn himself around when Eckhardt's personal assistant Jones makes an attempt to murder him, which he thwarts.

Following this, Harry resumes being the dedicated partner to Cooper he was before. When Cooper disappears into the Black Lodge Harry tirelessly waits for hours, until his sudden reappearance.

By 2016, Harry is affected by terminal cancer, which leads to him relinquishing his title as sheriff. His duties are assumed by his older brother Frank, who comes out of retirement after a prior tenure as Twin Peaks sheriff. When the restored Cooper later meets Frank Truman at the Sheriff's Station, after Bob's defeat, he tells Frank to send Harry his best wishes.

=== Andy Brennan ===
Andy Brennan, played by Harry Goaz, is a deputy in the Twin Peaks sheriff's department. Andy is a bit slow-witted and very sensitive, tending to cry at murder scenes. He is also very loyal and trustworthy, prompting Albert Rosenfield to compare him, disparagingly, to a dog. Andy has been seeing the secretary of the sheriff's department, Lucy Moran, but she has grown tired of him and seeks adventure by seeing Dick Tremayne. Andy is initially jealous of Dick's relationship with his former girlfriend, but the two later bond over Dick's temporary foster son Nicky. Not much is revealed of Andy during the show, except through physical comedy, such as his inadequacy at handling guns and sticky tape. However, Andy improves his gun skills at the range, later shooting Jacques Renault when he tries to go for Sheriff Truman.

Andy recognizes that the cave drawing is a map, and he therefore plays a big part in FBI agent Dale Cooper's finding his way to the Black Lodge.

In the international pilot, he is revealed as a trumpeter, albeit not a very good one. He has a talent for drawing, which is demonstrated when he sketches Bob from Sarah Palmer's vision and again during the trial of Leland Palmer when he sketches the back of Leland's head.

Following the events of the original series, Andy marries Lucy and they raise their son Wally together. When Deputy Chief Hawk receives an ominous clue from Margaret Lanterman in 2016, he attempts to help Hawk solve the clue, but is unable to do so. Andy later investigates the death of a boy killed by Richard Horne in a hit-and-run incident.

=== Tommy "Hawk" Hill ===
Deputy Tommy "Hawk" Hill, played by Michael Horse. Born in 1951, he works at the Twin Peaks sheriff's department under Sheriff Harry S. Truman. He is a Native American, but it is not made clear to which nation he belongs, although during a discussion as to whether or not Tommy believes in the soul he references Blackfoot Indian mysticism to Special Agent Dale Cooper. He is usually referred to as "Hawk" because of his excellent tracking skills, which extend beyond animal and human tracks to those of cars and trucks. Hawk is also at one point shown to be a skilled knife-thrower. He is clearly aware of the supernatural presence in the woods of Twin Peaks and also discusses with Cooper his belief in a direct connection to Native American spirituality. He is also the first person to verbally express to the viewers (as well as to Cooper) what the White Lodge and Black Lodge are.

One of the Bookhouse Boys and an all-around dependable guy, he saves the lives of both Truman and Cooper on more than one occasion. He has an unseen girlfriend named Diane Shapiro who is a local veterinarian with a PhD from Brandeis.

Hawk is promoted to Deputy Chief by 2016 and receives an ominous clue from Margaret Lanterman that he is told is connected to his heritage. The clue ultimately leads him to three pages of Laura Palmer's diary that were hidden in a bathroom stall door.

=== Lucy Moran (Brennan) ===
Lucy Brennan (née Moran), played by Kimmy Robertson, is a high-voiced, childlike blonde receptionist for the Twin Peaks sheriff's department. She is seeing deputy sheriff Andy Brennan, until they have an argument. She reveals later that she was also seeing Dick Tremayne, who works at Horne's Department Store, after feeling frustrated with Andy. Lucy gets pregnant, which turns out to be the reason she and Andy have been fighting. The paternity of the child is called into question when Andy reveals that he cannot be the father, due to low sperm count. He gets retested and finds out that he in fact could have been the father. This sparks a competition between Andy and Dick, both vying for Lucy's affection and the role of father to her child. This includes adopting "Little Nicky" through the Big Brothers program. After some particularly rude behavior from Dick, Lucy decides not to wait for the baby to be born in order to determine paternity and chooses Andy as the father.

In 1990, Simon & Schuster Audio released a cassette entitled "Diane ...": The Twin Peaks Tapes of Agent Cooper, which compiled many of Cooper's recorded diary entries that featured in the first season and the beginning of the second, along with specially recorded entries including several taking place before the pilot. One of the specially recorded entries takes place the night of Cooper's arrival in Twin Peaks and has Lucy giving Cooper directions to the Great Northern Hotel.

Lucy and Andy ultimately marry and raise their son, Wally. By 2016, she continues to serve as the receptionist of the sheriff's department and unsuccessfully attempts to help Hawk solve the mystery of the ominous clue he received from Margaret Lanterman.

=== Frank Truman ===
Frank Truman, played by Robert Forster, is Twin Peaks's sheriff in 2016. Formerly retired, he returns to the position after his younger brother Harry is stricken with cancer. He takes part in an investigation into Dale Cooper after Hawk is contacted by Margaret Lanterman.

Frank has a difficult relationship with his wife Doris, who is prone to emotional outbursts and frequently berates him. This behavior began after the death of their son, who committed suicide after serving in the military.

The character was introduced in The Return as Michael Ontkean, who played Harry S. Truman, had retired from acting during the series' hiatus and could not be persuaded to return. Ironically, Robert Forster was Lynch's choice to play Harry in the original pilot but pulled out due to scheduling issues.

=== Chad Broxford ===
Chad Broxford, played by John Pirruccello, is a deputy in the Twin Peaks sheriff's department. He often makes inappropriate and insensitive comments, mocking Margaret Lanterman and making light of the suicide of Frank Truman's son. He is also shown to be corrupt, having ties with Richard Horne, who bribes him. After Richard kills a boy in a hit-and-run accident, Chad intercepts a letter identifying Richard as the driver. His corruption is eventually uncovered by Sheriff Truman, who has him arrested and his badge taken away.

== Palmer family ==
=== Laura Palmer ===
Laura Palmer, played by Sheryl Lee, was the town's favorite daughter; she volunteered at Meals on Wheels, was the high school Homecoming queen, and was (apparently) the darling of her parents, Sarah and Leland. But Laura led a deeply troubled double life. She was addicted to cocaine, a survivor of incest, and a teenage prostitute. It is also revealed that she was manipulative and promiscuous, having had affairs with several men in Twin Peaks and having convinced her high school classmates to get involved in drug trafficking. She had briefly worked at One Eyed Jacks, a casino/brothel just north of the Canada–US border, until she was apparently fired for gratuitous cocaine usage.

The discovery of Laura's body in the pilot episode of Twin Peaks brought Special Agent Dale Cooper to town to investigate her death, and the effects it had on those around her propelled the first season and the first nine episodes of the second season. Laura remained prominent afterward, as her death had exposed many secrets both related and unrelated to her, such as the Packard mill conspiracy.

Laura's diary is uncovered in the first episode, but her secret diary is not recovered until much later, and it contains passages suggesting that she had long been the sometimes willing victim of abuse by a malevolent entity named BOB, who wanted to be close to her or even be her.

To save on money, Lynch intended to cast a local girl from Seattle "just to play a dead girl". The local girl ended up being Sheryl Lee. "But no one — not Mark, me, anyone — had any idea that she could act, or that she was going to be so powerful just being dead." Indeed, the image of Lee wrapped in plastic became one of the show's most enduring and memorable images. When Lynch shot the home movie that James takes of Donna and Laura, he realized that Lee had something special. "She did do another scene — the video with Donna on the picnic — and it was that scene that did it." As a result, Sheryl Lee became a semi-regular addition to the cast, appearing in flashbacks as Laura and becoming a recurring character—Maddy, Laura's cousin who also becomes another victim of BOB.

=== Leland Palmer ===
Leland Palmer, played by Ray Wise, is an attorney whose primary client is local businessman Ben Horne. He is well-known and respected in Twin Peaks. Together with his wife, Sarah, and his daughter, Laura, his family is seemingly perfect. When Laura is murdered, Leland's psychological foundations begin to crumble. He has multiple nervous breakdowns and during Laura's funeral, flings himself into her grave and must be pulled out. He remains unstable for some time. Later it becomes apparent that Leland has actually been troubled for some time. It is revealed that he is possessed by the evil spirit BOB (who may have been occupying Leland since childhood, when "Bob" was a neighbor of Leland's who often taunted him in passing) and has been influenced to commit multiple crimes (including repeatedly raping and ultimately killing his own daughter). It is never clear to what extent Leland is aware of his evil actions. Leland is caught by Cooper and the police, but after cigarette smoke activates the sprinkler system, the BOB inside him explodes into madness and Leland kills himself by bashing his head repeatedly against his cell's iron door, freeing himself from BOB. Leland says he regrets his actions and tells Cooper he did not want to harm Laura but that BOB made him do it. He then apparently "sees" Laura, and apologizes to her, before dying. 25 years after his death, he appears to Cooper in the Black Lodge, asking Cooper to find Laura.

=== Sarah Palmer ===
Sarah Palmer, played by Grace Zabriskie, is Laura Palmer's mother and Leland Palmer's wife. Laura is found murdered in the pilot episode of Twin Peaks. Sarah's husband Leland becomes unstable since the murder, and Sarah does not know what's going on. When Leland falls onto Laura's coffin at the funeral, Sarah tells him, "Don't ruin this, too!" During the second season, it is revealed that Leland killed Laura under the influence of the evil spirit BOB. It is implied in the series, and confirmed in the prequel film, that Leland/BOB had been drugging Sarah in order to sexually abuse Laura.

Sarah, a chain-smoker who gradually develops a complete nervous breakdown over the violent deaths and other bizarre events in her family, is shown to have some paranormal powers, and she is known for (on some occasions) predicting the future or seeing people (Bob) no one else sees. In the pilot, she has a vision of the other half of Laura's necklace (buried by James Hurley) being dug up and in a later episode, sees BOB at the foot of Laura's bed. Before Maddy's murder, Sarah has a vision of a white horse in her living room. Twin Peaks: Fire Walk With Me reveals that she had a similar vision just before Laura's murder. Windom Earle later speaks to Garland Briggs through Sarah, telling him that he is in The Black Lodge with Dale Cooper.

In Twin Peaks: The Return, Sarah still lives in her family's home in Twin Peaks as a reclusive alcoholic, spending her time drinking, smoking, and watching violent nature documentaries and boxing matches on television. She is involved in various strange occurrences during the season, only to be revealed to have apparently become possessed by an otherworldly force, possibly Judy, when she removes her face to reveal a swirling vortex underneath before ripping out the throat of a trucker who has been harassing her. When Cooper rescues Laura in Part 17, Sarah smashes Laura's iconic portrait with a glass bottle, screaming in agony as she does in the first episode. Her voice is later heard in Part 18 when Cooper arrives at the Palmer house with Carrie Page, calling Laura's name. Page screams in horror, and all the house's lights go out.

The girl in "Part 8" of Twin Peaks: The Return, played by Tikaeni Faircrest, is not identified in the episode itself, but The Final Dossier reveals that she is Sarah, who was living in New Mexico in 1956 when an unidentified creature crawled into her mouth after she was rendered unconscious by a Woodsman's radio broadcast.

=== Maddy Ferguson ===
Madeleine "Maddy" Ferguson, played by Sheryl Lee, first appears early on in the first season, when she travels to Twin Peaks from her hometown of Missoula, Montana (David Lynch's birthplace). She comes to help her uncle and aunt, Leland and Sarah Palmer, overcome the loss of Laura. Maddy is four years older than Laura but otherwise looks identical apart from her dark hair and glasses. She remarks that she and Laura used to pretend they were sisters. Despite their resemblance, the innocent and sweet Maddy stands in stark contrast to Laura, whose personal life is steeped in deception. Like Laura's mother and Laura herself, Maddy has premonitions, including one of a bloodstain on the floor of the Palmers' living room and another of Bob, a demonic entity plaguing the town.

Maddy quickly befriends Donna Hayward and James Hurley, Laura's closest friends, and helps them in their investigation into Laura's death. At one point, Maddy even wears a blonde wig to lure one of Laura's acquaintances.

During the second season, Maddy begins to resemble her cousin more and more: her hair (though still dark) straightens, she stops wearing her glasses, and in her carriage and demeanor, she behaves more like Laura as seen in Twin Peaks: Fire Walk with Me than the Maddy of the first season. This causes conflict with Donna and James when James becomes attracted to her and she begins to return his feelings in spite of herself.

Eventually, she is murdered by Leland Palmer, who is possessed by Bob, in a violent re-creation of Laura's murder. Maddy's death quickly leads to Leland's arrest. Her resemblance to Laura may have been key to Maddy's murder, since it is revealed in Fire Walk With Me that Teresa Banks, the first of Leland's victims, was selected because "you look just like my Laura" (although she was also planning to blackmail Leland).

The character is an elaborate reference to Alfred Hitchcock's 1958 film Vertigo, in which Kim Novak plays a blonde/brunette dual role, just as Lee plays Laura and Maddy. Madeleine is the name of Novak's blonde alter ego, while Ferguson is James Stewart's character's surname in the film. In Fire Walk With Me, several mentions are made of a "Judy" who never materializes. Judy is the name of Novak's brunette persona, and may be the third character Lee said Lynch intended her to play had the show not been cancelled.

== Hayward family ==
=== Will Hayward ===
Doctor Will Hayward, played by Warren Frost, is a physician and coroner who, due to his close relationship with her, refuses to perform Laura Palmer's autopsy. His first name is not generally used, but he is called "Will" in several episodes; he is normally just called "Doc".

He is the husband of Eileen and father of three daughters: Donna (who has by far the biggest role of the family), Harriet, and Gersten. The Doc is generally a balanced, fair man, but he is especially upset by Laura's murder, as he is a friend of the Palmers and his daughters knew her well.

Hayward also has an altercation with the abrasive Albert Rosenfield, who calls his work "amateur" and wishes to do more work on Laura's corpse. Unlike most of the characters in Twin Peaks, he appears to have no major nasty secrets or eccentricities. But toward the end of the second season, it is revealed that he may have been cuckolded by Benjamin Horne, who might in fact be Donna's real father - a question never resolved. In the final episode of the original series, Hayward attacks Ben and although it seems Ben has been seriously injured, Hayward shows up at the end of the episode apparently with his normal temperament. After Cooper is replaced by his doppelgänger, Hayward is revealed to have been the last person to see him before he left Twin Peaks, and speaks to Frank Truman in 2014 about his encounter.

=== Eileen Hayward ===
Eileen Hayward, played by Mary Jo Deschanel, is the wheelchair-using wife of Doc Hayward and mother of Donna. Why she is disabled is never revealed during the series. Highly tolerant and decent in every sense, she seems to have a murky past concerning Benjamin Horne.

=== Donna Hayward ===
Donna, played by Lara Flynn Boyle in the series and by Moira Kelly in the prequel, is Laura Palmer's best friend. After her death, she becomes obsessed with finding out who killed her and why, with the help of James Hurley (Laura's secret boyfriend and Donna's new love interest) and Madeleine Ferguson, Laura's look-alike cousin.

At the end of season two, it is strongly suggested that Doc Hayward might not be Donna's biological father after all and that she is in fact Benjamin Horne's daughter and Audrey Horne's half sister.

=== Harriet Hayward ===
Harriet, played by Jessica Wallenfels, is the middle child in the Hayward family. Harriet is shown to be a poet. She appears twice in the original series (but not in the revival), and both times feature her reading poetry she has written. In the show's pilot, Donna asks Harriet to lie to their father while she sneaks out the bedroom window to meet James Hurley to discuss the death of Laura Palmer. But Harriet, who is busy writing a poem, fails to adequately cover for her sister. Harriet's other appearance is in the first episode of the second season, "Episode 8", and features her reading a rather eerie poem she wrote about Laura while Gersten plays the piano.

=== Gersten Hayward ===
Gersten, played by Alicia Witt, is the youngest of three Hayward sisters. She appears in just one episode of the original series (and two of the revival), all brief appearances. Unlike her sisters and her mother, Gersten is a redhead. She is a skilled pianist. While she is a minor character, "Episode 8" ends with the credits rolling over footage of her playing the piano, showcasing Witt's musical talents.

Twenty-five years later, she is seen as an adult in two episodes of Season 3 having an affair with Steven Burnett and trying to calm him down during a bad trip. It is unclear whether she is also an addict.

== Horne family ==
=== Benjamin "Ben" Horne ===
Benjamin "Ben" Horne, played by Richard Beymer is one of Twin Peaks' two richest and most powerful people; according to Sheriff Truman, Horne "owns half the town", including The Great Northern Hotel, the town's only apparent travel lodgings; the Great Northern also acts, on occasion, as a de facto town hall, and the only place in Twin Peaks suitable for a wedding reception, making it one of the community's hubs. Ben also owns and runs Horne's, the town's only department store, and One Eyed Jacks, a casino/brothel just over the Canada–US border. He is a devious figure involved in drug and prostitution rings, and orders and orchestrates murders. His would-be monopoly on the town's economy is challenged only by Josie Packard, the owner of the Packard Saw Mill, one of the few major businesses in town that Horne does not own. At the outset of the series, Horne has been involved in an affair for some time with Catherine Martell, as part of an intricate plot to kill her, destroy the mill, become the beneficiary of her life insurance, and take sole ownership of the land on which the mill sits, which he intends to turn into a luxury country club. There is also speculation about Horne's previous involvement with Eileen Hayward, which leads to suspicion as to whether he is Donna Hayward's biological father. During the second season, he is briefly arrested on suspicion of murdering Laura Palmer. Due to the collapse of his business endeavors during his arrest, he has a nervous breakdown, falling into a delusional state for much of the season, during which he imagines himself a Confederate Civil War general. When he recovers, he attempts to right some of his wrongs, but does not completely keep himself out of trouble.

In the finale of the original series, Ben is attacked by Will Hayward and sustains a head injury after it is implied that he is Donna's biological father. In the revival, Ben is revealed to have survived, and as of 2016 he remains the owner of the Great Northern.

=== Sylvia Horne ===
Sylvia Horne, played by Jan D'Arcy, is Ben's wife and the mother of Audrey and Johnny, to whom she is also a caregiver. She often argues with Ben about the children, money, the Haywards, or Ben's brother, Jerry. She appears in all three seasons. At some point between the end of Season 2 and the third season revival 25 years later, it appears she is either divorced or separated from Ben, though still in communication with him about finances and Johnny, for whom she is still a caregiver.

=== Jerry Horne ===
Jeremy "Jerry" Horne, played by David Patrick Kelly, is Ben Horne's brother and the uncle of Audrey and Johnny. He is his brother's right-hand man and emissary, traveling around the world to act on Ben's behalf in his business dealings. Though not as intelligent as Ben, Jerry demonstrates world-awareness beyond that of most of the town's population. He is a lawyer, but not as capable as Leland Palmer, and he rarely practices. He and Ben share similar interests and characteristics—womanizing and cutthroat business dealings—but Jerry publicly displays all the unseemly traits Ben hides beneath a veneer of sophistication and class. The brothers' contrast is reflected in their attire: Ben wears tailored, neutral-colored business suits, and Jerry a variety of bizarre, multicolored outfits, seemingly culled from his trips around the world, with a strange hairdo resembling a hi-top fade. Despite their focus on getting their own way, the Horne brothers show genuine affection for each other.

Jerry ultimately leaves his profession as an attorney and, by 2014, starts producing cannabis products for sale. He also becomes increasingly disheveled and appears to have developed an addiction to cannabis. This addiction results in him getting lost in the woods and hallucinating.

=== Audrey Horne ===
Audrey Horne, played by Sherilyn Fenn, fits the image of a poor little rich girl, able to have anything she wants except her father's love. She discovers that her father, Ben, the town's business magnate, gave his love to the deceased Laura Palmer, both physically and emotionally.

Audrey is considered a troublemaker and initially lives up to that image. In the pilot, she derails one of her father's business deals, worth millions of dollars, by interrupting a meeting of Norwegian investors and telling them about Laura's murder. But she ultimately reveals herself to be a shrewd and sympathetic figure who goes out of her way for others. Although Audrey and Laura were not friends, Audrey says she "kind of loved Laura" because Laura tutored Audrey's brother Johnny.

=== Charlie ===
Charlie, played by Clark Middleton, is an unknown entity who may or may not be Audrey's husband. It is unknown whether he exists or is human. Audrey admits him she is having an affair with "Billy", who has gone missing. He first appears in "Part 12".

=== Johnny Horne ===
Johnny Horne is Audrey's older, intellectually disabled brother.

In a deleted scene from the second season (included in the "Twin Peaks The Entire Mystery" Blu-ray box set), Sylvia confesses to Dr. Jacoby that as a girl, Audrey pushed her brother Johnny down a flight of stairs, resulting in his brain damage. In response, Jacoby reminds Sylvia that there is no physical trauma in Johnny's brain; he remains in a childlike state because he wants to.

Johnny is the only character to be portrayed by three different actors:

- Robert Davenport originated the role, appearing in the pilot episode. He had a short-lived career, with only four roles - the Twin Peaks pilot, Brian Cochran in the movie The Chocolate War (1988), the short movie Short Cut (1999), and in the Disney Channel TV movie Chips, the War Dog (1990).
- Robert Bauer played Johnny in the most episodes and is probably the best known for the role, appearing in four episodes of the original series over the course of the first and second seasons. Bauer also appeared in the movie This Is Spinal Tap (1984) and TV shows like Star Trek: The Next Generation (1987). He co-created Bauerbrook Films with friend and Twin Peaks co-star Dana Ashbrook. He became known for his producing work.
- Stuntman Erik Rondell was the most recent actor to play the role, playing him in two episodes of The Return. Rondell has an almost 40-year career in film and television and is best known for his work on 24.

=== Richard Horne ===
Richard Horne, played by Eamon Farren, the son of Audrey and Cooper's doppelgänger, is introduced in The Return. A violent and unstable young man with ties to drug dealing, Richard kills a boy in a hit-and-run accident and attempts to cover it up. He nearly murders Miriam Sullivan, a witness to the accident, and steals his grandmother's money (along with everything else of potential value in her house) after assaulting her. Miriam survives and identifies Richard as the killer, but he escapes to Montana, where he encounters Cooper's doppelgänger. Recognizing the doppelgänger as an FBI agent, although unaware that he is his father, Richard follows the doppelgänger to the Dutchman's and confronts him. The doppelgänger promptly subdues Richard and sends him to a location indicated by a set of coordinates the doppelgänger received. Upon arriving there, Richard is killed by an electrical force.

== Packard family ==
=== Josie Packard ===
Jocelyn "Josie" Packard (Note: Chen is credited as playing Jocelyn Packard in the show's opening credits.), played by Joan Chen, is from Hong Kong, and is ethnic Chinese. Josie meets and marries Andrew Packard, owner of the Packard Mill, in Hong Kong and accompanies him to Twin Peaks. After Andrew's death in a boating accident, Josie inherits the mill, which is run by her sister-in-law Catherine. Catherine resents Josie for taking over the mill and suspects that Josie was responsible for Andrew's death. Catherine's husband, Pete Martell, a former woodcutter, is good friends with Josie, seeing her fragile side and striving to protect her. Through most of the first season, Josie seems innocent, an easy mark and potential victim for her savvy, cunning sister-in-law and Catherine's lover, Ben Horne. It is only later revealed that Josie is a classic femme fatale whose innocence masks a manipulative and cold-blooded side.

After her husband's death, Josie starts dating the town sheriff, Harry S. Truman. Agent Dale Cooper, in town investigating the murder of Laura Palmer, has befriended Truman and quickly detects Truman's feelings for Josie but does not trust her. To no avail, he warns Truman not to get too close to Josie. At the end of the first season, a mysterious caller shoots Cooper. He survives, thanks to a quick operation, but does not get a look at his assailant, who is later revealed to have been Josie. She reveals that she shot him out of fear that he would discover her role in Andrew's death and her other criminal wrongdoings. These fears turn out to be accurate. She ultimately dies of heart failure from "fear" after an encounter with evil spirit BOB after having shot and killed Thomas Eckhardt, a longtime tormentor of hers due to his obsession with her.

=== Andrew Packard ===
Andrew Packard, played by Dan O'Herlihy, was the sprightly and high-spirited owner of the Packard Sawmill. He was supposedly killed in a boating accident brought about by Hank Jennings, working on behalf of Andrew's wife, Josie, and his former business partner, Thomas Eckhardt, a sinister businessman operating in the Far East. Later it is revealed that Andrew anticipated the attempt and went into hiding.

Andrew and his sister Catherine Martell have a mutual distrust but are also mutually beneficent. Catherine seems to resent that Pete, her husband, gets along very well with Andrew.

Before he is killed, Eckhardt leaves Andrew and Catherine a mysterious puzzle. It is a box, with an astrological code on it, which in Russian doll fashion contains several other boxes within it. Andrew and Pete finally discover a key to a safety deposit box at the local bank after Andrew shoots the smallest one with the revolver he carries beneath his jacket.

When Andrew and Pete go to the bank and open the deposit, a bomb is triggered. The extent of the damage is unclear, as this happens in the final episode, but Andrew, Pete, and the bank clerk likely all died in the explosion (Audrey, chained to the bank vault door, was slated to have survived).

=== Catherine Martell ===
Catherine Martell, (played by Piper Laurie), is Andrew Packard's sister. She married lumberjack Pete Martell, but their happiness was short-lived. Though they remained married, Catherine holds her more simple and naive husband in contempt. After Andrew's death in a boating accident (actually brought about by his wife Josie and Hank Jennings), Catherine runs the mill, though Josie is the legal owner.

Catherine is having an affair with local businessman and landowner Ben Horne, with whom she is plotting to burn down the mill. Unknown to Catherine, Ben is also in cahoots with Josie, and the two of them are plotting to cut her out of the picture entirely, with the intent to shut down the mill and develop the land for their own profit. A highly devious and narcissistic person, Catherine later cons everyone by posing as a Japanese businessman (Mr. Tojamura) who buys shares of the land and destroys Horne's business.

=== Pete Martell ===
Pete Martell (played by Jack Nance) is a lumberjack who married his boss's sister Catherine. What started as a "summer's indiscretion" developed into a marriage that, from Pete's perspective, never should have happened, because "Catherine is plain hell to live with." While Pete is quiet and docile, Catherine is ruthless, stubborn, and determined. She does not make anything easy for Pete, who she considers a useless, soft old fool. It is made clear that Catherine was far richer than Pete, providing him at least financial consolation. Pete seems to harbor some genuine, nostalgic affection for his wife, which he expresses to Sheriff Truman when he thinks Catherine has died. After she reappears, she shows genuine affection for him, hinting at a deep bond between them.

Pete is a keen angler. While Catherine plots to get back her late brother's business, Pete spends his time fishing and joking affectionately with Josie, who is a balm to him compared to Catherine's constant spite and contempt.

Pete is an expert chess player, presumably the best in town and the surrounding area. In Season 2, he helps Special Agent Cooper in his deadly tournament against Windom Earle. He credits his chess ability to having extensively studied the games of José Raúl Capablanca.

In the series' opening scenes, Pete discovers Laura Palmer's dead body. In the series finale, Pete, Andrew Packard, and Audrey Horne are caught up in a bomb blast at the Twin Peaks National Bank, and their fates are not revealed. According to the 2016 tie-in book The Secret History of Twin Peaks, Pete and Andrew were killed in the blast but Audrey survived, with the implication that Pete saved Audrey by shielding her with his body.

== Briggs family ==
=== Garland Briggs ===
Major Garland Briggs, played by Don S. Davis, is a United States Air Force officer whose area of expertise appears to be paranormal activity, particularly Project Blue Book. He is the father of Bobby, whose wild antics and disrespectful attitude are a cause of great friction between them. His work with the government is highly classified, hidden even from his family.

His greatest fear, which he claimed was revealed under torture, is "the possibility that love is not enough". He is abducted at one point, possibly to the White Lodge, and told by the Log Lady to deliver a message to Special Agent Dale Cooper. In the second season, Major Briggs and Bobby find some common ground and begin to connect.

Between the events of the original series and the revival, Major Briggs creates a dossier that is depicted in the novel The Secret History of Twin Peaks. During the revival, Bobby says that he died in a station fire, while the Air Force learns that his fingerprints have been appearing at crime scenes. The Buckhorn, South Dakota Police Department later finds a headless corpse with his prints, although Air Force Lieutenant Cynthia Knox discovers that the corpse is too young to be Briggs. Briggs himself appears before Cooper as a floating head.

Briggs lives on as a floating head in the realm of the Fireman.

=== Bobby Briggs ===
Robert "Bobby" Briggs, played by Dana Ashbrook, was Laura Palmer's boyfriend. His father is Major Garland Briggs, a member of the U.S. military, with whom he has an uneasy relationship. Though Bobby was secretly seeing Shelly Johnson before Laura's death, he becomes jealous of James Hurley when he discovers that James was secretly seeing Laura. As it turns out, Laura did not really love Bobby but was merely using him as a source of cocaine.

The prequel film Twin Peaks: Fire Walk with Me shows that two days before Laura's death, Bobby (accompanied by Laura) had a midnight meeting, arranged by Jacques Renault, with Cliff Howard, deputy in Deer Meadow, the town in which Teresa Banks was murdered the previous year. Howard was supplying Bobby with cocaine to be sold in Twin Peaks; when an inebriated Laura yanks the drugs out of his hands, Howard pulls a gun and Bobby shoots him. This scene explains what James reported to Donna Hayward in the series pilot: that the night she was murdered, Laura had told him that someone had been killed.

In the first episode, Bobby is a suspect in Laura's death, but Cooper determines he is innocent and has him released. Bobby and Shelly move in together when Leo Johnson becomes comatose. He tries to become an assistant to Ben Horne but falls in with Horne at the point of Horne's nervous breakdown and finds little success.

Bobby later becomes a deputy in the Twin Peaks sheriff's department, a position he assumes by 2016. As Major Briggs's son, he is able to interpret clues his father left behind that mystify Sheriff Truman and Hawk. He is the father of Shelly's daughter, Becky.

== Hurley/Jennings families ==
=== Ed Hurley ===
"Big" Ed Hurley, played by Everett McGill, runs the local gas station. He also looks after his nephew James Hurley.

His marriage to Nadine, who is constantly seesawing between overbearing and highly depressed, ceased to be loving long ago, and seems driven primarily by his guilt over the hunting accident on their honeymoon in which she lost an eye. Due to a misunderstanding, he married her over his high-school sweetheart Norma Jennings. He has been having an affair with Norma, but his guilt, along with the imminent release of Norma's violent husband Hank, causes them to break things off. They resume their affair after Nadine regresses into her teen years and starts dating Mike, a teenager. Nadine even hospitalizes Hank while defending Ed from him. Ed and Norma announce their intention to marry, but Nadine's sudden recovery throws things into doubt. 25 years later, Nadine gives Ed her blessing to be with Norma.

Ed is also one of the Bookhouse Boys and serves as "unofficial deputy" to Sheriff Truman.

=== Nadine Hurley ===
Nadine Hurley, played by Wendy Robie, is married to Ed and well known in the town for her ferocity and eccentricity. She wears a patch over her left eye, having lost it in a hunting accident on their honeymoon. Ed's guilt over the accident (and other things) is perhaps all that holds together their mostly unhappy marriage, as he would rather have married Norma Jennings, his high-school sweetheart.

Nadine spends the first few episodes of the series in a state of obsession with trying to create the world's first completely silent drape-runners. She is successful when Ed accidentally spills mechanical grease on the cotton balls she is affixing to the runners. Nadine initially thinks this will make them both very rich, but it does not, because she is refused a patent, and she gives up hope that it will ever sell. She subsequently attempts suicide by overdosing on pills.

After falling into a coma, Nadine awakes believing herself to be a teenager in high school and, incidentally, just dating her husband. Her superhuman strength (already present in season one) allows her to join the school's wrestling team—the first female to do so. Though the cause of her memory loss is left largely to the viewer's imagination, adrenaline is circuitously mentioned at one point by Dr. Hayward.

As season two progresses, Nadine and Ed decide to "break up", and she begins pursuit of teenage Mike Nelson (captain of the Twin Peaks wrestling team). This leaves Ed free to pursue his true love, Norma.

In the final episode of the original series, Nadine suffers a blow to the head that results in the loss of her delusions of teenhood. She has no memory of anything that occurred since her suicide attempt. 25 years later, Nadine is an avid viewer of Lawrence Jacoby's "Dr. Amp" web series and has turned her silent drape-runners into a business.

=== James Hurley ===
James Hurley, played by James Marshall, lives with his uncle Ed and his aunt Nadine due to his troubled family situation: his father (probably Ed's brother), a musician, left mother and child behind when James was very young, while his mother, a writer, is an alcoholic who frequently has sex with total strangers.

James is a keen motorcycle rider. He is only quiet on the outside. James frequently has problems with women. He was Laura Palmer's secret lover. Bobby Briggs, Laura's boyfriend, resents James because of their relationship. After her death, he falls in love with his and Laura's best friend, Donna Hayward. Later, he is also attracted to Laura's lookalike cousin Maddy Ferguson, leading to disputes with Donna, who is similarly confused about her feelings for him. After Maddy's death, he leaves Twin Peaks and gets into trouble with Evelyn Marsh, who manipulates him for her own ends at first but then regrets it. After he is entangled in the conspiracy to murder her husband and exonerated, he decides he needs to get away from Twin Peaks and heads off to see the world. He is not seen again for the remainder of the original series, but professes his love for Donna and promises to come back for her.

In the 2017 revival, James has returned to Twin Peaks by 2016, and is revealed to have suffered a head injury in an accident. He works as a security guard at the Great Northern Hotel alongside Freddie Sykes.

=== Norma Jennings ===
Norma Jennings (née Blackburn), played by Peggy Lipton, is the owner of the Double R Diner, where she employs Shelly Johnson, a good friend of hers, and organizes the town's Meals on Wheels program, which Laura Palmer used to operate. She is a former Miss Twin Peaks, and becomes one of the judges at the latest pageant. She is later joined at the diner by her sister Annie Blackburn, a former nun with whom Cooper falls in love.

She does not care for her husband, Hank, a paroled criminal, and has long regretted that she did not end up with her high-school sweetheart Ed Hurley, whom she adores and is having an affair with. She finds it difficult to trust Hank, because he is a criminal and has let her down in the past, but eventually gives him a chance by letting him work in the diner. She wants to divorce Hank and marry Ed, but events continually prevent this. When Nadine regresses into her teenage years, Ed and Norma see an opportunity to marry, but Nadine's sudden recovery throws things into jeopardy.

Norma has a bad relationship with her mother, presumably long-standing, as Annie briefly inquires about this upon coming to Twin Peaks and does not argue when Norma tries to drop the subject. Their ties are broken for good when it turns out her mother is a famous food critic who writes under a pseudonym and gives the Double R Diner an unflattering review. Appalled by her mother's lack of sympathy for what Norma has dedicated her life to, Norma tells her she never wants to see her again.

=== Hank Jennings ===
Hank Jennings, played by Chris Mulkey, is the criminal (and during the first few episodes imprisoned) husband of Norma Jennings.

He is a career criminal, albeit a more professional one than Leo Johnson. A textbook sociopath, he is nevertheless able to put on a convincing nice-guy facade that fools some people. According to Sheriff Harry S. Truman, Hank once was a member of the Bookhouse Boys, in fact "one of the best", before he was expelled for his criminal activities. In many ways, Hank serves as a moral counterpoint to Truman, who does not trust Hank.

Before the start of the series, Josie Packard hired Hank to arrange the death of her husband Andrew, owner of the Packard Saw Mill, in a boating accident. (It is revealed later that Andrew anticipated and secretly avoided this attempt on his life.) Hank used his apparent involvement in a drunken driving accident as an alibi for the night of Andrew's death and was convicted of manslaughter. At the beginning of the series, he is due for parole after serving 18 months in the state prison.

Hank has a difficult relationship with his wife Norma, who feels lied to and betrayed by him. Norma is in love with Ed Hurley, as she has been since high school, and the two only married other people due to misunderstandings. Hank's imprisonment provides the couple safety to have an affair, and hence they are uneasy about his being free and nearby. Nonetheless, Norma gives restrained but positive testimony in Hank's parole hearing, ensuring his release, and gives him a job at her Double R Diner.

Upon his release, Hank immediately violates parole by committing a large number of crimes and by crossing the Canada–US border. He threatens Josie, who had agreed to pay him $90,000 upon his release, and tries to extort more money from her.

Ben Horne hires Hank for several shady dealings. In particular, Hank shoots Leo Johnson, after Leo set fire to the Packard Mill on Ben's orders. The shot does not kill Leo, but puts him into a coma. Unbeknownst to him, this was witnessed by Bobby Briggs, whom Leo had been about to kill with an axe at the time.

After crossing the Canada–U.S. border on Ben's orders, Hank is captured by Franco-Canadian criminal Jean Renault and becomes involved in his doings, especially the takeover of One Eyed Jacks and the Dead Dog Farm stakeout.

Hank decides to punish Ed for the affair with Norma but runs into Ed's superhumanly strong wife Nadine, who beats him to a pulp. Hank spends the remainder of the series on crutches and is eventually taken back to jail for parole violations. In his last appearance, he tries to get an alibi for the night of Leo's shooting from Norma while she is visiting his cell to ask for a divorce. Hank coldly replies: "you give me my alibi, and I'll give you a divorce". When Norma refuses (still not trusting Hank to keep his word), he reacts violently and calls her Ed's "whore", to which she replies: "I'd rather be his whore than your wife!" Norma then leaves Hank behind in jail.

The Secret History of Twin Peaks reveals that three years after his arrest, Hank was stabbed to death in prison by a distant cousin of the Renault family. Before his death, he gave a deathbed confession to his various crimes and wrote a quick note to his family and former friends apologizing for everything he had done.

=== Annie Blackburn ===
Annie Blackburn, played by Heather Graham, is the sister of Norma Jennings, from whom she gets a job in the RR Diner.

She appears in the final six episodes of the series and briefly in the prequel feature film Twin Peaks: Fire Walk with Me. A precocious introvert closer to nature than to people, she grew up in Twin Peaks, but after a painful first love that led her to a suicide attempt, she went to live in a convent. She has not decided if she wants to remain in the secular world, but is willing to see what it can offer her. Despite her lack of experience outside the convent, Annie is not naive about everyday sorrows and transgressions. She may be seen as a mirror for FBI Special Agent Dale Cooper, who falls in love with her, and she with him.

Annie seems to possess an intangible quality to which Cooper is drawn, almost hypnotically. Annie ultimately begins to represent a dark and painful truth from his past. Subsequently, she is cast into Cooper's urgent quest to elude/capture the progenitor of his increasingly nightmarish existence. In the final episode of the series she is trapped in the Black Lodge by Windom Earle who brings her there as his "Queen" after she wins Miss Twin Peaks, as part of his chess match against Cooper. At the end of the episode, after entering the Black Lodge in an attempt to save her, Cooper is replaced with a doppelganger possessed by the spirit of Bob, and he and Annie depart the Black Lodge. Annie is reported to have been hospitalized by the end of the series.

In Twin Peaks: Fire Walk with Me, Annie briefly appears to Laura Palmer in a dream, bruised and bloodied (appearing the same way she did when she exited the Black Lodge), to warn her of her death, but as this has yet to happen, Laura does not understand the omen. The clue that Annie says to Laura is "My name is Annie, and I've been with Laura and Dale. The good Dale is in the Lodge, and he can't leave. Write it in your diary."

The diary entry containing Annie's message, along with two other pages, is later hidden in a stall door in the Twin Peaks sheriff's department. In 2014, it is found by Deputy Chief Hawk, providing Hawk and Sheriff Frank Truman with a vital clue regarding Cooper.

The Final Dossier by Mark Frost reveals Annie's ultimate fate, namely that following the events of her abduction and rescue, she has been stuck in catatonic state for 25 years and placed in an institution as a result. Since entering this state, Annie has never spoken a word, with one notable and repeated exception; once every year, at the anniversary of exact time of her kidnapping, she says "I'm fine," out loud, apparently to no one in particular, before falling silent again.

== Johnson family ==
=== Shelly Johnson ===
Shelly Briggs (née McCauley, formerly Johnson), played by Mädchen Amick, is a waitress at the Double R Diner (which is owned by Norma Jennings, a good friend of hers).

Shelly dropped out of high school to marry trucker Leo Johnson, who had swept her off her feet by lavishing her with attention. As soon as they got married, it became clear that Leo just "wanted a maid he didn't have to pay for," in the words of Shelly. Leo is a sadistic, monstrous home dictator, wife-beater, rapist and dangerous criminal, and he is tangibly connected to Laura Palmer's murder.

Shelly has been having an affair with Laura's boyfriend, Bobby Briggs. Bobby, like Laura, is still in high school, and besides being a jock, he's something of a known hooligan. Although Bobby does not quite tread on the right side of the law, he is at least kind to Shelly, unlike Leo. The risk of the affair is great; Bobby deals drugs for Leo and knows just how dangerous Leo is. Leo eventually finds out, and sexually assaults, then tries to kill Shelly by tying her up inside the Packard Saw Mill and setting it on fire. However Catherine Martell, who was also meant to die in the fire, reluctantly frees Shelly and helps her escape. Catherine, however, vanishes.

During the show's second season, Leo lapses into a catatonic state after being shot by Hank Jennings. Shelly is forced to quit her job at the Double R Diner to take care of Leo at home, where she and Bobby openly flaunt their relationship in front of him, mainly out of frustration that his monthly disability benefits are almost completely used up by the costs of keeping him at home. When Leo awakens from his catatonia and tries to kill Shelly, Bobby comes to Shelly's defense and fights with Leo. Shelly manages to stab Leo in the leg with a knife, and the wounded Leo staggers off into the woods. Shelly later asks Norma for her old job at the Double R Diner, which Norma gladly gives back to her. Shelly - along with Donna Hayward and Audrey Horne - later receives fragments of poetry from former FBI man Windom Earle, as part of Earle's elaborate scheme. At the urging of Bobby, Shelly enters the Miss Twin Peaks contest, which is ultimately won by Annie Blackburn. In Shelly's last appearance in the original series, Bobby proposes marriage to her, which she would like to accept were it not for the fact that she is still married to Leo.

Shelly later marries Bobby. They have a daughter, Becky. She remains a waitress at the Double R Diner by 2016, and becomes concerned about Becky after she marries Steven Burnett, a drug addict. She and Bobby separate, but their relationship is amicable; the two comfort Becky together at the Double R after Becky becomes frustrated by Steven, who is having an affair with Gersten Hayward.

=== Leo Johnson ===
Leo Johnson, played by Eric Da Re, is a trucker who also moonlights as Twin Peaks's primary source of narcotics (which he obtains from the Renault Brothers and traffics over the Canada–US border). Harry S. Truman has never been able to obtain evidence of his criminal dealings. Leo is married to Shelly Johnson, a waitress at the town diner. Sadistic and volatile, he regularly beats her for both real and imagined transgressions, ranging from her infidelity with high school football player Bobby Briggs to his dissatisfaction with the way she washes the kitchen floor.

In the course of the series, Leo becomes one of the primary suspects in the murder of Laura Palmer. As it turns out, Leo was simply with Laura before she was murdered by Killer Bob. While under investigation, Leo is hired for his criminal skills by Ben Horne, who tasks him with burning down the Packard Saw Mill with his business rival Catherine Martell inside so that Horne can simultaneously kill his competition and destroy the only obstacle to his obtaining the valuable Mill land. Leo decides to use the situation to solve his own marital discord, abducting Shelly and then tying her up inside the mill shortly before setting fire to it with a time bomb. Catherine foils his plans by freeing Shelly and helping her escape. When Leo returns home after setting fire to the mill, he discovers Bobby in his house looking for Shelly. Leo tries to kill him with an axe, but is shot by Hank Jennings, who was hired by Ben Horne to kill Leo in order to cover Ben's tracks.

Leo spends most of the second season in a vegetative state, cared for by Shelly and Bobby, who take him in as part of a scheme to commit insurance fraud. Their plan backfires when it turns out that Leo's home care is far more expensive than they had anticipated, and the pair are left destitute. To vent their frustration, they take to teasing Leo and flaunting their relationship in front of him.

Near the end of the season, Leo regains some of his cognitive abilities and attacks Shelly and Bobby. Wounded during a struggle, he staggers into the woods, where he is abducted by escaped mental patient (and former FBI agent) Windom Earle. Earle enslaves the barely coherent Leo by fitting him with a shock collar and forcing him into submission. Leo spends the remainder of the series as a semi-mute drone, serving as Earle's henchman. In the third-to-last episode Leo frees another of Earle's captives, Major Garland Briggs, believing Shelly's life to be in danger after Earle posts a photo of her on his cabin wall. In the series finale, Earle leaves Leo for dead, rigging a cage of tarantulas above Leo's head, with a string affixed between Leo's teeth; if Leo lets go of the string, the cage will drop on his face, releasing the agitated tarantulas.

Although Leo's fate is not disclosed in the 2017 series, The Final Dossier reveals that he was shot to death by an unknown assailant. His autopsy is performed by Albert Rosenfield, who suspects that Leo was killed by an individual with an FBI background, implied to be either Windom Earle or Cooper's doppelgänger.

== Renault family ==
The three Renault brothers in the original series — Jacques, Bernard and Jean — are French Canadian and heavily involved in various kinds of crime, primarily drug running. No two of the three brothers are ever shown together on screen during the series. By the end of the original series, all three are dead.

The revival introduces a fourth member of the family, Jean-Michel, whose relationship with the three brothers is unknown.

=== Jacques Renault ===
Jacques, played by Walter Olkewicz, used to be a woodcutter but had to quit that job because of his considerable weight. He then went to other jobs, working as a bartender at the Roadhouse in Twin Peaks as well as a croupier at One Eyed Jack's, a casino and brothel located across the Canada–US border. Together with Leo Johnson, he ran drugs from Canada into Twin Peaks. Both Leo and Jacques rape Laura Palmer the night she is killed.

He flees from the Twin Peaks police into Canada, but is questioned incognito by Agent Cooper at One Eyed Jacks. Cooper tricks him into returning to Twin Peaks, where he is ambushed and arrested on the charge of murdering Laura Palmer. Having been shot and wounded during the arrest, he is taken to the hospital, where Laura's father, Leland, suffocates him with a pillow, apparently as revenge on the supposed killer of his daughter.

=== Bernard Renault ===
Bernard, played by Clay Wilcox, is the youngest of the Renault brothers. He helps Jacques in his drug running and warns him to stay away from the Roadhouse. He is captured and interrogated by the Bookhouse Boys but refuses to answer their questions. He is later murdered by Leo Johnson and left in the woods.

=== Jean Renault ===
Jean, played by Michael Parks, is the eldest and most ruthless of the three brothers, but hides his ruthlessness behind a soft-spoken, charming appearance. He is described as being involved in gambling, extortion, drug dealing and other crimes in the Northwest before his first appearance in the series.

He first appears during Blackie's attempt to wrest control of One Eyed Jack's from owner Benjamin Horne. He reportedly once sold insurance for the brothel to Horne and is also the lover of Blackie's younger sister Nancy. Now, he acts as a go-between for Blackie, who's holding Horne's daughter Audrey ransom, and Horne, but he also has a personal score to settle: he wants to get revenge on Agent Cooper, who he blames for the death of his younger brothers. His intentions are thwarted as Cooper and Sheriff Harry S. Truman infiltrate One Eyed Jack's and rescue Audrey.

On the night Audrey is rescued, Jean kills Blackie, takes control of the brothel, and acquires the services of Ben Horne's henchman Hank Jennings. Later, he stages a plot to frame Cooper for drug running, leading to Cooper's temporary suspension. He is eventually killed by Cooper during a hostage standoff at Dead Dog Farm.

=== Jean-Michel Renault ===
Jean-Michel Renault, played by Walter Olkewicz, is the owner of the Roadhouse in 2014. His relationship with the three Renault brothers is currently unknown. He is depicted as being involved with prostitution.

=== Blackie O'Reilly ===
Blackie O'Reilly (nicknamed The Black Rose and portrayed by Victoria Catlin) is the madame of One Eyed Jacks, the casino/brothel just north of the Canada–US border. She runs Jack's at the behest of its secret owner, Benjamin Horne. In keeping with the "upscale" theme of the establishment, Blackie adorns herself in glamorous black evening gowns and exudes an air of sophistication and being a member of the "upper class". She is the highest authority at Jacks, aside from Ben Horne, eliciting absolute obedience from the cadre of prostitutes in her stable. Whenever a new girl is hired, she oversees a coin-tossing ceremony between Ben and Jerry Horne to see which man will "break her in". She has a heroin habit and is bisexual. The sister of Nancy, she is later killed by Jean during Dale Cooper's and Harry's raid on the brothel.

== Locals ==
=== Ronette Pulaski ===
Ronette Pulaski, portrayed by Phoebe Augustine, is the daughter of Janek Pulaski (an employee of the Packard Saw Mill) and his wife Suburbis Pulaski. She attended Twin Peaks High School.

She worked at the perfume counter at Horne's Department Store, and at One Eyed Jacks. She and Laura Palmer are both kidnapped and violently beaten by the serial killer BOB during the crime that drives much of the series. Laura is murdered, but Ronette manages to escape. She is discovered wandering along train tracks in a trance. As she had crossed state lines, the FBI becomes involved in the investigation. She lapses into a coma, emerging only briefly to identify BOB from a drawing.

The character appears only briefly in the series, with few lines of dialogue, but she proves an integral part of the overall plot, especially since she is with Laura at her end. Her picture, along with that of Leo Johnson's truck, are found in Fleshworld (a swingers magazine) by FBI Special Agent Dale Cooper, and Sheriff Harry S. Truman, along with a forwarding address which allows them to track down to whom it belonged. She also appears toward the very end of the series when Cooper brings her in to confirm that the smell of engine oil is usually an indicator that BOB is nearby.

She appears throughout the series, especially in the second season and even returns briefly in the finale of the original series, but is featured most heavily in both the pilot episode and the 1992 movie Twin Peaks: Fire Walk with Me.

A small aspect of her character in relation to Fire Walk with Me is that she was somehow meant to come out of Laura's murder alive. During the final scene in the train car, Laura sees Ronette's "guardian angel" looking over her as she frantically prays for her life. Ronette's ropes are miraculously cut free, allowing Ronette to open the door to the train car and let MIKE throw the green/owl ring into the carriage. Laura then places this ring on one of her fingers, which forces BOB to kill her instantly rather than inhabit her body against her will, as he desired. Earlier, Laura had seen what she believed to be her own guardian angel abandoning her when she saw the angel disappear from a picture on her wall. When Ronette is brought in during the last episodes, she appears to have reformed, dressing demurely and co-operating with the police without question.

==== "American Girl" ====
Twenty-five years later, in Part 3 of the revival series, a mysterious entity that looks like Ronette appears. Also played by Augustine, she is credited just as "American Girl", and it is unknown if the character, beyond appearance, is the same as or related to the previous role.

=== Lawrence Jacoby ===
Lawrence Jacoby, portrayed by Russ Tamblyn, is a highly eccentric psychiatrist. Born January 30, 1934, Jacoby spent some of his life in Hawaii, and is fascinated by Tiki culture.

Laura Palmer was Jacoby's patient. Jacoby has radically unconventional treatment practices, and it is unclear whether his treatment of Laura was inappropriate. At Laura's grave after her funeral, Jacoby tells FBI agent Dale Cooper that he is not a good person and does not really care about his patients, who see him as their friend, but that Laura changed all that and changed him; Laura was in pain, and the reasons for that were so mysterious that Jacoby could not penetrate the walls she had built around it. Because of this, he has an insight into Laura's personality that few others have. The unidentified person in Sarah Palmer's vision seen digging up James's half of Laura's necklace (at the end of the pilot) is in fact Jacoby.

James, Donna, and Maddy Ferguson discover that Laura had made a series of audiotapes for Jacoby in which she describes some of her dreams and nightmares. Believing he has more of these, they hatch a plan to lure him away from his office by dressing Maddy up as Laura and filming her making a similar message. When Jacoby goes to confront "Laura", he is attacked and beaten unconscious by a masked figure, suffering a heart attack in the process. After a period of recovery he returns to continue his work, mainly with Ben Horne and Nadine Hurley.

Jacoby is married to a Hawaiian woman, Eolani (Jennifer Aquino, uncredited), who is seen only once in the series. He is known for keeping cocktail umbrellas marked with dates of events that affected him. He is also a keen surfer. A recognizable trait are his glasses, one lens of which is blue, the other red. He also can do some conjuring tricks.

After his medical license is revoked, Jacoby moves to a mobile home by 2014 and begins broadcasting an internet series as "Dr. Amp". As part of the series, he sells shovels that he spray-paints gold. He starts a possible romantic relationship with Nadine, an avid watcher of his show.

The character is rumored to have been inspired by the ethnobotanist and shamanistic explorer Terence McKenna.

In "The Firefly", a 2011 episode of the science fiction series Fringe, Walter Bishop uses a pair of red-and-blue glasses to examine a man's aura and says, "These were created by an old friend of mine, Dr. Jacoby from Washington State."

=== Mike Nelson ===
Mike Nelson, portrayed by Gary Hershberger, was Donna Hayward's boyfriend and close friends with Bobby Briggs. He was on both the high school football and wrestling teams. On the other hand, he also dealt drugs with Bobby on behalf of Leo Johnson, their supplier.

As Donna grows closer to James Hurley, she breaks up with Mike. Mike initially did not take the breakup well, but soon became involved with an amnesiac Nadine Hurley. Mike fell in love with Nadine and planned to marry her, but was heartbroken when she regained her memory and had no recollection of her affection for him. It is not known if Nadine went back to her husband, Big Ed. Mike is a businessman by 2014 and angrily rejects a job application from Steven Burnett, citing Steven's lack of professionalism.

Mike was illustrative of the theme of duality that pervaded Twin Peaks. He was, with Bobby, one of two duos in the series named "Mike" and "Bob", the others being Mike / Phillip Gerard the one-armed man and Bob.

=== Margaret Lanterman (Log Lady) ===
Margaret Lanterman, better known as the Log Lady, makes semi-regular appearances in both seasons, and is played by Catherine E. Coulson, who also very briefly reprised the role for a single scene in the prequel film Twin Peaks: Fire Walk with Me.

The Log Lady is a fixture in the town of Twin Peaks by the time of Laura Palmer's murder, and most residents in the town regard her as crazy. This is mainly due to her habit of always carrying a small log in her arms, with which she seems to share a psychic connection, often dispensing advice and visions of clairvoyance that she claims come from the log; before the murder, she delivers moving and cryptic warnings to Laura Palmer herself. The Log Lady does not interpret the messages transmitted by the log, but instead functions as a medium for the information it conveys.

Margaret returns in the 2017 series, where she sends Deputy Chief Hawk a message about a missing clue about Dale Cooper that is connected to Hawk's heritage. The clue turns out to be three pages of Laura Palmer's diary hidden in a bathroom stall in the sheriff's department. She later sends Hawk a second clue mentioning Laura.

=== Harold Smith ===
Harold Smith, portrayed by Lenny Von Dohlen, has agoraphobia and thus does not leave his home. Laura Palmer met him when she delivered his meals. Laura gave Harold her secret diary for safe-keeping, because BOB did not know about him. Harold grows and develops new orchid hybrids in his home. He also makes a habit of recording things people tell him, such as their memories and their deepest thoughts.

Donna Hayward, Laura's best friend, befriends him during her investigation into her death. Their relationship ends badly when Donna and Maddy Ferguson attempt to steal Laura's secret diary, believing it holds the key to finding her murderer. His faith in human decency shattered, Harold is later discovered to have hanged himself, with scraps of the diary around him. His suicide note reads "J'ai une âme solitaire" (French for "I have a lonely soul").

=== Dick Tremayne ===
Dick Tremayne (Ian Buchanan) is a selfish and pretentious man, whom Lucy Moran dated for a while on the side after becoming annoyed with Deputy Andy Brennan. Known for his effete mannerisms, he works in men's fashion at Horne's Department store. When he finds out Lucy is pregnant (and is not sure who the father of the baby is), he first attempts to have her get an abortion, but then tries (albeit halfheartedly) to prove his capability as a parent by "helping" an orphan boy who needs a father figure. Because of this, he has an ongoing rivalry with Andy, though they bond at a few points. Dick's condescending behavior becomes such that Lucy ultimately decides she does not care who the real father is and chooses Andy to help her raise her child.

Dick first appears in the third episode of season two.

=== Heidi ===
Heidi (Andrea Hays) is a waitress at the Double R Diner in the original series, the movie, and the revival. Known for her distinctive giggle, she has appeared in every filmed incarnation of Twin Peaks—the 1990 original series, the 2017 revival, and the 1992 prequel movie Twin Peaks: Fire Walk with Me (and Twin Peaks: The Missing Pieces). All her scenes are set in the diner.

=== Dwayne Milford ===
The mayor of Twin Peaks from 1962 until at least 1990. He was well known for his ongoing feud with his brother Dougie.

=== Dougie Milford ===
A United States Air Force officer, specifically assigned to investigations concerning UFOs. In his later years, he was the publisher of the local newspaper, the Twin Peaks Gazette. He was known to marry often, lastly to Lana Budding Milford. His character appeared in the original series, but was only given an in-depth backstory in Mark Frost's book The Secret History of Twin Peaks.

=== Lana Budding Milford ===
Lana Milford (Robyn Lively), née Budding, was a seductive woman known to charm almost any man around her, particularly the brothers Dougie and Dwayne Milford.

=== Nicky Needleman (Little Nicky) ===
Nicholas "Nicky" Needleman was a mischievous orphaned boy who came under the care of Dick Tremayne through the Happy Helping Hand program. He was used by both Dick and Andy to prove which of them would make a more suitable father to Lucy's baby.

== Outsiders ==
=== Carl Rodd ===
Carl Rodd (Harry Dean Stanton) first appears in Twin Peaks: Fire Walk with Me. The beleaguered manager of the Fat Trout Trailer Park in Deer Meadow, Washington, he does not like to be disturbed before 9 AM, and gets surly when FBI Agents Chester Desmond and Sam Stanley show up at dawn to inspect the deceased Teresa Banks's trailer. He complains the trailer has been like "uncle's day at a whorehouse". He then softens up and shares his "best goddamn coffee you're gonna get anywhere" with the agents during their inspection. In a melancholy reverie, he confesses, "I've already gone places. I just want to stay right where I am."

Later, Rodd answers Cooper's questions about Chester Desmond's disappearance and agrees to help a disabled elderly tenant with her hot water problems, for which he prescribes Valium.

In season 3, he has relocated to Twin Peaks and manages the New Fat Trout Trailer Park.

=== Selena Swift ===
Selena Swift (Erika Anderson) is an actress known for her dual roles as Jade and Emerald on the soap opera Invitation to Love that is a popular show in Twin Peaks and is watched by nearly all of the residents. Many of the events in Twin Peaks mimic events on the show, and Selena's characters Jade and Emerald parallel with Laura Palmer and Maddy Ferguson, the innocent Jade mirroring Maddy and the dark and deceitful Emerald mirroring Laura. Selena's debut as the twins was similar to Maddy's introduction in the fourth episode of the first season.

=== Evelyn Marsh ===
Evelyn Marsh (Annette McCarthy) lives in one of the towns near Twin Peaks, which James Hurley "drifts" to after he flees Twin Peaks in the wake of Maddy Ferguson's murder. Evelyn is very wealthy, and she and her absentee husband, Geoffrey/Jeffrey, own a small fleet of expensive cars, which she initially drafts James to repair.

Evelyn is complex and unpredictable. She attracts James through a combination of her physical attributes and the pity he feels for her when she reveals that Geoffrey frequently beats her. In reality, she is involved with a third man, Malcolm Sloan, who lives with the family under the guise of being her brother and acting as chauffeur, and the two have hatched a plan to kill Geoffrey. She engages James in a kind of boy toy sexual relationship, intending to set him up as the fall guy for her husband's death. When Donna arrives to bring James home, Evelyn taunts her, revealing her and James's relationship.

After her husband's murder, Evelyn appears to soften toward James and show repentance for her actions, giving James enough warning to get out of the house before the police arrive. She gives the police his full name and even indicates where they might find him, but seems to waver. When he comes back to talk to her, she pleads for him to leave. Malcolm knocks James out and tries to persuade Evelyn to shoot him, concocting a story to cover the situation, but in the end Evelyn can't go through with it and she shoots Malcolm dead instead when he tries to attack her, allowing James to go free. After this, all that is heard from Evelyn is that James is to give evidence at her trial.

=== Thomas Eckhardt ===
Thomas Eckhardt (David Warner) is a powerful businessman. He hails from South Africa, but moved to Hong Kong, where he formed a business partnership with American Andrew Packard. The relationship soured as the two competed for the love of Josie, a protégé of Eckhardt. Eventually Josie married Andrew, who took her with him to Twin Peaks. However, it is unclear whether this was in fact part of a plan by Eckhardt, as Josie arranged the assassination of Andrew, covered up by a boating accident.

After Josie has also arranged for the burning of the Packard saw mill and selling the land, Eckhardt expects her to return to Hong Kong. When she refuses and kills Eckhardt's emissary, Eckhardt personally comes for her and insists on a meeting. Josie shoots Eckhardt but dies only moments later out of intense fear, accompanied by the appearance of "Bob", who mocks the approaching Agent Cooper.

On Eckhardt's order, his femme fatale-esque assistant, Miss Jones (played by Brenda Strong), also attempts to kill Josie's lover, Sheriff Truman, but he manages to survive.

Eckhardt left a puzzle box to Andrew Packard, who was revealed to have eluded his assassination, and Catherine Martell. The box contains several boxes and eventually holds the key to a safe deposit box at the local bank. When Andrew opens the box, a bomb explodes, killing Andrew and Pete Martell.

=== Teresa Banks ===
Teresa Banks is a 17-year-old drifter and cocaine addict. Her murder in Deer Meadow, Washington, precedes that of Laura Palmer and is part of the plot of the 1992 prequel film, Twin Peaks: Fire Walk with Me. Pamela Gidley portrayed Banks in the film.

Banks lived at the Fat Trout trailer park for a month (where minor characters Mrs. Chalfont and her grandson also lived until they moved away following Teresa's murder). She worked the night shift as a waitress at Hap's Diner.

Her body was found, wrapped in plastic, in Wind River. She died from "repeated blows to the back of the head by a blunt obtuse-angled object," according to FBI Special Agent Sam Stanley. The murderer took her ring, which was adorned with a symbol used late in the series in conjunction with the Black Lodge. Stanley also discovered a small piece of white paper imprinted with the letter "T" beneath the nail of her left ring finger, what would become the calling card of the serial killer who later murders Laura Palmer and attacks Ronette Pulaski. Stanley and Special Agent Chester Desmond investigated her murder on the orders of FBI Chief Gordon Cole. No one claimed her body after her murder, and she had no known next of kin.

Like Laura and Ronette, Teresa placed personal ads in Fleshworld, a fictional swingers magazine known to be read and utilized by Twin Peaks drug dealer Jacques Renault, who also runs a sort of low-key prostitution ring on the side. It was through such an advertisement that she became acquainted with Laura's father, Leland Palmer, who muses, "You look just like my Laura" (a later murder, Laura's cousin Madeleine Ferguson, is also said to have been chosen because she resembled Laura).

One day, Leland arrives at a motel room having pre-arranged a rendezvous with Banks and "some of [her] girlfriends" and, to his surprise, discovers one of these to be his daughter. Leland ducks out before Laura sees him, but Banks becomes suspicious of his sudden change of heart. Eventually, she discovers Leland's identity and attempts to blackmail him but is subsequently murdered by him before she can collect.

=== Windom Earle ===
Windom Earle is a former FBI agent, who was once partner and best friend to Agent Dale Cooper. He is played by Kenneth Welsh and is featured in the latter half of the second season as the primary antagonist following the conclusion of the Laura Palmer investigation. He is an evil genius and a master of disguise, well-versed in esoterica from all parts of the world. He has extensive knowledge of the "dugpas", ancient sorcerers from Tibet dedicated to pure evil. Cooper says of Windom Earle: "his mind is like a diamond: cold, hard, and brilliant."

Earle was institutionalized after killing his wife Caroline, the love of Cooper's life, and trying to kill Cooper as well. He escapes and comes to Twin Peaks, hiding out in the woods, with the announced intention of ruining Cooper's life before killing him. He captures and enslaves Leo Johnson to act as an unwilling henchman, and finally kidnaps Annie Blackburn to lure Cooper into a trap.

He has a fascination with the Black Lodge, whose secrets he is trying to unlock, as well as black magic. Major Garland Briggs states that Earle was involved in Project Blue Book, as was Briggs; however, their investigation in which Earle was involved was directly related to Twin Peaks and not the usual UFO investigations, and his growing obsession with the Lodge led to his dismissal from the project.

He is obsessed with chess and this plays a major role in most of his first appearances, when he decides to use real people as the pieces in a game against Cooper. The true intention of this is to make his way into the Black Lodge, whose power he hopes to harness, while also getting revenge on Cooper. By claiming to have control over Annie's survival, Earle attempts to blackmail Cooper into offering Earle his soul and stabs him in the Lodge, but BOB, who says that Earle cannot ask for souls, turns back time to stop this and then takes Earle's soul for himself.

Dramatically, Earle represents the dark counterpoint of Cooper: an FBI agent, once pure and following a code representing good, ultimately being corrupted and pursuing evil; the implication being that even a pure soul like Cooper can wind up like Earle, as the Cooper doppelgänger represents.

=== Judge Clinton Sternwood ===
Judge Clinton Sternwood (Royal Dano) is a judge who visits Twin Peaks to preside over the case against Leland Palmer for the murder of Jacques Renault and the arson case against Leo Johnson for the fire at the Packard Sawmill. He is familiar with Harry and Lucy, but meets Agent Cooper for the first time during this visit. He and his law clerk, Sid, stay at the Great Northern Hotel during their visit. Sternwood appears in the episodes "Laura's Secret Diary" and "The Orchid's Curse".

=== Sid ===
Sid (Claire Stansfield) is a law clerk who accompanies Judge Sternwood during his visit to Twin Peaks. Agent Cooper is impressed by her beauty and assumes she is the judge's wife until Harry tells him otherwise. Sid appears in the episodes "Laura's Secret Diary" and "The Orchid's Curse".

=== William Hastings ===
William Hastings (Matthew Lillard) is a high school principal who, along with his secret lover Ruth Davenport, investigated the supernatural and alternate dimensions. He also ran a blog named Search the Zone, which documented evidence of the supernatural and alternate dimensions. Hastings and Ruth later encountered the floating head of Garland Briggs, which asked them to give him specific coordinates. The two complied, and Briggs disappeared after repeating Cooper's name. Hastings was arrested a few days later after Davenport was found dead with Briggs's headless corpse, as his fingerprints were all over the crime scene. After confirming in an interview with FBI agent Tammy Preston that the floating head was Briggs, he took the FBI to 2240 Sycamore, where he had encountered Briggs. Left inside a police car, Hastings is confronted by a Woodsman, who causes his head to implode.
