= Shelly Johnson (Twin Peaks) =

Twin Peaks character

- Twin Peaks character
- First appearance: "Pilot" (1990)
- Last appearance: "Part 15" (2017)
- Created by: Mark Frost; David Lynch
- Portrayed by: Mädchen Amick
- Duration: 1990–1992, 2014, 2017

In-universe information
- Full name: Shelly McCauley (maiden name); Shelly Johnson (first married name); Shelly Briggs (second married name)
- Occupation: Waitress
- Spouses: Leo Abel Johnson (first husband; deceased); Bobby Briggs (second husband)
- Children: Becky Burnett (daughter)
- Relatives: Steven Burnett (son-in-law)
- Nationality: American
- Birth date: May 30, 1972

Shelly Johnson (née McCauley, later known as Shelly Briggs), is a fictional character in the Twin Peaks franchise. She was created by series creators Mark Frost and David Lynch and portrayed by Mädchen Amick. She is a main character in the original series, and has a supporting role in the prequel films Twin Peaks: Fire Walk with Me (1992) and Twin Peaks: The Missing Pieces (2014). Shelly returns in the 2017 revival series. In the original series, Shelly dropped out of high school to marry the trucker Leo Johnson, who began to abuse her after their marriage. Shelly works as a waitress at the Double R Diner and has an affair with Bobby Briggs. In Twin Peaks: The Return, it is revealed that Shelly married Bobby and still works at the Double R Diner. Her main storyline focuses on her trying to save their troubled daughter, Becky Burnett, from her own marriage to an abusive drug addict.

== Appearances ==
=== In television ===
Shelly is a waitress who dropped out of high school to marry the trucker Leo Johnson (Eric Da Re), who she had fallen for after he gave her attention. Once they got married, however, she realized Leo just "wanted a maid he didn't have to pay for", and that he became abusive whenever he didn't get his way. Shelly has been having an affair with Bobby Briggs (Dana Ashbrook), Laura's boyfriend. Leo finds out, and attempts to kill Shelly by tying her up inside the Packard Saw Mill and setting it on fire. However, Catherine Martell (Piper Laurie), another intended victim of the fire, frees Shelly and helps her escape.

During the second season, Leo is in a catatonic state after being shot by Hank Jennings (Chris Mulkey). Shelly quits her job at the Double R Diner to care for Leo at home, where she and Bobby live together. When Leo awakens from his catatonia and tries to kill Shelly, Bobby comes and fights with Leo. Shelly stabs Leo in the leg, and Leo wanders off into the woods. Shelly later asks Norma for her old job at the Double R Diner, which Norma gives back to her. Shelly later receives fragments of poetry from former FBI agent Windom Earle (Kenneth Welsh). Shelly later enters the Miss Twin Peaks contest. Bobby later proposes to her, but she says no because she is still married to Leo.

Leo is shot and murdered shortly after the events of the original series and autopsied by special agent Albert Rosenfield (Miguel Ferrer) on April 1, 1989; the cause had been five gunshots assumed by Rosenfield to have been fired by Earle, though tarantula bites had been present as well. Shelly and Bobby marry almost exactly one year later.

Shelly returned in the 2017 Twin Peaks series with Mädchen Amick reprising her role. Shelly and Bobby divorced at some point prior to the revival, and they have an adult daughter, Becky (Amanda Seyfried). Shelly first appears in the second episode, drinking with friends at the Roadhouse, where she expresses concern for Becky, who is married to Steven Burnett (Caleb Landry Jones), an unemployed, abusive drug addict. She later has a nostalgic moment with James Hurley (James Marshall). In the fifth episode, Shelly is shown still working at the Double R Diner. Becky comes in and begs her for money, and Shelly reluctantly gives her all of the money that she has. Her boss Norma Jennings (Peggy Lipton), who has been described as a 'surrogate mother' figure for Shelly, has been observing the situation, comforts Shelly and tells her that she needs to help her daughter while she still can. In the eleventh episode, while working at the Double R Diner, Shelly receives a phone call from a distressed Becky and runs out of the diner to go help her. When she arrives at Becky's trailer, her daughter snatches her keys and begins to drive off in her car. Shelly jumps onto the windshield until Becky flings her off. The owner of the trailer park, Carl Rodd (Harry Dean Stanton), gives her a ride to the Double R Diner as she calls Bobby to explain the situation. She and Bobby meet with Becky at the diner and make arrangements to protect her from Steven. As she hugs Becky she sees her new boyfriend Red (Balthazar Getty) - a drug dealer - outside the diner and kisses him. In the thirteenth episode, Shelly is working at the Double R Diner when Becky calls her expressing concern for Steven, as she hasn't seen him in two days. Shelly asks if she can call her later because she is working, and insists that Becky come to the diner so she can make her cherry pie.

=== In film ===
Shelly appears in the prequel films Twin Peaks: Fire Walk with Me (1992) and Twin Peaks: The Missing Pieces, the latter just consisting of unused footage from Fire Walk With Me. In Fire Walk With Me, Shelly is first seen working at the Double R Diner, when Norma asks her to assist Laura Palmer with the Meals on Wheels deliveries. When a distraught Laura tells Shelly that she cannot do the deliveries, Shelly is left to make the deliveries on her own. Later, Leo is shown verbally and physically abusing her, and forces her to wash the kitchen floor. When Bobby calls Leo, Shelly overhears the conversation and discovers that he owes him $5,000.

=== In literature ===
Shelly is referenced in the cookbook Damn Fine Cherry Pie: And Other Recipes from TV's Twin Peaks by Lindsey Bowden. Shelly is referenced in Jennifer Lynch's novel The Secret Diary of Laura Palmer. Told from the perspective of Laura Palmer, she wrote that she assumed that Shelly and Bobby were having an affair and discusses sleeping with Shelly's husband, Leo Johnson.

== Development ==
While the character's name is spelled Shelly in the script, some tie-in products of the time spell it Shelley, including the soundtrack album and the novel The Secret Diary of Laura Palmer.

=== Casting ===
Mädchen Amick originally auditioned for the role of Donna Hayward, which ultimately went to Lara Flynn Boyle. However, the creators of the show were so impressed by her that they created the role of Shelly specifically for her.

== Reception ==
In Pervert in the Pulpit: Morality in the Works of David Lynch, Jeff Johnson states that Shelly is one of the "salvageable characters" saying "Shelly, for instance, after so much abuse from Leo, gains a sense of self-confidence and a better self-image, giving up her scamming with Bobby and even entering the Miss Twin Peaks competition." Rolling Stone praised the distinctiveness of the character, stating that "Shelly Johnson was further away from the show's center than almost any of them. But that's kind of the point. Yes, she extricated herself from the high-school hell that consumed Laura by dropping out and getting married to brooding, drug-running trucker Leo Johnson. But that didn't save her from drudgery, boredom, betrayal, and abuse. It just moved the venue and raised the stakes."
