= Bone Eater =

American made-for-TV Movie directed by Jim Wynorski as Bob Robertson

- DVD cover
- Genre: Science fiction; horror
- Written by: Jim Wynorski
- Directed by: Jim Wynorski (as Bob Robertson)
- Starring: Bruce Boxleitner; Michael Horse; Clara Bryant
- Theme music composer: Chuck Cirino
- Country of origin: United States
- Original language: English

Production
- Producer: Paul Hertzberg
- Cinematography: Andrea V. Rossotto
- Editor: Marcus Manton
- Running time: 88 minutes
- Production company: CineTel Films

Original release
- Network: Syfy
- Release: February 9, 2008

Bone Eater is a 2008 American made-for-television monster movie directed and written by Jim Wynorski. It stars Bruce Boxleitner as a sheriff who must stop a Native American monster from destroying his town. It premiered on Syfy and was later released on DVD.

== Plot ==
An unscrupulous land developer, Dick Krantz, ignores the protests of Native Americans as he violates their ancestral burial grounds. The local sheriff, Steve Evans, is caught in the middle of the conflict, as he is a quarter Native American and 3/4 Caucasian. When one of Krantz's construction crews unearths an ancient relic, they unleash a giant skeletal monster that proceeds to kill everyone in its path. Evans must deal with his rebellious daughter, unhelpful bureaucrats, and Johnny Black Hawk, a Native American who agitates for violence. After consulting with the local chief, Storm Cloud, Evans learns he must locate the relic and use it in ritual combat against the monster. Once Sheriff Evans acquires the relic, Johnny Black Hawk attempts to take it from him and use it to get vengeance on the town; Evans is forced to kill him in self-defense. After donning war paint, Evans goes on to fight and ultimately defeat the Bone Eater.

== Cast ==
- Bruce Boxleitner as Sheriff Steve Evans
- Michael Horse as Chief Storm Cloud
- Adoni Maropis as Johnny Black Hawk
- Clara Bryant as Kelly Evans
- Gil Gerard as Jim "Big Jim" Burns
- Jennifer Lee Wiggins as Kaya
- Walter Koenig as Coogan
- William Katt as Dr. Boombas
- Roark Critchlow as Deputy Roberts
- Veronica Hamel as Commissioner Hayes
- John Callahan as Seth Pomeroy

== Release ==
CineTel Films announced Bone Eater in 2006. It premiered on Syfy on February 9, 2008, and Lionsgate released it on DVD on July 8, 2008.

== Reception ==
Scott Foy of Dread Central rated it 2/5 stars and wrote that the film would not "scare anyone except maybe the smallest of children". Foy criticized the story as "pointless and derivative" and the effects as cartoonish, though he stated that the monster gives Bone Eater "moments of wacky charm". David Johnson of DVD Verdict called it "astonishingly stupid" and described the title monster as "one of the most ridiculous CGI contraptions I've seen." Justin Felix of DVD Talk rated the film 1/5 stars and stated "it has a it's so bad you have to see it to believe it vibe." Bloody Disgusting rated the film 2.5/5 stars and called it "the ultimate Saturday morning mindwipe."

== See also ==
- List of Sci Fi Pictures original films
