= Benjamin Horne =

Ben Horne
- Twin Peaks character
- First appearance: "Pilot" (1990)
- Last appearance: "Part 17" (2017)
- Created by: Mark Frost, David Lynch
- Portrayed by: Richard Beymer

In-universe information
- Occupation: Hotel owner, businessman
- Family: Horne
- Spouse: Sylvia Horne
- Significant other: Catherine Martell
- Children: Audrey Horne; Johnny Horne; Donna Hayward
- Relatives: Jerry Horne (brother); Richard Horne (grandson)
- Nationality: American
- Date of birth: August 4, 1940

Benjamin Joseph Horne is a fictional character in the television series Twin Peaks, created by David Lynch and Mark Frost, portrayed by Richard Beymer. His middle and last names are based on department store owner Joseph Horne, founder of Horne's in Pittsburgh where Mark Frost attended college, while his and his brother Jerry's first names are based on the ice cream brand Ben & Jerry's.

The richest man in Twin Peaks, Horne is an archetypal 1980s cutthroat businessman, whose greatest desire in life appears to be the acquisition of wealth. As the series progressed, he was revealed, like many of the show's other characters, to have a hidden side; beneath his ruthless, greedy facade, he is a lonely, deeply-depressed man who is disappointed with how his family and life turned out.

For the first sixteen episodes of the series, he is one of the primary antagonists not directly linked to the series' main storyline of the Laura Palmer murder. He is consistently under suspicion for Laura's murder, of which he is wholly innocent, while never being suspected of the myriad criminal activities of which he is actually guilty.

Up until the revelation of Laura's true killer, Horne was used by the writers as a red herring to prevent spoilers from leaking out; at least two scenes were filmed to lead people to believe that Horne was the real killer, so that the true identity of the killer could remain a secret.

== Character background ==
Ben Horne is one of the two richest and most powerful individuals of Twin Peaks. Per Sheriff Harry Truman, Horne "owns half the town." He owns and runs The Great Northern Hotel, the town's only apparent travel lodgings. The Great Northern also acts, on occasion, as a de facto town hall, and the only place in Twin Peaks suitable for a wedding reception, making it one of the hubs of the community. In addition to the Great Northern, Ben owns and runs Horne's, the town's only department store, and One Eyed Jacks, a casino/brothel just over the Canada–United States border. His would-be monopoly on the town's economy is challenged only by Josie Packard, the owner of the Packard Saw Mill, one of the few major businesses in town which Horne doesn't own. At the outset of the series, Ben has been involved in an affair for some time with Catherine Martell. The relationship is part of Ben's intricate plot to kill her, destroy the mill, become the beneficiary of her life insurance, and take sole ownership of the land on which the mill sits, which he intends to turn into a luxury country club.

Ben is depicted as both extremely intelligent and mercilessly cutthroat. He acts as a contrast to the simple people of Twin Peaks, while he lacks their folk wisdom, he is nonetheless extremely intelligent, worldly, and well-read, capable of quoting Shakespearean sonnets on cue. His usual attire further serves to distance him from the town. While the majority of the populace of Twin Peaks dress in western wear or clothing popular in the 1950s, Horne dresses in fashionable double breasted suits and designer track suits, both staples of 1980s fashion; upon first seeing him, Agent Dale Cooper singles him out as a "glad-handing dandy."

Ben and his family live with him in the owner's quarters at the Great Northern. His wife, Sylvia, and son, Johnny, only appear briefly in the original series. Sylvia is a put-upon trophy wife, while Johnny is a developmentally disabled 27-year-old who spends his days playing cowboys and Indians. Ben also has a brother, Jerry Horne, who acts as his business partner, emissary, and best friend. His teenaged daughter Audrey is both his pride and joy and the thorn in his side. Like him, she is intelligent, business-savvy and ruthless, though also rebellious and delights in embarrassing him with outrageous public stunts.

Ben is very close to his private attorney, Leland Palmer, who has worked for him for at least five years prior to the start of the series. Ben takes a particular shine to Leland's daughter, Laura, who as a child encompassed all the qualities lacking in Audrey: Quiet, good natured, and sweet. For this reason, Ben showers Laura with attention, clandestinely giving her presents through Leland, who agrees to the arrangement as it both makes Laura happy and makes Leland look good in his daughter's eyes. As Laura grows older, Ben develops romantic feelings for her, and he sees in her all of the possibilities his own life once held. Her photo takes a place of honor on his desk, while there is none of Audrey to be seen. Ben and Laura have a torrid affair shortly before Laura's death, after Laura, without Ben's knowledge, comes to work at One Eyed Jacks. The relationship quickly falls apart, as Laura does not really have feelings for Horne, but wants only the thrill of sleeping with a wealthy, older man. Before she dies, Laura threatens to expose the affair to the entire town.

== Role on series ==
=== 1989–1991 series ===
At the start of the series, Horne is recruiting Norwegian businessmen to invest in his plans for Ghostwood, an elaborate country club and planned community that would take the place of Twin Peaks' scenic Ghostwood Forest. His plans are interrupted when Laura Palmer, the daughter of Ben's lawyer, Leland Palmer, is found murdered. The murder both puts Leland out of commission and gives Audrey the opportunity to paint Twin Peaks as a dangerous place, frightening away her father's potential investors.

As the first season progresses, Horne attempts to juggle his various personal and business problems in light of Laura's murder. While putting on a brave face and acting on behalf of the stricken Palmers to retrieve Laura's body and transport it for burial, Horne's vulnerability is revealed when Audrey confronts him with knowledge of his affair with Laura.

Following Laura's funeral, Horne pours all of his energies into obtaining the Packard Sawmill land, some of the most valuable real estate in Twin Peaks. He hires local drug runner Leo Johnson to burn down the mill with Catherine trapped inside, and then obtains the services of hitman Hank Jennings to murder Leo so that no one will ever know the two worked together. Horne's plan goes terribly awry, though: The mill doesn't completely burn; Catherine's body is never found, which prevents Horne from collecting on her life insurance policy (a matter further complicated by Catherine having made an intentional clerical error to foil Horne in the event of her death); Leo survives being shot by Hank; and Audrey is kidnapped by the staff of One Eyed Jacks, who intend to use her to extort Horne for millions of dollars while simultaneously enacting a hostile takeover of the business. Horne begrudgingly gives Cooper the requested ransom money, then hires Hank to trail Cooper, kill everyone involved in retrieving Audrey, and bring back Audrey and the money himself. Ultimately, Cooper himself rescues Audrey and returns to Twin Peaks with both her and the money intact.

Shortly after Audrey's safe return, a misunderstanding in a clue provided to Cooper by Mike leads to Horne being arrested for the murder of Laura Palmer. Horne is left with the incompetent Jerry as his lawyer, his only advice being, "Get another lawyer." Simultaneously, Catherine Martell re-surfaces, alive and well, having survived the fire. Posing as a foreign investor, she first arranges for Horne to purchase the Mill Land and Ghostwood from Josie with a bogus check, and then blackmails him into signing over Josie's 50% to her in exchange for an alibi as to his whereabouts the night Laura Palmer was murdered. Desperate, Horne signs over his deed to Catherine, who then reneges on her promise to provide him an alibi. Horne is left trapped in jail, where he begins to break down and reminisce about his childhood.

Eventually, Horne is used as a pawn to draw out the real killer; Cooper brings him to a meeting of suspects at the Roadhouse, which is also attended by the Great Northern's elderly room service waiter. The waiter, under the influence of The Giant, identifies Leland Palmer, under the influence of the demonic spirit Bob, as Laura's killer. In order to trap Leland, Cooper lies and tells everyone that he has positively identified Ben Horne as the real killer, and then gives Leland permission to accompany Horne to the jail to act as his counsel. Leland/Bob, unaware of the ruse, accompany Cooper and Horne to the jailhouse; just as Cooper and Sheriff Truman are about to lead Horne into an interrogation room, they hold him back and throw Leland/Bob inside, trapping him. The revelation shocks Horne, who can only mutter "Leland..." before he is allowed to go home.

Horne slips into a deep depression before ultimately suffering a nervous breakdown and a psychotic break. He becomes convinced that he is Confederate General Robert E. Lee, leading the South in a victorious campaign against the Union. His psychiatrist, Dr. Lawrence Jacoby, theorizes that Horne is at least partially aware of reality, and that his fantasy is an attempt to reverse his recent misfortunes and start anew. Jerry, Audrey, and Bobby Briggs, under Jacoby's direction, serve to enable Horne's fantasy up to a surrender of the Union at Appomattox. Horne suffers a blackout, from which he awakens with a desire to atone for his past sins, whilst simultaneously seeking peaceful revenge on Catherine. To meet both of these ends, he launches an environmentalist campaign to prevent Catherine from re-building the mill or building anything in Ghostwood; he learns that the forest is the habitat of an endangered species, the "Pine Weasel", and manages to get the majority of the town on board to block any of Catherine's real estate developments. He makes a genuine attempt to atone for his past crimes, gives up smoking, and begins building a close relationship with Audrey, to whom he begins to teach the family business.

As part of his "new life," Horne attempts to make amends with Mrs. Hayward, with whom he had an affair 17 years before, an affair which produced Donna Hayward; Ben wants to both make up for his indiscretions with Mrs. Hayward and get to know the daughter he never had. In the series finale, Horne comes to the Hayward home to reveal everything to a heartbroken Donna. Enraged, Doc Hayward, Donna's father, punches him, resulting in Horne splitting his head open on a piece of fireplace equipment.

=== 2017 revival ===
Benjamin Horne returns 25 years later in the 2017 revival, where he is still the owner of the Great Northern. He and Sylvia appear to be acrimoniously divorced, and Johnny lives with Sylvia. Horne still wears his wedding ring and resists a flirtation with his secretary Beverly Paige, but agrees to date Beverly after a bitter argument with Sylvia. It is unknown whether he has a relationship with Audrey or Donna, as Audrey's whereabouts are unknown and Donna does not appear in the third season. He also employs James Hurley as a security guard at the Great Northern.

Horne is deeply troubled about his grandson Richard (Audrey's son), a violent and angry drug dealer. He cut off contact with Richard several years before the events of the third season. After Richard terrorizes Sylvia and Johnny and robs Sylvia's house, Sylvia asks Horne for money and threatens to call her lawyer if he does not comply. When Richard kills a young boy and brutally beats a witness, Horne pays the witness' medical bills and the cost of the boy's funeral.

Although the fate of Ghostwood and the pine weasel campaign is not revealed in the show, the book Twin Peaks: The Final Dossier reveals that Horne sold a portion of the land initially earmarked for Ghostwood to a private prison. In addition, Horne helped his brother Jerry start a cannabis business, which reportedly tripled the Horne businesses' total revenue.

== Red herring for Laura's killer ==
At least two scenes were filmed to lead fans to believe that Ben Horne was Laura's killer:

- In one episode, Mike takes Cooper to the Great Northern, where he claims the killer is. When Ben Horne approaches Cooper and Mike, Mike has what amounts to an epileptic seizure and says that the killer's scent is on Ben. Only after Leland is revealed as the killer does the scene make sense and exonerate Ben—Leland and Ben had just been alone together in a room.
- More blatantly, a scene was filmed for Episode 14 where Horne is revealed as Bob's host. The scene was filmed so that it would spread false rumors and draw people away from the possibility of Leland being the killer. The scene plays out exactly as the one originally broadcast, wherein Leland looks into a mirror to reveal the face of Bob before killing Maddy; however, here, Ben Horne is in the Palmer house, and it is he who murders Maddy. The scene was never broadcast on TV and is not included in the Gold Box DVD set.
