= Harry S. Truman (Twin Peaks) =

Twin Peaks character

- Twin Peaks character
- First appearance: "Pilot" (1990)
- Last appearance: "Episode 29" (1991)
- Created by: Mark Frost and David Lynch
- Portrayed by: Michael Ontkean
- Duration: 1990–1991

In-universe information
- Gender: Male
- Occupation: Sheriff
- Nationality: American
- Birth date: May 13, 1950

Sheriff Harry S. Truman is a fictional character and supporting protagonist in the television series Twin Peaks (1990–1991) and deleted scenes from the prequel film Twin Peaks: Fire Walk with Me (1992). He was created by showrunners Mark Frost and David Lynch, and portrayed by Michael Ontkean.

Harry Truman served as the sheriff of Twin Peaks, Washington after his father and older brother. In 1989, he and FBI Special Agent Dale Cooper lead the investigation into the murder of high schooler Laura Palmer, uncovering several mysteries around the town pertaining both to organized crime and the supernatural.

Ontkean declined to reprise the role for the third season (2017) due to his retirement. As such, Robert Forster was brought in to play Harry's brother, Frank Truman, who returned to the sheriff's position in Twin Peaks after Harry grew ill.

== Development ==
Casting Truman was a difficult process according to Mark Frost, with David Strathairn and Robert Forster being the first people considered to play the role, the latter playing Truman's brother in the 2017 revival series. Ontkean was cast in the role a week before shooting. Ray Wise also auditioned for the role, but was cast as Leland Palmer instead.

Truman's original name in the pilot was Daniel Steadman. The character shares his name with President Harry S. Truman, a portrait of whom can be seen in Sheriff Truman's office, and with Harry R. Truman, the colorful owner of a lodge at Spirit Lake, Washington, who was killed in the 1980 eruption of Mount St. Helens.

== Appearances ==
=== In television ===
==== Twin Peaks ====
Harry S. Truman is the sheriff at the Twin Peaks Sheriff's Department. Shortly after the homecoming queen Laura Palmer is murdered, FBI agent Dale Cooper comes to Twin Peaks to solve the case, and the two of them quickly become friends and work together closely, although Truman is initially startled by Cooper's idiosyncratic nature. Truman is secretly seeing Josie Packard, whom to their knowledge, no one knows about. When questioning Josie about her connection with Laura Palmer, Cooper suspects Truman and Josie's relationship due to his body language, which Truman confirms is true. Josie expresses her concerns about Catherine and Ben to Truman, believing that they killed her husband Andrew and that they are going to kill her next.

Truman has an ongoing feud with Cooper's FBI partner Albert Rosenfield, Truman being immediately bothered by Albert's difficult behaviour. In a fight between Albert and Dr. Hayward about releasing Laura Palmer's body, Truman punches Albert as he lands on Laura's body. Truman at one point takes Albert by the collar, frustrated with Albert insulting him, but is calmed down by Albert saying his motives are built on the foundation of love, placing his hand on Truman's shoulder and saying "I love you, Sheriff Truman," and leaving. Truman and Albert are friendly for the remainder of the show.

Cooper gets shot at the end of the season 1 finale, and Albert concludes that the shooter was Josie Packard. Cooper initially hesitates to tell Truman this, but Albert pushes him to do so. Truman runs to Josie after he finds out, seeing the dead body of Thomas Eckhardt whom Josie killed, and commands Josie to put her gun down. Josie then collapses on her bed, with Truman crying in her arms, realizing that she had died. Truman starts heavily drinking in the next episode, struck with grief over Josie's death, but is reminded by Cooper of Josie's criminal past.

Truman and Cooper spend the remainder of the second season hunting down Windom Earle, who kidnaps the winner of the Miss Twin Peaks contest, Annie Blackburn. Truman and Cooper track down Annie, finding the extradimensional Black Lodge where Cooper spends the season 2 finale exploring while Truman waits for him. After an entire day, Truman finds Cooper and Annie outside the Black Lodge and brings Cooper to his hotel room as Annie is brought to the hospital. Cooper wakes up the next day, and Truman is immediately startled by Cooper's demeanours, which we later learn is because Cooper's doppelgänger is the one who escaped the Black Lodge.

=== In film ===
Truman is not present in the prequel film Twin Peaks: Fire Walk with Me, but is featured very briefly in the deleted scenes for the movie, which was released as Twin Peaks: The Missing Pieces. Hawk informs Truman and Andy that Bernie has come into Twin Peaks from Canada, a person who was smuggling cocaine into Twin Peaks. In another scene, receptionist Lucy tells Truman and Andy that Josie has heard a prowler outside her house, with Truman leaving Andy to watch the station.

=== In literature ===
During the second season of Twin Peaks, Simon & Schuster's Pocket Books division released three official tie-in books, with Truman being mentioned in the third book that was released at the time, Welcome to Twin Peaks: An Access Guide to the Town. The book gives confirmation on his birth date, and places him as the 10th player in the Twin Peaks High School football team in 1968, saying he had the "best completion record in the Tri-Country Area for two straight seasons."

Truman is also mentioned in Mark Frost's official tie-in book The Secret History of Twin Peaks. It explains that his character name had come from President Harry S. Truman, and that he was promoted to the Twin Peaks sheriff in 1981.

=== In popular culture ===
In 1990, during the height of Twin Peaks' popularity, there was a Saturday Night Live sketch parodying the show with Kevin Nealon portraying Sheriff Truman. Truman tells Cooper, played by Kyle MacLachlan in the sketch, that Leo Johnson had confessed to murdering Laura Palmer. Cooper ignores him, insisting that they go to the brothel One Eyed Jacks, with Truman going so far as to showing Cooper a tape recording of Leo killing Laura, with Cooper ignoring him again.

== Reception ==
The character has received praise from both critics and fans alike. Alex Bledsoe of Reactor calls Sheriff Truman "diligent, intelligent and above all patient with his fellow lawmen, and incorruptibly courageous with the villains." Writer Sean T. Collins of Rolling Stone ranked Harry Truman at the 9th best character of the show, stating "He's the very definition of a supporting character, which is why it always comes as a surprise to see Michael Ontkean billed second only to Kyle MacLachlan in Twin Peaks' iconic opening credits. But the good Sheriff meant way more to the show than just being Agent Cooper's backup. He was dependable, open-minded, possessed of a certain Springsteen-esque sexiness, and exhibiting none of the provincialism or authoritarianism we'd come to expect from small-town cops on TV; Truman also punctured the idea that Lynch and Frost were simply taking too-easy swipes at Main Street USA. There was goodness in places like Twin Peaks after all, even in positions of power — and Harry was Exhibit A."
