= Michael Horse =

American actor from California, U.S.

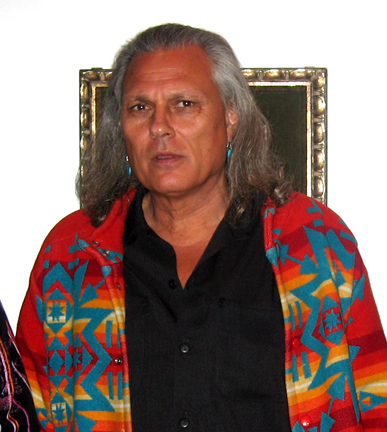
- Horse in 2006
- Born: Michael James Heinrich; 1949 (age 76–77); Los Angeles County, California, U.S.
- Occupation: Actor
- Years active: 1981–present
- Spouse: Pennie Opal Plant
- Website: gatheringtribes.com/pages/about-michael-horse

Michael Horse (Michael James Heinrich, born 1949) is an American actor, painter, and jeweler. He is best known for playing Deputy Tommy 'Hawk' Hill on Twin Peaks.

== Background and education ==
Michael James Heinrich was born in Los Angeles County, California in 1949. Biographies have also given his birthplace as in or near Tucson, Arizona. His parents were Nancie Bellen Posten and George Heinrich, who married in 1953. Angela Aleiss wrote, "Heinrich listed his parents as Austrian." Biographies have also described his mother as being Swedish and George Heinrich being his adopted father.

Horse "describes himself as half-Indian and part Zuni, Mescalero, Yaqui and Hispanic with a touch of Swedish…." In 2017, American art writer Daniel Grant wrote, "Horse has refused to apply to any one tribe for enrollment" in an article in which Horse stated that he belonged to "three nations... I'm one-eighth this and one-eighth that. I'm tired of explaining myself in fractions. I know who I am."

== Career ==
Horse's film debut came in the role of Tonto in the 1981 film The Legend of the Lone Ranger, which was a commercial failure. Before taking the role, Horse had been concerned that the character might be perceived as a stereotype. However, Horse later said that the fact that the film was not a big hit enabled him to launch a career as a character actor without being stuck in the role of Tonto.

After appearing in David Lynch's short film The Cowboy and the Frenchman (1988), Horse portrayed Deputy Hawk, a police officer, in Lynch's TV series Twin Peaks (1990–91). He also acted in Passenger 57 (1992), House of Cards (1993), the 1990s version of the television series The Untouchables (1993), and North of 60 (1995–97). He also appeared in the Thanks episode "Thanksgiving" in 1999, portraying Squanto. He appeared as Deputy Owen Blackwood in four episodes of the first season of Roswell (1999). Horse also appeared as Sheriff Tskany in The X-Files episode "Shapes" in 1994. In 1999, Horse guest starred on Walker, Texas Ranger in the episode "Team Cherokee" as John Red Cloud, the owner of a Native American NASCAR racing team and a friend of the titular character, Texas Ranger Cordell Walker (Chuck Norris).

Horse portrayed American Indian Movement (AIM) activist Dennis Banks in the 1994 film Lakota Woman: Siege at Wounded Knee. Eight years later, he lent his voice to Little Creek's friend in Spirit: Stallion of the Cimarron. He portrayed Mike Proudfoot on Sons of Tucson. In 1995 he portrayed Dirty Bob in the Western film Riders in the Storm. He played the character Jindoga in Hawkeye. In 2017, Horse reprised his role as Deputy Hawk in the third season of TV series Twin Peaks.

He also portrayed Twamie Ullulaq in the seventh season of The Blacklist in 2020.

== Personal life ==
He is married to Pennie Opal Plant.

== Filmography ==
=== Film ===
Year	Title	Role	Notes
1981	The Legend of the Lone Ranger	Tonto	
1982	The Avenging	Josuah	
1986	The Check Is in the Mail...	Pool attendant	
1987	Buckeye and Blue	Cherokee Bill	
1987	Love at Stake	Medicine Man	
1988	Rented Lips	Bobby Leaping Mouse	
1988	The Cowboy and the Frenchman	Broken Feather	short film
1989	Deadly Weapon	Indian Joe	
1992	Twin Peaks: Fire Walk with Me	Deputy Hawk	Scenes deleted
1992	Passenger 57	Forget	
1993	House of Cards	Stoker	
1995	Riders in the Storm	Dirty Bob	
1996	American Strays	Lead Cop	
1996	Navajo Blues	Begay	
1998	Shattered Illusions	Eddie	
1998	Star of Jaipur	Colonel Ironwood	
1999	In the Blue Ground	Andrew One Sky	
2001	Dirt	Native American Convict	
2002	Spirit: Stallion of the Cimarron	Little Creek's Friend	Voice
2002	Birdseye	Pete Longshadow	
2008	Turok: Son of Stone	Lead Raider / Chief	direct-to-video
2013	Skinwalker Ranch	Ahote	
2014	Twin Peaks: The Missing Pieces	Deputy Tommy 'Hawk' Hill	
2014	Behind the Door of a Secret Girl	Mr. Thomson	
2014	Lights Camera Bullshit	The Narrator	
2017	Dead Ant	Bigfoot	
2020	The Call of the Wild	Edenshaw	

=== Television ===
Year	Title	Role	Notes
1983	It Takes Two	Frank White	Episode: "Mother and Child Reunion"
1985	Knight Rider	Jonathan Eagle	Episode: "Burial Ground"
1986	Amazing Stories	Male Friend / Indian	2 episodes
1988	Longarm	Vasquez	Television film
1988	The French as Seen by...	Broken Feather	2 episodes
1989	Paradise	Walking Water	Episode: "Burial Ground"
1989–1991	Twin Peaks	Deputy Tommy 'Hawk' Hill	28 episodes
1990	New Kids on the Block	Various	14 episodes
1991	P.S. I Luv U	Russell Grayfox	Episodes: "Unmarried... with Children"
1991	The Torkelsons	David Blackwing	Episode: "Thanksgivingsomething"
1992–1993	Wild West C.O.W.-Boys of Moo Mesa	J.R.	Voice, 8 episodes
1993	Mighty Max	Yona-Ya-In	Episode: "The Maxnificent Seven"
1993	The Untouchables	Agent George Steelman	19 episodes
1994	The X-Files	Sheriff Charles Tskany	Episode: "Shapes"
1994	Lakota Woman: Siege at Wounded Knee	Dennis Banks	Television film
1994	Problem Child	Various	13 episodes
1994–1996	Gargoyles	Peter Maza / Carlos Maza	Voice, 4 episodes
1995	Hawkeye	Jindoga	Episode: "Vengeance Is Mine"
1995	500 Nations	Voice	3 episodes
1995	Happily Ever After: Fairy Tales for Every Child	Sharp Flint	Voice, episode: "Snow White"
1995	Life with Louie	Cousin Joey	Episode: "The Fourth Thursday in November"
1995–1997	North of 60	Andrew One Sky	19 episodes
1996	The Real Adventures of Jonny Quest	Various	4 episodes
1996	The Incredible Hulk	Jefferson Whitedeer	Episode: "And the Wind Cries... Wendigo"
1996, 1997	Adventures from the Book of Virtues	Waukewa's Father, Strong Wind	Voice, 2 episodes
1997	Duckman	Big Chief Fancy Pants	Voice, episode: "Role with It"
1997	The Legend of Calamity Jane	Quanna Parker	Voice, 13 episodes
1997, 1999	Superman: The Animated Series	Ubu, Sky Sentry Operator	Voice, 2 episodes
1999	Walker, Texas Ranger	John Red Cloud	2 episodes
1999	Thanks	Dissquantum / Squanto	Episode: "Thanksgiving"
1999	Roswell	Owen Blackwood	4 episodes
2000	The Wild Thornberrys	Wildlife Ranger Sam Rainwater	Voice, episode: "Pack of Thornberrys"
2000	Lost in Oz	Ponca	Television film
2000, 2002	Malcolm in the Middle	Steve / Security Guy	2 episodes
2001	Dream Storm	Andrew One Sky	Television film
2001	Jackie Chan Adventures	Muntab Leader	Voice, episode: "Lost City of the Muntabs"
2001	Kristin	Jonathan Stillwater	Episode: "The Secret"
2002	ChalkZone	Bug O Nay Geeshig	Voice, television short
2004	What's New, Scooby-Doo?	Leon Strongfeather	Voice, episode: "New Mexico, Old Monster"
2004	All Grown Up!	Pizza Dude	Voice, episode: "Memoirs of a Finster"
2004	JAG	Wolf Tillicum	Episode: "Whole New Ball Game"
2007	Bone Eater	Storm Cloud	Television film
2010	Sons of Tucson	Mike Proudfoot	3 episodes
2012	Young Justice	Holling Longshadow	Voice, episode: "Beneath"
2014	Hell on Wheels	Native American	Episode: "Bear Man"
2017	Twin Peaks	Deputy Chief Tommy 'Hawk' Hill	14 episodes
2017	Godless	Chief Narrienta	2 episodes
2019	Claws	Mac Lovestone / Mac Locklear	8 episodes
2020	The Blacklist	Twamie Ullulaq	Episode: "Twamie Ullulaq (No. 126)"
2022	Motherland: Fort Salem	The Marshal	3 episodes
