= Filmmaking =

Process of making a motion picture

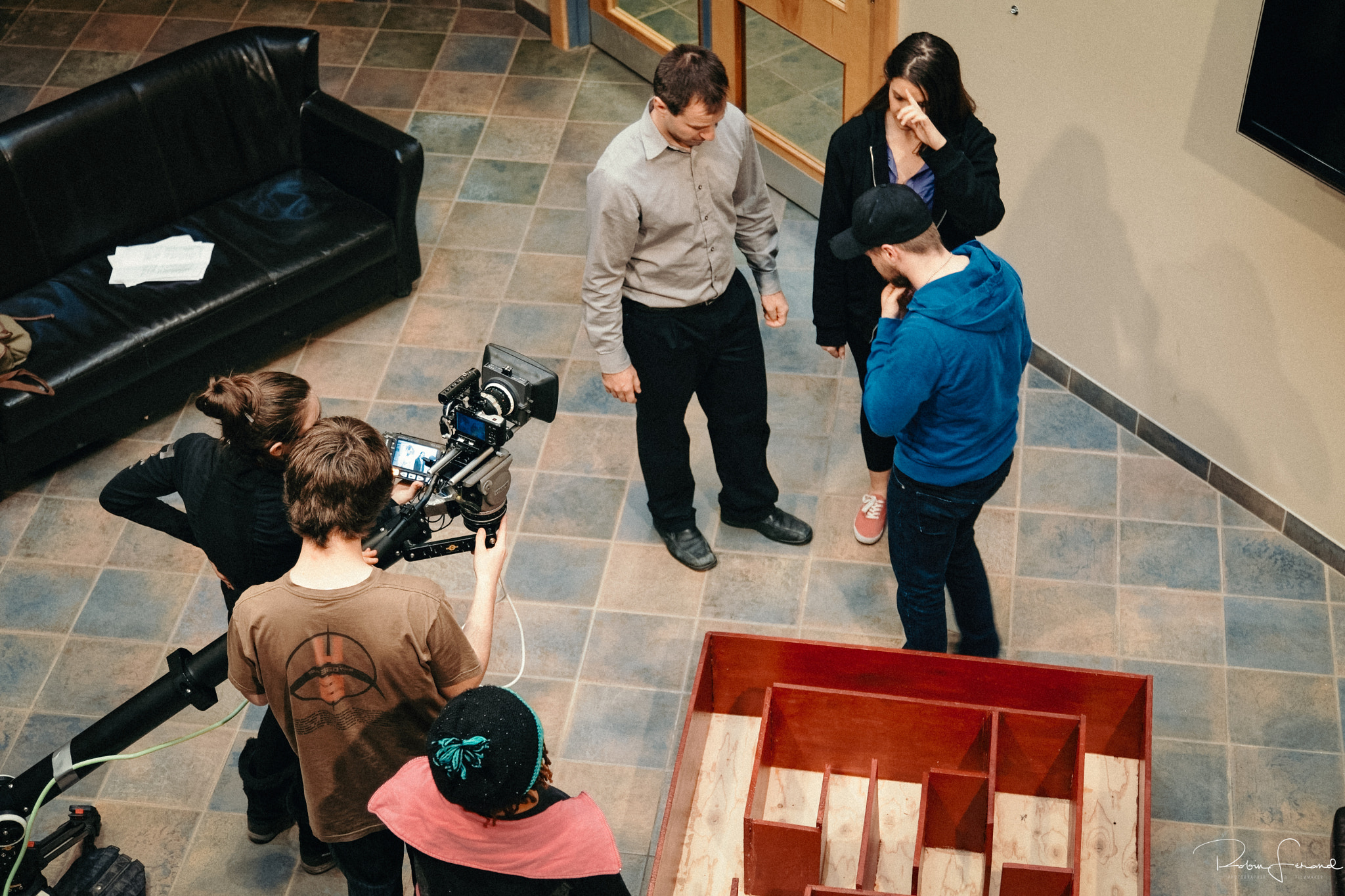
Film crew and cast members working together during principal photography

Filmmaking, or film production, is the process of creating a motion picture, for example, feature films, episodic series for streaming and network broadcasting, commercials and advertisements, animations, music videos, documentaries, or any other filmed product. It involves a number of distinct stages, including an initial story idea or commission, followed by screenwriting, casting, pre-production, shooting, sound recording, post-production, and screening the finished product before an audience, which may result in a film release distribution and exhibition. Generally, the process is nonlinear, in that the filmmaker typically shoots the script out of sequence, repeats shots as needed, and puts them together through editing later. Filmmaking takes place in a variety of economic, social, and political contexts around the world and uses a wide range of technologies and cinematic techniques. While originally films were recorded on photographic film, most modern filmmaking is now digital.

The production of a film typically consists of five major stages. The first is development, where the initial idea for the film is explored, rights to intellectual property (IP) may be secured, the screenplay is written, and financing is obtained. This is followed by pre-production, where the arrangements and preparations for the shoot are made, including hiring cast and crew, scouting and securing locations, and constructing sets. The third stage is production, which is when the raw footage and other elements of the film are recorded.

After filming is complete, the project enters post-production. In this stage, the raw footage is edited, sound is mixed, visual effects are added, and a musical score is composed and recorded. The final stage is distribution, where the finished film is released to audiences. This involves marketing and promotion, and the film may be shown in cinemas/movie theaters, released on home video, or made available through streaming services, cable, or television. Some filmmakers operate outside of the mainstream system and engage in independent filmmaking, which has become more accessible with the advent of affordable digital technology and streaming platforms.

== Production stages ==
Film production consists of five major stages:

- Development: Ideas for the film are created, rights to existing intellectual properties are purchased, and the screenplay is written. Financing for the project is sought and obtained.
- Pre-production: Arrangements and preparations are made for the shoot, such as hiring cast and film crew, selecting locations, and constructing sets.
- Production: The raw footage and other elements of the film are recorded during the film shoot, including principal photography.
- Post-production: The images, sound, and visual effects of the recorded film are edited and combined into a finished product.
- Distribution: The completed film is distributed, marketed, and screened in cinemas and released on home video to be viewed at home.

=== Development ===
The development stage contains both general and specific components. Each film studio has a yearly retreat where their top creative executives meet about a variety of areas and topics they wish to explore through collaborations with producers and screenwriters, and then ultimately, directors, actors, and actresses. They choose trending topics from the media and real life, as well as other sources, to determine their yearly agenda. For example, in a year when action is popular, they may wish to explore that topic in one or more movies. Sometimes, they purchase the rights to articles, bestselling novels, plays, the remaking of older films, stories with some basis in real life through a person or event, a video game, fairy tale, comic book, or graphic novel. Likewise, research through surveys may inform their decisions. They may have had blockbusters from their previous year and wish to explore a sequel. They will additionally acquire a completed and independently financed and produced film.

Studios hold general meetings with producers and screenwriters about original story ideas. "It's become a lot more inclusive and expansive," a studio executive told TheWrap. “What used to happen was films were greenlit before the committee even met; it wasn't a collaborative process. Now you have three or four meetings. We beat it up quite a bit before we greenlight it." Studio executives can no longer green light one-third of their movies based on gut reaction to a project, Producers Guild Co-chief Hawk Koch recalled: "There's not anybody who makes movies because their gut tells them to do it anymore," Koch said. "It's a focus group."

The executives return from the retreat with fairly well-established instructions. They spread these concepts through the industry community, especially to producers they have deals with (traditional studios will have those producers in offices on their lots). Also, agents for screenwriters are made aware. This results in a pairing of producers with writers, where they develop a "take", a basic story idea that utilizes the concept given by studio executives. Often it is a competition with several pairings meeting with studio executives and "pitching" their "take." Very few writing jobs are from original ideas brought to studios by producers or writers. Completed original screenplays, referred to as "specs," can make big news when they sell. However, these make up a small portion of movies that are ultimately produced, as projects based on existing IPs are seen as being "safer" by most studios.

Once the producer and writer have sold their approach to the desired subject matter, they begin to work. However, many writers and producers usually pass before a particular concept is realized in a way that is awarded a green light to production. Although it varies by project, on average, it takes several years to produce a film. According to Xavier Luis Salinas, a line producer and unit production manager, “While in production, schedules can change at the turn of a dime, and you have to be ready to pivot right then and there. From the time you develop a script to a shooting script, you are looking at one to three years."

Writers have different styles and creative processes; some have stronger track records than others. Because of this, how the development process proceeds from there and how much detail a writer returns to the studio to divulge before beginning writing can vary greatly. Screenwriters are often protected by the union, the Writers Guild of America (WGA). As of May 2025, the WGA allows a screenwriter to contract for a First Draft and a Revision. In April 2026, the WGA was negotiating a deal with studios and streaming services to increase minimum payments for writers, improve the union's health plan, and more. Preliminary discussions are minimal with studio executives but might be quite detailed with the producers.

Next, a screenwriter writes a screenplay, typically over a period of several months; however, every writer's process and speed varies. Deadlines are in their contracts, but historically there has been little pressure to adhere to them, given the "better late and great" rationale—though Warner Bros. attempted a crack down on screenwriters' late delivery dates in 2010. The screenwriter may rewrite the script several times to improve dramatization, clarity, structure, characters, dialogue, and overall style.

A finished script undergoes script coverage, where it is analyzed and graded before a report is written up (typically by interns or entry-level assistants or readers) to be given to higher-ups (producers, agents, and executives). Coverage is a way for young screenwriters to be read and may occur via agencies, studios, production companies, or a paid script coverage service or company.

The studio is the film distributor which, at an early stage, attempts to choose a slate of concepts that are likely to have market appeal and find potential financial success. Hollywood distributors consider factors such as the film genre, the target audience and assumed audience, the historical success of similar films, the actors who might appear in the film, and potential directors. All these factors imply a certain appeal of the film to a possible audience. Not all films make a profit from the theatrical release alone, however, the studio mainly targets the opening weekend and the second weekend to make most domestic profits. How long a film stays in cinemas depends largely on box office performance. Occasionally, a film called a "word of mouth film" does not market strongly, but its success spreads by word of mouth. It slowly gains its audience. These are special circumstances, but popular films may remain in theaters for months, while a typical run is closer to 30 to 45 days, which became the new norm following theater closures due to the COVID-19 pandemic—prior to which the standard theatrical run was 90 day. Further earnings result from pay television purchases, foreign market purchases and DVD sales to establish worldwide distribution gross of a film.

Once a screenplay is greenlit, directors and actors are attached and the film proceeds into the pre-production stage, although sometimes development and pre-production stages will overlap. Projects that fail to obtain a green light may have protracted difficulties in making the transition to pre-production and enter a phase referred to as development hell for an extended period of time or until developmental turnaround. However, the average produced script can spend five to seven years in development.

Like almost any business venture, financing a film project deals with the management and procurement of financial resources to cover production costs. It includes the dynamics of the assets required to fund the filmmaking and the liabilities incurred during the filmmaking over the time period from early development through the management of profits and losses after distribution under conditions of different degrees of uncertainty and risk. The practical aspects of filmmaking finance can also be defined as the science of the money management of all phases involved in filmmaking. Film finance aims to price assets based on their risk level and their expected rate of return based upon anticipated profits and protection against losses.

For major studios, the average cost to produce a movie is about $65 million. The total cost to make a film depends on several factors, including its genre. On average, the most expensive movie genres are adventure, sci-fi, animation, and fantasy. Conversely, genres like music-based, horror, and romance typically have smaller average budgets. Also, finding funding generally takes longer for independent films, since they do not have that backing of a major studio.

=== Pre-production ===
Pre-production typically takes three to six months. In pre-production, every step of actually creating the film is carefully designed and planned. This is the phase for narrowing down all the options of the production. It is where all the planning takes place before the camera rolls and sets the overall vision of the project. Filmmaker Roger Corman said, "Take all the time you need in preproduction because you don’t want to be solving problems during shooting that you could’ve solved before shooting". The production company will establish a production office, which provides space for various crew members to work together. The film is pre-visualized by the director and may be storyboarded with the help of illustrators and concept artists. A production budget is drawn up to plan expenditures for the film. For major productions, insurance is procured to protect against accidents. Pre-production also includes working out the shoot location and casting process. The Producer hires a Line Manager or a Production Manager to create the schedule and budget for the film.

The nature of the film, and the budget, determine the size and type of crew used during filmmaking. Many Hollywood blockbusters employ a cast and crew of hundreds or thousands, while a low-budget, independent film may be made by a "skeleton crew" of eight or nine (or fewer).

==== Crew positions ====
Common positions of a film crew include:

- Storyboard artist: The storyboard artist creates visual images to help the director and production designer communicate their ideas to the production team.
- Director: The director turns a script into a movie. They are primarily responsible for the overall storytelling, creative decisions, and acting of the film.
  - Assistant director (AD): The AD manages the shooting schedule and logistics of the production, among other tasks. There are several types of AD, each with different responsibilities.
- Film producer: The producer helps initiate and oversee the development of films by securing funding, working with the director, and hiring the cast and crew.
  - Unit production manager (UPM): The UPM manages the production budget and production schedule. They also report, on behalf of the production office, to the studio executives or financiers of the film.
    - Location manager: The location manager finds and manages film locations. Many movies feature segments that are shot in the controllable environment of a studio sound stage, while outdoor sequences call for filming on location.
- Production designer: The production designer creates the visual conception of the film, working with the art director, who manages the art department that makes production sets.
  - Costume designer: The costume designer creates the clothing for the characters in the film, working closely with the actors and other departments.
  - Makeup and hair designer: This designer works closely with the costume designer to create a specific look for a character.
- Casting director (CD): The CD finds actors to fill the parts in the script. This normally requires actors to partake in an audition, either live in front of the casting director or in front of one or more cameras.
  - Choreographer: The choreographer creates and coordinates the film's movement and/or dance(s)—the latter typically being for musicals. Some films also credit a fight choreographer.
- Director of photography (DOP): The DOP is the head of the photography of the entire film, supervising all cinematographers and camera operators.
- Production sound mixer: The production sound mixer is the head of the sound department during the production stage of filmmaking. They record and mix the audio on set—dialogue, presence and sound effects in monaural and ambience in stereo. They work with the boom operator, Director, DA, DP, and First AD.
  - Sound designer: The sound designer creates the aural conception of the film, working with the supervising sound editor. On Bollywood-style Indian productions, the sound designer plays the role of a director of audiography (DA).
  - Composer: The composer reads the script, collaborates with director, and then creates new music for the film, called the score. The film's score may be composed before or after the movie finishes filming.

=== Production ===
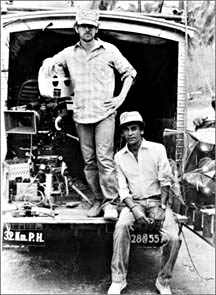
Steven Spielberg (standing) with Chandran Rutnam in Sri Lanka, during the production of Indiana Jones and the Temple of Doom (released 1984)

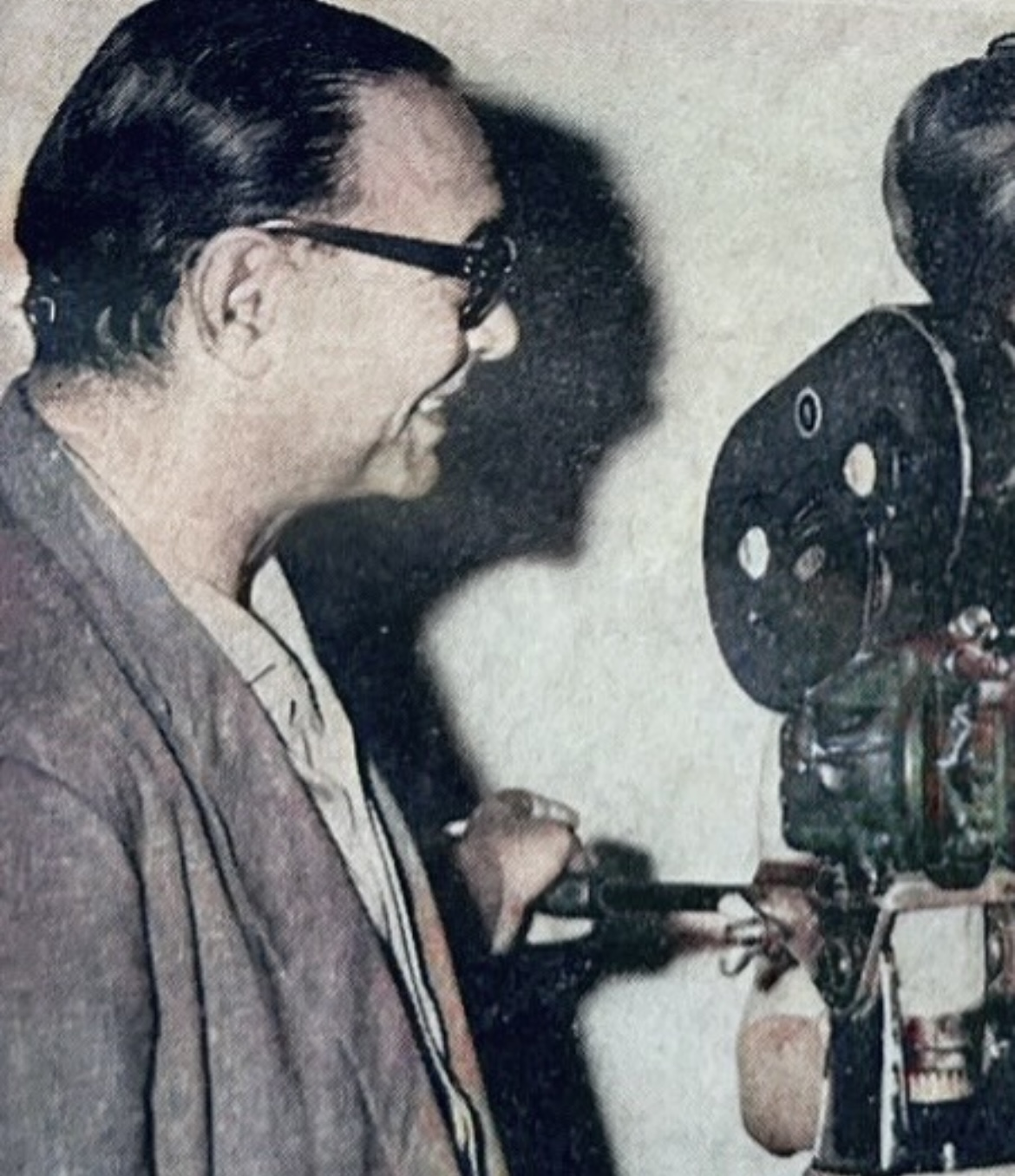
Mahmoud Zulfikar during the production of The Splendor of Love (released 1968)

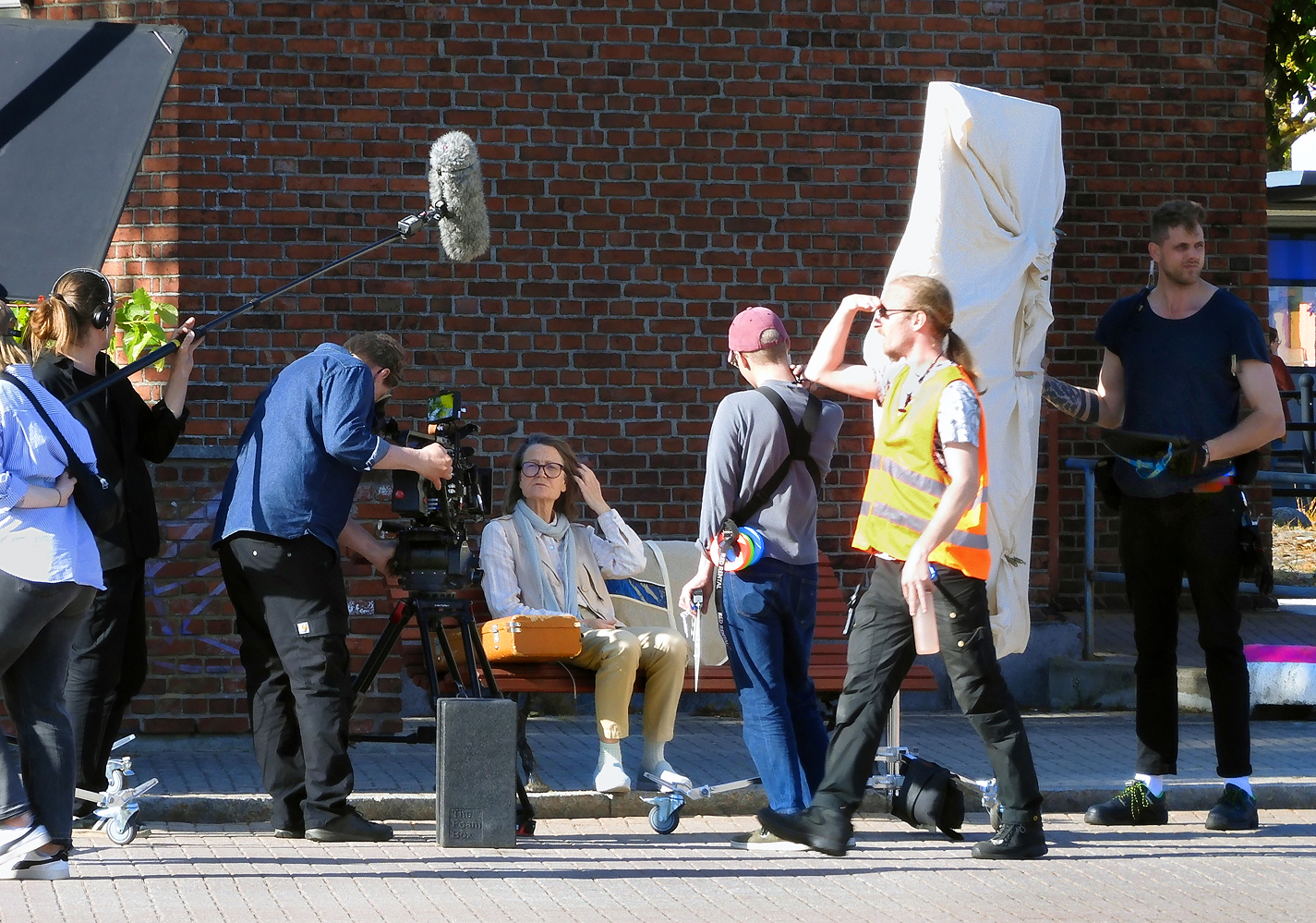
A film production in Ystad 2022

Production can take five to eight weeks for a mid-range movie, or three to four weeks for a lower budget film. During production, the film's audio and video footage is captured. In this phase, it is key to keep planning ahead of the daily shoot. The primary aim is to stick to the budget and schedule, which requires constant vigilance. More crew will be recruited at this stage, such as the property (prop) master, script supervisor, assistant directors, stills photographer, picture editor, and sound editors. These are the most common roles in filmmaking; the production office can create any unique blend of roles to suit the various responsibilities needed during the production of a film. Communication is key between the location, set, office, production company, distributors, and all other parties involved.

A typical day shooting begins with the crew arriving on the set/location by their call time. Actors usually have their own separate call times. Since set construction can take weeks, depending on the size, and set dressing and lighting can take many hours or even days, they are often done in advance.

The grip, electric and production design crews are typically a step ahead of the camera and sound departments. For efficiency's sake, while a scene is being filmed, they are already preparing the next one.

While the crew prepares their equipment, the actors do their costumes and attend the hair and make-up departments. The actors rehearse the script and blocking with the director, and the camera and sound crews rehearse with them and make final tweaks. Finally, the action is shot in as many takes as the director wishes. Most American productions follow a specific procedure:

The assistant director (AD) calls "picture is up!" to inform everyone that a take is about to be recorded, and then "quiet, everyone!" Once everyone is ready to shoot, the AD calls "roll sound" (if the take involves sound), and the production sound mixer will start their equipment, record a verbal slate of the take's information, and announce "sound speed", or just "speed", when they are ready. The AD follows with "roll camera", answered by "speed!" by the camera operator once the camera is recording. The clapper loader, who is already in front of the camera with the clapperboard, calls "marker!" and slaps it shut. If the take involves extras or background action, the AD will cue them ("action background!"), and last is the director, telling the actors "action!". The AD may echo "action" louder on large sets.

A take is over when the director calls "Cut!" and the camera and sound stop recording. The script supervisor will note any continuity issues, and the sound and camera teams log technical notes for the take on their respective report sheets. If the director decides additional takes are required, the whole process repeats. Once satisfied, the crew moves on to the next camera angle or "setup", until the whole scene is "covered." When shooting is finished for the scene, the assistant director declares a "wrap" or "moving on", and the crew will "strike", or dismantle, the set for that scene.

At the end of the day, the director approves the next day's shooting schedule and a daily progress report is sent to the production office. This includes the report sheets from continuity, sound, and camera teams. Call sheets are distributed to the cast and crew to tell them when and where to turn up the next shooting day. Later on, the director, producer, other department heads, and, sometimes, the cast, may gather to watch that day or yesterday's raw, unedited footage, called dailies, and review their work.

With workdays often lasting for 12 to 18 hours, film production tends to create a team spirit. When the entire film is "in the can", or in the completion of the production phase, it is customary for the production office to arrange a wrap party, to thank all the cast and crew for their efforts.

For the production phase on live-action films, synchronizing work schedules of key cast and crew members is very important. For many scenes, several cast members and many crew members must be physically present at the same place at the same time (and bankable stars may need to rush from one project to another). Animated films have different workflow at the production phase, in that voice actors can record their takes in the recording studio at different times and may not see one another until the film's premiere. Animated films also have different crew, since most physical live-action tasks are either unnecessary or are simulated by various types of animators.

=== Post-production ===
Post-production can take days to years, depending on the specific film, as well as the time and resources available. This stage is usually thought of as starting when principal photography ends, but they may overlap. The bulk of post-production consists of the film editor reviewing the footage with the director and assembling the film out of selected takes. The production sound (dialogue) is also edited; music tracks and songs are composed and recorded if a film is intended to have a score; sound effects are designed and recorded. Any computer-generated visual effects are digitally added by an artist. Finally, all sound elements are mixed down into "stems", which are synchronized to the images on the screen. There will be a rough cut, a fine cut, and then a "picture lock", where the editor and director agree on the film’s final cut, which is when it is ready to be distributed and shown to audiences.

Post-production may be completed by a studio's, media company's, or agency's in-house postproduction team, individual freelancers hired for specific roles, or an outsourced postproduction company. Common digital tools used for post-production may include Adobe Premiere, Avid's Media Composer, Final Cut Pro, Adobe After Effects, and Lightworks.

=== Distribution ===
Distribution is the last stage, where the film is released in movie theaters, for direct download or streaming from a digital media provider, direct-to-video physical media (like VHS, VCD, DVD, Blu-ray), or a hybrid of these. The film is duplicated as required (either onto film or hard disk drives) and distributed in cinemas for exhibition (screening).

Marketing is also an essential element of this phase. Press kits, posters, and other advertising materials are published, and the film is advertised and promoted via trailers, social media campaigns, and TV spots. A B-roll clip may be released to the press based on raw footage shot for a "making of" documentary, which may include making-of clips as well as on-set interviews separate from those of the production company or distributor. For major films, key personnel are often contractually required to participate in promotional tours in which they appear at premieres and festivals and sit for interviews with many TV, print, and online journalists. In some cases, a prop from the film may be used to help promote a film—for example, the 40-foot Trojan horse from The Odyssey (2026). Large productions may require more than one promotional tour to rejuvenate audience demand at each release window.

Since the advent of home video in the late 1970s, most major films have followed a pattern of having several distinct release windows. A film may first be released to a few select cinemas, or if it tests well enough, may go directly into wide release. Next, it is released, normally at different times several weeks (or months) apart, into different market segments like rental, retail, pay-per-view, in-flight entertainment, cable television, satellite television, or free-to-air broadcast television. The distribution rights for the film are also usually sold for worldwide distribution. The distributor and the production company share profits and manage losses.

== Independent filmmaking ==
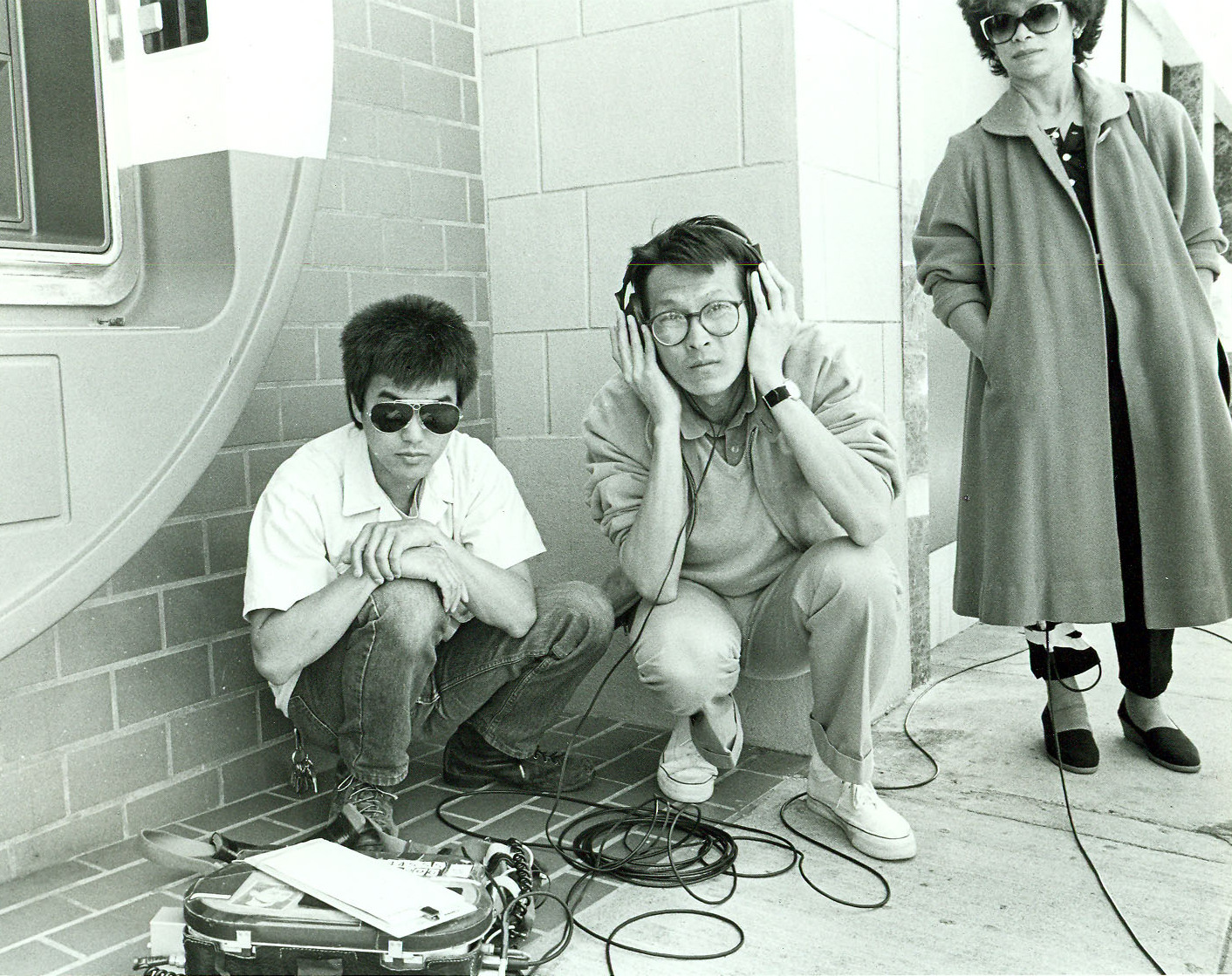
Sound recordist Curtis Choy (left) on location for Dim Sum: A Little Bit of Heart, an indie film by director Wayne Wang (center) on Clement Street in the Richmond District of San Francisco, California 1983

Filmmaking also takes place outside of the mainstream, and this is commonly called independent ("indie") filmmaking. Since the introduction of digital video (DV) technology, the means of production have become more democratized and economically viable. Filmmakers can conceivably shoot and edit a film, create and edit the sound and music, and mix the final cut on a home computer. However, while the means of production may be democratized, financing, traditional distribution, and marketing remain difficult to accomplish outside the traditional system.

In the past, most independent filmmakers relied on film festivals (such as Sundance Film Festival, Venice Film Festival, Cannes Film Festival, and Toronto International Film Festivals) to get their films noticed and sold for distribution and production. However, the internet has allowed for the relatively inexpensive distribution of independent films on websites such as YouTube. As a result, several companies have emerged to assist filmmakers in getting independent movies seen and sold via mainstream internet marketplaces, often adjacent to popular Hollywood titles. With internet movie distribution, independent filmmakers who choose to forego a traditional distribution deal now have the ability to reach global audiences.

== See also ==
- 35 mm film
- 3D film
- Audiography
- Cinematic techniques
- Digital cinema
- Experimental filmmaking
- Film colorization
- Film industry
- Filmmaking technique in Kurosawa
- Filmmaking technique of Luis Buñuel
- Film poster
- Film school
- Film studies
- Film title design
- Film trailer
- First-look deal
- Glossary of motion picture terms
- Housekeeping deal
- List of film topics
- Motion Picture Association
- Motion picture content rating system
- Movie production incentives in the United States
- Movie theater
- Outline of film
- Television
- Video production
