= Production office =

Office responsible for film production

A film production office is the administrative office responsible for managing production of a film.

The production office is responsible to the film producer and includes the production manager, assistant director, and one or more production assistants. It may also include line producers, production office coordinators, secretaries, and runners. A runner is an entry-level position; the runner's role is that of a general assistant to ensure the smooth operation of a production.

Typically a production office is established in the pre-production phase and continues until at least post-production. A production office may look different for each production, depending on many variables, such as the type of film, the production company producing the film, and the size of the budget for the film. A production office can be as small as one or two people or as big as ten or more on a film with a sizeable budget.

== See also ==
- Filmmaking
