= Filmmaking technique of Luis Buñuel =

Luis Buñuel
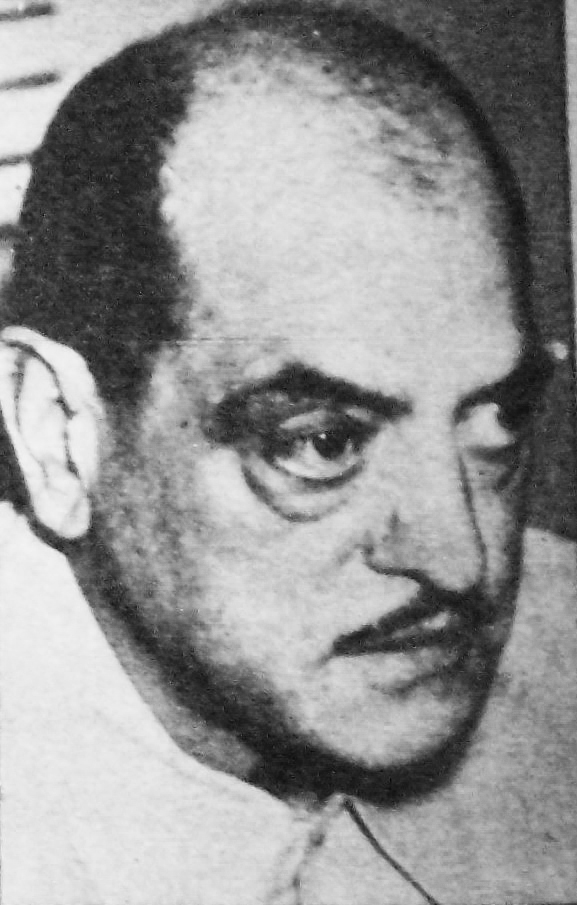
- Buñuel in 1968
- Born: Luis Buñuel Portolés; February 22, 1900; Calanda, Teruel, Spain
- Died: July 29, 1983 (aged 83); Mexico City, Mexico
- Citizenship: Spain (renounced in 1949) Mexico
- Occupation: Filmmaker
- Years active: 1929–1977
- Spouse: Jeanne Rucar (1934–1983; his death)

Luis Buñuel Portolés (Spanish: [ˈlwis βuˈɲwel poɾtoˈles]; 22 February 1900 – 29 July 1983) was a Spanish filmmaker who worked in Spain, Mexico and France. Buñuel is noted for his distinctive use of mise-en scene, distinctive sound editing, and original use of music in his films. Often Buñuel applies the techniques of mise-en-scène to combine multiple single scenes within a film directed by him to represent more encompassing aspects of the film when viewed as a whole.

The staging of scenes in his films was a central motif in Buñuel's filmmaking. Buñuel's films are often sparse in their design and rely on surrealistic elements often without hesitation. The design aspect of Buñuel's filmmaking remained artistically distinctive, essentially combined the creation of "visual themes" with the "telling of a story", almost always in visually striking ways by combining cinematography and set design, and in poetically artful ways through his direction.

Buñuel's filmmaking technique was influenced by many aspects of his personality which included sharp contrasts of character and self-identity. His first picture, Un Chien Andalou—made in the silent era—was called "the most famous short film ever made" by critic Roger Ebert, and his last film, That Obscure Object of Desire—made 48 years later—won him Best Director awards from the National Board of Review and the National Society of Film Critics. Writer Octavio Paz called Buñuel's work "the marriage of the film image to the poetic image, creating a new reality...scandalous and subversive".

Often associated with the surrealist movement of the 1920s, Buñuel created films from the 1920s through the 1970s. His work spans two continents, three languages, and an array of genres, including experimental film, documentary, melodrama, satire, musical, erotica, comedy, romance, costume dramas, fantasy, crime film, adventure, and western. Six of Buñuel's films are included in Sight & Sound's 2012 critics' poll of the top 250 films of all time.

== Style of directing ==
Buñuel's style of directing was extremely economical; he shot films in a few weeks, rarely deviating from his script and shooting in order as much as possible to minimize editing time. He remained true throughout his working life to an operating philosophy that he articulated at the beginning of his career in 1928: "The guiding idea, the silent procession of images that are concrete, decisive, measured in space and time—in a word, the film—was first projected inside the brain of the filmmaker". In this, Buñuel has been compared with Alfred Hitchcock, another director famous for precision, efficiency and preplanning, for whom actually shooting the film was an anticlimax, since each man would know, in Buñuel's words, "exactly how each scene will be shot and what the final montage will be". According to actress Jeanne Moreau: "He was the only director I know who never threw away a shot. He had the film in his mind. When he said 'action' and 'cut,' you knew that what was in between the two would be printed."

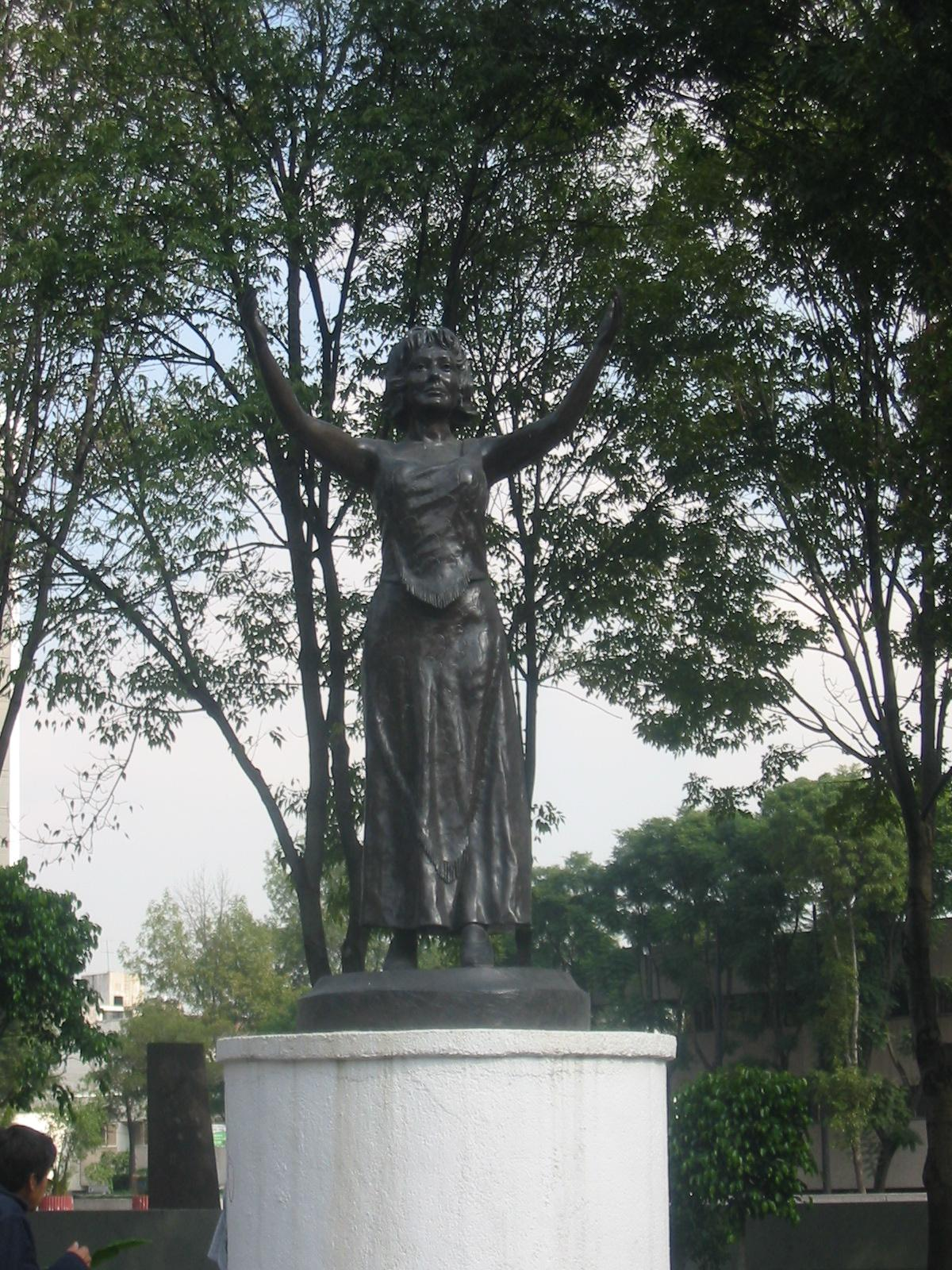
Silvia Pinal was one of Buñuel's "stock company" of actors and was his initial choice for the lead in his film Tristana, a part which finally went to Catherine Deneuve.

As much as possible, Buñuel preferred to work with actors and crew members with whom he had worked before and whom he trusted, leading some critics to refer to these people as a "stock company", including such performers as: Fernando Rey, Francisco Rabal, Pierre Clementi, Julien Bertheau, Michel Piccoli, Claudio Brook, Silvia Pinal, Paul Frankeur and Georges Marchal. In his final film, That Obscure Object of Desire, the central character was played by Rey, but voiced by the French-speaking Piccoli. He told actors as little as possible, and limited his directions mostly to physical movements ("move to the right", "walk down the hall and go through that door", etc.), arguing that he had a better chance of capturing reality with inexperienced players who projected a desired sense of awkwardness. He often refused to answer actors' questions and was known to simply turn off his hearing aid on the set. One of his stars, Catherine Deneuve, has stated: "I've always thought that he likes actors, up to a point. I think he likes very much the idea of the film, and to write it. But I had the impression that the film-making was not what he preferred to do. He had to go through actors, and he liked them if they were easy, simple, not too much fuss." Though they found it difficult at the time, many actors who worked with him acknowledged later that his approach made for fresh and excellent performances.

Buñuel preferred scenes that could simply be pieced together end-to-end in the editing room, resulting in long, mobile, wide shots which followed the action of the scene. Filmmaker Patricia Gruben has attributed this procedure to a long-standing strategy on Buñuel's part intended to thwart external interference: "he would make the whole scene in long four-minute dolly shots so the producers couldn't cut it". Examples are especially present in his French films. For example, at the ski resort's restaurant in Belle de jour, Séverine, Pierre, and Henri converse at a table. Buñuel cuts away from their conversation to two young women, who walk down a few steps and proceed through the restaurant, passing behind Séverine, Pierre, and Henri, at which point the camera stops and the young women walk out of frame. Henri then comments on the women and the conversation at the table progresses from there.

=== Mise-en-scène ===
Critics have remarked on Buñuel's predilection for developing a surrealist mise-en-scène through use of a deceptively sparse naturalism, as Michael Atkinson has put it: "visually Spartan and yet spasming with bouts of the irrational." Buñuel's visual style has been generally characterized as highly functional and uncluttered, with extraneous detail eliminated on sets to focus on character-defining elements.

As an example, Buñuel has told about one of his experiences with cameraman Gabriel Figueroa, a veteran who had become famous in cinematography circles by making a specialty of illuminating the beauty of the Mexican landscape using photographic chiaroscuro (stark contrast between illuminated space and dark shadows). Figueroa had set up a shot for Nazarín near the valley of the Popocatépetl: "It was during this shoot that I scandalized Gabriel Figueroa, who had prepared for me an aesthetically irreproachable framing, with the Popocatépetl in the background and the inevitable white clouds. I simply turned the camera to frame a banal scene that seemed to me more real, more proximate. I have never liked refabricated cinematographic beauty, which very often makes one forget what the film wants to tell, and which personally, does not move me."

Actress Catherine Deneuve has provided another anecdote illustrating this aspect of Buñuel's style: while shooting Tristana, he had told her frequently of the distaste he felt for the "touristy" side of Toledo, where the film was made, so she teased him about one crane shot that brought out the beauty of the surrounding landscape, to which Buñuel responded by re-shooting the entire scene from a dolly with no background whatsoever, all the while inveighing against the "obviously" beautiful.

=== Sound ===
Buñuel has been hailed as a pioneer of the sound film, with L'Age d'Or being cited as one of the first innovative uses of sound in French film. Film scholar Linda Williams has pointed out that Buñuel used sounds, including music, as nonsynchronous counterpoint to the visual image, rather than redundant accompaniment, in accordance with theories that had been advanced by Sergei Eisenstein and others in a 1928 manifesto on the sound film. Critic Marsha Kinder has posited that Buñuel's years as a film dubber in Europe and Hollywood put him in the position of "mastering the conventions of film sound, to subvert them more effectively". In his later years, Buñuel was almost completely deaf, but he continued to assert control over the sound effects in his films, such as The Discreet Charm of the Bourgeoisie, in which seemingly important speech, especially political discourse, is often drowned out by the noise of urban life, in such a systematic manner that Kinder has identified Buñuel as one of the first professional sound designers in cinema. As further illustration of this, scholar Sally Faulkner has described the means by which, in his film Tristana, Buñuel "engineers a kind of figurative deafness, or disability, in the spectator" in scenes which involve deaf characters, by, for example, combining the sound of gushing water with an image of a stagnant pool, or exaggerating the volume level of chiming bells.

=== Music ===
Music is an important part of Buñuel's early films, to such an extent that, for his one silent film Un Chien Andalou, in his sixties, he took the trouble to create a sonorised version. He based this version on the music (Wagner, a South American tango) played at its original screening. Un Chien Andalou was his first film—made in the silent era—and was called "the most famous short film ever made" by critic Roger Ebert. One critic has noted that, in L'Age d'Or, Buñuel employed the music of Beethoven, Mozart, Mendelssohn, Debussy and Wagner "as a kind of connective tissue for, and aural commentary on, the unnerving visuals." As regards Las Hurdes, critics have often remarked on the "nagging inappropriateness" of the score, the fourth movement of Johannes Brahms' Symphony No. 4 in E Minor, a practice called by James Clifford "fortuitous or ironic collage." Although Buñuel's use of this technique declined in frequency over the years, he still occasionally employed incongruous musical juxtaposition for ironic effect, notably during the opening and the climactic scenes of Viridiana, which take place to the strains of Handel's Hallelujah Chorus, in pointed contrast to the jazz music played during the film's final scene of the card game.

Late in life, Buñuel claimed to dislike non-diegetic music (music not intrinsic to the scene itself) and avoided its use, stating: "In my last films I rarely use music. If I do, it has to be justified, so the viewer can see its source: a gramophone or a piano." One consistent exception, however, is the use of the traditional drums from his birthplace Calanda, which are heard in most of his films, with such regularity that the repetition has been described as a "biofilmographic signature". Buñuel's explanation of his use of these drums was the statement: "Nowhere are they beaten with such mysterious power as in Calanda...in recognition of the shadows that covered the earth at the moment Christ died."

The films of his second French era were not scored and some (Belle de jour, Diary of a Chambermaid) are without music entirely. Belle de jour does, however, feature non-diegetic sound effects, "to unify spatially incongruous shots or symbolize [the protagonist's] dream world."

== Influences on Bunuel's filmmaking ==
=== Surrealism ===
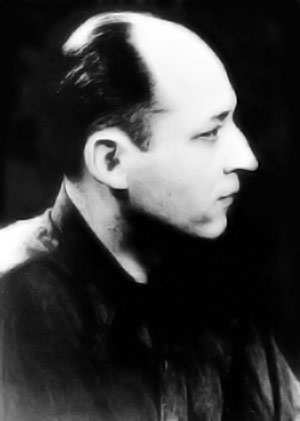
Buñuel considered Benjamin Péret, a long-time friend, the "quintessential surrealist poet."

When his first film was released, Buñuel became the first filmmaker to be officially welcomed into the ranks of the Surrealists by the movement's leader André Breton, an event recalled by film historian Georges Sadoul: "Breton had convoked the creators to our usual venue [the Café Radio]... one summer's evening. Dalí had the large eyes, grace, and timidity of a gazelle. To us, Buñuel, big and athletic, his black eyes protruding a little, seemed exactly like he always is in Un Chien Andalou, meticulously honing the razor that will slice the open eye in two." After he joined the Communist Party in Spain, however, it was quickly made clear to him that he could not be both a Communist and a Surrealist; his artistic collaborator Pierre Unik recounted in a letter of 30 January 1932 that "a comrade from Agit-Prop" called Buñuel and others together to tell them that, "Surrealism was a movement of bourgeois degeneration", continuing, "What will the rank-and-file comrades say the day I have to announce to them, 'Comrades, I no longer have the right to militate amongst you...because I'm a degenerate bourgeois?'" In consequence, on 6 May 1932, Buñuel wrote a letter to André Breton renouncing his membership in the Surrealist group: "Given the current state of things there could be no question for a Communist of doubting for an instant between the choice of his party and any other sort of activity or discipline". He even went so far as to try to re-issue a drastically cut version of L'Age d'Or (over two-thirds of the original were eliminated) in response to complaints that the full 60-minute original was formally too difficult for the proletariat. Nonetheless, he retained a lifelong affinity with the Surrealist movement and longstanding friendships with many of the most prominent Surrealists.

Buñuel's films were famous for their surreal imagery, including scenes in which chickens populate nightmares, women grow beards, and aspiring saints are desired by lascivious women. Even in the many movies he made for hire (rather than for his own creative reasons), such as Susana and The Great Madcap, he usually added his trademark of disturbing and surreal images. Some critics have pointed out that one reason why Buñuel found working in Mexico so congenial was that what might seem unusual or even outlandish in Europe or the United States fit comfortably with elements of Mexican culture and the audience's expectations of national melodrama. As filmmaker Tomás Pérez Turrent has commented, when referring to the apparently incredible features that many critics find in Buñuel's films: "In Mexico, it's believable", while one of the founders of Surrealism, André Breton, called Mexico, "the most surrealist country in the world."

Certainly, running through the more personal films of Buñuel's early and late years is a backbone of surrealism. Two or three examples suffice to demonstrate the point of the endemic quality of Buñuel's use of surrealism. One example of surrealism in Buñuel's world is one found when an entire dinner party suddenly finds itself inexplicably unable to leave the room and go home. In another example of Buñuel's applied use of surrealism, a bad dream hands a man a letter which he brings to the doctor the next day; and in another where the devil, if unable to tempt a saint with a pretty girl, will fly him to a disco. An example of a more Dada influence can be found in Cet obscur objet du désir, when Mathieu closes his eyes and has his valet spin him around and direct him to a map on the wall. This was his last film, where the title was translated as That Obscure Object of Desire—made 48 years after his first silent film—which won him Best Director awards from the National Board of Review and the National Society of Film Critics.

Buñuel never explained or promoted his work, remaining true to his and Dalí's early insistence on the completely irrational and defying symbolic interpretation. On one occasion, when his son was interviewed about The Exterminating Angel, Buñuel instructed him to give facetious answers. As examples, when asked about the presence of a bear in the socialites' house, Buñuel fils claimed it was because his father liked bears, and, similarly, the several repeated scenes in the film were explained as having been put there to increase the running time.

=== Entomology ===
As a university student, Buñuel had studied entomology at the Museum of Natural History under the famous naturalist Ignacio Bolívar, and he had an early and lasting interest in the scientific documentaries of Jean Painlevé, which he tried to screen at the Residencia de Estudiantes. Numerous critics have commented on the number of sequences in his films involving insects, from the death's head moth in Un chien andalou and the extended scorpion scenes in L'Age d'or to the framed tarantula in Le Fantôme de la liberté. Others have commented on the dispassionate nature of Buñuel's treatment of his characters, likening it to the stance of the entomological researcher, and Buñuel himself once said that he had an "entomological" interest in the protagonist of his film El. The writer Henry Miller observed: "Buñuel, like an entomologist, has studied what we call love in order to expose beneath the ideology, mythology, platitudes and phraseologies the complete and bloody machinery of sex." The writer Octavio Paz also called Buñuel's work "the marriage of the film image to the poetic image, creating a new reality … scandalous and subversive".

=== Religion and atheism ===
Buñuel's filmmaking technique was influenced by many aspects of his personality, which included his skepticism of religion, as evidenced in The New York Times which called him "an iconoclast, moralist, and revolutionary who was a leader of avant-garde surrealism in his youth and a dominant international movie director half a century later". Many of his films were openly critical of bourgeois morals and organized religion, mocking the Roman Catholic Church in particular but religion in general, for its hypocrisy. When asked if it was intention to blaspheme in his films, Buñuel responded, "I didn't deliberately set out to be blasphemous, but then Pope John XXIII is a better judge of such things than I am." Many of his most famous films demonstrate this irreverent spirit:

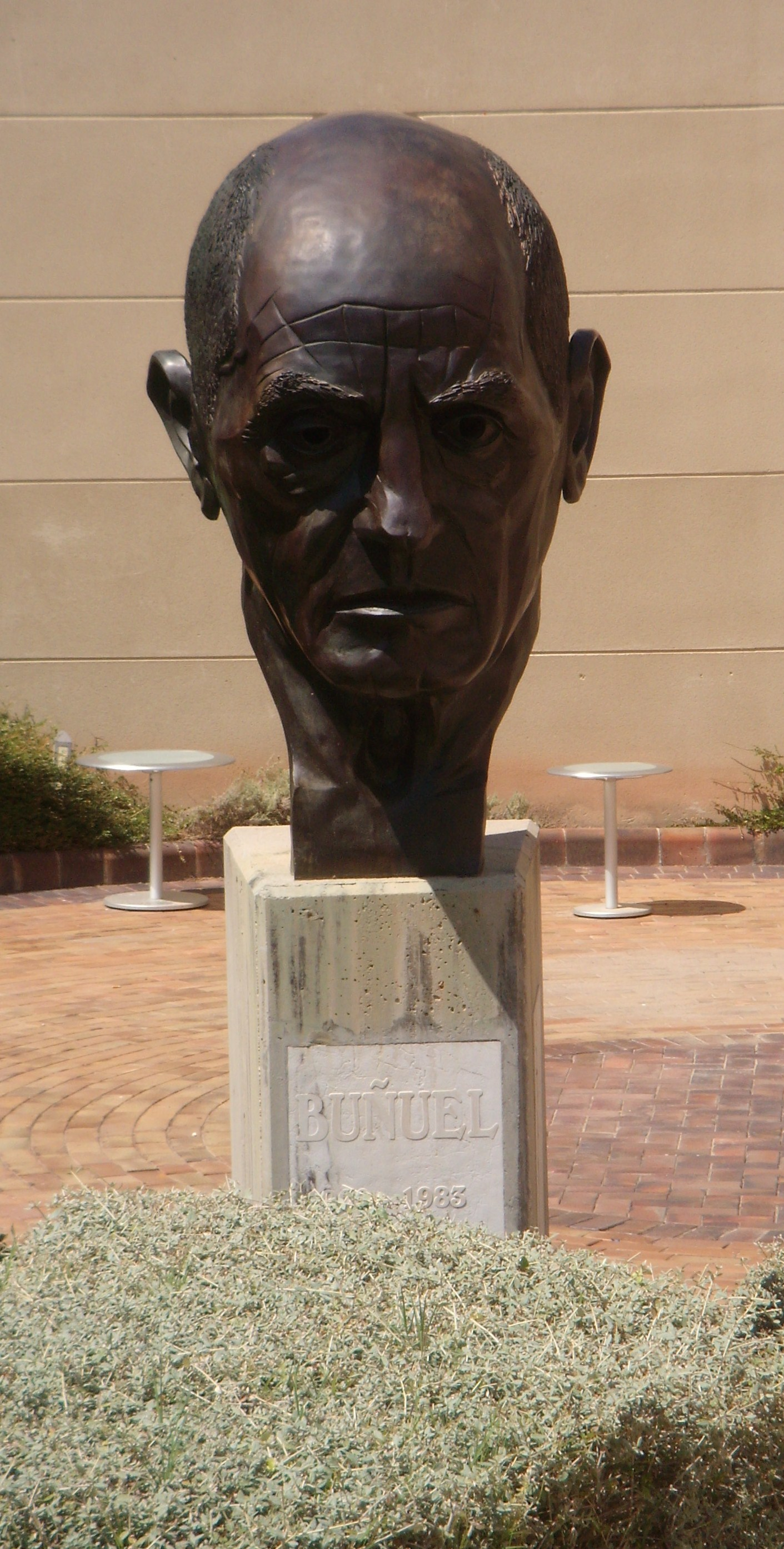
Head of Luis Buñuel in Centro Buñuel Calanda

- Un chien andalou (1929) – A man drags pianos, upon which are piled two dead donkeys, two priests, and the tablets of The Ten Commandments.
- L'Âge d'Or (1930) – A bishop is thrown out a window, and in the final scene one of the culprits of the 120 days of Sodom is portrayed by an actor dressed in a way that he would be recognized as Jesus.
- El Gran Calavera (1949) – During the final scenes of the wedding, the priest continuously reminds the bride of her obligations under marriage. Then the movie changes and the bride runs chasing her true love.
- Ensayo de un crimen (1955) – A man dreams of murdering his wife while she's praying in bed dressed all in white.
- Nazarin (1959) – The pious lead character wreaks ruin through his attempts at charity.
- Viridiana (1961) – A well-meaning young nun tries unsuccessfully to help the poor. One scene in the film parodies The Last Supper.
- El ángel exterminador (1962) – The final scene is of sheep entering a church, mirroring the entrance of the parishioners.
- Simón del desierto (1965) – The devil tempts a saint by taking the form of a bare-breasted girl singing and showing off her legs. At the end of the film, the saint abandons his ascetic life to hang out in a jazz club.
- La Voie Lactée (1969) – Two men travel the ancient pilgrimage road to Santiago de Compostela and meet embodiments of various heresies along the way. One dreams of anarchists shooting the Pope.

Buñuel is often cited as one of the world's most prominent atheists. In a 1960 interview, he was asked about his attitude toward religion, and his response has become one of his most celebrated quotes: "I'm still an atheist, thank God." But his entire answer to the question was somewhat more nuanced: "I have no attitude. I was raised in it. I could answer "I'm still an atheist, thank God." I believe we must seek God within man himself. This is a very simple attitude." Critics have pointed out that Buñuel's atheism was closely connected to his surrealism, in that he considered chance and mystery, and not providence, to be at the heart of all reality. Orson Welles, an admirer of Buñuel, claimed: “He is a deeply Christian man who hates God as only a Christian can, and, of course, he’s very Spanish.” Juan Luis Buñuel worked on Welles's unfinished adaptation of Don Quixote.

Seventeen years later, in an interview with the New Yorker, Buñuel expressed a somewhat different opinion about religion and atheism: "I'm not a Christian, but I'm not an atheist either, ... I'm weary of hearing that accidental old aphorism of mine, 'I'm not an atheist, thank God.' It's outworn. Dead leaves. In 1951, I made a small film called 'Mexican Bus Ride', about a village too poor to support a church and a priest. The place was serene, because no one suffered from guilt. It's guilt we must escape, not God." However, in 1982, Buñuel had reaffirmed his atheism in his autobiography. Mexican novelist Carlos Fuentes has commented that Buñuel represents one of the most compelling intellectual tendencies of the twentieth century: "religious temperament without religious faith."

== Legacy of filmmaking ==
Six of Buñuel's films are included in Sight & Sound's 2012 critics' poll of the top 250 films of all time. Fifteen of his films are included in the They Shoot Pictures, Don't They? list of the 1,000 greatest films of all time, which is tied with John Ford for second most, and he ranks number 13 on their list of the top 250 directors.

== See also ==
- Art film
- Cinema of Mexico
- Cinema of Spain
- Generation of '27
- List of atheists in film, radio, television and theater
- List of banned films
- Atheism and religion
- Surrealist cinema

== Documentaries ==
- Dans l'oeil de Luis Buñuel. France, 2013, 54 min., book and director: François Lévy-Kuentz, Producer: KUIV Productions, arte France.
- El último guión – Buñuel en la memoria. Spain, Germany, France, 2008, 45 min., Book and director: Javier Espada und Gaizka Urresti, Producer: Imval Producciones
