= Surrealist cinema =

Film genre

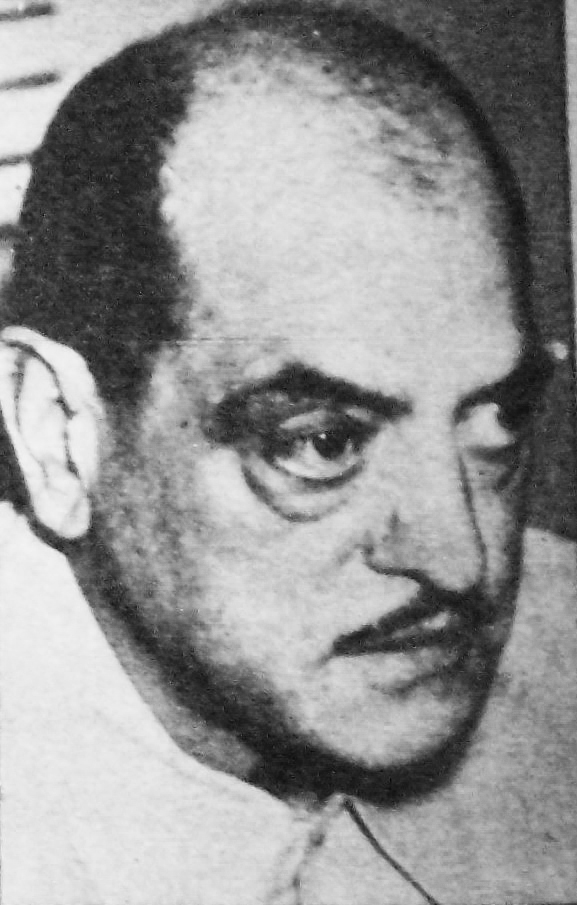
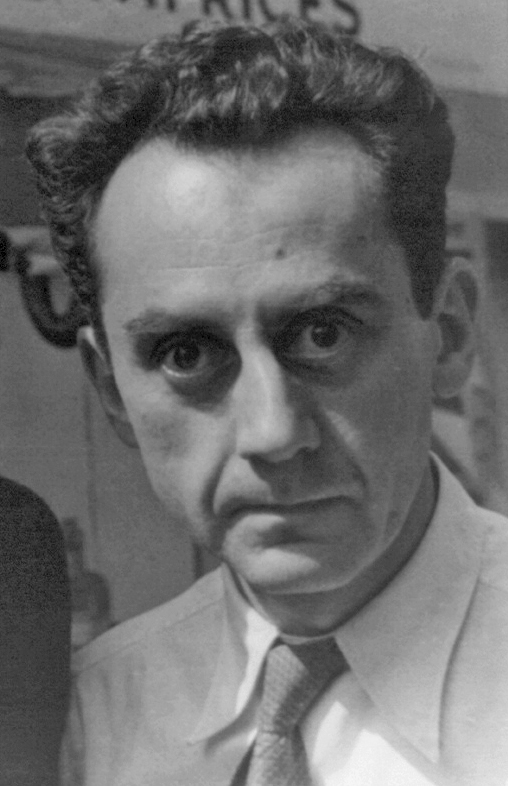
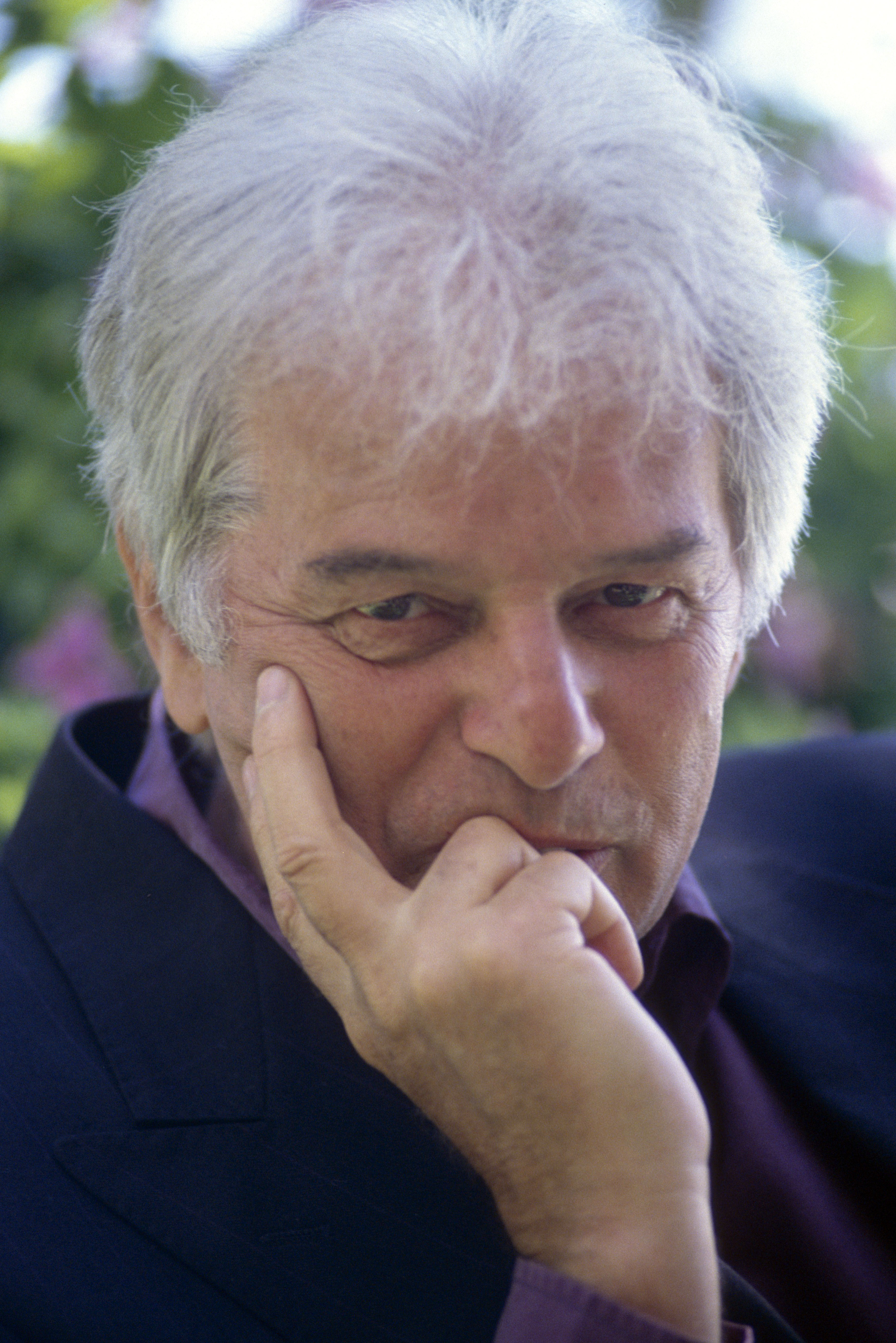
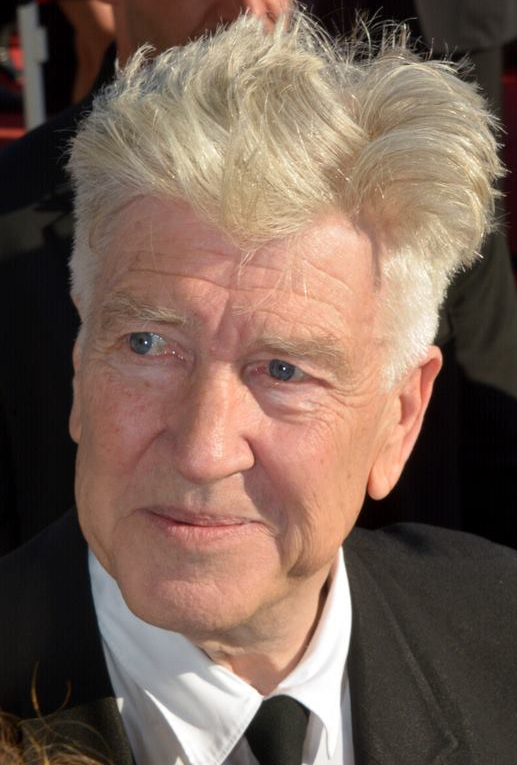
Notable surrealist filmmakers include (clockwise from top) Luis Buñuel, Man Ray, David Lynch, and Alejandro Jodorowsky.

Surrealist cinema is a modernist approach to filmmaking, theory, and criticism that first arose in Paris during the 1920s. Works in this category transfer the techniques of the art world's surrealism movement to film; shocking, irrational, or absurd imagery is combined with dreamlike Freudian symbolism to challenge the traditional view that the function of art is to represent reality. It is related to Dadaism and is similarly characterized by juxtapositions, the rejection of dramatic psychology, and frequent use of shocking imagery. Philippe Soupault and André Breton's book Les Champs magnétiques (1920) is often regarded as the first Surrealist work of fiction, but Surrealism is not considered to have been truly born until the publication of Breton's Surrealist Manifesto (1924), in which he wrote that Surrealism is "psychic automatism in its pure state, by which one proposes to express—verbally, by means of the written word, or in any other manner—the actual functioning of thought [...] dictated by thought, in the absence of any control exercised by reason, exempt from any aesthetic or moral concern".

Surrealist cinema boomed in the 1920s, with notable films including Entr'acte, Ballet Mécanique, The Whirlpool of Fate, Anemic Cinema, both the French and American adaptations of The Fall of the House of Usher, and The Seashell and the Clergyman, in addition to Un Chien Andalou and L'Âge d'Or, both of which were directed by Luis Buñuel, who co-wrote both screenplays with Salvador Dalí.

It rose to prominence as mainstream and art cinema starting in the 1970s, most notably David Lynch, known for his films including Eraserhead, Lost Highway, Mulholland Drive, and Inland Empire, as well as his television series Twin Peaks.

== Theory ==
Surrealism draws upon irrational imagery and the subconscious mind. Surrealists are sometimes mistaken as whimsical or incapable of logical thought.

Michael Richardson defined Surrealism in his book Surrealism and Cinema (2006) as "a shifting point of magnetism around which the collective activity of the surrealists revolves" instead of a fixed aesthetic, and argued that Surrealist works cannot be defined by style or form, but rather as results of the practice of Surrealism itself. He wrote:

Within popular conceptions, surrealism is misunderstood in many different ways, some of which contradict others, but all of these misunderstandings are founded in the fact that they seek to reduce surrealism to a style or a thing in itself rather than being prepared to see it as an activity with broadening horizons. Many critics fail to recognize the distinctive qualities that make up the surrealist attitude. They seek something—a theme, a particular type of imagery, certain concepts—they can identify as "surrealist" in order to provide a criterion of judgement by which a film or artwork can be appraised. The problem is that this goes against the very essence of surrealism, which refuses to be here but is always elsewhere. It is not a thing but a relation between things and therefore needs to be treated as a whole. Surrealists are not concerned with conjuring up some magic world that can be defined as "surreal". Their interest is almost exclusively in exploring the conjunctions, the points of contact, between different realms of existence. Surrealism is always about departures rather than arrivals.

== History ==
Surrealism was the first literary and artistic movement to become seriously associated with cinema, though it has also been largely neglected by film critics and historians. Short-lived as its initial popularity was, it became known for its dreamlike quality; juxtaposition of everyday people and objects in irrational forms; and the abstraction of real life, places, and things. Highly influenced by Freudian psychology, Surrealism sought to bring the unconscious mind to visual life, described by Gina Marie Ezzone as "balanced between symbolism and realism, Surrealist cinema commentated on themes of life, death, modernity, politics, religion, and art itself".

The foundations of the movement began in Paris and coincided with the birth of motion pictures. France served as the birthplace of surrealist cinema due to a fortunate combination of easy access to film equipment, film financing, and a plethora of interested artists and audiences. The Surrealists who participated in the movement were among the first generation to have grown up with film as a part of daily life.

Breton himself, even before the launching of the movement, possessed an avid interest in film; while stationed in Nantes during the First World War, he and his superior Jacques Vaché would frequent the movie houses together in their spare time. According to Breton, they ignored film titles and lengths, preferring to drop in at any given moment and view the films without any foreknowledge. When they grew bored, they left and visited the next theater. Breton's movie-going habits supplied him with a stream of images with no constructed order. He could juxtapose the images of one film with those of another, and craft his own interpretation from this experience.

Breton once remarked of his experiences with Vaché, "I think what we [valued] most in it, to the point of taking no interest in anything else, was its power to disorient." He believed that film could help a person abstract themselves from "real life" whenever they felt like it. Serials, which often contained cliffhanger effects and hints of "other worldliness", were attractive to early Surrealists. Examples include Houdini's daredevil deeds and the escapades of Musidora and Pearl White in detective stories. What endeared Surrealists most to the genre was its ability to evoke and sustain a sense of mystery and suspense in viewers. The Surrealists saw in film a medium which nullified reality's boundaries. Film critic René Gardies wrote in 1968, "Now the cinema is, quite naturally, the privileged instrument for derealising the world. Its technical resources, allied with its photo-magic, provide the alchemical tools for transforming reality."

Surrealist artists were interested in cinema as a medium for expression. As cinema continued to develop in the 1920s, many Surrealists saw in it an opportunity to portray the ridiculous as rational. Surrealists realized that the film camera could capture the real world in a dreamlike way that pens and paintbrushes could not: superimpositions, overexposure, fast motion, slow motion, reverse motion, stop motion, lens flares, widely varying depths of field, and more bizarre camera tricks could transform the original image in front of the lens into something new once exposed on the film plate.

For surrealists, film gave them the ability to challenge and mold the boundaries between fantasy and reality, especially in regard to space and time. Like the dreams they wished to bring to life, film had no limits or rules. Cinema provided more convincing illusions than its closest rival, theatre, and the tendency for Surrealists to express themselves through film was a sign of their confidence in the adaptability of cinema to Surrealism's goals and requirements. They were the first to seriously consider the resemblance between film's imaginary images and those of dreams and the unconscious. Luis Buñuel, whose filmmaking technique has been widely studied, said that "the film seems to be the involuntary imitation of the dream".

Surrealist filmmakers sought to redefine human awareness of reality by illustrating that the "real" was little more than what was perceived as real, and that reality was only constrained by the limits people imposed upon it. Breton once compared the experience of Surrealist literature to "the point at which the waking state joins sleep". His analogy helps to explain the advantage of cinema over books in facilitating the kind of release Surrealists sought from their daily pressures. The modernity of film was also appealing to Surrealists.

Critics have debated whether surrealist cinema is a distinct genre; as recognition of a genre involves the ability to cite many works that share thematic, formal, and stylistic traits, referring to Surrealism as a genre implies that there is repetition of elements and a recognizable, generic formula which describes them. Several critics have thus argued that Surrealism's use of non sequiturs and the irrational make it impossible for it to constitute a genre.

While there are numerous films which are true expressions of the movement, many other films which have been classified as Surrealist simply contain Surrealist fragments. Rather than "Surrealist film", the more accurate term for such works may be "Surrealism in film".

== Surrealist films and filmmakers ==
=== Early works ===
The Seashell and the Clergyman (1928), directed by Germaine Dulac

- Entr'acte: a 22-minute silent French film, written by René Clair and Francis Picabia, and directed by Clair, released December 4, 1924.
- The Seashell and the Clergyman: a 31-minute silent film, written by Antonin Artaud, and directed by Germaine Dulac, released in February 1928.
- L'Étoile de mer: a 15-minute silent French film, written and directed by Man Ray, released in 1928.
- Un Chien Andalou: a 21-minute silent French film, written by Salvador Dalí and Luis Buñuel, and directed by Buñuel, released in 1929.
- Les Mystères du Château du Dé: a 27-minute silent French film, written and directed by Man Ray, released in 1929.
- L'Age d'Or: a 60-minute French film with sound, written by Dalí and Buñuel, and directed by Buñuel, released in 1930.

=== Later works ===
Meshes of the Afternoon (1943), directed by Maya Deren and Alexander Hammid

Joseph Cornell produced surrealist films in the United States in the late 1930s, such as Rose Hobart (1936). Antonin Artaud, Philippe Soupault, and Robert Desnos wrote screenplays for later surrealist films.

Salvador Dalí designed a dream sequence for Alfred Hitchcock's film Spellbound (1945), which was one of the first Hollywood films to use psychoanalysis as a major element of the story. Hitchcock wanted to capture the vividness of dreams as never before and felt that Dalí was the person to help him do so, giving Dalí free rein to bring to the screen an innovative vision of the way dreams could be represented.

Maya Deren made numerous silent short films, among them the renowned Meshes of the Afternoon, replete with surreal, dreamlike scenes and encounters. Jan Švankmajer was a member of the Czech Surrealist Group. In 1946, Dalí and Walt Disney began work on a film called Destino, which was finally finished in 2003.

Many of David Lynch's films, such as Eraserhead (1977), Lost Highway (1997), Mulholland Drive (2001), and Inland Empire (2006), as well as his television series Twin Peaks (1990–1991; 2017), are widely considered surrealist. Another prominent example is Charlie Kaufman with films including Being John Malkovich (1999), Eternal Sunshine of the Spotless Mind (2004), Synecdoche, New York (2008), Anomalisa (2015), and I'm Thinking of Ending Things (2020). Due to their influence and impact on popular culture, the careers of Lynch and Kaufman could be seen as the closest that surrealist cinema has come to achieving widespread mainstream recognition.

Other directors whose films have been considered surrealist include Fernando Arrabal, Alejandro Jodorowsky, Stephen Sayadian, and Brian Patrick Butler.

== See also ==
- Experimental film
- Filmmaking technique of Luis Buñuel
- Oneiric (film theory)
- Non-narrative film
- Theatre of Cruelty
