= Mise-en-scène =

Visual and design aspects of a theatre production

Mise-en-scène (French pronunciation: [miz ɑ̃ sɛn]; English: "placing on stage" or "what is put into the scene") is the stage design and arrangement of actors in scenes for a theatre or film production, both in the visual arts through storyboarding, visual themes, and cinematography and in narrative-storytelling through directions. The term is also commonly used to refer to single scenes that are representative of a film.

Mise-en-scène has been called film criticism's "grand undefined term". Ed Sikov has attempted to define it as "the totality of expressive content within the image". It has been criticized for its focus on the dramatic design aspects rather than the plot itself, as those who utilize mise-en-scène tend to look at what is "put before the camera" rather than the story. The use of mise-en-scène is significant as it allows the director to convey messages to the viewer through what is placed in the scene, not just the scripted lines spoken and acted in the scene. Mise-en-scène allows the director to not only convey their message but also implement their aesthetic; as such, each director has their own unique mise-en-scène. Mise-en-scène refers to everything in front of the camera, including the set design, lighting, and actors, and the ultimate way that this influences how the scene comes together for the audience.

== Definition in film studies ==
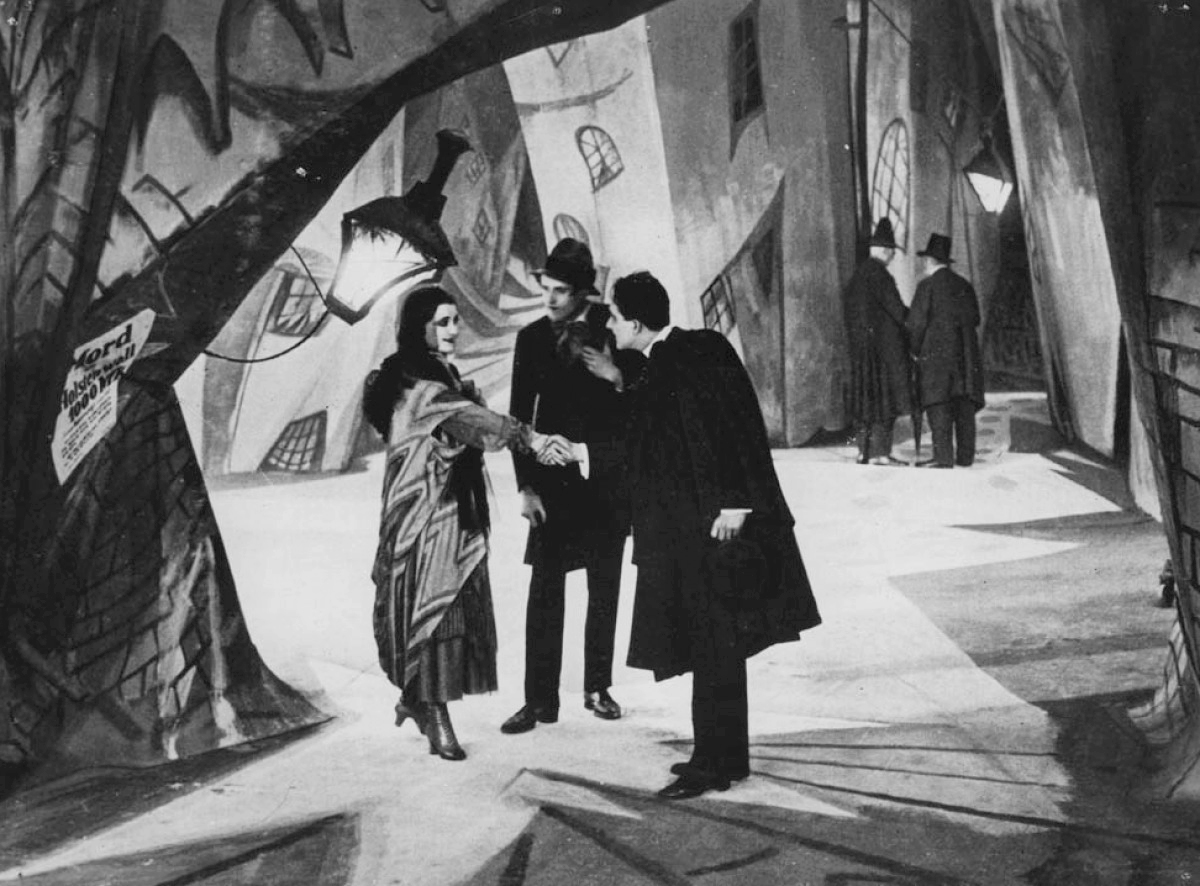
The distinctive mise-en-scène of The Cabinet of Dr. Caligari (Germany, 1920) features jagged architecture.

When applied to the cinema, mise-en-scène refers to everything that appears before the camera—the sets, props, costumes, actors, and even the lighting. These elements help to express a film's vision by generating a sense of time and space, as well as setting a mood. Mise-en-scène can be used to suggest a character's state of mind, whether that be happy with bright colors, or sad with darker colors.

Mise-en-scène also includes the composition, which consists of the positioning and movement of actors, as well as objects, in the shot, as overseen by the director and production designer. The director (who controls props, costumes, lighting and sound) all have input on the mise-en-scène; they work together to make sure it fits the film well before production begins. The production designer is generally responsible for the look of the movie, and thus leads the various departments in charge of individual sets, locations, props, and costumes, among other things. André Bazin, a French film critic and film theorist, describes the mise-en-scène aesthetic as emphasizing choreographed movement within the scene rather than through editing.

According to Sikov, mise-en-scène includes every detail and treats every detail as "a statement of meaning" regardless of whether the director consciously intended that or not. When an actor appears on the screen in a costume on a set with specific props, the director made creative choices to place all those particular things in the shot—because after all, it is their movie—and those choices convey meaningful information to the viewer as to what a film is about. Mise-en-scène includes not only what is present but what is absent, such as the director's intentional use of a "big empty wall" where one would expect to see decorations on a wall.

Mise-en-scène, as a term, is also sometimes used by screenwriters to refer to the descriptive paragraphs between the dialog used in shot blocking.

== Key aspects ==
=== Set design ===
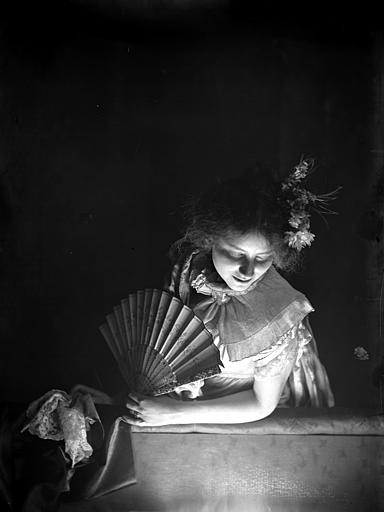
Mise en scène by Constant Puyo

An important element of mise-en-scène is set design—the setting of a scene and the objects (props) visible in a scene. Set design can be used to amplify character emotion or to set the mood, which effects the physical, social, psychological, emotional, economic, and cultural significance in the film. Set design often influences many themes or parts of a film.

Mise-en-scène can also affect the decision whether to shoot on location or set. Shooting on a set is more commonly done than shooting on location for reasons of cost efficiency and simplicity; on a set, the filmmakers can create the entire background and arrange the props within it. On the other hand, if shooting on location the natural background must be considered—if there is a boulder, barn, or field in the background it must either be worked around or integrated.

=== Lighting ===
The intensity, direction, and quality of lighting can influence an audience's understanding of characters, actions, themes, and mood. Light (and shade) can emphasize texture, shape, distance, mood, time of day, season, and glamour; it affects the way colors are rendered, both in terms of hue and depth, and can focus attention on particular elements of the composition. Highlights, for example, call attention to shapes and textures, while shadows often conceal things, creating a sense of mystery or fear. For this reason, lighting must be thoroughly planned to ensure its desired effect on an audience. Cinematographers are a large part of this process, as they coordinate the camera and lighting crews. Lighting is the last factor of mise-en-scène that ties together texture, setting, and characters; it directs each scene, directing the viewers' gaze and attention.

=== Space ===
The use of space also affects the mise-en-scène of a film. The depth, proximity, size, and proportions of places and objects can be manipulated through lighting, set design, and camera placement and lenses—effectively determining the mood and relationships between elements. Space is the most overlooked component of mise-en-scène, yet the use of space determines whether the screen is too compact or too empty for the themes, characters' emotions, or major events. For example, an empty space may represent peace and an empty mind.

=== Composition ===
Composition is the organization of objects, actors and space within the frame, often by use of balance and symmetry for the distribution of light, color, objects and figures in a shot. Composition also includes the intentional use of misalignment, often to emphasize certain portions of the screen and distract the viewers from the background. This works because audiences are more inclined to pay attention to something off balance, out of place, or abnormal. Through these mise-en-scène, directors carefully compose the frame to control the narrative and induce viewers to pay attention to certain characters or points of interest in a scene.

A simple question that captures the thought process of composition is: How do some of the items included within the frame of the photograph/still-frame add to the image’s narrative or visual effect? This question empowers the reader of the image to count and group similar items in an organisable manner and to derive meaning from sets of objects, subjects or animals in the frame.

The usual answer technique resembles this exemplary multistep method: Some of the items in the frame are “sports equipment” which symbolise “team-work” and give the viewer an impression of the film's overall theme of “trust”. This answer technique can be applied to different items in other frames, such as: Some of the items in the second frame are "expensive furniture and rugs" symbolising "the accumulation of wealth" and give the viewer an impression of the film's theme of "professional rewards".

Lastly, composition (or arrangement of items in a frame) can give effect to various feelings, such as: Jovial family times (a well-set dining table with many different plates of food), or "Drowning" in bills (an actor, face in palms, surrounded by many separate bills and tax invoices).

=== Costume ===
Costume design refers to all the clothes that characters wear. By using particular colors or designs, narrative cinema uses costumes to make clear distinctions between characters or to signify a particular character. While costume design is a subtle component of mise-en-scène, it is an important one, with an Oscar awarded annually for the best costume design. Designers often use specific colors to enhance emotions, whether that be red to draw attention or using light versus dark colors. Often, costume designs are used to attract the attention of the audience, communicate details of a character's personality to the audience, and help actors transform into believable characters.

=== Makeup and hairstyles ===
While makeup and hairstyles can be included in costumes and design, they are often viewed separately as they can take hours to apply daily. Actors may wake up hours before shooting begins to get makeup applied, sometimes including prosthetics or even full-body makeup. Makeup and hairstyles establish periods, reveal character traits, and signal changes within a character.

=== Acting ===
There is enormous historical and cultural variation in performance styles in the cinema. In the early years of cinema, stage acting was difficult to differentiate from film acting, as most film actors had previously been stage actors and therefore knew no other method of acting. Eventually, the melodramatic styles of 19th-century theatre gave way, in Western cinema, to a relatively naturalistic style. This more naturalistic style of acting is largely influenced by Konstantin Stanislavski's theory of method acting, which involves the actor fully immersing themselves in their character. The art of acting uses movement, gesture, and intonation to realize a character for the stage, motion picture, or television. The acting, setting, themes, and other factors must align to fit the mise-en-scène.

=== Film ===
The film medium itself affects the mise-en-scène. The film stock may be black-and-white or color, fine-grain or grainy. Likewise, different aspect ratios yield different ways of looking at the world and the expressive meaning of the film.

=== Actor blocking ===
The terms 'blocking' and 'blocks' were both used as early as 1961. In theatre, blocking is the precise staging of actors to facilitate the performance of a play, ballet, film or opera; it is a set of instructions incorporated by the director to ensure the appropriate mise-en-scène of the film. In contemporary theatre, the director usually determines blocking during the rehearsal, telling actors where they should stand for the proper dramatic effect, ensure sight lines for the audience and work with the lighting design of the scene.

== See also ==
- Choreography
- Montage
- Filmmaking technique of Luis Buñuel
