= Atheism and religion =

Some movements or sects within traditionally monotheistic or polytheistic religions recognize that it is possible to practice religious faith, spirituality and adherence to tenets without a belief in deities. People with what would be considered religious or spiritual belief in a supernatural controlling power are defined by some as adherents to a religion; the argument that atheism is a religion has been described as a contradiction in terms.

== Abrahamic religions ==
=== Judaism ===
Jewish atheism usually refers to the atheism of people who are ethnically and (at least to some extent) culturally Jewish. Contrary to popular belief, the term "Jewish atheism" is not a contradiction because Jewish identity encompasses not only religious components, but also ethnic and cultural ones. Not all ethnic Jews practice or believe in religious Judaism.

In general, formulations of Jewish principles of faith require a belief in God (represented by Judaism's paramount prayer, the Shema). In many modern Jewish religious movements, rabbis have generally considered the behavior of a Jew to be the determining factor in whether or not one is considered an adherent of Judaism. Within these movements it is often recognized that it is possible for a Jew to strictly practice Judaism as a faith, while at the same time being an agnostic or atheist. Reconstructionist Judaism does not require any belief in a deity, and certain popular Reform prayer books, such as Gates of Prayer, offer some services without mention of God. Jewish atheists who practice Humanistic Judaism embrace Jewish culture and history, rather than belief in a supernatural god, as the sources of their Jewish identity. A 2003 online poll in the United States found that only 48% of self-identified Jews believe in God.

Nineteenth-century and early twentieth-century Reform Judaism in the US, which had become the dominant form of Judaism there by the 1880s, was profoundly shaped by its engagement with high profile sceptics and atheists such as Robert Ingersoll and Felix Adler. These included the writings of rabbis such as Isaac Mayer Wise, Kaufmann Kohler, Emil G. Hirsch, Joseph Krauskopf, Aaron Hahn, and J. Leonard Levy, with the result that a distinctly panentheistic character of US Reform Jewish theology was observable, which many would have viewed as atheistic or espousing atheistic tendencies.

Rabbi Abraham Isaac Kook, first Chief Rabbi of the Jewish community in Palestine, held that atheists were not actually denying God: rather, they were denying one of man's many images of God. Since any man-made image of God can be considered an idol, Kook held that, in practice, one could consider atheists as helping true religion burn away false images of God, thus in the end serving the purpose of true monotheism.

=== Christianity ===
High rates of atheism have been found among self-identified Christians in the United States. Out of all Americans who do not believe in God, 5% identified as Catholic while 9% identified as Protestant and other Christian according to the 2007 Pew Religious Landscape survey. Out of all Americans who identify as unaffiliated including atheists and agnostics, 41% were raised Protestant and 28% were raised Catholic according to the 2014 Pew Religious Landscape survey.

There is no single Christian approach toward atheism. The approach taken varies between Christian denominations, and Christian ministers may intelligently distinguish an individual's claims of atheism from other nominal states of personal perspective, such as plain disbelief, an adherence to science, a misunderstanding of the nature of religious belief, or a disdain for organized religion in general.

The Catechism of the Catholic Church makes this explicit. While it identifies atheism as a violation of the First Commandment, calling it "a sin against the virtue of religion", it is careful to acknowledge that atheism may be motivated by virtuous or moral considerations, and admonishes the followers of Roman Catholicism to focus on their own role in encouraging atheism by their religious or moral shortcomings:

(2125) [...] The imputability of this offense can be significantly diminished in virtue of the intentions and the circumstances. "Believers can have more than a little to do with the rise of atheism. To the extent that they are careless about their instruction in the faith, or present its teaching falsely, or even fail in their religious, moral, or social life, they must be said to conceal rather than to reveal the true nature of God and of religion."

In May 2013, Pope Francis said that atheists may be able to enter Heaven, because the redemptive embrace of Jesus applies to everyone who does good, regardless of their beliefs. The Catechism of the Catholic Church also says Heaven is available to everyone, if they are not Christian and "through no fault of their own, do not know Christ and the Church."

A famous idiosyncratic atheist belief is that of Thomas J. J. Altizer. His book The Gospel of Christian Atheism (1967) proclaims the highly unusual view that God has literally died, or self-annihilated. According to Altizer, this is nevertheless "a Christian confession of faith". Making clear the difference between his position and that of both Nietzsche's notion of the death of God and the stance of theological non-realists, Altizer says, "To confess the death of God is to speak of an actual and real event, not perhaps an event occurring in a single moment of time or history, but notwithstanding this reservation an event that has actually happened both in a cosmic and in a historical sense."

A 2001 survey by "Faith Communities Today" found that 18% of Unitarian Universalists (UU) consider themselves to be atheists, with 54% considering themselves humanist. According to this study 16% of UUs consider themselves Buddhist, 13% Christian, and 13% Pagan.

=== Islam ===
In Islam, atheists are categorized as kafir (كافر), a term that is also used to describe polytheists (shirk), and that translates roughly as "denier" or "concealer". Kafir carries connotations of blasphemy and disconnection from the Islamic community. In Arabic, "atheism" is generally translated ilhad (إلحاد), although this also means "heresy". A person who denies the existence of a creator is called dahriya.

The Quran is silent on the punishment for apostasy, though not the subject itself. The Quran speaks repeatedly of people going back to unbelief after believing, and gives advice on dealing with "hypocrites":

Sura 9:73,74

"O Prophet, just disregard the unbelievers and the hypocrites, and be firm against them. Their abode is Hell,-- an evil refuge indeed. They swear by God that they said nothing [evil], but indeed they uttered blasphemy, and they did it after accepting Islam; and they meditated a plot which they were unable to carry out: this revenge of theirs was [their] only return for the bounty which God and His Apostle had enriched them! If they repent, it will be best for them; but if they turn back [to their evil ways], God will punish them with a grievous penalty in this life and in the Hereafter. They shall have none on this earth to protect or help them."

— Qur'an, sura 9 (At-Tawba), ayat 73-73

Muslims are not at liberty to change their religion or become atheists. Atheists in Islamic countries and communities frequently conceal their non-belief.

Religiosity in the Arab world is seen to be essential for morality and atheism is widely associated with immorality. Religious attitudes have grown more conservative since the 1980s, compared to the preceding decades when secular socialism was politically dominant. Nonetheless, atheism is tolerated if it is not conspicuous and a worldwide support network for ex-Muslims has existed since 2007. Some commentators believe that the number of undeclared atheists in the Arab world is substantial. According to 2012 WIN/Gallup poll of Saudi citizens, 5 percent of Saudis identify as "convinced atheists", the same percentage as in the U.S.

The increasingly large ex-Muslim communities in the Western world that adhere to no religion have been well documented. Darren E. Sherkat questioned in Foreign Affairs whether some of the Muslim growth projections are accurate as they do not take into account the increasing number of non-religious Muslims. Quantitative research is lacking, but he believes the European trend mirrors the American: data from the General Social Survey in the United States show that 32 percent of those raised Muslim no longer embrace Islam in adulthood, and 18 percent hold no religious identification. Studies show that about half of the 4.2 million persons from Muslim background in Germany no longer embrace Islam in adulthood.

== Indian religions ==
Atheism is often considered acceptable within Hinduism, Jainism and Buddhism in India.

=== Hinduism ===
Who really knows?
Who will here proclaim it?
Whence was it produced? Whence is this creation?
The gods came afterwards, with the creation of this universe.
Who then knows whence it has arisen?

— Nasadiya Sukta, concerns the origin of the universe, Rig Veda, 10:129-6

Atheism is a valid form of belief in Hinduism. Certain Hindu schools however view the path of the atheist as a very difficult to follow in matters of spirituality.

Among the six fundamental Astika schools of Hindu philosophy, the Samkhya do not accept God and the early Mimamsa also rejected the notion of God. Samkhya lacks the notion of a 'higher being' that is the ground of all existence. It proposes a thoroughly dualistic understanding of the cosmos, in which two parallel realities (Purusha, the spiritual, and Prakriti, the physical) coexist and the aim of life is the gaining of liberating self-knowledge of the Purusha. Here, no God (better stated theos) is present, yet Ultimate Reality in the form of the Purusha exists.

Cārvāka (also Charvaka) was a materialist and atheist school of thought in India, which is now known principally from fragments cited by its Astika and Buddhist opponents. The proper aim of a Cārvākan, according to these sources, was to live a prosperous, happy, productive life in this world (cf Epicureanism). There is some evidence that the school persisted until at least 1578.

=== Jainism ===
Jainism believes that the emancipated soul is itself God. Jains do not believe in a creator God, but there is belief in numerous gods within the cosmos.

=== Buddhism ===
Buddhism is often described as non-theistic, since Buddhist authorities and canonical texts do not affirm, and sometimes deny, the following:

- The existence of a creation, and therefore of a creator deity
- That a god (deva), gods, or other divine beings are the source of moral imperatives. Instead, the Dharma is an attribution of the universe
- That human beings or other creatures are responsible to a god or gods for their actions

All canonical Buddhist texts that mention the subject accept the existence (as distinct from the authority) of a great number of spiritual beings, including the Vedic deities. From the point of view of Western theism, certain concepts of the Buddha found in the Mahayana school of Buddhism, e.g. of Amitabha or the Adibuddha may seem to share characteristics with Western concepts of God, but Gautama Buddha himself denied that he was a god or divine.

== Chinese religions ==
Some forms of Confucianism and Taoism do not explicitly affirm, nor are they founded upon faith in, a higher being or beings. However, Confucian writings do have numerous references to Tian (Heaven), which denotes a transcendent power, with a personal connotation. Neo-Confucian writings, such as that of Chu Hsi, are vague on whether their conception of the Great Ultimate is like a personal deity or not. Although the Western translation of the Tao as "god" in some editions of the Tao te Ching, this is highly misleading. It is still a matter of debate whether the actual descriptions of the Tao by Laozi have theistic or nontheistic undertones. Religious forms of Taoism do believe in a variety of cosmological beings, which are analogies to the cosmic forces within the universe.

== Other religions ==
Religions that can be described as grey areas, and do not belong in the aforementioned categories, such as Unitarian Universalism.

=== Unitarian Universalism ===
Unitarian Universalism (UU) is a liberal religion, first founded when Unitarians and Universalists came together in 1961. According to the Unitarian Universalist Association, atheists and agnostics are accepted and welcomed into the UU religion. 'People with atheist and agnostic beliefs find a supportive community in our congregations. We are pro-science, pro-reason, and pro-Evolution...Unitarian Universalism honors the differing paths we each travel. Our congregations are places where we celebrate, support, and challenge one another as we continue on these journeys.' The UU also accepts Christians, and many other religions who believe in a higher being, but it is not restricted - the UUA says that 'Unitarian Universalists are agnostic, theist, atheist, and everything in between.'

== Satanism ==
LaVeyan Satanism is nontheistic, rejecting belief in God and all other deities, including Satan. "Satanism begins with atheism," said Church of Satan High Priest Peter H. Gilmore in an interview. "We begin with the universe and say, 'It’s indifferent. There’s no God, there’s no Devil. No one cares!'" The function of God is performed and satisfied by the Satanist themself. The needs of worship, ritual, and religious/spiritual focus are directed inwards towards the Satanist, as opposed to outwards, towards a deity. It rejects concepts such as prayer, the afterlife, and divine forces. The First Satanic Church also practices LaVeyan Satanism.

== Legal status of atheism ==
World map showing: Countries that formerly practiced state atheism Countries that currently practice state atheism

Countries with state religion: Christianity (unspecified) Protestantism and Anglicanism Orthodox Christianity Catholicism / Islam (unspecified) Sunni Islam Shi'a Islam Buddhism

Legal treatment of atheism has in the past and continues to vary tremendously across different jurisdictions. Three major types of national regime exist: state atheism, where atheism is supported by the government; state religion, where a specific religion or sect is supported by the state, and a secular state which supports neither. Most ancient civilizations (from city-states to empires) had state religions; most modern countries are secular. State atheism is currently practiced in China and Vietnam, but unlike the strongly enforced bans on religious worship in the early Soviet Union and after the Communist Revolution in China, freedom of religion is currently established by law in both China and Vietnam, and respected in practice to some degree (see Freedom of religion in China and Freedom of religion in Vietnam). The minority of modern countries with state religions have established interpretations of either Christianity, Islam, or Buddhism.

Countries with state religions range from those with extremely tolerant laws, like the United Kingdom, to those where the police enforce daily prayer, like Saudi Arabia. Under the millet system of the Ottoman Empire, separate systems of family law are enforced by religious authorities for their separate communities. This system was inherited by and is still in use to various degrees in various Middle Eastern countries, including Iraq, Syria, Jordan, Lebanon, Israel, the Palestinian Authority, Egypt, and Greece (for religious minorities). Similar separate systems are used in India, Iran, Pakistan and Bangladesh. These systems sometimes create legal problems for atheists and couples of different religions. Atheists may be forced to declare an approved religion, or may be assigned one based on their ethnicity.

Even in counties where freedom of religion is guaranteed by the constitution or other fundamental law, practices or beliefs of a specific religion might be reflected in ostensibly secular codes. For example, blue laws in some Christian countries have enforced certain observances of the Sabbath on Sunday, for example by banning alcohol sales or forcing businesses to close. Laws surrounding nudity, pornography, abortion, contraception, homosexuality, gambling, alcohol, tobacco often track religious sensibilities, though some argue that these are cultural rather than religious prohibitions, though there may be an influence of religious thinking on culture. Major early transitions from state religions to secular states in Western Christiandom were noted in Colonial North America, the American Revolution, and the French Revolution. Prohibitions against state support for any particular religion or against required participation are not always enforced, particularly early in this transition process, and local laws in strongly religious communities may conflict with higher-level law. For example, official school prayer was allowed in the United States until 1962. Freedom of religion was affirmed in nearly all countries in 1966 by the International Covenant on Civil and Political Rights. Despite having no state religion, the German government collects religious taxes for the constituents of several religions; the fee for leaving a religious body has been challenged by atheists.

Some states, regardless of state endorsement of a religion, protect major religions against insult (which may include profession of atheism or criticism of religion by atheists), including Indonesia. Other religious crimes which may cause legal problems for atheists include heresy, blasphemy, apostasy.

=== Canada ===
In Canada, atheists have set up "atheist churches" however in 2019, the Federal Court of Canada ruled in Church of Atheism of Central Canada v Canada (National Revenue) that atheism was not a religion and not entitled to tax-exempt charitable status.

=== Great Britain (English Law) ===
The chief law officer is called Lord Chancellor and holds the title of 'the conscience of the monarch. British subjects have a long history of religious upheaval from the time when Henry VIII of England ordered the English Reformation. There followed a long period of alternate suppressions and liberalizations until, following the Restoration when common law became progressively more descriptive than prescriptive, judges were allowed some latitude in determining guilt (which is why English law is so ambiguous). British "religious atheists" are numerous and might include George Fox and, notably Jeremy Bentham, whose body is displayed in the South Cloister of University College London.

=== United States ===
Atheism in the United States is protected under the First Amendment's Free Exercise Clause. There are also online churches that have been created by atheists to secure legal rights, to ordain atheist clergy to hold ceremonies, as well as for parody, education, and advocacy.

In 1797, the United States Senate ratified the Treaty of Tripoli, which stated in Article 11:

As the Government of the United States of America is not, in any sense, founded on the Christian religion; as it has in itself no character of enmity against the laws, religion, or tranquility, of Mussulmen; and, as the said States never entered into any war, or act of hostility against any Mahometan nation, it is declared by the parties, that no pretext arising from religious opinions, shall ever produce an interruption of the harmony existing between the two countries.

== See also ==
- Nontheistic religions
- Separation of church and state
- Religion and atheism in the films of Luis Buñuel
