= Housekeeping deal =

Film distribution agreement

A housekeeping deal is the practice of a film studio giving a producer or leading actor office space on the studio lot in return for the first right to distribute all of his or her upcoming projects. The business practice has evolved in recent years as a way to keep creative talent in house, reminiscent of the Hollywood studio system. Though industry players initially thought there would be a backlash to the practice, independent producers have embraced the system as a way to lower their overhead and increase the chances of getting their projects funded. The studio can incur large costs from high-profile housekeeping deals which have become less common during economic down turns. Many such "vanity deals" with name Hollywood actors have not generated returns for the studios, so that often an actor's production company is not renewed to stay on the lot after the specified contract is up.
