= Plays the Music of Twin Peaks =

Studio album by Xiu Xiu
- Released: April 16, 2016
- Genre: Experimental rock; ambient; post-rock
- Length: 68:37
- Label: Polyvinyl; Bella Union
- Producer: Xiu Xiu; Jherek Bischoff

Xiu Xiu chronology
Merzxiu (2015)	Plays the Music of Twin Peaks (2016)	Forget (2017)

Plays the Music of Twin Peaks is a tribute album by American experimental band Xiu Xiu. Composed of cover versions of the music from the Twin Peaks soundtrack, it was released exclusively as a Record Store Day release on April 16, 2016, by Polyvinyl in the United States and Bella Union in Europe. It was produced by former Xiu Xiu member Jherek Bischoff and mixed by Deerhoof member Greg Saunier.

The covers were originally commissioned by Queensland Gallery of Modern Art for a 2015 exhibition, “David Lynch: Between Two Worlds”. Following the live performances at the exhibition, the band decided to record the covers in the studio. In accompaniment to the album, Xiu Xiu embarked on a Europe tour in April 2016. In the same month, the band released a shared music video for the tracks "Into the Night" and "Nightsea Wind", directed by Diego Barrera.

== Critical reception ==
Professional ratings
Aggregate scores
Source	Rating
Metacritic	80/100
Review scores
Source	Rating
AllMusic	3.5/5 stars
Pitchfork	7.7/10
Under the Radar	8/10

Benjamin Scheim of Pitchfork was positive in his review of the album, stating: "In evoking Lynch and Badalamenti, Xiu Xiu have made one of their most beautiful and listenable albums, one that highlights everything the band does well while shaving down the rough edges that often turn away foes and friends alike."

== Track listing ==
All music is composed by Angelo Badalamenti.

No.	Title	Lyrics	Originally featured on	Length
1.	"Laura Palmer's Theme"		Soundtrack from Twin Peaks (1990)	5:04
2.	"Into the Night"	David Lynch	Floating into the Night (1989)	5:13
3.	"Audrey's Dance"		Soundtrack from Twin Peaks	4:27
4.	"Packard's Vibration"		Twin Peaks Music: Season Two Music and More (2007)	3:48
5.	"Nightsea Wind"		The Twin Peaks Archive (2011)	7:07
6.	"Blue Frank / Pink Room"		Twin Peaks Music: Season Two Music and More / Twin Peaks: Fire Walk with Me (1992)	5:52
7.	"Sycamore Tree"	D. Lynch	Twin Peaks: Fire Walk with Me	6:48
8.	"Harold's Theme"		Twin Peaks Music: Season Two Music and More	3:56
9.	"Dance of the Dream Man"		Soundtrack from Twin Peaks	5:10
10.	"Falling"	D. Lynch	Floating into the Night	6:57
11.	"Love Theme Farewell"		Soundtrack from Twin Peaks	6:25
12.	"Josie's Past"	Jennifer Lynch; Milton Drake; Al Hoffman; Jerry Livingston		7:50
Total length:				68:37

Notes

- "Blue Frank / Pink Room" contains a sample of "Madicuss" (2012), performed by Xiu Xiu.
- "Josie's Past" contains a monologue taken from The Secret Diary of Laura Palmer (1990), a spin-off novel written by Jennifer Lynch; and an interpolation of "Mairzy Doats" (1943), written and composed by Drake, Hoffman and Livingston, as performed by Leland Palmer (portrayed Ray Wise) in "Episode 8".

== Personnel ==
Xiu Xiu

- Jamie Stewart — vocals, guitar, synthesizers, noises, drum machine, production
- Angela Seo — piano, synthesizers, cymbals, production
- Shayna Dunkelman — vibraphone, percussion, drums, synthesizers, production, spoken word (on "Josie's Past")

Technical personnel

- Jherek Bischoff — production, bass guitar, double bass
- Greg Saunier — mixing

== Release history ==
Region	Date	Label
United States	April 16, 2016	Polyvinyl
Europe	April 16, 2016	Bella Union
