= Music of Twin Peaks =

Media franchise discography

"Twin Peaks Theme"
A 30 second sample of Angelo Badalamenti's Twin Peaks theme

The music of the American surrealist mystery-horror drama television series Twin Peaks, its 1992 prequel film Twin Peaks: Fire Walk with Me, and its 2017 revival was composed by Angelo Badalamenti. Twin Peaks' co-creator David Lynch wrote lyrics for five songs used throughout the series—including "Falling", "The Nightingale", "Into the Night", "Just You", and "Sycamore Trees"—and three songs featured in Twin Peaks: Fire Walk with Me, including "A Real Indication", "Questions in a World of Blue" and "The Black Dog Runs at Night". Julee Cruise, who made cameo appearances in both the series and film, provided vocals for four of Lynch's and Badalamenti's collaborations, and jazz vocalist Jimmy Scott performed on "Sycamore Trees". Three of the series' actors—James Marshall, Lara Flynn Boyle, and Sheryl Lee—provided vocals for "Just You".

Badalamenti's compositions have been released on four soundtrack albums: Soundtrack from Twin Peaks (1990), Twin Peaks: Fire Walk with Me (1992), Twin Peaks Music: Season Two Music and More (2007) and Twin Peaks: Limited Event Series Original Soundtrack (2017). Starting in March 2011, David Lynch began distributing The Twin Peaks Archive, a collection of previously unreleased and unused songs on his official website for digital download. In total, 215 songs were made available for download.

Twin Peaks: Visual Soundtrack is a LaserDisc that plays like an elaborate music video. The show's entire soundtrack album is played over silent video footage shot by a Japanese TV crew visiting the Snoqualmie, Washington locations where the series was shot.

For the revival series, two soundtracks were released on September 8, 2017, by Rhino Records: Twin Peaks: Music from the Limited Event Series and Twin Peaks: Limited Event Series Original Soundtrack. The first contained a majority of the performances at the Roadhouse and preexisting songs used throughout the third season, and the second is the score to the series' third season, including previously unreleased Angelo Badalamenti compositions.

Twin Peaks' music has received widespread critical acclaim. The Guardian has said that the original soundtrack "still marks the summit of TV soundtracks" and AllMusic reviewer Stephen Eddins has referred to it as "a model of film music ideally matched to the images and actions it underscores." The main theme song to Twin Peaks, composed by Badalamenti, also received the 1991 Grammy Award for Best Pop Instrumental Performance.

== Discography ==
| Title | Artist | Notes |
|---|---|---|
| Soundtrack from Twin Peaks (also known as Music from Twin Peaks): Release date: September 11, 1990; Label: Warner Bros.; Format: CD, Cassette (CS), LP | Angelo Badalamenti | Composed of music from the first season of Twin Peaks. |
| Twin Peaks: Fire Walk with Me: Release date: August 7, 1992; Label: Warner Bros.; Format: CD, CS, LP | Angelo Badalamenti | Soundtrack to the film. |
| Twin Peaks Music: Season Two Music and More: Release date: October 7, 2007; Label: Absurda, David Lynch; Format: CD | Angelo Badalamenti & David Lynch | Composed of music from the second season of Twin Peaks. |
| The Twin Peaks Archive: Release date: March 10, 2011–July 13, 2012; Label: David Lynch; Format: Digital download | Angelo Badalamenti & David Lynch | An ongoing digital series of rare music from both the original series and the film. Songs were available for download in bundles, released weekly over the course of a year. |
| Anthology Resource Vol. 1: △△: Release date: August 7, 2017; Label: Sacred Bones; Format: Digital download | Dean Hurley | Ambient instrumental underscore and soundscapes from the third season. |
| Twin Peaks: Music from the Limited Event Series: Release date: September 8, 2017; Label: Rhino; Format: CD, 2xLP | Various Artists | A compilation of various songs performed on third season. |
| Twin Peaks: Limited Event Series Original Soundtrack: Release date: September 8, 2017; Label: Rhino; Format: CD, 2xLP | Angelo Badalamenti | Soundtrack to the third season. |

== The Twin Peaks Archive ==
The Twin Peaks Archive

Soundtrack album by Angelo Badalamenti and David Lynch
- Released: March 10, 2011 – July 13, 2012
- Recorded: 1989–1992
- Genres: Jazz; ambient
- Length: 591:07
- Label: David Lynch
- Producers: Angelo Badalamenti; David Lynch

The Twin Peaks Archive is a digital soundtrack album by American director David Lynch and by American composer Angelo Badalamenti. The album features rare and unreleased tracks from both Twin Peaks series as well as the prequel film.

On March 10, 2011, davidlynch.com relaunched as a site dedicated to the music of David Lynch and his collaborators. One of the features of the site was The Twin Peaks Archive, described as an "open album" with previously unreleased tracks from Twin Peaks and Twin Peaks: Fire Walk with Me being released on a regular basis. Many of the tracks streamed for free on the site, set to photo slide shows featuring images from the series and movie. They were also available for purchase as MP3s or Apple Lossless files. Related tracks were released individually or in bundles ranging from two to 15 tracks each. The Archive concluded on July 13, 2012, after which the bundles were collapsed and sold as a single set. There are currently no plans for a physical release.

As of February 8, 2024, the online store offering the Twin Peaks Archive Bundle was no longer active. It appears there is no legal way to obtain The Twin Peaks Archive. The entire track set appears to be available on YouTube.

Deer Meadow Shuffle

Released March 10, 2011

1. Deer Meadow Shuffle
2. Deer Meadow Shuffle (Film Version)

Just You (Instrumental Baritone Guitar)

Released March 14, 2011

1. Just You (Instrumental Baritone Guitar)*

Twin Peaks Theme (Alternate Version)

Released March 17, 2011

1. Twin Peaks Theme (Alternate Version)

Annie And Cooper

Released March 25, 2011

1. Annie And Cooper

Nightsea Wind

Released March 29, 2011

1. Nightsea Wind

Freshly Squeezed (Bass Clarinet)

Released April 4, 2011

1. Freshly Squeezed (Bass Clarinet)

Twin Peaks Theme (Nostalgia Version)

Released April 11, 2011

1. Twin Peaks (Nostalgia Version)
2. Twin Peaks (Harp And Guitar)
3. Twin Peaks (Solo Rhodes)

Mysterioso #2

Released April 18, 2011

1. Mysterioso #1
2. Mysterioso #1 (Film Version)
3. Mysterioso #2*
4. Mysterioso #2 (Film Version)

Love Theme from Twin Peaks (Alternate Version)

Released April 25, 2011

1. Love Theme (Alternate Version)
2. Love Theme (Solo Rhodes)

Americana

Released May 2, 2011

1. Americana
2. James Hurley (Outtake)*

RR Diner Bundle

Released May 9, 2011

1. Mister Snooty
2. Freshly Squeezed (Fast Cool Jazz Version)*
3. Picking On Country
4. I'm Hurt Bad (Industrial Symphony No. 1 Version)
5. Western Ballad
6. Preparing For M.T. Wentz
7. Secret Country

Dark Mood Woods (Full Version)

Released May 16, 2011

1. Dark Mood Woods (Full Version)

RR Swing

Released May 23, 2011

1. RR Swing

Great Northern Piano Bundle

Released June 1, 2011

1. Great Northern Piano Tune #1
2. Great Northern Piano Tune #2 (Truman And Josie)
3. Great Northern Piano Tune #3
4. Twin Peaks (Solo Piano)

Girl Talk

Released June 8, 2011

1. Girl Talk
2. Birds in Hell

Audrey's Prayer (Synth Version)

Released Jun 15th, 2011

1. Audrey's Prayer (Synth Version)
2. Audrey's Prayer (Clarinet & Synth)

The Norwegians / Sneaky Audrey / Freshly Squeezed (Solo Vibraphone)

Released June 22, 2011

1. The Norwegians
2. Sneaky Audrey
3. Freshly Squeezed (Solo Vibraphone)

Miss Twin Peaks Bundle

Released June 29, 2011

1. Miss Twin Peaks (Piano Rehearsal)*
2. Miss Twin Peaks Theme
3. Lana's Dance
4. Lucy's Dance
5. Miss Twin Peaks (Finale)

Sycamore Trees (Instrumental)

Released July 7, 2011

1. Sycamore Trees (Instrumental)

Dr. Jacoby Bundle

Released July 14, 2011

1. South Sea Dreams
2. Hula Hoopin'
3. Love Theme (Piano And Rhodes)

Owl Cave

Released July 21, 2011

1. Owl Cave

Slow Speed Orchestra Bundle #1

Released July 28, 2011

1. Slow Speed Orchestra 1 (24 Hours)
2. Slow Speed Orchestra 2 (Unease Motif / The Woods)
3. Slow Speed Orchestra 3 (Black Lodge Rumble)
4. Half Speed Orchestra 1 (Stair Music / Danger Theme)
5. Half Speed Orchestra 2 (Dark Forces)
6. Half Speed Orchestra 3 (Windom Earle's Motif)

James Visits Laura

Released August 4, 2011

1. James Visits Laura

Diary Bundle

Released August 11, 2011

1. Harold's Theme (The Living Novel)
2. Harold's Theme (Josie's Past)
3. Laura Palmer's Theme (Ethereal Pad Version)
4. Laura Palmer's Theme (Ghost Version)
5. Laura Palmer's Theme (Guardian Angel Version)

Dance of the Dream Man (Solo Sax)

Released August 19, 2011

1. Dance of the Dream Man (Solo Sax)

Solo Percussion Bundle

Released August 25, 2011

1. Solo Percussion 1
2. Solo Percussion 2 (Grady's Waltz)
3. Solo Percussion 3
4. Audrey's Dance (Percussion & Clarinets)

Northwest Gulch

Released September 1, 2011

1. Northwest Gulch

Dance of the Dream Man Bundle

Released September 15, 2011

1. Dance of the Dream Man (Drums & Bass)
2. Dance of the Dream Man (Solo Clarinet)
3. Dance of the Dream Man (Solo Clarinet 2)
4. Dance of the Dream Man (Solo Flute)
5. Dance of the Dream Man (Solo Bass)

Just You (Instrumental)

Released September 15, 2011

1. Just You (Instrumental)

Bookhouse Boys

Released September 23, 2011

1. The Bookhouse Boys
2. The Bookhouse Boys (Solo Guitar)

Unreleased Themes Bundle

Released October 4, 2011

1. Hank's Theme (Version 2)
2. Earle's Theme
3. Hank's Theme
4. Invitation to Love (Bumper)
5. Half Speed Orchestra 5 (Leo's Theme)
6. Invitation to Love Theme
7. Invitation to Love (Lover's Dilemma)
8. Lana's Theme
9. Horne's Theme (also known as Josie's Web)
10. Wheeler's Theme

Freshly Squeezed Bundle

Released November 10, 2011

1. Freshly Squeezed (Complete Version)
2. Freshly Squeezed (Clarinet)
3. Freshly Squeezed (Flute)
4. Freshly Squeezed (Mid-Tempo Version)
5. Freshly Squeezed (Fast Cool Jazz Version 2)
6. Freshly Squeezed (Fast Cool Jazz Solo Bass)
7. Freshly Squeezed (Solo Bass Clarinet)
8. Freshly Squeezed (Solo Clarinet)
9. Freshly Squeezed (Solo Flute)

The Mill Deal

Released November 18, 2011

1. The Mill Deal
2. Josie And Jonathan
3. The Mill Fire

Fire Walk With Me Bundle

Released December 8, 2011

1. Theme from Twin Peaks - Fire Walk With Me (Saxophone)
2. Teresa's Autopsy
3. Phillip Jeffries
4. Back To Fat Trout (Unease Motif / The Woods)
5. Laura Visits Harold
6. Behind The Mask
7. Wash Your Hands
8. It's Your Father
9. Jacques' Cabin / The Train Car
10. Circumference Of A Circle

Dark Mood Woods (Studio Version)

Released December 16, 2011

1. Dark Mood Woods (Studio Version)
2. One-Eyed Jack's Parlor Music*
3. Twin Peaks Christmas Greeting†

Dance of the Dream Man (Fast Soprano Clarinet)

Released January 12, 2012

1. Dance of the Dream Man (Fast Soprano Clarinet)
2. Laura Palmer's Theme (Baritone Guitar Punctuation)
3. Leo Returns

Laura Palmer's Theme Bundle

Released January 20, 2012

1. Laura Palmer's Theme (Dark Synth)
2. Laura Palmer's Theme (Solo Piano)
3. Laura Palmer's Theme (Vibraphone)
4. Laura Palmer's Theme (Letter from Harold)
5. Laura Palmer's Theme (Caroline)
6. Laura Palmer's Theme (Clarinet Bridge)
7. Laura Palmer's Theme (Clarinet Strings Bridge)
8. Laura Palmer's Theme (Piano Bridge)
9. Laura Palmer's Theme (Piano A) (TK1)
10. Laura Palmer's Theme (Piano A) (TK2)
11. Laura Palmer's Theme (Piano A) (TK3)
12. Laura Palmer's Theme (Piano A) (TK4)
13. Laura Palmer's Theme (Piano A) (TK5)
14. Laura Palmer's Theme (Piano B) (TK1)*
15. Laura Palmer's Theme (Piano B) (TK2)*

Abstract Mood

Released February 3, 2012

1. Abstract Mood
2. Abstract Mood (Slow Version)

White Lodge Rumble

Released February 10, 2012

1. Slow Speed Orchestra 4 (White Lodge Rumble)

Harold's Theme/Audrey's Prayer

Released February 17, 2012

1. Harold's Theme (Harpsichord)
2. Audrey's Prayer (Flute)

Audrey's Dance / Sneaky Audrey Bundle

Released March 8, 2012

1. Audrey's Dance (Clean)
2. Audrey's Dance (Drums And Bass)
3. Audrey's Dance (Solo Rhodes)
4. Audrey's Dance (Synth And Vibraphone)
5. Audrey's Dance (Clean Fast)
6. Audrey's Dance / Dance Of The Dream Man (Saxophone)*
7. Audrey's Dance / Dance Of The Dream Man (Clarinet)*
8. Audrey's Dance / Dance Of The Dream Man (Flute)*
9. Sneaky Audrey (Audrey's Investigation)
10. Sneaky Audrey (Solo)
11. Sneaky Audrey (Alternate)

One Armed Man Theme (Solo Clarinet Improvisation)

Released March 15, 2012

1. One-Armed Man's Theme (Solo Clarinet Improvisation)

Great Northern Bundle #2

Released March 22, 2012

1. Great Northern Big Band
2. Wedding Hymn
3. Wedding Song 1
4. Wedding Song 2 ('Stranger Nights')
5. Wedding Song 3 (Accordion)
6. Attack of the Pine Weasel
7. Great Northern Piano Tune #4
8. Twin Peaks Theme (Harp)

Ben's Battle

Released March 29, 2012

1. Ben's Battle
2. Ben's Battle (Solo Percussion)
3. Ben's Battle (Solo Flute)*
4. Ben's Battle (Solo Trumpet)
5. Ben's Lament

Black Lodge Bundle

Released April 6, 2012

1. Half Speed Orchestra 4 (Dugpas)
2. Half Speed Orchestra 6 (Bob's Dance / Back To Missoula)
3. Half Speed Orchestra 7*
4. The Culmination
5. Distant Train
6. Laura's Dark Boogie (Clean)
7. The Red Room

Love Theme (Dark)

Released April 12, 2012

1. Love Theme (Dark)

James & Evelyn Bundle

Released April 19, 2012

1. James and Evelyn
2. Eveyln's Mourning
3. Eveyln's Mourning (Extended)*
4. La Speranza
5. Trail Mix*

Dark Intro Bundle

Released May 3, 2012. All tracks were unused in the show or film.

1. Dark Intro #1
2. Dark Intro #2
3. Dark Intro #3
4. Dark Intro #4
5. Dark Intro #5
6. Dark Intro #6

Packard's Theme

Released May 10, 2012

1. Packard's Theme
2. The Mill Dirge

Odds and Ends Vol. 1

Released May 31, 2012

1. Jean Renault's Theme (Solo Bass Clarinet)
2. One-Eyed Jack's Country
3. Dick Tremayne's Swing (Screen Edit)
4. Dick Tremayne's Swing
5. Llama Country
6. 'Such Stuff as Dreams Are Made Of'
7. Earle's Theme (Audrey's Walk)
8. Leo Attacks Bobby
9. The Pink Room (Extended Version)

Odds and Ends Vol. 2

Released June 14, 2012

1. Half Heart (Solo)
2. Dance of the Dream Man (Original)
3. Great Northern Piano Tune #2 (Full Version)
4. One Armed Man's Theme & Jean Renault's Theme (TV Mix)
5. Audrey (TV Version)
6. Voice Of Love (Slow)
7. Log Lady Presence

Odds and Ends Vol. 3

Released June 28, 2012

1. Love Theme (Light)
2. Wheeler's Theme (Take 2)
3. Solo Percussion 4
4. Freshly Squeezed (Fast Cool Jazz Version 2 Clean)
5. Solo Percussion (Arbitrary Cymbals)
6. You Killed Mike

An Ending - Demos and More

Released July 12, 2012. All tracks were unused in the show or film.

1. Falling into Love Theme (Demo)
2. Love Theme Slower And Darker (Demo)
3. Slow Cool Jazz (Demo)
4. Chinese Theme (Demo)
5. Wide Vibrato Augmented Chords (Demo)
6. Night Walk (Demo)
7. Low Wide and Beautiful (Demo)
8. Wide Vibrato Mood to Falling (Demo)
9. Love Theme to Falling (Demo)
10. Love Theme Light (Demo)
11. Questions in a World of Blue (Demo)
12. Love Theme from 'On The Air' (Take 4)
13. Love Theme from 'On The Air' (Slow Jazz Version)
14. Love Theme from 'On The Air' (Clarinet Strings)
- *: unused in series or film
- †: used as promotional bumper

A number of changes were made over the period between each bundle's individual release and the final version:

- The Diary Bundle originally mistitled "Laura Palmer's Theme (Guardian Angel Version)" as "Laura Palmer's Theme (Letter From Harold)"; that version was later released in the Laura Palmer's Theme Bundle.
- The Laura Palmer's Theme Bundle included an extra track, Piano A TK4, which was a duplicate of the previous track. It was later removed and Piano A TK5 was renamed.
- "Evelyn's Mourning (Extended)" was found to have been a mislabelled mix that included components of "Laura Palmer's Theme (Solo Piano)". It was replaced with the correct version.
- "Dick Tremayne's Swing (Screen Edit)" was found to have been a fanmade edit, and removed.
- "Love Theme (Light)" was discovered to be a clip of "Love Theme (Dark)".
- "Freshly Squeezed (Fast Cool Jazz Clarinet)" was found to be a duplicate of "Dance of the Dream Man (Fast Soprano Clarinet)", and was removed.
- For the final release, "Harold's Theme (Josie's Past)" was moved from its original placement in the Diary Bundle to the end of the Unreleased Themes Bundle.

== Cover versions ==
American experimental band Xiu Xiu covered tracks off the soundtrack on its 2016 cover album, Xiu Xiu Plays the Music of Twin Peaks.

== Bibliography ==
- Kathryn Kalinak, "Disturbing the Guests with This Racket: Music and Twin Peaks", in David Livery, Full of Secrets: Critical Approaches to Twin Peaks, Detroit, Wayne State University Press, 1995, pp. 82–92.
