= Twin Peaks: Limited Event Series Original Soundtrack =

Soundtrack album by Angelo Badalamenti
- Released: September 8, 2017
- Length: 77:02
- Label: Rhino
- Producers: Angelo Badalamenti; David Lynch

Professional ratings
Review scores
Source	Rating
AllMusic	4/5 stars
Consequence of Sound	B+

Twin Peaks: Limited Event Series Original Soundtrack is a soundtrack album by American composer Angelo Badalamenti. It was released on September 8, 2017, by Rhino Entertainment. The album is the score to the Twin Peaks revival series, and includes previously unreleased compositions by Badalamenti.

An additional soundtrack, which featured music performed and featured diegetically on the revival series, was concurrently released as Twin Peaks: Music from the Limited Event Series.

== Track listing ==
All tracks are written by Angelo Badalamenti, except where noted.

No.	Title	Writer(s)	Performer(s)	Length
1.	"Twin Peaks Theme"	Badalamenti; David Lynch	Angelo Badalamenti	5:04
2.	"American Woman" (David Lynch remix)	Jessy Wilson; Kallie North; Butch Walker; Jason White	Muddy Magnolias	4:13
3.	"Laura Palmer's Theme" (Love Theme from Twin Peaks)		Angelo Badalamenti	4:49
4.	"Accident / Farewell Theme"		Angelo Badalamenti	3:13
5.	"Grady Groove"		Angelo Badalamenti featuring Grady Tate	1:40
6.	"Windswept" (reprise)	Johnny Jewel; Nat Walker	Johnny Jewel	3:53
7.	"Dark Mood Woods / The Red Room"		Angelo Badalamenti	5:42
8.	"The Chair"		Angelo Badalamenti	4:31
9.	"Deer Meadow Shuffle"		Angelo Badalamenti	4:33
10.	"Threnody to the Victims of Hiroshima"	Krzysztof Penderecki	Warsaw National Philharmonic Orchestra and Witold Rowicki	9:30
11.	"Slow 30's Room"	Lynch; Dean Hurley	David Lynch and Dean Hurley	2:06
12.	"The Fireman"		Angelo Badalamenti	7:13
13.	"Saturday" (instrumental)	Jewel; Adam Miller; N. Walker	Chromatics	3:14
14.	"Headless Chicken"	Badalamenti; Lynch	Thought Gang	2:44
15.	"Night"		Angelo Badalamenti	2:44
16.	"Heartbreaking"		Angelo Badalamenti	4:10
17.	"Audrey's Dance"		Angelo Badalamenti	5:28
18.	"Dark Space Low"		Angelo Badalamenti	2:15
Total length:				77:02

== Personnel ==
Credits adapted from the liner notes of Twin Peaks: Limited Event Series Original Soundtrack.

- Angelo Badalamenti – executive production
- Mike Bozzi – mastering
- Jim Bruening – score co-production
- Stacy Conde – project supervision
- Jason Day – project supervision
- Kate Dear – art direction
- Dean Hurley – album assembly, music supervision
- David Lynch – cover, design, executive production
- Suzanne Tenner – photography

== Charts ==
Chart (2017)	Peak position
Finnish Albums (Suomen virallinen lista)	36
UK Soundtrack Albums (Official Charts)	6
US Soundtrack Albums (Billboard)	13
