= Industrial Symphony No. 1 =

1989 stage production by David Lynch

- Directed by: David Lynch
- Written by: David Lynch; Angelo Badalamenti
- Produced by: David Lynch; Angelo Badalamenti; John Wentworth
- Starring: Laura Dern; Nicolas Cage; Julee Cruise; Michael J. Anderson
- Cinematography: John Schwartzman
- Edited by: Bob Jenkis; Mary Sweeney
- Music by: Angelo Badalamenti; David Lynch; Julee Cruise (vocals)
- Distributed by: Warner Home Video
- Release date: 1990
- Running time: 50 minutes
- Language: English

Industrial Symphony No. 1: The Dream of the Broken Hearted is a 1990 avant-garde concert performance directed by David Lynch, with music by Angelo Badalamenti and Julee Cruise. It stars Nicolas Cage, Laura Dern, Michael J. Anderson, and Cruise. The film, whose duration is 50 minutes, was described as a musical.

== Background ==
When David Lynch studied at the Pennsylvania Academy of Fine Arts in Philadelphia (PAFA), he made a series of complex mosaics in geometric shapes which he called Industrial Symphonies.

The play was originally presented on stage at the Brooklyn Academy of Music in New York City as part of the New Music America Festival on November 10, 1989. Footage from these performances was used for the home video release.

== Cast ==
- Nicolas Cage as Heartbreaker
- Laura Dern as Heartbroken Woman
- Julee Cruise as The Dreamself of the Heartbroken Woman
- Michael J. Anderson as Woodsman / Twin A

== Content ==
The presentation opens with Cage and Dern engaging in a telephone conversation, the gist of which is that he is breaking up with her, to her great sorrow. Though they are never named as such, the two characters bear a striking resemblance to Sailor and Lula from Lynch's movie Wild at Heart. The rest of the play is a hallucinatory "dream" that the Heartbroken Woman has.

The show takes place on a stage, the main props being a tall metal girder-like structure, and an abandoned shell of a car, with flickering lights and cacophonous sounds used to create disturbing, nightmarish effects. Much use is made of actors suspended from ropes, flying and falling, as well as dancers.

== Music ==
Julee Cruise sings on tracks 1, 2, 4, 8 and 10. These songs are all from her 1989 debut album, Floating into the Night, apart from track 1, which is from her 1993 album, The Voice of Love. They are the normal, studio recordings; the songs are mimed. Her voice can also be heard in track 6, and she gets pushed into the trunk of the car. In track 8, the trunk opens and she sings from it, her face superimposed on a TV screen. Two of Julee's recordings, "Rockin' Back Inside My Heart" and "The World Spins," were also featured in episode 14 of the second season of Twin Peaks (for which Cruise recorded a vocal version of the theme). Another song from this performance, the instrumental "I'm Hurt Bad," is played on the diner's jukebox in the Twin Peaks pilot. "The World Spins" is also performed by Cruise in episode 17 of Twin Peaks: The Return.

Michael J. Anderson (known for his role as the small, dancing Man From Another Place on Twin Peaks) is featured on track 3, patiently sawing a log of wood to Badalamenti's discordant music. He is also part of the stage ensemble on track 5 (instrumental), along with a tall, demonic reindeer-like figure. Finally, on track 7, he reiterates the opening dialogue between Cage and Dern, accompanied by a clarinet player and a non-speaking actress playing Dern's part.

Track 9 is wholly instrumental, with a background of dolls being lowered from the roof on strings.

== Track list ==
1. "Up in Flames"
2. "I Float Alone"
3. "The Black Sea"
4. "Into the Night"
5. "I'm Hurt Bad"
6. "Pinky's Bubble Egg (The Twins Spoke)"
7. "The Dream Conversation"
8. "Rockin' Back Inside My Heart"
9. "The Final Battle"
10. "The World Spins"

== Home media ==
The show was released on VHS in 1990, on LaserDisc in 1991, and on DVD on November 18, 2008, as part of the David Lynch: The Lime Green Set collection, which featured the performance in both full-frame and widescreen versions. The widescreen version has less visual information due to the top and bottom of the footage being cut off so that it fills up the entire screen of a widescreen TV.
