= Rockin' Back Inside My Heart =

Single by Julee Cruise

from the album Floating into the Night
- Released: 1990
- Length: 4:04
- Label: Warner Bros.
- Composer: Angelo Badalamenti
- Lyricist: David Lynch
- Producers: David Lynch; Angelo Badalamenti

Julee Cruise singles chronology
"Falling" (1990)	"Rockin' Back Inside My Heart" (1990)

"Rockin' Back Inside My Heart" is a song by American singer, songwriter and actress Julee Cruise, released in 1990 by Warner Bros. Records as the second single from her debut album, Floating into the Night (1989). It was both written and produced by Angelo Badalamenti and David Lynch. Cruise performs the song in episode 14 of American television series Twin Peaks, the long-anticipated episode of the show in which the killer of Laura Palmer was finally revealed after a year of anxious, media-driven anticipation. Cruise also sings "Rockin' Back Inside My Heart" in Industrial Symphony No. 1, another David Lynch project.

== Content ==
The song is in the dream pop genre, with jazzy flourishes. Angelo Badalamenti composed the music and David Lynch wrote the lyrics.

== Critical reception ==
Andrew Mueller from Melody Maker named "Rockin' Back Inside My Heart" Single of the Week, adding, "So she's runner-up this time. This languid sub-doo-wop finger-clicker is nary a patch on the magisterial 'Falling', but it is nonetheless floating-away gorgeous and punctuated by a relatively wild saxophone blat in the middle and Julee's voice is still like drowning in a velvet-lined bath full of honey and pineapple jelly. You get the idea." Terry Staunton from NME wrote, "Fingers crossed, Julee Cruise will still be knocking about years after Twin Peaks has been consigned to the studio vaults. This is probably the most immediate and commercial track on the Floating into the Night LP, a Connie Francis love ballad punctuated by a Roxy Music sax solo. Whether Cruise sticks with David Lynch and Angelo Badalamenti in the future remains to be seen, although I'd like to hear the Pet Shop Boys knock out a few tunes for her."

== Track listing ==
- UK 7-inch
1. "Rockin' Back Inside My Heart" (Edit) – 4:06
2. "Falling" (LP version) – 5:45
- UK 12-inch and CD
1. "Rockin' Back Inside My Heart" (Tibetan Mix) – 5:40
2. "Rockin' Back Inside My Heart" (Edit) – 4:06
3. "Mysteries of Love" – 4:27
- US 12-inch
1. "Rockin' Back Inside My Heart" (Tibetan 12" Mix) – 5:43
2. "Rockin' Back Inside My Heart" (Bonus Beats) – 2:30
3. "Rockin' Back Inside My Heart" (A Cappella) – 5:05
4. "Rockin' Back Inside My Heart" (Tibetan Dub) – 5:45
5. "The World Spins" – 6:38
6. "Rockin' Back Inside My Heart" (Original Single Edit) – 4:04
- US CD
1. "Rockin' Back Inside My Heart" (Tibetan Single Mix) – 3:49
2. "Rockin' Back Inside My Heart" (Tibetan 12" Mix) – 5:43
3. "The World Spins" – 6:38
4. "Rockin' Back Inside My Heart" (Original Single Edit) – 4:04

== Charts ==
Chart performance for "Rockin' Back Inside My Heart"
Chart (1990)	Peak position
Australia (ARIA)	107
Ireland (IRMA)	18
UK Singles (OCC)	66
UK Airplay (Music Week)	45
