= Falling (Julee Cruise song) =

1990 single by Julee Cruise

Single by Julee Cruise

from the album Floating into the Night
- B-side: "Theme from Twin Peaks" (instrumental); "Floating"
- Released: 1990
- Studio: Excalibur Sound Productions (New York City)
- Genre: Dream pop; ambient pop
- Length: 4:12 (radio edit); 5:21 (album version)
- Label: Warner Bros. (US, UK); WEA International (Germany)
- Composer: Angelo Badalamenti
- Lyricist: David Lynch
- Producers: Angelo Badalamenti; David Lynch

Julee Cruise singles chronology
"Falling" (1990)	"Rockin' Back Inside My Heart" (1991)

Music video
- "Falling" on YouTube

"Falling" is a song by American dream pop singer Julee Cruise. It is the lead single and second track from her debut studio album, Floating into the Night (1989). Featuring music composed by Angelo Badalamenti and lyrics written by David Lynch, an instrumental version of "Falling" was used as the theme song for Lynch and Mark Frost's surrealist mystery-horror drama television series Twin Peaks (1990–1991) and its 2017 revival.

Twin Peaks gained a cult following after its original broadcast in April 1990, and "Falling" subsequently charted in 17 countries worldwide between 1990 and 1992, including Australia, where it reached No. 1 in April 1991. Badalamenti won Best Pop Instrumental Performance at the 33rd Annual Grammy Awards for "Twin Peaks Theme". In 2010, Pitchfork Media ranked "Falling" at number 146 on its "Top 200 Tracks of the 1990s". NME listed the song at number 38 in their ranking of "100 Best Songs of the 1990s" in 2012.

== Composition ==
According to composer Angelo Badalamenti the characteristic sound of the song was made by playing a tuned-down electric guitar.

In the ruckus of beers flying through the air at The Roadhouse, we have Julee singing a beautiful, slow-tempo song, and it's so outrageous. You would never have that kind of song in a place like that. [...] The songs with Julee serve a two-fold purpose: They contrast the visuals and they set the tone for the show.

— Angelo Badalamenti

== Critical reception ==
Ned Raggett from AllMusic complimented the song as "a winner". Bill Coleman from Billboard magazine described it as a "modern rock staple", propelled by the hit television series Twin Peaks. He noted that the track "succeeds in creating its own surreal yet comforting environment." Andrew Mueller from Melody Maker named it Single of the Week, declaring it as "lilting and lovely and should make you want to weep diamonds. It's one of those ones that creates a huge presence by only just being there". Pan-European magazine Music & Media stated, "Anyone who is familiar with the Twin Peaks series is sure to have shivers listening to the theme tune. An ambient and dreamy song; although atmospheric, it is at the same time very down-to-earth, and threatening in its cold-blooded beauty."

Nick Robinson from Music Week commented, "Every now and again a truly beautiful single comes along transfixing everyone that hears it." He added, "The sparse haunting instrumentation combines with Cruise's dreamy vocals to produce a stunning piece of music." Diane Tameecha from The Network Forty wrote that "the hypnotic blend of the track's music and Cruise's aforementioned downy singing style is an unbeatable combination." Roger Morton from NME felt the combination of Cruise's "spooky soprano" and the "sickly gliding instrumentation" make for "a charmingly Lynch-ean candy slug of a record." Bill Henderson from Orlando Sentinel explained, "When she sings about 'falling, falling, falling in love' to the tune of the Twin Peaks theme, you can almost see her descending to Earth in slow motion."

== Retrospective response ==
In 2012, NME featured the song in their ranking of "100 Best Songs of the 1990s", describing it as "an eerie 50s-flecked ballad". Tom Ewing for Pitchfork said that "it's not just that 'Falling' is unshakably evocative of a great show, it's that the show was great because at its best it lived up to the mystery and romance Julee Cruise's frost-delicate voice promised." In 2012, Porcys ranked the song No. 95 on their ranking of the "100 Singles 1990–1999", describing it as "hauntologia par excellence."

== Music video ==
A music video was produced for "Falling", featuring Julee Cruise performing the song through soft curtains and dramatic red lighting. It fades to various scenes from the Twin Peaks television series. The version used in the video is an edited cut of the song.

== Track listings ==
- UK 7-inch and US cassette
1. "Falling" (edit) – 4:12
2. "Theme from Twin Peaks" (instrumental) – 4:45
- UK 12-inch and European CD
1. "Falling" (edit) – 4:12
2. "Theme from Twin Peaks" (instrumental) – 4:45
3. "Floating" – 4:55

== Charts ==
=== Weekly charts ===
Julee Cruise version

Chart (1990–1992)	Peak position
Australia (ARIA)	1
Austria (Ö3 Austria Top 40)	14
Belgium (Ultratop 50 Flanders)	14
Canada Adult Contemporary (RPM)	32
Denmark (IFPI)	8
Europe (Eurochart Hot 100)	26
Finland (Suomen virallinen lista)	2
Germany (GfK)	17
Ireland (IRMA)	5
Israel (Israeli Singles Chart)	18
Italy (Musica e dischi)	3
Luxembourg (Radio Luxembourg)	5
Netherlands (Dutch Top 40)	16
Netherlands (Single Top 100)	17
New Zealand (Recorded Music NZ)	33
Norway (VG-lista)	3
Sweden (Sverigetopplistan)	2
Switzerland (Schweizer Hitparade)	25
UK Singles (Official Charts)	7
US Modern Rock Tracks (Billboard)	11

One-Eyed Jacks version

Chart (1991)	Peak position
Denmark (IFPI)	2

=== Year-end charts ===
Julee Cruise version

Chart (1991)	Position
Australia (ARIA)	30
Belgium (Ultratop)	60
Europe (Eurochart Hot 100)	97
Netherlands (Dutch Top 40)	85
Netherlands (Single Top 100)	70
Sweden (Topplistan)	15

== Certifications ==
Region	Certification	Certified units/sales
Australia (ARIA)	Gold	35,000^{^}
Sweden (GLF)	Gold	25,000^{^}
^{^} Shipments figures based on certification alone.

== Other versions and covers ==
A demo version by Cruise (5:56 in length) was released in 1994 as No. 15 in Warner Bros./Reprise Records' Soil X Samples promotional singles series, which ran from 1990 to 1997. The green vinyl 7" was a split single, "Falling" backed with "Syria" by Not Drowning, Waving. Cruise also recorded a new version of the song and released it as a hidden track on her 2002 album The Art of Being a Girl.

"Falling" has been covered by a number of artists since its original release. In 1990, the German house band The Mob released a four-track single entitled "Theme from Twin Peaks", which included three original mixes of "Falling". Danish radio DJ Kjeld Tolstrup released an EP of three dance renditions of the song — "The Log Lady Mix", "The Ronnette Pulaski Mix" and "The Log Lady Mix Short Version" in 1991, under the pseudonym One-Eyed Jacks, the name of the casino/brothel in Twin Peaks. English band the Wedding Present recorded a version of "Falling" that was released on their 1992 single "Silver Shorts" and included on the band's compilation album Hit Parade 1 (1992). The Apoptygma Berzerk song "Moment of Tranquility", from the 2000 album Welcome to Earth, is based on the Twin Peaks theme song, with different lyrics. French countertenor Thomas Otten recorded a version of "Falling" on his 2003 album Portraits, using samples from the original recording.

In 2010, a cover of "Falling" by Girls Names, a noise pop band from Northern Ireland, appeared on a 15-track sampler, Young & Research. Also in 2010, Bright Light Bright Light, the pseudonym of Welsh electropop singer Rod Thomas, released a cover of "Falling" online for free. A corresponding music video was recorded in Snoqualmie, Washington—where the Twin Peaks pilot episode was shot—and featured scenes at several locations from the series. Dream pop band Field Mouse included the song on an EP released in 2012. American folktronica duo The Endless included instrumental and vocal renditions of "Falling" as well as other songs from Twin Peaks on their EP Holiday 2012, proceeds from which were donated to Médecins Sans Frontières, a humanitarian aid charity. In October 2013, Gavin Castleton and Lex Land posted a version to YouTube and SoundCloud. The Joy Formidable released a cover of Badalamenti's instrumental as "Twin Peaks" in 2015. In February 2016, Lily Fawn and Eric Hogg, recording as Songs from the Black Lodge, released a seven-song EP containing six Twin Peaks covers and one original tune. On April 16, 2016, Record Store Day, experimental rock band Xiu Xiu released Plays the Music of Twin Peaks, a tribute to Badalamenti's original soundtrack, featuring a seven-minute rendition of "Falling".

Chrystabell (who plays Agent Tammy Preston in Twin Peaks season 3) released a cover version of the song in 2017. The electronic music group Above & Beyond and singer Zoë Johnston also released a cover of the song in 2020.
