= Michael J. Anderson =

American actor (born 1953)

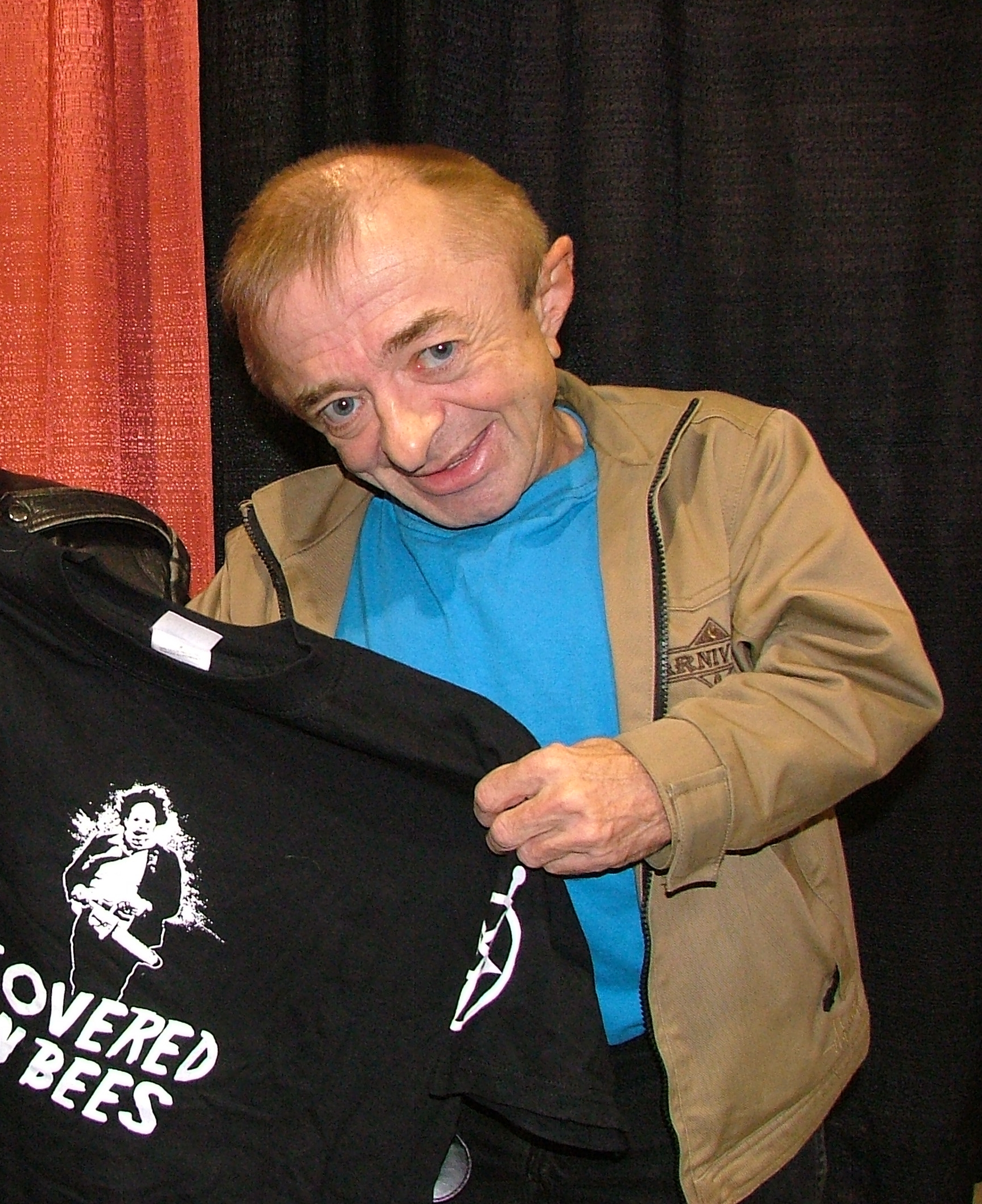
- Anderson in 2006
- Born: October 31, 1953 (age 72); Denver, Colorado, U.S.
- Occupation: Actor
- Years active: 1968–2013
- Known for: Twin Peaks; Carnivàle
- Height: 3 ft 7 in (109 cm)

Michael J. Anderson (born October 31, 1953) is a retired American actor. He is best known for his role as The Man from Another Place in David Lynch's television series Twin Peaks and the prequel film Twin Peaks: Fire Walk with Me. He is also known for playing Samson on the HBO series Carnivàle.

== Early life and career ==
Anderson has the genetic disorder osteogenesis imperfecta, a disease that leads to frequent breaks in long bones and improper healing, leaving him with a height of 3 feet 7 inches (1.09 m).

Before his acting career, Anderson worked as a computer technician for Martin Marietta. He was part of the ground support system for NASA's Space Shuttle. He appeared as himself in the 1984 documentary Little Mike: A Videoportrait of Michael Anderson. He also appeared in the 1985 promo video for Yoko Ono's song "Hell in Paradise".

== Acting career ==
Anderson's first acting role was in the series Monsters, appearing in two episodes in 1988 and 1990.

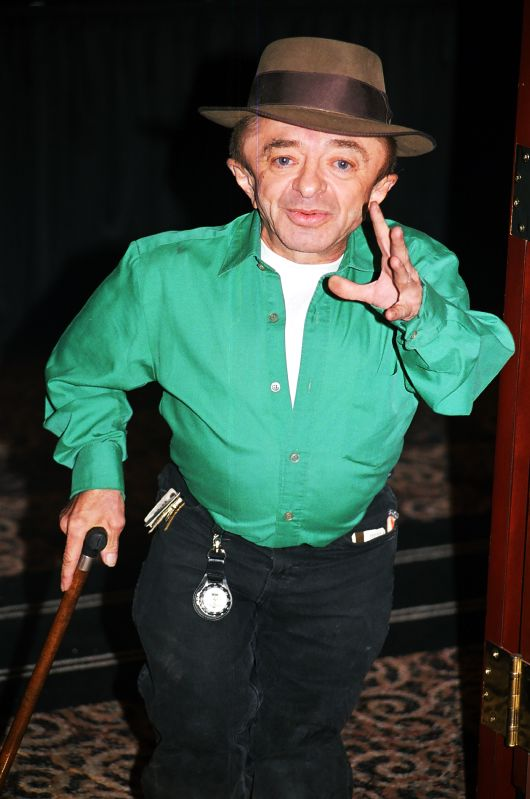
Anderson at CarneyCon, 2006

Anderson appeared as The Man from Another Place in four episodes of David Lynch's television series Twin Peaks, attired in a red suit and speaking in an unusual manner.

Anderson had used phonetically reversed speaking as a secret language with his junior high school friends, and the same method was used in the series. Anderson would speak into a recorder. This was then played in reverse, and Anderson was directed to repeat the reversed original. This "reverse-speech" was then reversed again in editing to bring it back to the normal direction. This phonetic reversal created the strange cadences, rhythms, and accentuation that set Cooper's dreamworld apart from the real world. Lynch was unaware of Anderson's familiarity with the phonetic reversal method when he cast Anderson, and had hired a trainer to help with enunciation. When he found out Anderson could already talk backward, he canceled the trainer and wrote more difficult lines of dialogue for Anderson.

Anderson's character first appears in Special Agent Dale Cooper's cryptic dream about the murder of Laura Palmer, set in a red room. Anderson also appeared as the Man from Another Place in Twin Peaks: Fire Walk with Me, the prequel film to Twin Peaks.

Anderson portrayed Rumpelstiltskin in the 1993 Star Trek: Deep Space Nine episode "If Wishes Were Horses" and appeared two years later in The X-Files episode "Humbug". He portrayed a man of average height in Lynch's 2001 film Mulholland Drive, using a prosthetic body. From 2003 to 2005, Anderson was a cast member of the TV series Carnivàle. Other television and film roles include Honey, I Shrunk the Kids: The TV Show, Charmed, Cold Case, and Adventure Time. Anderson retired from acting in 2014. His last role was in Scooby-Doo! Mystery Incorporated.

== Controversies ==
In 2015, Anderson was asked to reprise his role as The Man from Another Place for Twin Peaks' third season but declined over compensation. The character instead appears as a talking, CGI-created luminescent tree that is introduced as "the evolution of the arm" and voiced by an uncredited actor. When asked who provided the voice, executive producer Sabrina Sutherland replied, "Unfortunately, I think this question should remain a mystery and not be answered."

== Filmography ==
=== Television ===
Year	Show	Role	Notes
1988–1990	Monsters	Holly; Household God	Episodes: "Holly's House"; "Household Gods"
1990–1991	Twin Peaks	The Man from Another Place	4 episodes
1992	Picket Fences	Peeter Dreeb	Episode "Mr. Dreeb Comes to Town"
1993	Star Trek: Deep Space Nine	Rumpelstiltskin	Episode "If Wishes Were Horses"
1994	Cyberkidz	Doctor Fubbles, Iggy	Credited as "Bart Williams"
1995	The X-Files	Mr. Nutt	Episode "Humbug"
1996	Night Stand with Dick Dietrick	Jimmy	Episode "Staff Talent Show". Credited as "Michael Anderson"
1998	Maggie		Episode "Ka-Boom"
1998	Honey, I Shrunk the Kids: The TV Show	Omar	Episode "Honey, I've Joined the Bigtop"
1999	The Phantom Eye	Doll Man/Carl	
1999	Port Charles	Peter Zorin	
2000	This is How the World Ends	Customer	Cameo in unaired Gregg Araki MTV pilot
2001	Black Scorpion		Episode "Crime Time"
2001	Snow White: The Fairest of Them All	Sunday (Violet)	
2003–2005	Carnivàle	Samson	24 episodes
2006	Charmed	O'Brian the Leprechaun	2 episodes
2010	Cold Case	Nathaniel "Biggie" Jones	Episode "Metamorphosis"
2011	Adventure Time	Gummy (voice)	Episode "The Silent King"
2012	Transactions	Appeared with Jerry Seinfeld in a commercial for Acura ("Last Living Munchkin")	Aired during the 2012 Super Bowl.
2014	Scooby-Doo! Mystery Incorporated	Dancing Man (voice) and as Professor Horatio Kharon (voice)	Episodes "Stand and Deliver", "Nightmare In Red"

=== Film ===
Year	Film	Role
1983	Buddies	Thai Buyer
1984	Little Mike: A Videoportrait of Michael Anderson	Himself
1987	The Great Land of Small	Fritz/The King
1989	Suffering Bastards	Little Elvis
1989	No Such Thing as Gravity	Botanist
1990	Whatever Happened to Mason Reese	Sushi Chef
1990	Industrial Symphony No. 1: The Dream of the Broken Hearted	Lightman
1991	Mannequin Two: On the Move	Jewel Box Bearer
1992	In the Soup	Little Man
1992	Fool's Fire	Hop-Frog
1992	Twin Peaks: Fire Walk with Me	The Man from Another Place
1993	Night Trap	Police Officer
1994	Murder too Sweet	Harry the Huckster
1995	Caged Hearts	John
1996	Street Gun	Lamar
1997	Warriors of Virtue	Mudlap
1998	Club Vampire	Kiddo
1999	Minimum Wage	Zeke Bleak
2001	Mulholland Drive	Mr. Roque
2001	Snow White: The Fairest of Them All	Sunday
2003	Sticky Fingers	Irate Man
2003	Tiptoes	Bruno
2004	Big Time	Henri Blunderbore

=== Video games ===
Year	Game	Role
1994	Loadstar: The Legend of Tully Bodine	Bartender
2000	Road Rash: Jailbreak	Punt

== Music appearances ==
- (1985) "Hell in Paradise," music promo video by Yoko Ono
- (1989) "Turtle Song", music promo video by alternative band Hugo Largo
- (2000) Lodge Anathema (with The Nether-Carols)
