= Soundtrack from Twin Peaks =

Album by Angelo Badalamenti

Soundtrack album by Angelo Badalamenti
- Released: September 11, 1990
- Recorded: 1989–1990
- Studios: Excalibur Sound, New York City
- Genres: Jazz; ambient; dream pop
- Length: 49:47
- Label: Warner Bros.
- Producers: Angelo Badalamenti; David Lynch

Angelo Badalamenti chronology
Soundtrack from Twin Peaks (1990)	Twin Peaks: Fire Walk with Me (1992)

Singles from Soundtrack from Twin Peaks
- 1. "Falling" Released: 1990

Professional ratings
Review scores
Source	Rating
AllMusic	4.5/5 stars
NME	9/10
Pitchfork	9.0/10
Q	4/5 stars
Record Mirror	4 1/2/5
The Rolling Stone Album Guide	2/5 stars
Select	4/5
Uncut	9/10

Soundtrack from Twin Peaks (also known as Music from Twin Peaks) is a soundtrack album by American composer Angelo Badalamenti. It was released on September 11, 1990, by Warner Bros. Records and is the official soundtrack to the television series Twin Peaks (1990–1991). Though mostly instrumental, three tracks feature vocals by Julee Cruise.

== Background ==
The series' co-creator David Lynch produced the album alongside Badalamenti and wrote lyrics for several tracks, including the series' theme song "Falling".

Upon its release, Soundtrack from Twin Peaks placed in several international charts—including the top 10 in Norway, Sweden, Australia and the Netherlands—and "Twin Peaks Theme" received the award for Best Pop Instrumental Performance at 33rd Annual Grammy Awards.

Several tracks of the soundtrack were sampled numerous times, a famous example is "Laura Palmer's Theme", which was sampled in the "Woodtick Mix" of the song "Go" by Moby.

== Track listing ==
All lyrics are written by David Lynch; all music is composed by Angelo Badalamenti.

No.	Title	Length
1.	"Twin Peaks Theme" (instrumental)	5:10
2.	"Laura Palmer's Theme" (instrumental)	4:52
3.	"Audrey's Dance" (instrumental)	5:17
4.	"The Nightingale" (vocals by Julee Cruise)	4:56
5.	"Freshly Squeezed" (instrumental)	3:48
6.	"The Bookhouse Boys" (instrumental)	3:29
7.	"Into the Night" (vocals by Julee Cruise)	4:44
8.	"Night Life in Twin Peaks" (instrumental)	3:27
9.	"Dance of the Dream Man" (instrumental)	3:41
10.	"Love Theme from Twin Peaks" (instrumental)	5:04
11.	"Falling" (vocals by Julee Cruise)	5:21
Total length:		49:47

== Personnel ==
Credits adapted from the liner notes of Soundtrack from Twin Peaks.

Musicians

- Angelo Badalamenti – piano, synthesizer, orchestration, arrangement, production
- Julee Cruise – vocals (4, 7, 11)
- Vinnie Bell – electric guitar
- Eddie Daniels – flute, clarinet
- Eddie Dixon – electric guitar
- Kinny Landrum – synthesizer
- Albert Regni – tenor saxophone, clarinet, flute
- Grady Tate – drums

Technical

- David Lynch – production, photography
- Art Pohlemus – recording, mixing (1–3, 5, 6, 8–10)
- Jay Healy – mixing (4, 7, 11)
- Howie Weinberg – mastering

Design

- Tom Recchion – art direction, design
- Kevin Laffey - coordination, A&R
- Fredrik Nilsen – photography
- Paula K. Shimatsu-U – photography
- Marc Sirinsky – photography
- Craig Sjodin – photography
- Kimberly Wright – photography

== Charts ==
=== Weekly charts ===
Weekly chart performance for Soundtrack from Twin Peaks
Chart (1990–1991)	Peak position
Australian Albums (ARIA)	1
Austrian Albums (Ö3 Austria)	14
Canada Top Albums/CDs (RPM)	18
Danish Albums (Hitlisten)	4
Dutch Albums (Album Top 100)	5
European Albums (Music & Media)	11
Finnish Albums (Suomen virallinen lista)	2
German Albums (Offizielle Top 100)	17
Greek Albums (IFPI)	10
Hungarian Albums (MAHASZ)	4
Italian Albums (Musica e dischi)	3
New Zealand Albums (RMNZ)	13
Norwegian Albums (VG-lista)	2
Portuguese Albums (UNEVA)	2
Spanish Albums (AFYVE)	3
Swedish Albums (Sverigetopplistan)	2
UK Albums (Official Charts)	27
US Billboard 200	22
US New Age Albums (Billboard)	16

Chart (2026)	Peak position
Greek Albums (IFPI)	59

=== Year-end charts ===
1990 year-end chart performance for Soundtrack from Twin Peaks
Chart (1990)	Position
Canada Top Albums/CDs (RPM)	82

1991 year-end chart performance for Soundtrack from Twin Peaks
Chart (1991)	Position
Australian Albums (ARIA)	15
Dutch Albums (Album Top 100)	41
European Albums (Music & Media)	39

== Certifications ==
Certifications for Soundtrack from Twin Peaks
Region	Certification	Certified units/sales
Australia (ARIA)	Platinum	70,000^{^}
Canada (Music Canada)	Gold	50,000^{^}
Finland (Musiikkituottajat)	Gold	28,316
France (SNEP)	Gold	100,000^{*}
Netherlands (NVPI)	Gold	50,000^{^}
Spain (Promusicae)	Platinum	100,000^{^}
Sweden (GLF)	Gold	50,000^{^}
United Kingdom (BPI)	Gold	100,000^{^}
United States (RIAA)	Gold	500,000^{^}
^{*} Sales figures based on certification alone.^{^} Shipments figures based on certification alone.
