= Field Mouse (band) =

American dream pop band

Field Mouse are an American dream pop band from Philadelphia, Pennsylvania and Brooklyn, New York.

== History ==
Field Mouse began in 2010 with the release of their first full-length album titled You Are Here. In 2012, Field Mouse released a two-song EP titled You Guys Are Gonna Wake Up My Mom. On October 16, 2012, Field Mouse released a 7" titled How Do You Know via Lefse Records.

In early 2013, Field Mouse self-released an EP titled Tour EP. In April 2014, Field Mouse announced they had signed to Topshelf Records, with plans to release a full-length in the future. Three months later, Field Mouse released their second full-length album titled Hold Still Life on Topshelf Records. In August 2016, they released their second album, entitled Episodic.

== Band members ==
- Rachel Browne (vocals, guitar)
- Andrew Futral (guitar)
- Saysha Heinzman (bass)
- Tim McCoy (drums)
- Zoë Browne (synthesizer, guitar)

== Discography ==
Studio albums

- You Are Here (2010, self-released)
- Hold Still Life (2014, Topshelf)
- Episodic (2016, Topshelf)
- Meaning (2019, Topshelf)

EPs

- You Guys Are Gonna Wake Up My Mom (2012, Small Plates)
- How Do You Know (2012, Lefse)
- Tour EP (2013, self-released)

Compilations

- Topshelf Records 2014 Tour - A Great Big Pile of Leaves, Diamond Youth, Prawn, Field Mouse
