= Floating into the Night =

Studio album by Julee Cruise
- Released: September 12, 1989
- Studio: Excalibur Sound (New York City)
- Genres: Dream pop; jazz; lounge
- Length: 47:56
- Label: Warner Bros.
- Producers: David Lynch; Angelo Badalamenti

Julee Cruise chronology
Floating into the Night (1989)	The Voice of Love (1993)

Singles from Floating into the Night
- 1. "Falling" Released: October 22, 1990; 2. "Rockin' Back Inside My Heart" Released: March 18, 1991

Floating into the Night is the debut studio album by American singer Julee Cruise. It was released on September 12, 1989, by Warner Bros. Records, and features compositions and production by Angelo Badalamenti and film director David Lynch. Songs from the album were featured in Lynch's projects Blue Velvet (1986), Industrial Symphony No. 1 (1990), and Twin Peaks (1990–1991).

The album peaked at number 74 on the US Billboard 200 following the success of the Twin Peaks TV series in 1990. Lead single "Falling" reached the top 10 of the UK Singles Chart, peaking at number seven and spending 12 weeks in total on the chart.

== Background ==
Filmmaker David Lynch and composer Angelo Badalamenti's collaboration with Cruise first came about during the scoring process for Lynch's 1986 film Blue Velvet, in which a key scene was intended to feature This Mortal Coil's cover version of "Song to the Siren" by Tim Buckley. With the rights to the song proving prohibitively expensive, it was suggested that Badalamenti compose a song in the same style and recruit a vocalist with a haunting, ethereal voice akin to that of Elizabeth Fraser. Badalamenti recommended Cruise, who had sung in a New York theater workshop he had produced. The result was the track "Mysteries of Love". Lynch and Badalamenti were impressed with the track, and elected to record more with Cruise.

== Composition ==
Floating into the Night was produced and written by Badalamenti and Lynch; Badalamenti composed the music and Lynch wrote the lyrics. Cruise initially regarded herself as "a Broadway belter" and had a reputation for letting "angry and aggressive emotions power her work," but Lynch "felt that Cruise had a 'soft, sad side'" and encouraged her to sing in a softer tone and in a higher register; Cruise's vocal style on Floating into the Night has been often regarded as "ethereal" and drawn comparisons to Elizabeth Fraser on the earlier releases by Cocteau Twins. Cruise's vocals on Floating into the Night feature heavy use of digital reverb. Early recording sessions were difficult until Cruise heard her vocals treated with effects, upon which she recognized that Badalamenti was creating "mood pieces", and also took to Lynch's lyrics. Nonetheless, she expressed concern about the album's sound, stating that:

I wasn't quite sure how the hell we were going to pull it off. One night I played some demos for my husband's friend and his wife, and she said, "white wine Muzak." Aaaahh! I took it home for Christmas — and everyone in my family hated it. They were like, "What are you singing about?" One of my lawyers at the time said, "This is a novelty." I said, "Like Tiny Tim?"

According to Lynch, forty songs were written for the album in total, with the final track listing including ten. Badalamenti noted that "when [the album] came out, radio stations said they had no slots for it. Is it pop? Not really. Is it R&B? Certainly not. What is it? Even the more avant-garde stations found it unusual, so it was difficult getting airplay." Floating into the Night has been characterized as a dream pop album, with heavy elements of jazz and traditional jazz instrumentation; Rolling Stone considered Floating into the Night as a definitive development of the dream pop sound, describing how the album "added depth to [the genre]" and "gave the genre its synthy sheen", particularly on the track "Mysteries of Love". In the 1998 book MusicHound Lounge: The Essential Album Guide, writer Jack Jackson wrote "The tunes...fill a 'trip-lounge' void between traditional and non-traditional genres."

== Release ==
Floating into the Night was released on September 12, 1989 on Warner Bros. Records, although the album was originally set for release in late April. It was originally issued on CD, LP and cassette. Two singles were released from the album: "Falling" and "Rockin' Back Inside My Heart". Floating into the Night has since been reissued on several occasions. The album received a CD reissue in Europe in October 1998, a 180-gram LP repressing by Plain Recordings in the United States in October 2014 and a separate 180-gram LP repressing by Music on Vinyl in Europe in February 2015.

Tracks from Floating into the Night were used in other projects by Lynch. "Mysteries of Love" had been previously featured in Blue Velvet. "Rockin' Back Inside My Heart", "Into the Night", "I Float Alone" and "The World Spins" were performed in the 1990 Lynch production Industrial Symphony No. 1. "Falling", "Rockin' Back Inside My Heart", "Into the Night", "The Nightingale" and "The World Spins" appeared in Twin Peaks, a television series co-created by Lynch. Lynch's lyrics on the album have been the subject of analysis from fans and academic studies of the series. In The Cinema of David Lynch: American Dreams, Nightmare Visions, academic John Richardson said that Cruise's considerable use of reverb makes her sound as if she sings "from a distance that clearly parallels the distance between the other world that [Twin Peaks character] Laura Palmer has fallen into and the primary diegetic world of the other characters"; he considered the lyrics to "Falling"—an instrumental version of which was used as the theme song to the series—as "reinforc[ing] this impression since they can easily be understood as representing Laura's point of view". Cruise, however, considers Lynch's lyrics to have been written about his then-partner, Italian actress and model Isabella Rossellini.

"The World Spins" was featured on the soundtrack to the 2003 film The Company.

== Reception and legacy ==
=== Critical response ===
Professional ratings
Review scores
Source	Rating
AllMusic	5/5 stars
The Boston Phoenix	3.5/4 stars
Chicago Sun-Times	3/4 stars
NME	8/10
Orlando Sentinel	5/5 stars
Pitchfork	9.0/10
Q	4/5 stars
Record Mirror	5/5
The Rolling Stone Album Guide	2/5 stars
The Village Voice	B−

Floating into the Night has received widespread critical acclaim. Stuart Bailie of NME praised it as "an immense study of wonderment and near-perfection." In a short feature article in Spin, Scott Cohen likened the album to "a dark movie with no film footage, just a haunting voice, bizarre dialogue and vivid atmospherics", and described Cruise's vocals as "scary and beautiful". Q included Floating into the Night in its year-end list of the "50 Best Albums of 1990". However, the album garnered a mixed review from The Village Voice editor Robert Christgau, who said that "when admirers claim [Cruise] sounds best in a dark room at three in the morning, I wonder whether she puts them to sleep too." In the 1992 Rolling Stone Album Guide, J. D. Considine wrote that "Cruise comes across as a sort of post-modern Claudine Longet—an amusing concept, to be sure, but hardly worth an entire album."

In a retrospective review for AllMusic, Ned Raggett referred to Floating into the Night as "more or less [the] unofficial soundtrack [to] Twin Peaks" and added that "the combination of Cruise's sweet, light tones, Lynch's surprisingly affecting lyrics … and Angelo Badalamenti's combination of retro styles and modern ambience, is a winner throughout. The feeling is one of a 50s jukebox suddenly plunged into a time warp, dressed with extra sparkle and with a just-sleepy-enough, narcotic feeling." Pitchfork critic Sam Sodomsky called the album "one of dream pop's chief benchmarks", while also noting that it "captured something important about dreams that plenty of other artists in the genre have ignored ... Cruise and her collaborators also had the ability to shake you awake, to twist an image that should be pretty into something broken and grotesque." In 2010 Pitchfork included "Falling" at number 146 on its staff list of "The Top 200 Tracks of the 1990s"; Tom Ewing said that "[the song] catches you with its dreamy, echo-drenched gentility—like Les Paul and Mary Ford inventing shoegaze in 1961—and inside is one of the decade's simplest and warmest love songs." Floating into the Night was ranked at number 24 on Fact's 2013 list of "The 100 Best Albums of the 1980s", and at number 67 on Pitchfork's 2018 list of "The 200 Best Albums of the 1980s".

=== Commercial performance ===
Following the breakout success of Twin Peaks, Floating into the Night peaked at number 74 on the US Billboard 200 on June 30, 1990, nine months after its release. In Canada, the album peaked at number 27 for two weeks in August 1990, and returned four weeks later for two weeks at number 29. In total, it was on the Canadian charts for 30 weeks. In 1991 the album placed on several international album charts, peaking at number 21 on the Australian Albums Chart number 11 on the New Zealand Albums Chart and number 36 on the Swedish Albums Chart.

Despite not placing on the UK Albums Chart, Floating into the Night's lead single "Falling" reached the top 10 of the UK Singles Chart, peaking at number seven and spending 12 weeks in total on the chart; "Falling" was also a moderate commercial success in several international territories, peaking in the top 10 of singles charts in Ireland, Norway and Sweden, and reaching the number one spot in Australia. In February 2012, Floating into the Night was certified Silver by the British Phonographic Industry (BPI), denoting shipments in excess of 60,000 units in the United Kingdom.

== Track listing ==
All lyrics are written by David Lynch; all music is composed by Angelo Badalamenti.

No.	Title	Length
1.	"Floating"	4:51
2.	"Falling"	5:25
3.	"I Remember"	4:11
4.	"Rockin' Back Inside My Heart"	5:45
5.	"Mysteries of Love"	4:27
6.	"Into the Night"	4:42
7.	"I Float Alone"	4:33
8.	"The Nightingale"	4:54
9.	"The Swan"	2:28
10.	"The World Spins"	6:38
Total length:		47:56

== Personnel ==
All personnel credits adapted from Floating into the Night's album notes.

Performers

- Julee Cruise – vocals
- Eddie Dixon – electric guitar
- Vinnie Bell – electric guitar
- Kenny Landrum – synthesizer
- Angelo Badalamenti – synthesizer, piano, arrangement, orchestration
- Al Regni – tenor saxophone, clarinet

Technical personnel

- David Lynch – production
- Angelo Badalamenti – production

Technical personnel (continued)

- Art Pohlemus – engineering, mixing (5)
- Jay Healy – mixing (1–4, 6–9)
- Mike Krowiak – mixing (10)
- Tim Leitner – mixing (10)
- Stephen Marcussen – mastering

Design personnel

- David Lynch – art direction, photography
- Tom Recchion – design

== Charts ==
Chart performance for Floating into the Night
Chart (1990–1991)	Peak position
Australian Albums (ARIA)	21
Canada Top Albums/CDs (RPM)	27
Finland (Suomen virallinen albumlista)	30
New Zealand Albums (RMNZ)	11
Swedish Albums (Sverigetopplistan)	36
US Billboard 200	74

== Certifications ==
Certifications for Floating into the Night
Region	Certification	Certified units/sales
United Kingdom (BPI)	Silver	60,000^{^}
^{^} Shipments figures based on certification alone.
