= Twin Peaks =

American drama television series (1990–91, 2017)

- Genre: Comedy-drama; Mystery; Horror; Surrealism; Fantasy
- Created by: Mark Frost; David Lynch
- Showrunners: Mark Frost; David Lynch; Harley Peyton (episodes 15–30); Robert Engels (episodes 15–30)
- Starring: Kyle MacLachlan; Michael Ontkean; Mädchen Amick; Dana Ashbrook; Richard Beymer; Lara Flynn Boyle; Sherilyn Fenn; Warren Frost; Peggy Lipton; James Marshall; Everett McGill; Jack Nance; Ray Wise; Joan Chen; Piper Laurie; Kimmy Robertson; Eric Da Re; Harry Goaz; Michael Horse; Sheryl Lee; Russ Tamblyn
- Opening theme: Instrumental version of "Falling" by Julee Cruise
- Composer: Angelo Badalamenti
- Country of origin: United States
- Original language: English
- No. of seasons: 3
- No. of episodes: 48 (list of episodes)

Production
- Executive producers: Mark Frost; David Lynch; Sabrina S. Sutherland (season 3)
- Cinematography: Ron Garcia ("Pilot"); Frank Byers (episodes 2–30); Peter Deming (season 3)
- Running time: 45–60 minutes; 94 minutes ("Pilot" and "May the Giant Be With You")
- Production companies: Lynch/Frost Productions; Propaganda Films; Spelling Television; Twin Peaks Productions; Showtime Networks (season 3); Rancho Rosa Partnership (season 3)
- Budget: >$41 million (season 3) (Note: This amount represents the total qualified expenditures for the California Film & Television Tax Credit and excludes other non-qualifying costs.)

Original release
- Network: ABC
- Release: April 8, 1990 – June 10, 1991
- Network: Showtime
- Release: May 21 – September 3, 2017

Related
- Twin Peaks: Fire Walk with Me (1992); Twin Peaks: The Missing Pieces (2014)

Twin Peaks is an American surrealist mystery-horror-drama television series created by David Lynch and Mark Frost. It premiered on ABC on April 8, 1990, and ran for two seasons until its cancellation in 1991. The show returned in 2017 for a third season on Showtime.

Set in the fictional Pacific Northwest town of Twin Peaks, the series follows an investigation led by FBI special agent Dale Cooper (Kyle MacLachlan) into the murder of local teenager Laura Palmer (Sheryl Lee). The show's narrative draws on the characteristics of detective fiction, but its uncanny tone, supernatural elements, and campy, melodramatic portrayal of eccentric characters also draw from American horror and soap opera tropes. Like much of Lynch's work, it is distinguished by surrealism, distinctive cinematography, and offbeat humor. The musical score was composed by Angelo Badalamenti with Lynch.

The original run was followed by the 1992 feature film Twin Peaks: Fire Walk with Me, which serves as a prequel to the series. The success created a media franchise, leading to the release of several tie-in books, starting with The Secret Diary of Laura Palmer. Under Lynch's direction, the show's 2017 revival included much of the original cast.

In the years following the first two seasons, the show gained a devoted cult following and was referenced in a wide variety of media, earning acclaim and various accolades including a Golden Globe Award and nominations for 27 Primetime Emmy Awards, winning two. Twin Peaks is considered a landmark turning point in television drama and often listed among the greatest television series of all time. The 2017 revival also received acclaim, and film journal Cahiers du Cinéma named it the best film of the 2010s.

== Plot ==
=== Season 1 ===
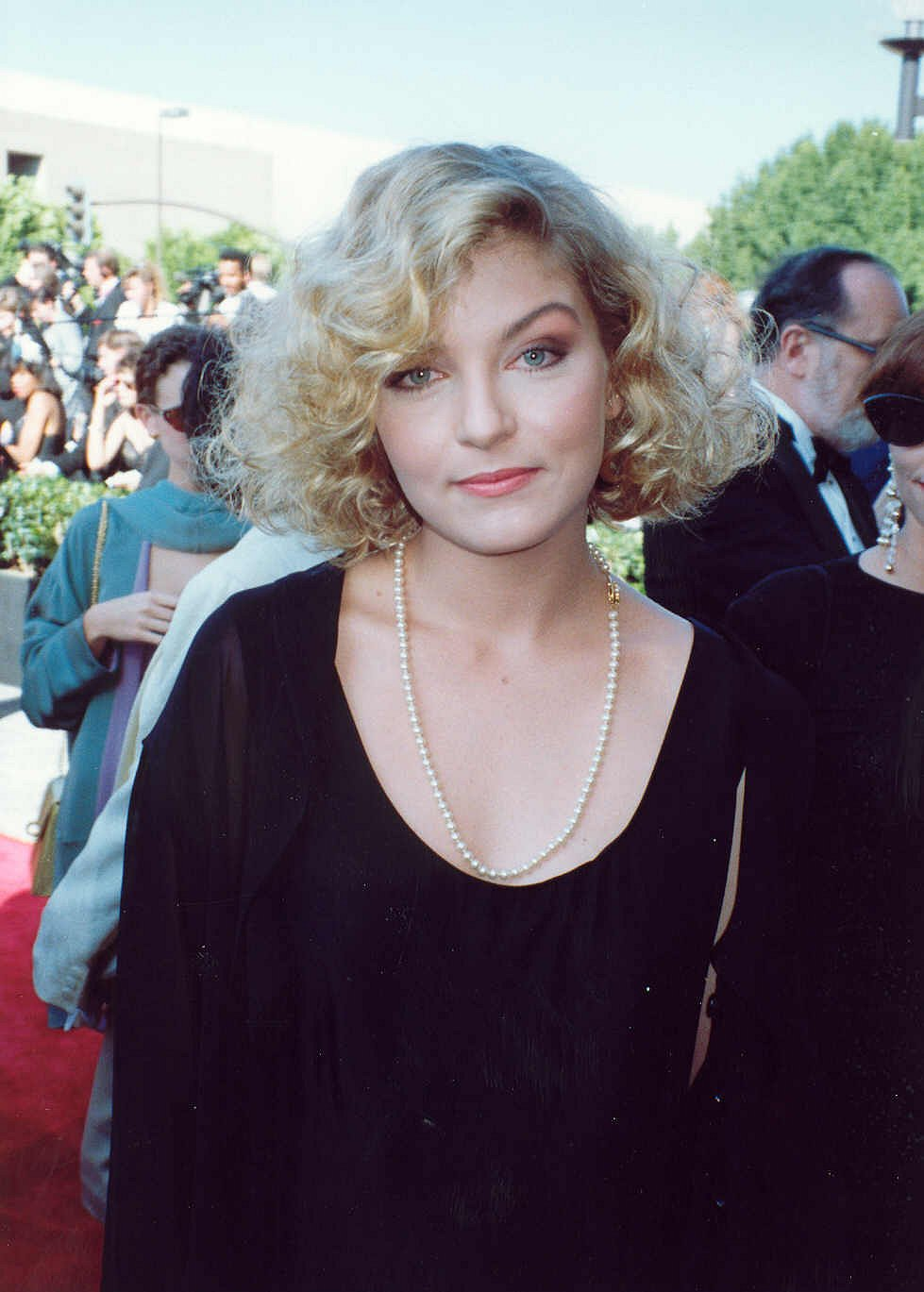
Season one and the first half of season two of Twin Peaks focus on the mystery of who killed Laura Palmer, played by Sheryl Lee, pictured in 1990.

In 1989, local logger Pete Martell discovers a naked corpse wrapped in plastic on the bank of a river outside the town of Twin Peaks, Washington. When Sheriff Harry S. Truman, his deputies, and doctor Will Hayward arrive, the body is identified as high school senior and homecoming queen Laura Palmer. A second girl, Ronette Pulaski, is discovered as well, who is badly injured and dissociative just across the state border.

FBI Special Agent Dale Cooper is called in to investigate. Cooper's initial examination of Laura's body reveals a tiny typed letter "R" inserted under her fingernail. At a town conference, Cooper informs the community that Laura's death matches the signature of a killer who murdered another girl in southwestern Washington the previous year, and that the evidence potentially indicates the killer being from Twin Peaks.

Through Laura's diaries, local law enforcement alongside Agent Cooper discover that she had been living a double life. She was cheating on her boyfriend, football captain Bobby Briggs, with biker James Hurley, and prostituting herself with the help of truck driver Leo Johnson and drug dealer Jacques Renault. Laura was also addicted to cocaine, which she obtained through coercing Bobby into doing business with Jacques.

Laura's father, attorney Leland Palmer, suffers a nervous breakdown after her death. Her best friend Donna Hayward begins a relationship with James. With the help of Laura's cousin Maddy Ferguson, Donna and James discover that Laura's psychiatrist, Dr. Lawrence Jacoby, was obsessed with her, but he is proven innocent of the murder.

Hotelier Ben Horne, the wealthiest man in Twin Peaks, plans to destroy the town's lumber mill along with its owner, Josie Packard, and murder his lover, Josie's sister-in-law and Pete's wife Catherine Martell, so he can purchase the land at a reduced price and complete a development project called Ghostwood. Horne's sultry, troubled daughter, Audrey, becomes infatuated with Agent Cooper and spies on her father for clues in an effort to win Agent Cooper's affection.

Cooper has a dream in which he is approached by a one-armed otherworldly being who calls himself Mike. Mike says that Laura's murderer is a similar entity, Killer Bob, a feral, denim-clad man with long gray hair. Cooper finds himself decades older with Laura and a dwarf in a red business suit, who engages in coded dialogue with Cooper. The next morning, Cooper tells Truman that if they can decipher the dream, they can find out who murdered Laura.

Cooper and the sheriff's department find the one-armed man from Cooper's dream, a traveling shoe salesman named Phillip Gerard. Gerard knows a Bob, the veterinarian who treats Renault's pet bird. Cooper interprets these events to mean that Renault is the murderer, and with Truman's help, tracks Renault to One-Eyed Jack's, a brothel owned by Horne across the border in Canada. He lures Renault back onto U.S. soil to arrest him, but Renault is shot while trying to escape and is hospitalized.

Leland, learning that Renault has been arrested, sneaks into the hospital and smothers him to death. The same night, Horne orders Leo to burn down the lumber mill with Catherine trapped inside and has Leo gunned down by Hank Jennings to ensure Leo's silence. Cooper returns to his room following Renault's arrest and is shot by a masked gunman.

=== Season 2 ===
==== Episodes 1–9, completing the Laura Palmer arc ====
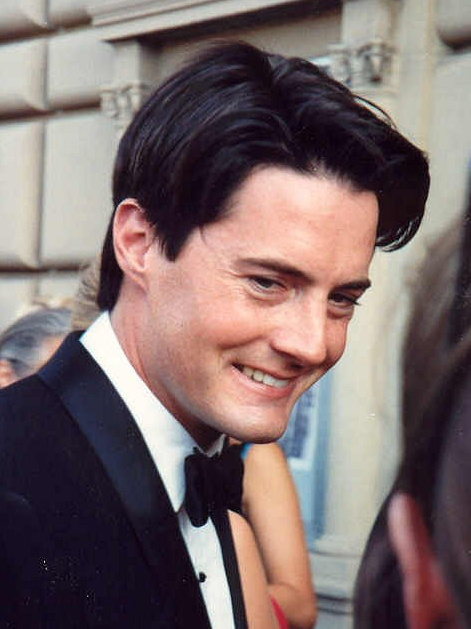
After solving the murder of Laura Palmer, Kyle MacLachlan's (pictured here in 1991) character of Dale Cooper stays in Twin Peaks to investigate further.

Lying hurt in his hotel room, Cooper has a vision in which a giant appears and reveals three clues: "There is a man in a smiling bag," "the owls are not what they seem," and "without chemicals, he points." He takes a gold ring off Cooper's finger and explains that when Cooper understands the three premonitions, his ring will be returned.

Leo Johnson survives his shooting but is left brain-damaged. Catherine Martell disappears, presumed killed in the mill fire. Leland Palmer, whose hair has turned white overnight, returns to work but behaves erratically. Cooper deduces that the "man in the smiling bag" is the corpse of Jacques Renault in a body bag.

Mike is inhabiting the body of Phillip Gerard. His personality surfaces when Gerard forgoes the use of a certain drug. Mike reveals that he and Bob once collaborated in killing humans and that Bob is similarly inhabiting a man in the town. Cooper and the sheriff's department use Mike, in control of Gerard's body, to help find Bob ("without chemicals, he points").

Donna befriends an agoraphobic orchid grower named Harold Smith whom Laura entrusted with her second, secret diary. Harold catches Donna and Maddy attempting to steal the diary from him and hangs himself in despair. Cooper and the sheriff's department take possession of Laura's secret diary and learn that Bob, a friend of her father's, had been sexually abusing her since childhood and she used drugs to cope. They initially suspect that the killer is Ben Horne and arrest him, but Leland Palmer is revealed to be Bob's host when he kills Maddy.

Catherine has returned to town disguised as a Japanese businessman, having survived the mill fire, and manipulates Ben Horne into signing the Ghostwood project over to her. Cooper begins to doubt Horne's guilt, so he gathers all of his suspects in the belief that he will receive a sign to help him identify the killer. The Giant appears and confirms that Leland is Bob's host and Laura's and Maddy's killer, giving Cooper back his ring. Cooper and Truman take Leland into custody. In control of Leland's body, Bob admits to a string of murders, before forcing Leland to commit suicide. As Leland dies, he is freed of Bob's influence and begs for forgiveness. Bob's spirit disappears into the woods in the form of an owl and the lawmen wonder if he will reappear.

==== Episodes 10–22, new characters and storylines ====
Cooper is set to leave Twin Peaks when he is framed for drug trafficking by Jean Renault and is suspended from the FBI. Another FBI agent, Denise Bryson, comes to Twin Peaks to help him. Renault holds Cooper responsible for the death of his brothers, Jacques and Bernard. Jean Renault is killed in a shootout with police, and Cooper is cleared of all charges.

Windom Earle, Cooper's former mentor and FBI partner, escapes from a mental institution and comes to Twin Peaks. Cooper had previously been having an affair with Earle's wife, Caroline, while she was under his protection as a witness to a federal crime. Earle murdered Caroline and wounded Cooper. He now engages Cooper in a twisted game of chess during which Earle murders someone whenever a piece is captured.

Investigating Bob's origin and whereabouts with the help of Major Garland Briggs, Cooper learns of the existence of the White Lodge and the Black Lodge, two extra-dimensional realms whose entrances are somewhere in the woods surrounding Twin Peaks.

Andrew Packard, Josie's husband, is revealed to be still alive while Josie Packard is revealed to be the person who shot Cooper at the end of the first season. Andrew forces Josie to confront his business rival and her tormentor from Hong Kong, the sinister Thomas Eckhardt. Josie kills Eckhardt, but she mysteriously dies when Truman and Cooper try to apprehend her.

Cooper falls in love with a new arrival in town, Annie Blackburn. Earle captures the brain-damaged Leo for use as a henchman and abandons his chess game with Cooper. When Annie wins the Miss Twin Peaks contest, Earle kidnaps her and takes her to the entrance to the Black Lodge, whose power he seeks to use for himself.

Through a series of clues Cooper discovers the entrance to the Black Lodge, which turns out to be the strange, red-curtained room from his dream. He is greeted by the Dwarf, the Giant, and Laura Palmer, who each give Cooper cryptic messages. Searching for Annie and Earle, Cooper encounters doppelgängers of various people, including Maddy Ferguson and Leland Palmer. Cooper finds Earle, who demands Cooper's soul in exchange for Annie's life. Cooper agrees but Bob appears and takes Earle's soul for himself. Bob then turns to Cooper, who is chased through the lodge by a doppelgänger of himself.

Outside the lodge, Andrew Packard, Pete Martell and Audrey Horne are caught in an explosion at a bank vault, a trap laid by the dead Eckhardt.

Cooper and Annie reappear in the woods, both injured. Annie is taken to the hospital but Cooper recovers in his room at the Great Northern Hotel. It becomes clear that the "Cooper" who emerged from the Lodge is in fact his doppelgänger, under Bob's control. He smashes his head into a bathroom mirror and laughs maniacally.

=== Season 3 ===
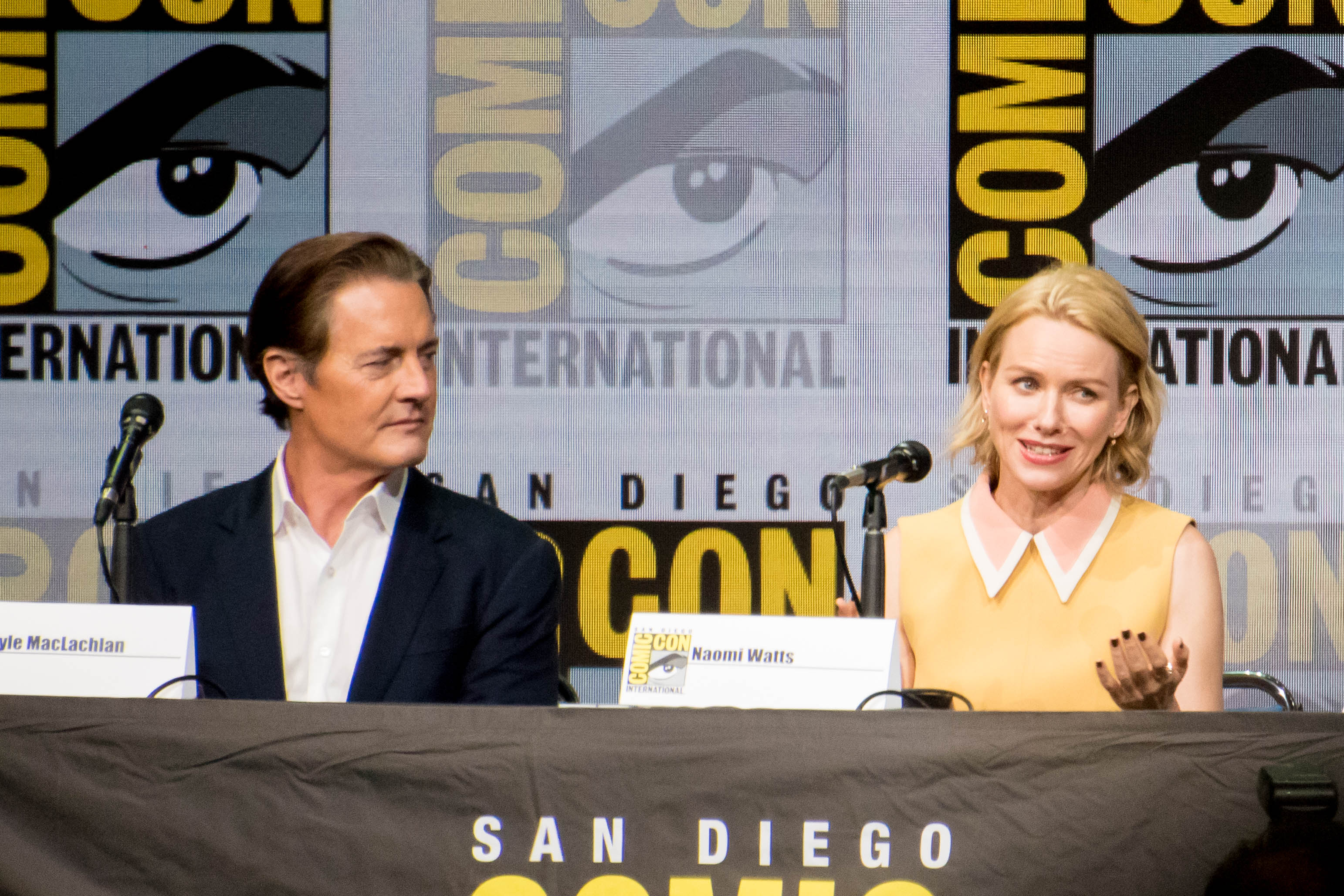
Kyle MacLachlan and Naomi Watts appear in the third season

The third season takes place 25 years after the cliffhanger ending of season two, and also expands on narrative elements introduced in the prequel film, Twin Peaks: Fire Walk with Me, released after the second season. Cooper remains trapped in the Black Lodge and prepares his return to the world. For the previous two decades, Cooper's evil doppelgänger has lived in Cooper's place and works to prevent his own imminent return to the Black Lodge with the help of various associates. Meanwhile, the mysterious murder of a librarian in Buckhorn, South Dakota attracts the attention of Cole and his colleagues, while a message from the Log Lady (Catherine Coulson) leads members of the Twin Peaks Sheriff's Department to reopen investigations into the events surrounding the 1989 murder of Laura Palmer and Cooper's subsequent disappearance.

Season 3 of Twin Peaks was announced on October 6, 2014, as a limited series that would air on Showtime. David Lynch and Mark Frost wrote all the episodes, and Lynch directed. Frost emphasized that the new episodes were not a remake or reboot, but a continuation of the series and film, and the passage of 25 years is an important element of the plot. The third season is also known as Twin Peaks: The Return and Twin Peaks: A Limited Event Series.

Most of the original cast returned, including Kyle MacLachlan, Mädchen Amick, Sherilyn Fenn, Sheryl Lee, Ray Wise, and several others. Additions included Jeremy Davies, Laura Dern, Robert Forster, Tim Roth, Jennifer Jason Leigh, Amanda Seyfried, Matthew Lillard, and Naomi Watts.

== Series overview ==
Season	Episodes	Originally released		
Season	Episodes	First released	Last released	Network
1	8	April 8, 1990	May 23, 1990	ABC
2	22	September 30, 1990	June 10, 1991	ABC
Fire Walk with Me		August 28, 1992		N/A
3	18	May 21, 2017	September 3, 2017	Showtime

== Cast ==
=== Main cast ===
- Kyle MacLachlan as Special Agent Dale Cooper, an FBI agent assigned to investigate the murder of Laura Palmer
- Michael Ontkean as Sheriff Harry S. Truman, the local sheriff (seasons 1–2)
- Mädchen Amick as Shelly Johnson, a young diner waitress in an abusive marriage
- Dana Ashbrook as Bobby Briggs, Laura's boyfriend
- Richard Beymer as Benjamin Horne, a local businessman who owns the Great Northern Hotel
- Lara Flynn Boyle as Donna Hayward, Laura's best friend (seasons 1–2)
- Sherilyn Fenn as Audrey Horne, Benjamin's daughter and classmate of Laura
- Warren Frost as Dr. Will Hayward, Donna's father and the town physician
- Peggy Lipton as Norma Jennings, owner of the Double R diner
- James Marshall as James Hurley, a classmate and friend of Laura and Donna
- Everett McGill as Ed Hurley, James' uncle and friend of Sheriff Truman
- Jack Nance as Pete Martell, husband of Catherine Martell (seasons 1–2)
- Ray Wise as Leland Palmer, Laura's father and Horne's lawyer
- Joan Chen as Jocelyn "Josie" Packard, Catherine's sister-in-law and owner of the lucrative Twin Peaks mill (seasons 1–2)
- Piper Laurie as Catherine Martell, Josie's sister-in-law and a businesswoman (seasons 1–2)
- Kimmy Robertson as Lucy Moran, the sheriff station secretary (season 2, recurring season 1)

=== Secondary cast ===
- Eric Da Re as Leo Johnson, Shelly's husband and a trucker who often has run-ins with the law. (seasons 1–2)
- Harry Goaz as Deputy Sheriff Andy Brennan, a naive deputy
- Michael Horse as Deputy Sheriff Tommy "Hawk" Hill, an expert tracker
- Sheryl Lee as Laura Palmer and Madeleine "Maddy" Ferguson, two identical cousins. Laura, a popular and beloved Twin Peaks resident, is killed, and her death brings Maddy to town.
- Russ Tamblyn as Dr. Lawrence Jacoby, the town psychiatrist
- Kenneth Welsh as Windom Earle, Agent Cooper's former partner at the Bureau (season 2)

=== Recurring cast ===
- Wendy Robie as Nadine Hurley, Big Ed's wife
- Don Davis as Major Garland Briggs, Bobby's father who is involved in classified Air Force experiments (seasons 1–2)
- Chris Mulkey as Hank Jennings, Norma's husband out on parole (seasons 1–2)
- Gary Hershberger as Mike Nelson, a friend of Bobby's
- Grace Zabriskie as Sarah Palmer, Laura's mother
- Catherine E. Coulson as Margaret Lanterman / "The Log Lady", a mysterious resident of the town who always carries a log around
- Ian Buchanan as Dick Tremayne, a menswear salesman wooing Lucy (season 2)
- Mary Jo Deschanel as Eileen Hayward, Donna's mother (seasons 1–2)
- Frank Silva as Killer BOB, a suspect in Laura's murder
- Al Strobel as Phillip Michael Gerard / MIKE / "The One-Armed Man", a shoe salesman
- David Patrick Kelly as Jerry Horne, Ben's brother and business partner
- Miguel Ferrer as Special Agent Albert Rosenfield, a Bureau agent who frequently assists Agent Cooper
- John Boylan as Mayor Dwayne Milford, the town's mayor (seasons 1–2)
- Victoria Catlin as Blackie O'Reilly, the madam of One-Eyed Jacks (seasons 1–2)
- Charlotte Stewart as Betty Briggs, Bobby's mother
- David Lynch as Bureau Chief Gordon Cole, the local Bureau Chief who comes to Twin Peaks to assist in Laura's case
- Heather Graham as Annie Blackburn, Norma's sister (season 2)
- Robyn Lively as Lana Budding Milford, town vixen and later Dougie Milford's wife and the Mayor's girlfriend (season 2)
- Dan O'Herlihy as Andrew Packard, Josie's husband and Catherine's brother (season 2)
- Billy Zane as John Justice Wheeler, a young business partner of Benjamin Horne (season 2)
- Don Amendolia as Emory Battis, an employee of Benjamin Horne (seasons 1–2)
- James Booth as Ernie Niles, Norma's stepfather (season 2)
- Michael Parks as Jean Renault, a Canadian criminal involved with One-Eyed Jacks (season 2)
- Carel Struycken as The Giant, a mysterious entity who gives Agent Cooper clues to find Laura's killer (seasons 2–3)
- Phoebe Augustine as Ronette Pulaski, Laura's classmate who survived the attack on them both
- Robert Davenport (pilot only) and Robert Bauer as Johnny Horne, Audrey's brother who has special needs
- Lenny Von Dohlen as Harold Smith, a local shut-in who was involved with Laura (season 2)
- Hank Worden as The Elderly Room Service Waiter, a Great Northern employee who unwittingly aids Cooper in his investigation (season 2)
- Michael J. Anderson as The Man from Another Place, a mysterious entity who appears in Cooper's dreams in the Red Room, alongside Laura
- David Duchovny as DEA Agent Denise Bryson, a transgender DEA agent who assists Cooper (seasons 2–3)
- Jan D'Arcy as Sylvia Horne, Audrey's mother and Ben's wife
- Tony Jay as Dougie Milford, the Mayor's brother and Lana's husband (season 2)
- Walter Olkewicz as Jacques Renault, Jean Renault's brother who is a suspect in Laura's death
- David Warner as Thomas Eckhardt, a businessman involved with Josie and the mill (season 2)
- Annette McCarthy as Evelyn Marsh, a woman whom James meets while traveling out of town (season 2)
- Jessica Wallenfels as Harriet Hayward, Donna's sister (seasons 1–2)
- Alicia Witt as Gersten Hayward, Donna's sister (seasons 2–3)
- Andrea Hays as Heidi, waitress at the Double R Diner

== Production ==
=== Development ===
In the 1980s, Mark Frost worked for three years as a writer for the television police drama Hill Street Blues (1981–1987), which featured a large cast and extended storylines. Following his success with The Elephant Man (1980) and Blue Velvet (1986), David Lynch was hired by a Warner Bros. executive to direct a film about the life of Marilyn Monroe named Venus Descending, based on the best-selling book Goddess. Lynch recalls being "sort of interested. I loved the idea of this woman in trouble, but I didn't know if I liked it being a real story."

Lynch and Frost first worked together on the Goddess screenplay, and although the project was dropped by Warner Bros., they became good friends. They went on to work as writer and director for One Saliva Bubble, a film with Steve Martin attached to star, but it was never made either. Lynch's agent, Tony Krantz, encouraged him to do a television show. Lynch said: "Tony I don't want to do a TV show."

He took Lynch to Nibblers restaurant in Los Angeles and said: "You should do a show about real life in America—your vision of America the same way you demonstrated it in Blue Velvet." Lynch got an "idea of a small-town thing", and though he and Frost were not keen on it, they decided to humor Krantz. Frost wanted to tell "a sort of Dickensian story about multiple lives in a contained area that could sort of go perpetually". Originally, the show was to be titled North Dakota and set in the Plains region of North Dakota.

After Frost, Krantz, and Lynch rented a screening room in Beverly Hills and screened Peyton Place, they decided to develop the town before its inhabitants. Due to the lack of forests and mountains in North Dakota, the title was changed from North Dakota to Northwest Passage (the title of the pilot episode), and the location to the Pacific Northwest, specifically Washington. They then drew a map and decided that there would be a lumber mill in the town. Then they came up with an image of a body washing up on the shore of a lake.

Lynch remembers: "We knew where everything was located and that helped us determine the prevailing atmosphere and what might happen there." Frost remembers that he and Lynch came up with the notion of the girl next door leading a "desperate double life" that would end in murder. The idea was inspired, in part, by the unsolved 1908 murder of Hazel Irene Drew in Sand Lake, New York.

Lynch and Frost pitched the idea to ABC during the 1988 Writers Guild of America strike in a ten-minute meeting with the network's drama head, Chad Hoffman, with nothing more than this image and a concept. According to the director, the mystery of who killed Laura Palmer was initially going to be in the foreground, but would recede gradually as viewers got to know the other townsfolk and the problems they were having. Lynch and Frost wanted to mix a police investigation with a soap opera. ABC liked the idea and asked Lynch and Frost to write a screenplay for the pilot episode. They had been talking about the project for three months and wrote the screenplay in 10 days. Frost wrote more verbal characters, like Benjamin Horne, while Lynch was responsible for Agent Cooper. According to Lynch, "He says a lot of the things I say."

ABC Entertainment President Brandon Stoddard ordered the two-hour pilot for a possible fall 1989 series. He left the position in March 1989 as Lynch went into production. They filmed the pilot for $4 million with an agreement with ABC that they would shoot an additional "ending" to it so that it could be sold directly to video in Europe as a feature film if the TV show was not picked up. ABC's Bob Iger and his creative team took over, saw the dailies, and met with Frost and Lynch to get the arc of the stories and characters.

Although Iger liked the pilot, he had difficulty persuading the rest of the network executives. Iger suggested showing it to a more diverse, younger group, who liked it, and the executive subsequently convinced ABC to buy seven episodes at $1.1 million apiece. Some executives figured that the show would never get on the air or that it might run as a seven-hour mini-series, but Iger planned to schedule it for the spring. The final showdown occurred during a bi-coastal conference call between Iger and a room full of New York executives; Iger won, and Twin Peaks was on the air.

Each episode took a week to shoot, and after directing the second episode, Lynch went off to complete Wild at Heart, while Frost wrote the remaining segments. Standards and Practices had an issue with a scene from the first season: an extreme close-up in the pilot of Cooper's hand as he slid tweezers under Laura's fingernail and removed a tiny "R". They wanted the scene to be shorter because it made them uncomfortable, but Frost and Lynch refused, and the scene remained.

=== Casting ===
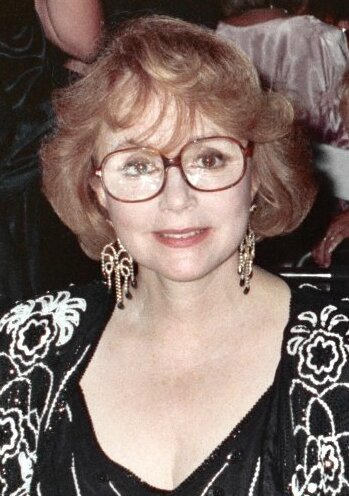
Veteran film actress Piper Laurie (pictured here in 1990) helped cement the Twin Peaks cast.

Twin Peaks features members of a loose ensemble of Lynch's favorite character actors, including Jack Nance, Kyle MacLachlan, Grace Zabriskie, and Everett McGill. Isabella Rossellini, who had worked with Lynch on Blue Velvet, was originally cast as Giovanna Packard, but she dropped out of the production before shooting began on the pilot episode. The character was then reconceived as Josie Packard, of Chinese ethnicity, and the role given to actress Joan Chen. The cast includes several actors who rose to fame in the 1950s and 1960s, including 1950s film stars Richard Beymer, Piper Laurie, and Russ Tamblyn. Other veteran actors included British actor James Booth (Zulu), Michael Ontkean, who co-starred in the 1970s crime drama The Rookies, and former The Mod Squad star Peggy Lipton (with her co-star from that series, Clarence Williams III, in a smaller role). Kyle MacLachlan was cast as Agent Dale Cooper. Stage actor and Mark Frost's father Warren Frost was cast as Dr. Will Hayward.

Due to budget constraints, Lynch intended to cast a local girl from Seattle as Laura Palmer, reportedly "just to play a dead girl". The local girl ended up being Sheryl Lee. Lynch stated: "But no one—not Mark, me, anyone—had any idea that she could act, or that she was going to be so powerful just being dead." And then, while Lynch shot the home movie that James takes of Donna and Laura, he realized that Lee had something special. "She did do another scene—the video with Donna on the picnic—and it was that scene that did it." As a result, Sheryl Lee became a semi-regular addition to the cast, appearing in flashbacks as Laura, and portraying another, recurring character: Maddy Ferguson, Laura's similar-looking cousin.

The appearance of the character Phillip Gerard in the pilot episode was originally intended to be only a "kind of homage to The Fugitive. The only thing he was gonna do was be in this elevator and walk out", according to David Lynch. However, when Lynch wrote the "Fire walk with me" speech, he imagined Al Strobel, who played Gerard, reciting it in the basement of the Twin Peaks hospital—a scene that appeared in the European version of the pilot episode, and surfaced later in Agent Cooper's dream sequence. Gerard's full name, Phillip Michael Gerard, is also a reference to Lieutenant Phillip Gerard, a character in The Fugitive.

Lynch met Michael J. Anderson in 1987. After seeing him in a short film, Lynch wanted to cast the actor in the title role in Ronnie Rocket, but that project failed to get made.

Richard Beymer was cast as Ben Horne because he had known Johanna Ray, Lynch's casting director. Lynch was familiar with Beymer's work in the 1961 film West Side Story and was surprised that Beymer was available for the role. (Note: This was also the first project to reunite Beymer and Russ Tamblyn since West Side Story, in which Tamblyn played the character of Riff. "Secrets from Another Place", a featurette in the Twin Peaks Definitive Gold Box Edition DVD release of October 2007.)

Set dresser Frank Silva was cast as the mysterious "Bob". Lynch himself recalls that the idea originated when he overheard Silva moving furniture around in the bedroom set, and then heard a woman warning Silva not to block himself in by moving furniture in front of the door. Lynch was struck with an image of Silva in the room. When he learned that Silva was an actor, he filmed two panning shots, one with Silva at the base of the bed, and one without; he did not yet know how he would use this material.

Later that day, during the filming of Sarah Palmer having a vision, the camera operator told Lynch that the shot was ruined because "Frank [Silva] was reflected in the mirror." Lynch comments: "Things like this happen and make you start dreaming. And one thing leads to another, and if you let it, a whole other thing opens up." Lynch used the panning shot of Silva in the bedroom, and the shot featuring Silva's reflection, in the closing scenes of the European version of the pilot episode. Silva's reflection in the mirror can also be glimpsed during the scene of Sarah's vision at the end of the original pilot, but it is less clear. A close-up of Silva in the bedroom later became a significant image in episodes of the TV series.

==== Representation ====
Denise Bryson (David Duchovny) is a transgender FBI agent who is introduced in season two. When she is reintroduced to audiences in the third season, she has a conversation where Gordon Cole (David Lynch) informs Bryson that he told her transphobic colleagues to "fix their hearts or die." Over the years, this quote has been adopted by the LGBTQ+ community, particularly those in the trans community, with Bryson becoming a cult icon for transgender women.

Through the run of Twin Peaks, there is a limited cast of characters of color. Frank Guan of Vulture stated that "Lynch's focus on archetypes and myths necessarily ties him to stereotype," specifically referring to the treatment of Black and Asian characters within Lynch's collected work. Yellowface is also present in season two with Catherine Martell (Piper Laurie) masquerading as a Japanese businessman named Mr. Tojamura for several episodes. Lynch and Laurie kept the fact that the actress was playing Mr. Tojamura secret, including from cast and crew, until it was revealed on screen. Deputy Hawk (Michael Horse) is a Native American deputy who, some say, functioned to be a "generic Native American tasked with ameliorating settler guilt" through cryptic dialogue.

=== Music ===
"Twin Peaks Theme"
A 30 second sample of Angelo Badalamenti's Twin Peaks theme

The score for Twin Peaks has received acclaim; The Guardian wrote that it "still marks the summit of TV soundtracks". In fall 1989, composer Angelo Badalamenti and Lynch created the score for the show. In 20 minutes they produced the signature theme for the series. Badalamenti called it the "Love Theme from Twin Peaks". Lynch told him: "You just wrote 75% of the score. It's the mood of the whole piece. It is Twin Peaks."

While creating the score, Lynch often described the moods or emotions he wanted the music to evoke, and Badalamenti began to play the piano. In the scenes dominated by young men, they are accompanied by music that Badalamenti called Cool Jazz. The characters' masculinity was enhanced by finger-snapping, "cocktail-lounge electric piano, pulsing bass, and lightly brushed percussion." A handful of the motifs were borrowed from Julee Cruise's 1989 album Floating into the Night, which was written in large part by Badalamenti and Lynch and was released in 1989. This album also serves as the soundtrack to another Lynch project, Industrial Symphony No. 1, a live Cruise performance also featuring Michael J. Anderson.

An instrumental version of the song "Falling" became the theme to the show, and the songs "Rockin' Back Inside My Heart", "The Nightingale", "The World Spins", and "Into the Night" (found in their full versions on the album) were all, except the last, used as Cruise's roadhouse performances during the show's run. The lyrics for all five songs were written by Lynch. A second volume of the soundtrack was released on October 30, 2007, to coincide with the Definitive Gold Box DVD set.

In March 2011, Lynch began releasing The Twin Peaks Archive – a collection of previously unavailable tracks from the series and the film via his website. As of February 2024, the site is no longer active and it appears there is no way to legally obtain the bundle of all files previously offered for sale.

=== Filming locations ===
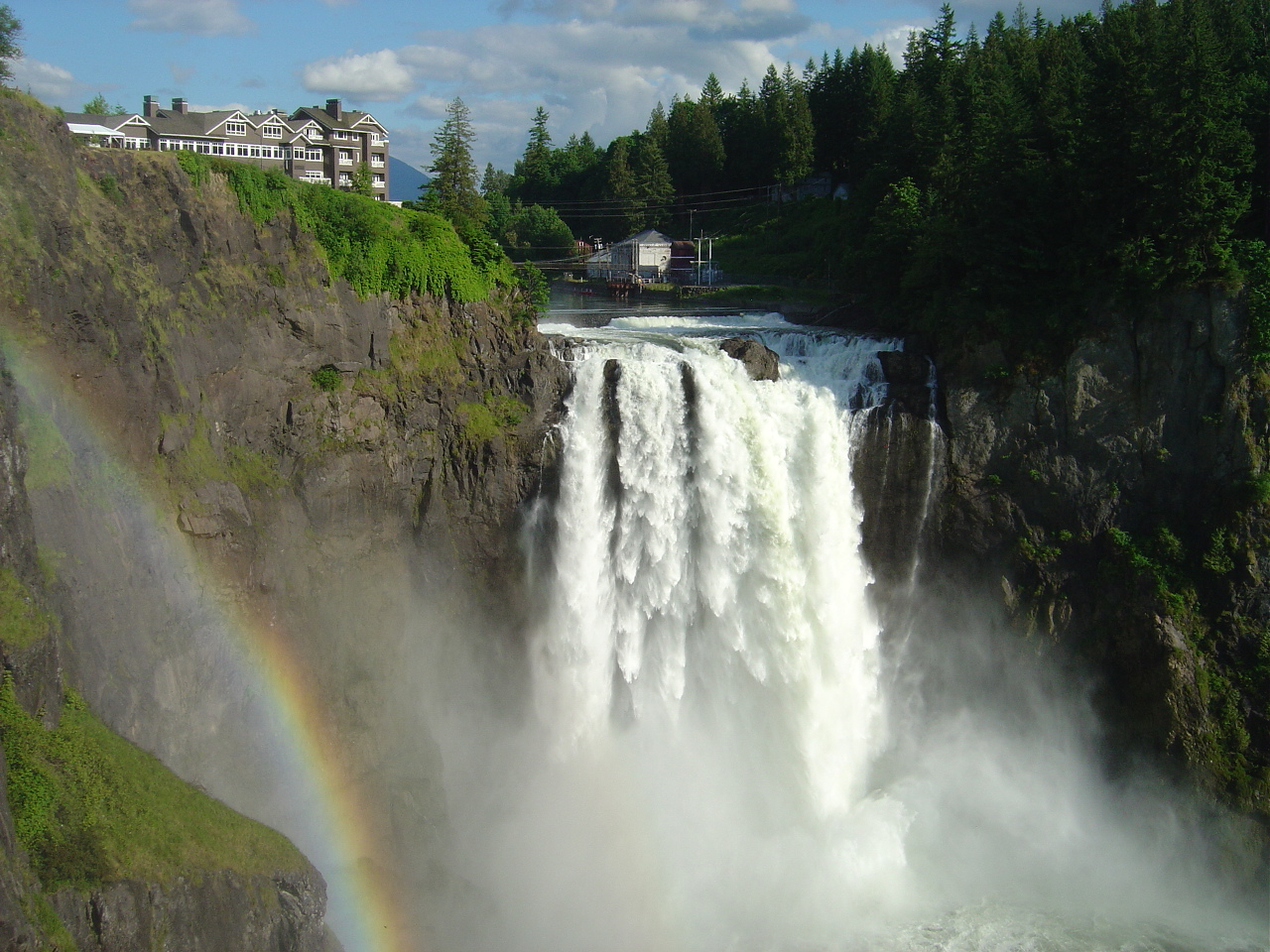
Snoqualmie Falls, June 2008

Agent Cooper states, in the pilot episode, that Twin Peaks is "five miles south of the Canadian border, and twelve miles west of the state line." This places it in the Salmo-Priest Wilderness, near the real life location of Metaline Falls, Washington. Lynch and Frost started their location search in Snoqualmie, Washington, on the recommendation of a friend of Frost. They found all of the locations that they had written into the pilot episode.

The towns of Snoqualmie, North Bend and Fall City – which became the primary filming locations for stock Twin Peaks exterior footage – are about an hour's drive from the town of Roslyn, Washington, the town used for the series Northern Exposure. Many exterior scenes were filmed in wooded areas of Malibu, California. Most of the interior scenes were shot on standing sets in a San Fernando Valley warehouse.

The soap opera show-within-the-show Invitation to Love was not shot on a studio set, but in the Ennis House, an architectural landmark designed by Frank Lloyd Wright in the Hollywood area of Los Angeles.

=== Filming ===
Mark Frost and David Lynch made use of repeating and sometimes mysterious motifs such as trees (especially fir and pines), coffee and doughnuts, cherry pie, owls, logs, ducks, water, fire — and numerous embedded references to other films and TV shows.

During the filming of the scene in which Cooper first examines Laura's body, a malfunctioning fluorescent lamp above the table flickered constantly, but Lynch decided not to replace it, since he liked the disconcerting effect that it created.

Cooper's dream at the end of the third episode, which became a driving plot point in the series's first season and ultimately held the key to the identity of Laura's murderer, was never scripted. The idea came to Lynch one afternoon after touching the side of a hot car left out in the sun: "I was leaning against a car—the front of me was leaning against this very warm car. My hands were on the roof and the metal was very hot. The Red Room scene leapt into my mind. 'Little Mike' was there, and he was speaking backwards... For the rest of the night I thought only about the Red Room."

The footage was originally shot along with the pilot, to be used as the conclusion were it to be released as a feature film. When the series was picked up, Lynch decided to incorporate some of the footage; in the fourth episode, Cooper, narrating the dream, outlines the shot footage which Lynch did not incorporate, such as Mike shooting Bob and the fact that he is 25 years older when he meets Laura Palmer's spirit.

== Reception and legacy ==
Before the one-and-a-half-hour pilot episode premiered on television, a screening was held at the Museum of Broadcasting in Hollywood. Media analyst and advertising executive Paul Schulman said: "I don't think it has a chance of succeeding. It is not commercial, it is radically different from what we as viewers are accustomed to seeing, there's no one in the show to root for." The show's Thursday night time slot had not been a good one for soap operas, as both Dynasty and its short-lived spin-off The Colbys did poorly.

Initially, the show received a positive response from TV critics. Tom Shales, in The Washington Post, wrote: "Twin Peaks disorients you in ways that small-screen productions seldom attempt. It's a pleasurable sensation, the floor dropping out and leaving one dangling." In The New York Times, John J. O'Connor wrote: "Twin Peaks is not a send-up of the form. Mr. Lynch clearly savors the standard ingredients ... but then the director adds his own peculiar touches, small passing details that suddenly, and often hilariously, thrust the commonplace out of kilter." Entertainment Weekly gave the show an "A+" rating, and Ken Tucker wrote: "Plot is irrelevant; moments are everything. Lynch and Frost have mastered a way to make a weekly series endlessly interesting." Richard Zoglin in Time magazine said that it "may be the most hauntingly original work ever done for American TV".

The pilot was the highest-rated movie for the 1989–90 season with a 22 rating and was viewed by 33% of the audience. In its first broadcast as a regular one-hour drama series, Twin Peaks scored ABC's highest ratings in four years in its 9:00 pm Thursday time slot. The show also reduced NBC's popular sitcom Cheers's ratings. Twin Peaks had a 16.2 rating, with each point equaling 921,000 homes with TVs. The episode added new viewers because of what ABC's senior vice-president of research, Alan Wurtzel, called "the water cooler syndrome", in which people talk about the series the next day at work.

The show's third episode lost 14% of the audience that had tuned in a week before. That audience had dropped 30% from the show's first appearance on Thursday night. This was a result of competing against Cheers, which also appealed to the same demographic that watched Twin Peaks. A production executive from the show spoke of being frustrated with the network's scheduling of the show. "The show is being banged around on Thursday night. If ABC had put it on Wednesday night it could have built on its initial success. ABC has put the show at risk."

In response, the network aired the first-season finale on a Wednesday night at 10:00 pm instead of its usual 9:00 pm Thursday slot. The show achieved its best ratings since its third week on the air with a 12.6 and a 22 share of the audience. On May 22, 1990, it was announced that Twin Peaks would be renewed for a second season.

In the first and second season, the search for Laura Palmer's killer served as the engine for the plot and captured the public's imagination, although the creators admitted that this was largely a MacGuffin. Each episode was really about the interactions between the townsfolk. The unique and often bizarre personalities of each citizen formed a web of minutiae that ran contrary to the town's quaint appearance. Adding to the surreal atmosphere was the recurrence of Dale Cooper's dreams, in which the FBI agent is given clues to Laura's murder in a supernatural realm that may or may not be of his imagination. The first season contained only eight episodes, including the hour-and-a-half long pilot episode. It was considered technically and artistically revolutionary for television at the time and geared toward reaching the standards of film.

Critics have noted that Twin Peaks began the trend of accomplished cinematography now commonplace in today's television dramas. Lynch and Frost maintained tight control over the first season and served as showrunners, handpicking all of the directors, including some whom Lynch had known from his days at the American Film Institute (e.g., Caleb Deschanel and Tim Hunter) and some referred to him by those he knew personally. Lynch and Frost were less involved and exercised less control in the second season, corresponding with what is generally regarded as a decrease in the show's quality once the identity of Laura Palmer's murderer was revealed.

While Frost and Lynch technically remained showrunners after Episode 14, the episode in which the killer's identity was revealed, Lynch had little creative control over the direction of the series from that point forward other than the season finale. Frost became less involved after Episode 16 and became more involved again with Episode 26 onwards. After Episode 14, series producers Harley Peyton and Robert Engels served as additional showrunners along with Frost and Lynch.

The aforementioned "water cooler effect" put pressure on the show's creators to solve the mystery. Although they claimed to have known from the series' inception the identity of Laura's murderer, Lynch never wanted to solve the murder, while Frost felt that they had an obligation to the audience to solve it. This created tension between the two men.

Its ambitious style, paranormal undertones, and engaging murder mystery made Twin Peaks an unexpected hit. Its characters, particularly MacLachlan's Dale Cooper, were unorthodox for a supposed crime drama, as was Cooper's method of interpreting his dreams to solve the crime. During its first season, the show's popularity reached its zenith, and elements of the program seeped into mainstream popular culture, prompting parodies, including one in the 16th-season premiere of Saturday Night Live, hosted by MacLachlan.

=== Critical acclaim ===
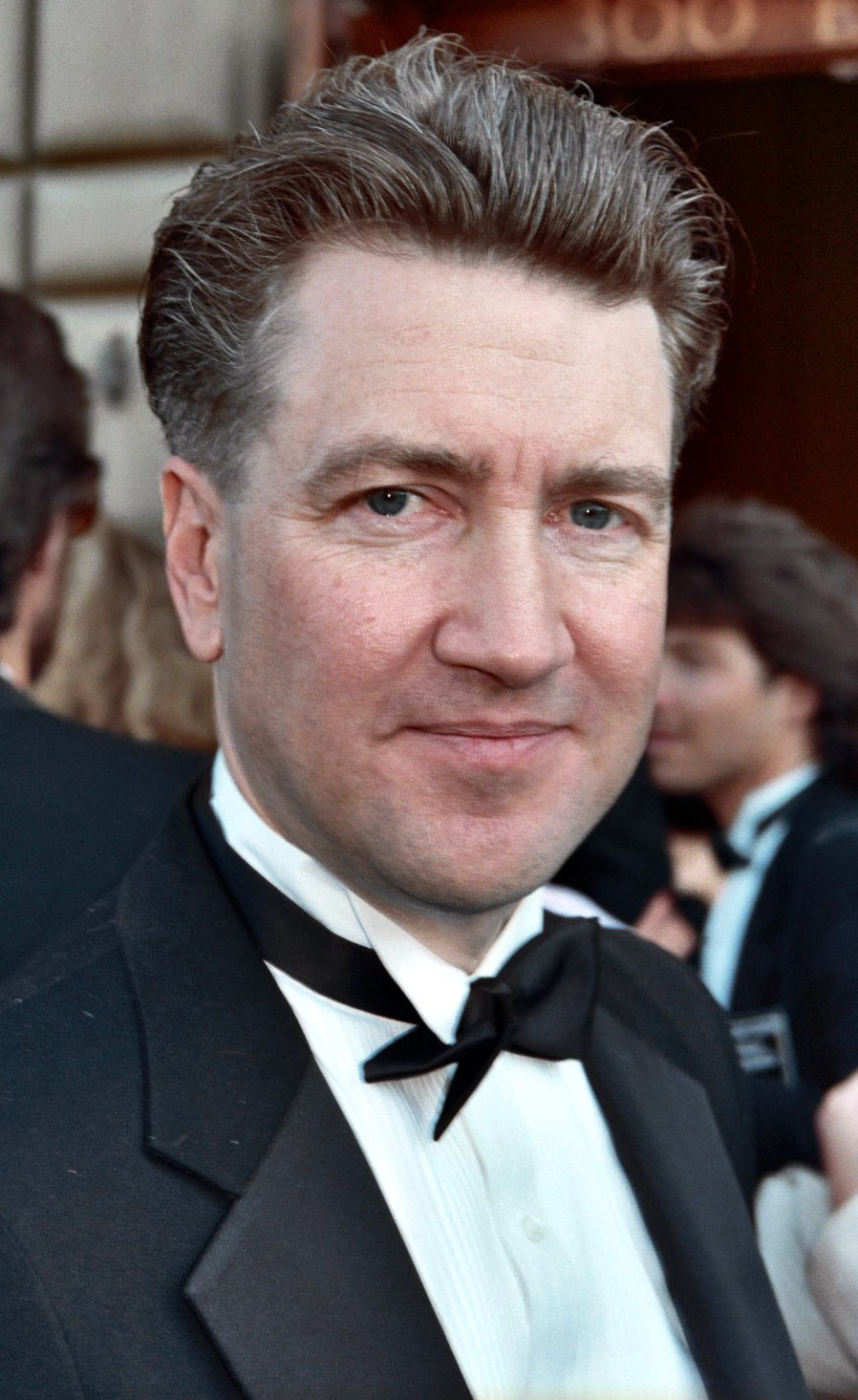
David Lynch at the 1990 Primetime Emmy Awards, where Twin Peaks was nominated for fourteen awards. He was nominated for directing and co-writing the pilot episode.

Critical response of Twin Peaks
Season	Rotten Tomatoes	Metacritic
1	91% (116 reviews)	96 (16 reviews)
2	64% (165 reviews)	—N/a
3	94% (462 reviews)	74 (26 reviews)

For its first season, Twin Peaks received fourteen nominations at the 42nd Primetime Emmy Awards, for Outstanding Drama Series, Outstanding Lead Actor in a Drama Series (Kyle MacLachlan), Outstanding Lead Actress in a Drama Series (Piper Laurie), Outstanding Supporting Actress in a Drama Series (Sherilyn Fenn), Outstanding Directing for a Drama Series (David Lynch), Outstanding Writing for a Drama Series (David Lynch and Mark Frost), Outstanding Writing for a Drama Series (Harley Peyton), Outstanding Art Direction for a Single-Camera Series (Patricia Norris and Leslie Morales), Outstanding Original Main Title Theme Music (Angelo Badalamenti and David Lynch), Outstanding Music Composition for a Series (Original Dramatic Score) (Angelo Badalamenti), Outstanding Original Music and Lyrics (Angelo Badalamenti and David Lynch), and Outstanding Sound Editing for a Series. Out of its fourteen nominations, it won for Outstanding Achievement in Costume Design for a Drama or Comedy Series (Patricia Norris) and Outstanding Editing for a Series – Single Camera Production.

On Rotten Tomatoes, the first season received a 91 percent approval rating with an average score of 8.95 out of 10 based on 116 reviews, with a critics consensus of: "Twin Peaks plays with TV conventions to deliver a beguiling – and unsettling – blend of seemingly disparate genres, adding up to an offbeat drama with a distinctly unique appeal." Metacritic scored the season 96 out of 100 based on 16 reviews.

For its second season, it received four nominations at the 43rd Primetime Emmy Awards, for Outstanding Lead Actor in a Drama Series (Kyle MacLachlan), Outstanding Supporting Actress in a Drama Series (Piper Laurie), Outstanding Sound Editing for a Series, and Outstanding Sound Mixing for a Drama Series. On Rotten Tomatoes, the second season received a 64 percent approval rating with an average score of 7.65 out of 10 based on 165 reviews, with a critics consensus of: "Twin Peaks answers its central question with diminishing returns while struggling to establish worthy new mysteries, but there are enough mesmeric flourishes to keep devotees dreaming of what lies in the Red Room."

At the 48th Golden Globe Awards, it won for Best Television Series – Drama, Kyle MacLachlan won for Best Performance by an Actor in a TV Series – Drama, Piper Laurie won for Best Performance by an Actress in a Supporting Role in a Series, Mini-Series or Motion Picture Made for TV; while Sherilyn Fenn was nominated in the same category as Laurie.

Numerous publications have listed Twin Peaks among the greatest television series of all time. (Note: Attributed to multiple sources.) The pilot episode was ranked 25th on TV Guide's 1997 100 Greatest Episodes of All Time. It placed 49th on Entertainment Weekly's "New TV Classics" list. In 2004 and 2007, Twin Peaks was ranked 20th and 24th on TV Guide's Top Cult Shows Ever, and in 2002, it was ranked 45th of the "Top 50 Television Programs of All Time" by the same guide. In 2007, UK broadcaster Channel 4 ranked Twin Peaks 9th on their list of the "50 Greatest TV Dramas". In 2007, Time included the show on their list of the "100 Best TV Shows of All-Time". In 2011, Empire listed Twin Peaks as the 24th best TV show in their list of "The 50 Greatest TV Shows of All Time".

In 2012, Entertainment Weekly listed the show at no. 12 in the "25 Best Cult TV Shows from the Past 25 Years", saying: "The show itself was only fitfully brilliant and ultimately unfulfilling, but the cult lives, fueled by nostalgia for the extraordinary pop phenomenon it inspired, for its significance to the medium (behold the big bang of auteur TV!), and for a sensuous strangeness that possesses you and never lets you go." The series has been nominated for the TCA Heritage Award six consecutive years since 2010, winning the award in 2024. It was ranked 20th on The Hollywood Reporter's list of Hollywood's 100 Favorite TV Shows.

=== Declining ratings ===
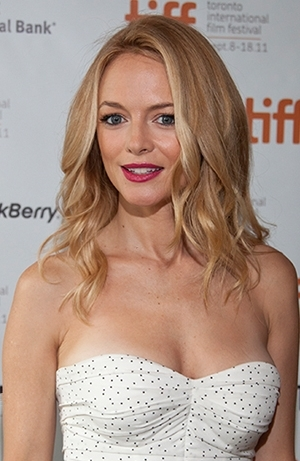
As the series' ratings started to decline, the producers added Heather Graham (seen here in 2011) to the cast.

With the resolution of Twin Peaks' main drawing point (Laura Palmer's murder) in the middle of the second season, and with subsequent storylines becoming more obscure and drawn out, public interest began to wane. This discontent, coupled with ABC changing its timeslot on a number of occasions, led to a huge drop in the show's ratings after being one of the most watched television programs in the United States in 1990. Due to the Gulf War, Twin Peaks was moved from its usual time slot "for six weeks out of eight" in early 1991, according to Frost, preventing the show from maintaining audience interest. A week after the season's 15th episode placed 85th in the ratings out of 89 shows, ABC put Twin Peaks on indefinite hiatus, a move that usually leads to cancellation.

An organized letter-writing campaign, dubbed COOP (Citizens Opposed to the Offing of Peaks), attempted to save the show from cancellation. The campaign was partly successful, as the season returned to airing on Thursday nights for four weeks from late March. The series then went on another hiatus, before the final two episodes of the season aired back-to-back on June 10.

According to Frost, the main storyline after the resolution of Laura Palmer's murder was planned to be the second strongest element from the first season that audiences responded to: the relationship between Agent Cooper and Audrey Horne. Frost explained that Lara Flynn Boyle, who was romantically involved with Kyle MacLachlan at the time, had effectively vetoed the Audrey–Cooper relationship, forcing the writers to come up with alternative storylines to fill the gap. Sherilyn Fenn corroborated this claim in a 2014 interview, stating: "[Boyle] was mad that my character was getting more attention, so then Kyle started saying that his character shouldn't be with my character because it doesn't look good, 'cause I'm too young... I was not happy about it. It was stupid."

This meant the artificial extension of secondary storylines, such as James Hurley and Evelyn Marsh, to fill in the space. After ratings began to decline, Agent Cooper was given a new love interest, Annie Blackburn (Heather Graham), to replace the writers' intended romance between him and Audrey Horne. Despite ending on a deliberate audience-baiting cliffhanger, the series finale did not sufficiently boost interest, and the show was not renewed for a third season, leaving the cliffhanger unresolved.

Lynch expressed his regret at having resolved the Laura Palmer murder, saying that he and Frost had never intended for the series to answer the question until the very end of the series, after many seasons, and that doing so "killed the goose that laid the golden egg." Lynch blamed network pressure for the decision to resolve the Palmer storyline prematurely. Frost agreed, noting that people at the network had wanted the killer to be revealed by the end of season one. Their statements were corroborated by former ABC executive Bob Iger in his 2019 memoir, The Ride of a Lifetime, where he wrote that after ABC pushed for the killer to be revealed prematurely, there was an immediate decrease in the show's quality.

Looking back, Frost has admitted that he wished he and Lynch had "worked out a smoother transition" between storylines and that the Laura Palmer story was a "tough act to follow". Regarding the second season, Frost felt that "perhaps the storytelling wasn't quite as taut or as fraught with emotion."

=== Prequel film ===
The 1992 film Twin Peaks: Fire Walk with Me, serves as a prequel to the television series. It tells of the investigation into the murder of Teresa Banks, and the last seven days in the life of Laura Palmer. David Lynch and most of the television cast returned for the film, with the notable exceptions of Lara Flynn Boyle, who declined to return as Donna Hayward and was replaced by Moira Kelly, and Sherilyn Fenn due to scheduling conflicts. Kyle MacLachlan returned reluctantly as he wanted to avoid typecasting at the time. As a result, his presence in the film is smaller than originally planned. Lynch shot about five hours of footage that was cut down to two hours and fourteen minutes. The cut footage, which included scenes with characters from the show's original run who were not in the film, was arranged into a 2014 compilation film, Twin Peaks: The Missing Pieces.

Fire Walk with Me polarized critics upon its release, especially in comparison to the widespread acclaim of the series. The film was nominated for the Palme d'Or at the 1992 Cannes Film Festival. It grossed US$1.8 million in 691 theaters on its opening weekend, and went on to gross a total of $4.2 million in North America. The film has developed a cult following over time and been positively reevaluated in the 21st century, and it is now widely regarded as one of Lynch's major works and one of the greatest films of the 1990s.

The release of the third season in 2017, which made many references to the film, led to additional renewed critical and scholarly interest.

=== Influence ===
While the series is not usually described as science fiction, it has been noted to have been influential on that genre.

In 2018, the mayors of Snoqualmie and North Bend, which were both used for filming the series, declared Twin Peaks Day to be held on February 24. That was in recognition of the date mentioned in the first episode of the series.

=== Television industry ===
Writing for The Atlantic in 2016, Mike Mariani wrote that "It would be tough to look at the roster of television shows any given season without finding several that owe a creative debt to Twin Peaks," stating that "Lynch's manipulation of the uncanny, his surreal non-sequiturs, his black humor, and his trademark ominous tracking shots can be felt in a variety of contemporary hit shows."

The X-Files notably takes major inspiration from Twin Peaks, especially in execution of atmosphere and attempts to blend comedic moments and horror. David Duchovny appeared as Denise Bryson in Twin Peaks prior to his role as Fox Mulder on The X-Files. In an interview celebrating the third season, David Chase, the creator of The Sopranos, stated that "Anybody making one-hour drama[s] today who says he wasn't influenced by David Lynch is lying." In 2010, the television series Psych paid tribute to the series by reuniting some of the cast in the fifth-season episode "Dual Spires".

Carlton Cuse, the co-creator of Bates Motel, cited Twin Peaks as a key inspiration for his series, stating, "We pretty much ripped off Twin Peaks." Cuse and Damon Lindelof, who both co-produced Lost, cited both Twin Peaks and David Lynch as a major influence on their work. Lindelof stated "There is no show in television history that had more impact on me than Twin Peaks." Noah Hawley, creator of Fargo and Legion, cited Twin Peaks as a major inspiration on his work, particularly Fargo. Roberto Aguirre-Sacasa, the creator of Riverdale, remarked that "all roads on Riverdale lead back to Twin Peaks" given its thematic similarities.

The TV series Atlanta has been cited by its creator, Donald Glover, as being inspired by the show, labeling it as "Twin Peaks with rappers." Additionally, the animated series Gravity Falls repeatedly referenced the Black Lodge along with other elements of Twin Peaks throughout its run. Critics have also noted similarities and borrowed elements from Lynch's Fire Walk with Me and Twin Peaks in Veena Sud's American adaptation of The Killing. In 2022, Ashley Lyle and Bart Nickerson cited Twin Peaks, as well as Lynch's balance of depth and whimsical elements, as influential for their work on Yellowjackets.

=== Music ===
The show's score, helmed by Angelo Badalamenti, Julee Cruise, and David Lynch, was a notable influence for many genres of music, specifically dream pop. Cruise's compositions inspired the likes of Lana Del Rey and the score of the show was a direct inspiration for dream pop duo Beach House, who have a history of paying homage to the show; the latter's lead singer, Victoria Legrand, was also inspired by the show to write one of the lyrics to their 2010 song "Silver Soul." The show's legacy of honoring dream pop and indie rock compositions is observed in the third season, with its inclusion of performances from contemporaries such as Sharon Van Etten, Nine Inch Nails, and the Veils. The Black Lodge aesthetically inspired Lil Uzi Vert and Young Thug's 2023 music video for "Up". Bands like Bastille have penned songs in honor of the show like "Laura Palmer", which was influenced by the "slightly weird, eerie" atmosphere of the show. Xiu Xiu completed and released a 2017 tribute album titled Plays the Music of Twin Peaks, where they performed several tracks from the show's main soundtrack and leaned into a more experimental sound.

=== Video games ===
Twin Peaks has influenced a number of survival horror and psychological thriller video games, most notably games produced by Sam Lake at Remedy Entertainment, such as the "Remedy Connected Universe" of games, which includes the Alan Wake series, and the game Control. For Alan Wake II, the developers took heavy inspiration specifically from the third season of Twin Peaks. The Remedy-produced Max Payne series also takes inspiration. Other games of the genre that take heavy inspiration include Deadly Premonition, and the Silent Hill series.

Twin Peaks served as an inspiration for the 1993 video game The Legend of Zelda: Link's Awakening, with director Takashi Tezuka citing the series as the main factor for the creation of the "suspicious" characters that populate the game, as well as the mystery elements of the story. The 1998 open world adventure video game Mizzurna Falls was highly reminiscent and an homage to Twin Peaks.

The Velvet Room featured in the Persona video game series is inspired by the Black Lodge, and is also a reference to a previous Lynch film, Blue Velvet. Other games and video game series influenced by Twin Peaks include the Life Is Strange series, and the indie games Disco Elysium, Virginia, Kentucky Route Zero, Thimbleweed Park, and Puzzle Agent.

== Merchandise ==
=== Home media ===
The series was released on VHS in a six-tape collection in April 1995. It did not include the original pilot episode. The series was released on LaserDisc in a sixteen-disc set in 1991 in Japan. The same set was released in the United States across four different volumes from 1993 to 1994. Neither release contained the original pilot or Fire Walk with Me.

In December 2001, the first season (episodes 1–7, minus the pilot) of Twin Peaks was released on DVD in Region 1 by Artisan Entertainment. The box set featured digitally remastered video and was noted for being the first TV series to have its audio track redone in DTS.

The second-season release was postponed several times. The release was originally canceled in 2003 by Artisan due to low sales figures for the season 1 DVD. In April 2007, the second season was released in the United States and Canada, via Paramount Pictures Home Entertainment/CBS DVD.

In October 2007, the broadcast version of the pilot received a legitimate U.S. release as part of the Twin Peaks "Definitive Gold Box Edition". This set includes both U.S. original network broadcast and international versions of the pilot. The set includes all episodes from both seasons, deleted scenes for both seasons, and a feature-length retrospective documentary. Entertainment Weekly gave the box set a "B+" rating and wrote: "There are numerous fascinatingly frank mini-docs here, including interviews with many Peaks participants; together, they offer one of the best available portraits of how a TV hit can go off the rails."

In May 2014, it was announced that the Blu-ray box set containing the complete series of Twin Peaks, the film Fire Walk With Me, and The Missing Pieces, 90 minutes of deleted scenes from the film, would be released in July 2014. In December 2019, Twin Peaks: From Z to A, a 21-disc limited edition Blu-ray box set was released, which includes all the television episodes, Fire Walk with Me, The Missing Pieces, previously released special features, six hours of new behind-the-scenes content, and 4K versions of the original pilot and "Part 8" of season 3. In October 2019, Twin Peaks: The Television Collection was released, a Blu-ray and DVD collection of every season, and all previously released special features.

=== Books, audio and virtual reality ===
During the show's second season, Pocket Books released three official tie-in books, each authored by the show's creators (or their family), which offer a wealth of backstory. The Secret Diary of Laura Palmer, written by Lynch's daughter Jennifer Lynch, is the diary as seen in the series and written by Laura, chronicling her thoughts from her twelfth birthday to the days leading up to her death. Frost's brother Scott wrote The Autobiography of F.B.I. Special Agent Dale Cooper: My Life, My Tapes. Kyle MacLachlan also recorded Diane: The Twin Peaks Tapes of Agent Cooper, which combined audio tracks from various episodes of the series with newly recorded monologues.

Twin Peaks: Visual Soundtrack is a LaserDisc that plays like an elaborate music video. The show's entire soundtrack album is played over silent video footage shot by a Japanese TV crew visiting the Snoqualmie, Washington, locations where the series was shot.

Published in October 2016, The Secret History of Twin Peaks, a novel by series co-creator Mark Frost, "places the unexplained phenomena that unfolded in Twin Peaks in a layered, wide-ranging history, beginning with the journals of Lewis and Clark and ending with the shocking events that closed the finale". In October 2017, Twin Peaks: The Final Dossier was released. A follow-up to The Secret History of Twin Peaks, it was also written by Frost. The novel fills in details of the 25 years between the second and third seasons, and expands on some of the mysteries raised in the new episodes.

In December 2019, Twin Peaks VR was released, a virtual reality game developed by Collider Games and Showtime in collaboration with David Lynch. Players can explore familiar locations while solving puzzles to help Special Agent Cooper and Gordon Cole. The game is available on Oculus Rift, Vive and Valve Index.

== Streaming ==
All three seasons began streaming on Mubi on June 13, 2025. All three seasons are also available on Paramount+, while the first two seasons are available on Pluto TV.

== Future ==
Since the third season ended in 2017, Lynch and Frost had expressed interest in making another season of Twin Peaks. Lynch had been asked in several interviews if he would continue, once saying "I don't know, I have a box of ideas, and I'm working with producer Sabrina S. Sutherland, kind of trying to go through and see if there's any gold in those boxes."

Lynch said one more story was "calling to him" involving the character of Carrie Page. In a Reddit AMA in June 2020, star Kyle MacLachlan said Cooper was his "favorite role of all time" and that he would "absolutely" return to another season "without even seeing the script." Lynch died in January 2025, making the production of any future episodes or any sort of revival of the series unlikely. Several months after Lynch's death, Frost mulled about revisiting the series in book form similar to his previous spin-off works and remarked, "Long ago, with the show, we adopted a policy of never saying never ... That’s still in play, even though David’s not here anymore. I’m open to anything. I just finished my last book, which is coming out next year, so we’ll see."
