= Angelo Badalamenti =

American composer (1937–2022)

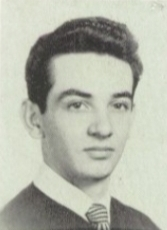
- Badalamenti in 1954

Background information
- Born: Angelo Daniel Badalamenti; March 22, 1937; New York City, New York, U.S.
- Died: December 11, 2022 (aged 85) Lincoln Park, New Jersey, U.S.
- Genres: Film score; jazz; ambient
- Years active: 1962–2022

Angelo Daniel Badalamenti (March 22, 1937 – December 11, 2022) was an American composer and arranger best known for his film music, notably the scores for his collaborations with director David Lynch, including Blue Velvet (1986), Twin Peaks (1990–1991; 2017), Twin Peaks: Fire Walk with Me (1992), The Straight Story (1999), and Mulholland Drive (2001).

Badalamenti also composed scores for such films as National Lampoon's Christmas Vacation (1989), The City of Lost Children (1995), Holy Smoke! (1999), and A Very Long Engagement (2004), and recorded songs with artists including Julee Cruise (in collaboration with Lynch), Nina Simone, Shirley Bassey, Pet Shop Boys, Dusty Springfield, Marianne Faithfull, David Bowie, Tim Booth, Siouxsie Sioux and Dolores O'Riordan.

In 1990, Badalamenti won the Grammy Award for Best Pop Instrumental Performance for his "Twin Peaks Theme" at the 33rd Annual Grammy Awards. He received a lifetime achievement award from the World Soundtrack Awards's Academy in 2008 and the Henry Mancini Award from the American Society of Composers, Authors and Publishers in 2011.

== Early life ==
Angelo Daniel Badalamenti was born on March 22, 1937, in the borough of Brooklyn in New York City, the second of four children born to Leonora (née Ferrari) and John Badalamenti. His father, who was of Italian descent from the town of Cinisi, was a fish market owner. He was raised in Bensonhurst, Brooklyn.

He began taking piano lessons at age eight. By the time Badalamenti was a teenager, his aptitude at the piano earned him a summer job accompanying singers at resorts in the Catskill Mountains. His elder brother was a jazz trumpet player who used to improvise with other musicians. He also went to Latin American dance clubs. Badalamenti attended Lafayette High School, where he wrote the processional march for his high school graduation. After graduating, he enrolled at the Eastman School of Music at the University of Rochester, but transferred after two years to the Manhattan School of Music, where he earned a bachelor's degree in 1958 and a master's degree in 1959. He began composing music pieces in Kurt Weill's style.

== Film and television scoring ==
Badalamenti scored films such as Gordon's War and Law and Disorder, but his break came when he was hired as Isabella Rossellini's singing coach for the song "Blue Velvet" in David Lynch's 1986 film Blue Velvet. Badalamenti and Lynch collaborated to write "Mysteries of Love" using lyrics Lynch wrote. Julee Cruise, who went on to work with Lynch and Badalamenti on other projects, performed the vocals for that track. Badalamenti composed the film's score and served as music supervisor. Lynch's request to him was for the score to be "like Shostakovich, be very Russian, but make it the most beautiful thing but make it dark and a little bit scary". Badalamenti appears in Blue Velvet as the piano player in the club where Rossellini's character performs. This film was the first instance of a career-long collaborative relationship with Lynch spanning television and film. Badalamenti dubbed their partnership "my second-best marriage".

After scoring a variety of mainstream films, including A Nightmare on Elm Street 3: Dream Warriors and National Lampoon's Christmas Vacation, Badalamenti again collaborated with Lynch in scoring Lynch's television show Twin Peaks, featuring Cruise's vocals on the leading song "Falling". Twin Peaks became the score Badalamenti is perhaps best known for, one that helped define the show's style and mood. The score features different themes patterned after specific characters in the show—"Audrey's Dance", for example, is an "abstract jazzy" theme that plays when Audrey Horne (played by Sherilyn Fenn) is onscreen. Many of the songs from the series were released on Cruise's album Floating into the Night. Badalamenti won the Grammy Award for Best Pop Instrumental Performance for the "Twin Peaks Theme" from the Twin Peaks soundtrack. The song also earned a gold plaque from the RIAA. Between 1991 and 1993, Badalamenti and Lynch collaborated on the project Thought Gang, the results of which were released in 2018.

Other Lynch projects Badalamenti worked on include the movies Wild at Heart, Twin Peaks: Fire Walk with Me, Lost Highway, The Straight Story, Mulholland Drive (in which he has a small role as a gangster with a finicky taste for espresso), and Rabbits, and the television shows On the Air and Hotel Room. His projects with other directors include the TV film Witch Hunt and the films Naked in New York, The City of Lost Children, A Very Long Engagement, The Wicker Man, Dark Water, and Secretary. He also worked on the soundtrack for the video game Fahrenheit (known as Indigo Prophecy in North America) and wrote the music for Paul Schrader's films Auto Focus, The Comfort of Strangers, and Dominion: Prequel to the Exorcist.

In 1995, he asked Marianne Faithfull to write lyrics for a song for the soundtrack of Jean-Pierre Jeunet's The City of Lost Children; the result was "Who Will Take My Dreams Away".

In 1998, Badalamenti recorded "A Foggy Day (in London Town)" with David Bowie for the Red Hot Organization's compilation album Red Hot + Rhapsody, a tribute to George Gershwin that raised money for various charities devoted to increasing AIDS awareness and fighting the disease. Badalamenti had sent a demo of the song with his own vocals to the record company and Bowie was the first singer to respond. In 1999, he worked with director Jane Campion on the film Holy Smoke!, writing the soundtrack after working with Campion for a few days.

In 2005, he composed the themes for the movie Napola (Before the Fall), which were then adapted for the score by Normand Corbeil. In 2008, he composed and directed the soundtrack of The Edge of Love: Siouxsie Sioux sang the Weill-influenced "Careless Love", and Patrick Wolf and Beth Rowley recorded vocals for several other tracks.

Badalamenti received the Lifetime Achievement Award at the World Soundtrack Awards on October 18, 2008, in Ghent, Belgium. That night, he performed a concert at the piano with the Brussels Philharmonic orchestra directed by Dirk Brossé, with Siouxsie Sioux and Beth Rowley on vocals. The concert, spanning his whole career with a selection of tracks, was broadcast on Belgian television.

On July 23, 2011, the American Society of Composers, Authors and Publishers gave Badalamenti the Henry Mancini Award for his accomplishments in film and television music.

The 2017 revival of the Twin Peaks television series marked the continuation of Badalamenti's work with Lynch. Its score features new compositions by Badalamenti as well as material from the original score.

== Collaborations ==
From the start, Badalamenti collaborated with other songwriters. In 1964, he contributed to Beatlemania by arranging, conducting, and co-writing the Christmas novelty single "Santa, Bring Me Ringo", which was performed by Christine Hunter. In 1966, he co-wrote the song "Visa to the Stars" on Perrey and Kingsley's album The In Sound from Way Out! In 1967, using the name Andy Badale, he co-wrote the song "Pioneers of the Stars" for Perrey and Kingsley's album Kaleidoscopic Vibrations: Electronic Pop Music From Way Out. The same year, he and Norm Simon co-wrote "I Want to Love You for What You Are", a No. 54 pop hit for Ronnie Dove. He also arranged, produced, and co-wrote some songs on Perrey's two solo albums for Vanguard Records using the Badale pseudonym.

Badalamenti also wrote songs for Nina Simone and Shirley Bassey. In 1967, he co-wrote the song "I Hold No Grudge" for Simone's album High Priestess of Soul. In 1968, he and Sammy Cahn wrote "I've Been Loved" for Bassey's album This Is My Life.

In 1987, he lent his services to the British synth-pop duo Pet Shop Boys, orchestrating "It Couldn't Happen Here". He also arranged the strings on two tracks from their 1990 album Behaviour.

Badalamenti arranged songs for artists such as Dusty Springfield and Paul McCartney. In 1989 he arranged Springfield's single "Nothing Has Been Proved", which was written by the Pet Shop Boys.

Badalementi conceived entire albums with singers such as Julee Cruise, Marianne Faithfull and Tim Booth of the band James. In 1993, he and Lynch directed an album for Cruise, The Voice of Love, which included several tracks from Twin Peaks. Also in 1993, he collaborated with thrash metal band Anthrax on the Twin Peaks-inspired track "Black Lodge" from the album Sound of White Noise.

In 1995, Badalamenti composed, orchestrated, and produced Faithfull's album A Secret Life. In 1996, he teamed up with Tim Booth as Booth and the Bad Angel; they released their eponymous album on the Mercury label. In 2000, he worked with Orbital on the single "Beached" for the movie The Beach. In 2004, he composed the Evilenko soundtrack, working with Dolores O'Riordan, who sang the main theme and with whom he continued to collaborate.

== Other projects ==
Badalamenti composed some of the score for the opening ceremony of the 1992 Summer Olympics in Barcelona.

== Live performances ==
In April of 2009, Badalamenti performed at Change Begins Within, a benefits concert hosted by the David Lynch Foundation, headlined by Paul McCartney. The performance was held at the Radio City Music Hall and included Eddie Vedder, Sheryl Crowe and Ringo Starr, among others.

Badalamenti performed at a concert entitled "The Music of David Lynch" in 2015, in recognition of the tenth anniversary of the David Lynch Foundation. The performance was held at Ace Hotel Los Angeles and included Julee Cruise and other artists known for collaborating with Lynch.

== Personal life ==
Badalamenti and his wife, Lonny, married in 1968 and had two children. He died of natural causes at his home in Lincoln Park, New Jersey, on December 11, 2022, at age 85. Following his death, several industry figures paid tribute to Badalamenti. David Lynch, during his daily installment of Weather Report on December 12, said: "Today—no music".

== Awards ==
- 1990: Grammy Award for Best Pop Instrumental Performance: "Twin Peaks Theme"
- 1993: Saturn Award for Best Music: Twin Peaks: Fire Walk with Me
- 2008: World Soundtrack Awards: Lifetime Achievement Award
- 2011: American Society of Composers, Authors and Publishers: Henry Mancini Award

== See also ==
- List of noted film producer and composer collaborations
