= David Lynch =

American filmmaker (1946–2025)

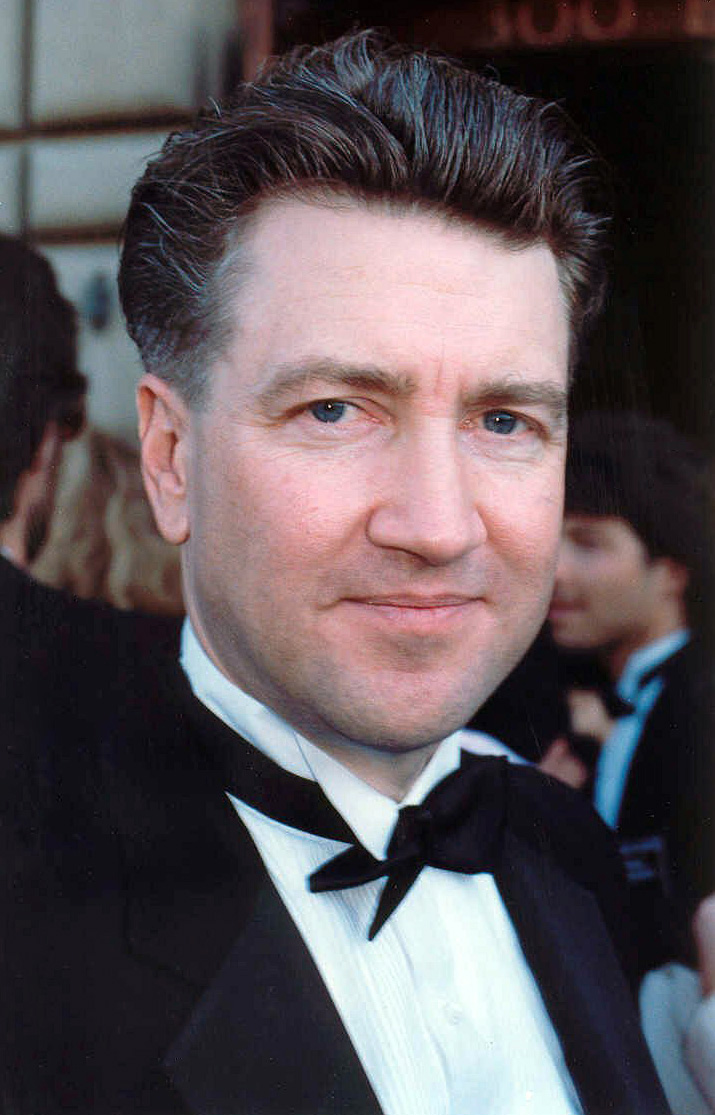
- Lynch in 1990
- Born: David Keith Lynch; January 20, 1946; Missoula, Montana, U.S.
- Died: January 16, 2025 (aged 78); Los Angeles, California, U.S.
- Resting place: Hollywood Forever Cemetery
- Other name: Judas Booth
- Occupations: Director; producer; screenwriter; actor; painter; visual artist; musician
- Years active: 1967–2025
- Works: Filmography; unrealized projects; discography
- Style: Surrealism; mystery; neo-noir; horror; thriller; arthouse; experimental
- Spouses: Peggy Reavey (m. 1968; div. 1974) Mary Fisk (m. 1977; div. 1987) Mary Sweeney (m. 2006; div. 2007) Emily Stofle (m. 2009; sep. 2023)
- Partner: Isabella Rossellini (1986–1991)
- Children: 4, including Jennifer
- Awards: Full list
- David Lynch's voice Lynch's voice from a 1982 introduction to Eraserhead (1977). David Lynch - Nuart Theatre trailer for Eraserhead.ogg

David Keith Lynch (January 20, 1946 – January 16, 2025) was an American filmmaker and artist. He is widely regarded as one of the greatest and most influential filmmakers in the history of cinema, (Note: Attributed to multiple sources.) with his films often characterized by a distinctive surrealist sensibility that gave rise to the adjective "Lynchian". In a career spanning more than five decades, he received numerous accolades, including an Academy Honorary Award, a Palme d'Or and Best Director Award at the Cannes Film Festival, the Golden Lion for Lifetime Achievement at the Venice Film Festival, an Independent Spirit Award, a Saturn Award, two César Awards, and a (posthumous) Laurel Award for Screenwriting Achievement, in addition to nominations for four Academy Awards, two British Academy Film Awards, four Golden Globe Awards, and nine Primetime Emmy Awards.

Initially aspiring to become a painter, Lynch began creating short films out of a desire to effect movement in his paintings. He made his feature film debut with the surrealist body horror film Eraserhead (1977), which took him five years to make due to financial issues and slowly found success as a midnight movie. He garnered critical acclaim for the biographical drama film The Elephant Man (1980) and the neo-noir mystery films Blue Velvet (1986) and Mulholland Drive (2001), all three of which earned him nominations for the Academy Award for Best Director. His romantic crime drama film Wild at Heart (1990) won the Palme d'Or at the Cannes Film Festival. He also directed the neo-noir horror film Lost Highway (1997), the comedy-drama film The Straight Story (1999), and the experimental psychological horror film Inland Empire (2006), his last feature film. He wrote and directed the space opera film Dune (1984) but disowned it after extensive studio interference.

Lynch co-created (with Mark Frost) and directed the ABC surrealist horror-mystery series Twin Peaks (1990–1991; 2017), for which he received nine Primetime Emmy Award nominations. The series is considered a landmark turning point in television and often listed among the greatest television series of all time. (Note: Attributed to multiple sources.) He also co-wrote (with Robert Engels) and directed its film prequel Twin Peaks: Fire Walk with Me (1992). He directed music videos for Donovan, Interpol, Chris Isaak, X Japan, Moby, and Nine Inch Nails, and commercials for Dior, Gucci, Yves Saint Laurent, Jil Sander, Calvin Klein, the PlayStation 2, and the New York City Department of Sanitation. His acting roles included Gordon Cole on Twin Peaks, the voice of Gus on the animated sitcom The Cleveland Show (2010–2013), Jack Dahl on the sitcom Louie (2012), Howard in the drama film Lucky (2017), and film director John Ford in Steven Spielberg's drama film The Fabelmans (2022).

Lynch also worked as an animator, author, cartoonist, furniture designer, musician, sound designer, editor, photographer, and sculptor. A longtime practitioner of Transcendental Meditation, he founded the David Lynch Foundation to fund meditation lessons for at-risk populations. Lynch was a lifelong chain smoker whose emphysema was exacerbated when he was evacuated from his home in Los Angeles due to the January 2025 Southern California wildfires. He died at his daughter Jennifer's home soon thereafter.

== Early life and education ==
My childhood was elegant homes, tree-lined streets, the milkman, building backyard forts, droning airplanes, blue skies, picket fences, green grass, cherry trees. Middle America as it's supposed to be. But on the cherry tree there's this pitch oozing out—some black, some yellow, and millions of red ants crawling all over it. I discovered that if one looks a little closer at this beautiful world, there are always red ants underneath. Because I grew up in a perfect world, other things were a contrast.

— Lynch on his childhood

David Keith Lynch was born at St. Patrick's Hospital in Missoula, Montana, on January 20, 1946 to English-language tutor Edwina "Sunny" Lynch (née Sundholm) and USDA research scientist Donald Walton Lynch. Two of his mother's grandparents were Swedish-speaking Finns who settled in the U.S. in the 19th century. Lynch was also of German descent through his mother, as well as of English, Irish and Scottish descent through his father. He recalled of his father, "He would drive me through the woods in his green Forest Service truck, over dirt roads, through the most beautiful forests where the trees are very tall and shafts of sunlight come down and in the mountain streams the rainbow trout leap out and their little trout sides catch glimpses of light. Then my father would drop me in the woods and go off. It was a weird, comforting feeling being in the woods." He was raised Presbyterian.

The family often moved around according to where the USDA assigned Lynch's father. When Lynch was two months old, they moved to Sandpoint, Idaho, where his brother John was born two years later; they then moved to Spokane, Washington, where his sister Martha was born. The family subsequently lived in Durham, North Carolina; Boise, Idaho; and Alexandria, Virginia. Lynch adjusted to this transitory early life with relative ease, noting that he usually had no difficulty making friends when he attended a new school.

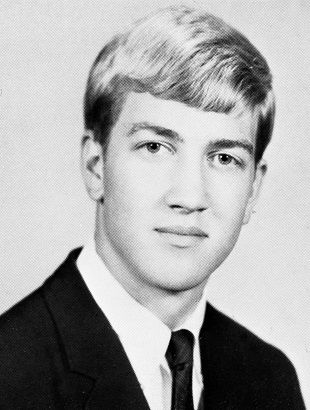
Lynch's high school senior portrait, 1964

Lynch said of his early life, "I found the world completely and totally fantastic as a child. Of course, I had the usual fears, like going to school ... for me, back then, school was a crime against young people. It destroyed the seeds of liberty. The teachers didn't encourage knowledge or a positive attitude." He joined the Boy Scouts, and despite later saying that he joined only so he "could quit and put it behind me", he rose to the highest rank of Eagle Scout. He befriended Toby Keeler, whose father Bushnell was a painter. Bushnell gave Lynch a copy of Robert Henri's book The Art Spirit (1923), which inspired Lynch to dedicate himself to "the art life".

At Francis C. Hammond High School in Alexandria, Lynch did not excel academically and had little interest in schoolwork, but was popular with other students. After leaving, he decided that he wanted to study painting in college, which he began at the Corcoran School of the Arts and Design in Washington, D.C. In 1964, he transferred to the School of the Museum of Fine Arts in Boston, where his roommate was future musician Peter Wolf. He dropped out after a year, later saying he "was not inspired at all in that place". He then traveled around Europe with his friend Jack Fisk, who was similarly unhappy with his studies; the two hoped to train at the school of Austrian painter Oskar Kokoschka. But upon reaching Salzburg, they found that Kokoschka was not available; having planned to spend three years in Europe, they found themselves disillusioned and returned to the U.S. after just two weeks.

== Career ==
=== 1967–1977: Early career and feature debut ===
Back in the United States, Lynch returned to Virginia. Because his parents had moved to Walnut Creek, California, he stayed with his friend Toby Keeler for a while. He decided to move to Philadelphia and enroll at the Pennsylvania Academy of the Fine Arts, after advice from Fisk, who was already enrolled there. He preferred this college to his previous school in Boston, saying, "In Philadelphia there were great and serious painters, and everybody was inspiring one another and it was a beautiful time there." He recalled that Philadelphia had "a great mood—factories, smoke, railroads, diners, the strangest characters and the darkest night. I saw vivid images—plastic curtains held together with Band-Aids, rags stuffed in broken windows." He was influenced by the Irish painter Francis Bacon. In Philadelphia, Lynch began a relationship with a fellow student, Peggy Reavey, whom he married in 1967. The next year, their daughter Jennifer was born. Peggy later said Lynch "definitely was a reluctant father, but a very loving one. Hey, I was pregnant when we got married. We were both reluctant." As a family, they moved to Philadelphia's Fairmount neighborhood, where they bought a 12-room house for the relatively low price of $3,500 (equivalent to $33,800 in 2025) due to the area's high crime and poverty rates. Lynch later said:

We lived cheap, but the city was full of fear. A kid was shot to death down the street ... We were robbed twice, had windows shot out and a car stolen. The house was first broken into only three days after we moved in ... The feeling was so close to extreme danger, and the fear was so intense. There was violence and hate and filth. But the biggest influence in my whole life was that city.

Meanwhile, to help support his family, Lynch took a job printing engravings. At the Pennsylvania Academy, Lynch made his first short film, Six Men Getting Sick (Six Times) (1967). He had first come up with the idea when he developed a wish to see his paintings move, and he began discussing creating animation with an artist named Bruce Samuelson. When this project never came about, Lynch decided to work on a film alone and purchased the cheapest 16mm camera he could find. Taking one of the academy's abandoned upper rooms as a workspace, he spent $150, which at the time he felt was a lot of money, to produce Six Men Getting Sick. Calling the film "57 seconds of growth and fire, and three seconds of vomit", Lynch played it on a loop at the academy's annual end-of-year exhibit, where it shared joint-first prize with a painting by Noel Mahaffey. This led to a commission from one of his fellow students, the wealthy H. Barton Wasserman, who offered him $1,000 (equivalent to $9,300 in 2025) to create a film installation in his home. Spending $478 of that on the second-hand Bolex camera "of [his] dreams", Lynch produced a new animated short but, upon getting the film developed, realized that the result was a blurred, frameless print. He later said, "So I called up [Wasserman] and said, 'Bart, the film is a disaster. The camera was broken and what I've done hasn't turned out.' And he said, 'Don't worry, David, take the rest of the money and make something else for me. Just give me a print.' End of story."

With his leftover money, Lynch decided to experiment with a mix of animation and live action, producing the four-minute short The Alphabet (1968). The film starred Lynch's wife Peggy as a character known as The Girl, who chants the alphabet to a series of images of horses before dying at the end by hemorrhaging blood all over her bed sheets. Adding a sound effect, Lynch used a broken Uher tape recorder to record the sound of Jennifer crying, creating a distorted sound that Lynch found particularly effective. Later describing what had inspired him, Lynch said, "Peggy's niece was having a bad dream one night and was saying the alphabet in her sleep in a tormented way. So that's sort of what started 'The Alphabet' going. The rest of it was just subconscious."

Learning about the newly founded American Film Institute, which gave grants to filmmakers who could support their application with a prior work and a script for a new project, Lynch decided to submit a copy of The Alphabet along with a script he had written for a new short film, The Grandmother, that would be almost entirely live action. The institute agreed to help finance the work, initially offering him $5,000 out of his requested budget of $7,200, but later granting him the additional $2,200. Starring people he knew from both work and college and filmed in his own house, The Grandmother featured a neglected boy who "grows" a grandmother from a seed to care for him. The film critics Michelle Le Blanc and Colin Odell wrote, "this film is a true oddity but contains many of the themes and ideas that would filter into his later work, and shows a remarkable grasp of the medium".

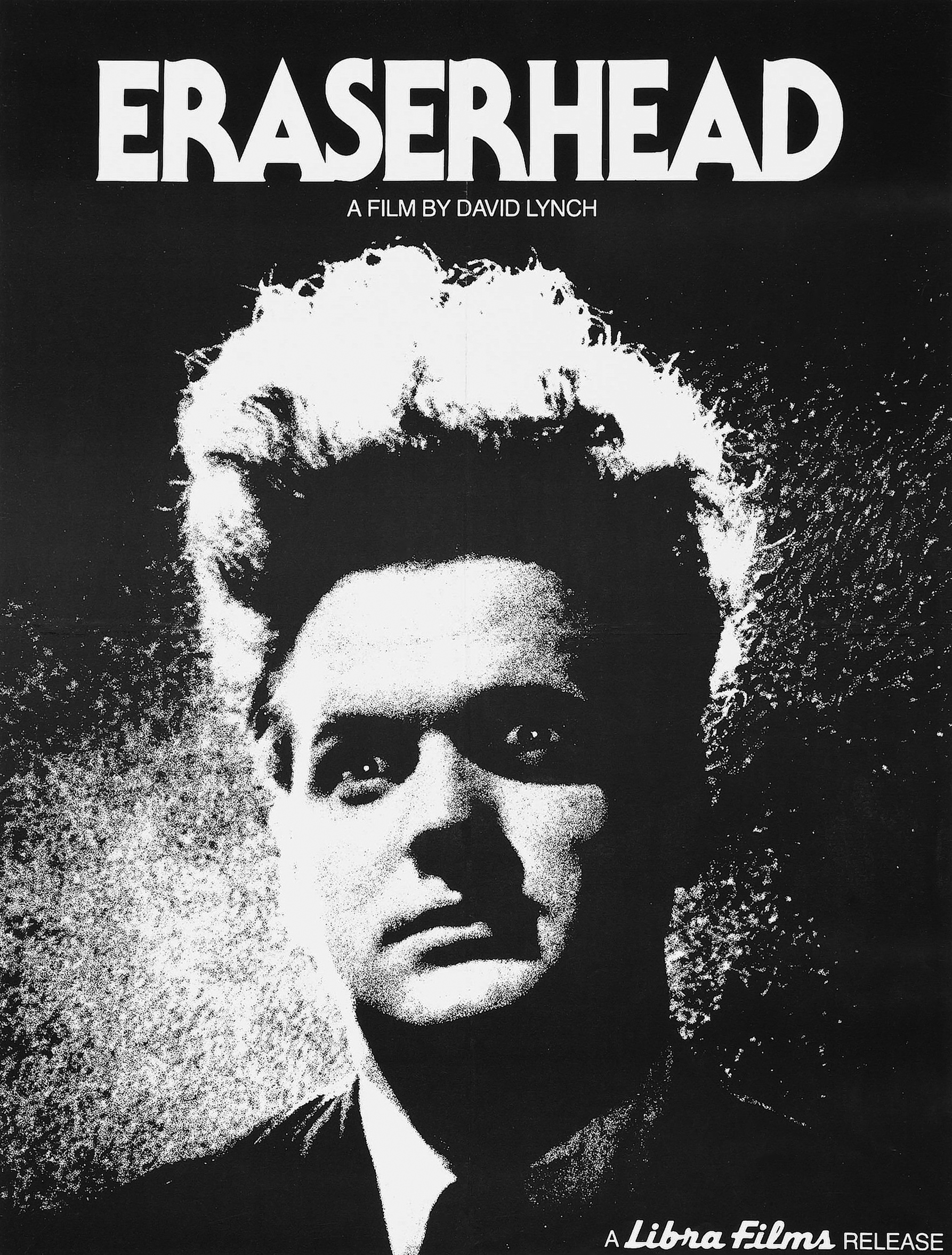
Theatrical release poster for Eraserhead (1977)

Lynch left the Pennsylvania Academy of the Fine Arts after three semesters and in 1970 moved with his wife and daughter to Los Angeles, where he began studying filmmaking at the AFI Conservatory, a place he later called "completely chaotic and disorganized, which was great ... you quickly learned that if you were going to get something done, you would have to do it yourself. They wanted to let people do their thing." He began writing a script for a proposed work, Gardenback, that had "unfolded from this painting I'd done". In this venture he was supported by a number of figures at the Conservatory, who encouraged him to lengthen the script and add more dialogue, which he reluctantly agreed to do. All the interference on his Gardenback project made him fed up with the Conservatory and led him to quit after returning to start his second year and being put in first-year classes. AFI dean Frank Daniel asked Lynch to reconsider, believing that he was one of the school's best students. Lynch agreed on the condition that he could create a project that would not be interfered with. Feeling that Gardenback was "wrecked", he set out on a new film, Eraserhead.

Eraserhead was planned to be about 42 minutes long (it ended up being 89 minutes), its script was only 21 pages, and Lynch was able to create the film without interference. He recalled its origin: "My original image was of a man's head bouncing on the ground, being picked up by a boy and taken to a pencil factory. I don't know where it came from." Filming began on May 29, 1972, at night in some abandoned stables, allowing the production team (which was largely Lynch and some of his friends, including Sissy Spacek, Jack Fisk, cinematographer Frederick Elmes, and sound designer Alan Splet) to set up a camera room, green room, editing room, sets, as well as a food room and a bathroom. The AFI gave Lynch a $10,000 grant, but it was not enough to complete the film, and under pressure from studios after the success of the relatively cheap feature film Easy Rider, it was unable to give him more. Lynch was then supported by a loan from his father and money that he earned from a paper route that he took up, delivering The Wall Street Journal. Not long into Eraserhead's production, Lynch and Peggy amicably separated and divorced, and he began living full-time on set. In 1977, Lynch married Jack Fisk's sister Mary Fisk. In 1973, Lynch's sister suggested he try Transcendental Meditation. It proved a revelation, and Lynch said he had never "missed a session since: twenty minutes, twice a day."

Due to financial problems, the filming of Eraserhead was haphazard, regularly stopping and starting again. During one such break in 1974, Lynch made The Amputee, a one-shot film about two minutes long. He proposed that he make The Amputee to present to AFI to test two different types of film stock.

Eraserhead was finally finished in 1976. Lynch said that not a single reviewer of the film understood it as he intended. Filmed in black and white, Eraserhead tells the story of Henry (Jack Nance), a quiet young man, living in a dystopian industrial wasteland, whose girlfriend gives birth to a deformed baby whom she leaves in his care. It was heavily influenced by the fearful mood of Philadelphia, and Lynch has called it "my Philadelphia Story". Lynch tried to get it entered into the Cannes Film Festival, but while some reviewers liked it, others felt it was awful, and it was not selected for screening. Reviewers from the New York Film Festival also rejected it, but it screened at the Los Angeles Film Festival, where Ben Barenholtz, the distributor of the Elgin Theater, heard about it. Barenholtz was very supportive of the movie, helping to distribute it around the United States in 1977. Eraserhead subsequently became popular on the midnight movie underground circuit, and was later called one of the most important midnight movies of the 1970s, along with Night of the Living Dead, El Topo, Pink Flamingos, The Rocky Horror Picture Show, and The Harder They Come. Stanley Kubrick said it was one of his all-time favorite films.

=== 1978–1986: Stardom and acclaim ===
After Eraserhead's success on the underground circuit, Stuart Cornfeld, an executive producer for Mel Brooks, saw it and recalled, "I was just 100 percent blown away [...] I thought it was the greatest thing I'd ever seen. It was such a cleansing experience." Brooks viewed Eraserhead, and after exiting the screening theater, embraced Lynch, declaring, "You're a madman! I love you! You're in."

Cornfeld agreed to help Lynch with his next film, Ronnie Rocket, for which Lynch had already written a script. But Lynch soon realized that Ronnie Rocket, a film that he said is about "electricity and a three-foot guy with red hair", was not going to be picked up by any financiers, and so he asked Cornfeld to find him a script by someone else that he could direct. Cornfeld found four. On hearing the title of the first, The Elephant Man, Lynch chose it. The Elephant Man's script, by Chris de Vore and Eric Bergren, is based on the true story of Joseph Merrick, a severely deformed man in Victorian London, who was held in a sideshow but later taken under the care of a London surgeon, Frederick Treves. Lynch wanted to make some alterations that would deviate from real events but in his view make a better plot, but he needed the permission of Brooks, whose company, Brooksfilms, was responsible for production. The film stars John Hurt as John Merrick (the name changed from Joseph) and Anthony Hopkins as Treves. Filming took place in London. Though surrealistic and in black and white, it has been called "one of the most conventional" of Lynch's films. It was a critical and commercial success, earning eight Academy Award nominations, including Best Director and Best Adapted Screenplay.

After The Elephant Man's success, George Lucas, a fan of Eraserhead, offered Lynch the opportunity to direct the third film in his original Star Wars trilogy, Return of the Jedi. Lynch declined, saying that he had "next door to zero interest" and arguing that Lucas should direct the film himself as the movie should reflect his own vision, not Lynch's. Soon, the opportunity to direct another big-budget science fiction epic arose when Dino de Laurentiis asked Lynch to create a film adaptation of Frank Herbert's novel Dune (1965). Lynch agreed, and in doing so was also contractually obliged to produce two other works for the De Laurentiis Entertainment Group. He began writing a script based on the novel, initially with both de Vore and Bergren, and then alone when De Laurentiis was unhappy with their ideas. Lynch also helped build some of the sets, attempting to create "a certain look", and particularly enjoyed building the set for the oil planet Giedi Prime, for which he used "steel, bolts, and porcelain".

Dune is set in the far future, when humans live in an interstellar empire under a feudal system. The main character, Paul Atreides (Kyle MacLachlan), is the son of a nobleman who takes control of the desert planet Arrakis, which grows the rare spice melange, the empire's most highly prized commodity. Lynch was unhappy with the work, later saying: "Dune was a kind of studio film. I didn't have final cut. And, little by little, I was subconsciously making compromises". Much of his footage was removed from the final theatrical cut, dramatically condensing the plot. Although De Laurentiis hoped it would be as successful as Star Wars, Dune (1984) was a critical and commercial dud; it had cost $45 million to make, and grossed $27.4 million domestically. Later, Universal Studios released an "extended cut" for syndicated television, containing almost an hour of cutting-room-floor footage and new narration. It did not represent Lynch's intentions, but the studio considered it more comprehensible than the original version. Lynch objected to the changes and had his name struck from the extended cut, which has Alan Smithee credited as the director and "Judas Booth" (a pseudonym Lynch invented, reflecting his feelings of betrayal) as the screenwriter.

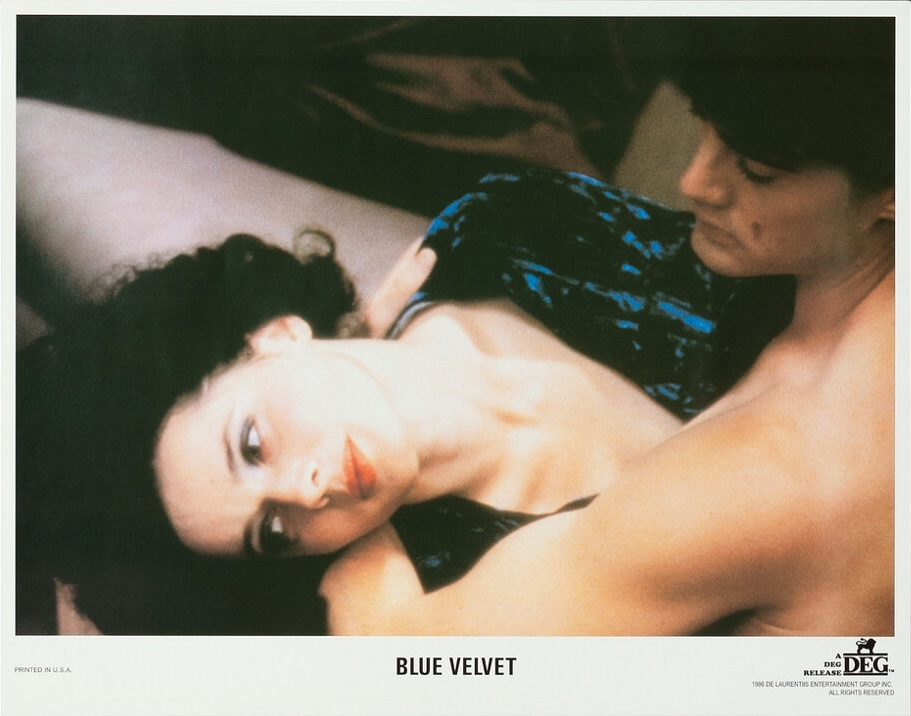
Isabella Rossellini and Kyle MacLachlan in a publicity still for Blue Velvet (1986).

Lynch was still contractually obligated to produce two other projects for De Laurentiis, the first a planned sequel to Dune, which due to the film's failure never went beyond the script stage. The other was a more personal work, based on a script Lynch had been working on for some time. Developing from ideas that Lynch had had since 1973, Blue Velvet was set in Lumberton, North Carolina, and revolves around a college student, Jeffrey Beaumont (MacLachlan), who finds a severed ear in a field. Investigating with the help of his friend Sandy (Laura Dern), Jeffrey discovers a criminal gang led by psychopath Frank Booth (Dennis Hopper), who has kidnapped the husband and child of singer Dorothy Vallens (Isabella Rossellini) and repeatedly rapes her. Lynch called the story "a dream of strange desires wrapped inside a mystery story". Lynch included 1960s pop songs, including Roy Orbison's "In Dreams" and Bobby Vinton's "Blue Velvet", the latter of which largely inspired the film. Lynch said, "It was the song that sparked the movie ... There was something mysterious about it. It made me think about things. And the first things I thought about were lawns—lawns and the neighborhood." Other music for the film is by Angelo Badalamenti, who scored most of Lynch's subsequent work.

De Laurentiis loved the film, and it received support at some of the early specialist screenings, but the preview screenings to mainstream audiences were very poorly received. The film was controversial; Roger Ebert wrote that Rossellini "is asked to do things in this film that require real nerve … She is degraded, slapped around, humiliated and undressed in front of the camera." Rossellini responded: "I was an adult. I was 31 or 32. I chose to play the character ... I think my character was the first time we did an abused woman, a portrait of an abused woman, but also she camouflaged herself behind what she was asked to be, which was sexy and beautiful and singing, and she obeys the order, and is also victimized it. That's the complexity of Blue Velvet but also the great talent of David Lynch. I thought he did a fantastic film. I love Blue Velvet."

Blue Velvet was a critical and commercial success, winning the National Society of Film Critics Award for Best Film and earning Lynch his second Academy Award nomination for Best Director. David Thomson recalls seeing it for the first time: "The occasion stood as the last moment of transcendence I had felt at the movies—until The Piano. What I mean by that is a kind of passionate involvement with both the story and the making of a film, so that I was simultaneously moved by the enactment on the screen and by discovering that a new director had made the medium alive and dangerous again." Pauline Kael praised Lynch as a "genius naïf" and predicted that he "might turn out to be the first populist surrealist—a Frank Capra of dream logic." She quoted a moviegoer as saying "Maybe I'm sick, but I want to see that again."

=== 1987–1997: Established career ===
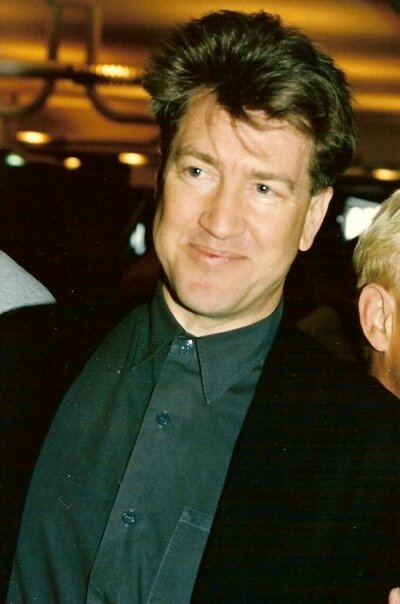
Lynch at the 1990 Cannes Film Festival

Lynch met television producer Mark Frost and they started working together on a biopic of Marilyn Monroe based on Anthony Summers's book The Goddess: The Secret Lives of Marilyn Monroe, but it never got off the ground. While talking in a coffee shop, Lynch and Frost had the idea of a corpse washing up on a lakeshore, and went to work on their third project, first called Northwest Passage and then Twin Peaks (1990–1991). A drama set in an eponymous small Washington town where popular high school student Laura Palmer (Sheryl Lee) has been murdered, Twin Peaks featured FBI agent Dale Cooper (MacLachlan) as the investigator trying to solve the crime and discovering many of the townsfolk's secrets along the way; Lynch said, "The project was to mix a police investigation with the ordinary lives of the characters [...] [Mark Frost and I] worked together, especially in the initial stages. Later on we started working more apart." They pitched the series to ABC, which agreed to finance the pilot and eventually commissioned a season comprising seven episodes. Richard Corliss wrote: "Long before the series' April premiere, ecstatic critics were priming TV viewers to expect the unexpected. Lynch's two-hour pilot didn't disappoint. It was frantic and lugubrious in turn, a soap opera with strychnine. In one night, the show had hip America hooked."

Lynch directed two of the first season's seven episodes and carefully chose the other episodes' directors. He also appeared in several episodes as FBI agent Gordon Cole. The series was a success, with high ratings in the U.S. and many other countries, and soon had a cult following. Lynch received nine Primetime Emmy Award nominations for the show. A second season of 22 episodes went into production, but ABC executives believed that public interest in the show was declining. The network insisted that Lynch and Frost reveal the identity of Laura's killer prematurely, which Lynch grudgingly agreed to do, in what he later called one of his biggest professional regrets. After identifying the murderer and moving from Thursday to Saturday night, Twin Peaks continued for several more episodes, but was canceled after a ratings drop. Lynch, who disliked the direction that writers and directors took in the later episodes, directed the final episode. He ended it with a cliffhanger, of which he later said, "That's not the ending. That's the ending that people were stuck with."

Meanwhile, Lynch created commercials for companies including Giorgio Armani, Calvin Klein, and Yves Saint Laurent. He directed a commercial for Japanese coffee company Namoi in which a Japanese man searches the town of Twin Peaks for his missing wife. Twin Peaks had unexpectedly become popular in Japan; mock funerals were held for Laura, Japanese tourists traveled to the U.S. solely to visit various filming locations around Snoqualmie, and MacLachlan reprised his role as Dale (noted in the show for his love of coffee) in a four-part series of commercials for Japanese coffee company Georgia.

1990 was Lynch's annus mirabilis: Wild at Heart won the Palme d'Or at Cannes, and the television series Twin Peaks was proving a smash hit with audiences across the world. The musical/performance piece Industrial Symphony No. 1, which Lynch had staged with Angelo Badalamenti at the Brooklyn Academy of music, had spawned the album Floating into the Night and launched singer Julee Cruise. Five one-man exhibitions between 1989 and 1991 emphasized Lynch's roots in fine art and painting, and a rash of ads (including a teaser trailer for Michael Jackson's 'Dangerous' tour) confirmed the demand for the Lynch touch ... In an unlikely scenario for the maker of Eraserhead, Lynch had become an influential and fashionable brand name.

— Christopher Rodley

While Lynch was working on the first few episodes of Twin Peaks, his friend Monty Montgomery "gave me a book that he wanted to direct as a movie. He asked if I would maybe be executive producer or something, and I said 'That's great, Monty, but what if I read it and fall in love with it and want to do it myself?' And he said, 'In that case, you can do it yourself'." The book was Barry Gifford's novel Wild at Heart: The Story of Sailor and Lula, about two lovers on a road trip. Lynch felt that it was "just exactly the right thing at the right time. The book and the violence in America merged in my mind and many different things happened." With Gifford's support, Lynch adapted the novel into Wild at Heart, a crime and road movie starring Nicolas Cage as Sailor and Laura Dern as Lula. Calling its plot a "strange blend" of "a road picture, a love story, a psychological drama and a violent comedy", Lynch departed substantially from the novel, changing the ending and incorporating numerous references to The Wizard of Oz. Corliss wrote: "Wild at Heart, which sends a pair of loser lovers (Nicolas Cage and Laura Dern) on a trip into the dark night of the Southern Gothic soul, is a tonic for the senses and an assault on the sensibilities. Heads splatter, skulls explode, biker punks torture folks for the sheer heck of it, and a pair of loopy innocents find excitement in a side trip to hell. Pretty much like Blue Velvet. Yes, it's different, but the same kind of different; Lynch could no longer shock by being shocking. Many critics figured they had solved the mystery of his visual style and thematic preoccupations. Next mystery, please. By August, when the film opened in the U.S., the Lynch mob was more like a lynch mob." Despite a muted response from American critics and viewers, Wild at Heart won the Palme d'Or at the 1990 Cannes Film Festival. When it won the prize, audience members booed Lynch and the film.

After Wild at Heart's success, Lynch returned to the world of the canceled Twin Peaks, this time without Frost, to make a film that was primarily a prequel but also in part a sequel. Lynch said, "I liked the idea of the story going back and forth in time." The result, Twin Peaks: Fire Walk with Me (1992), primarily revolved around the last few days of Laura Palmer's life, was much "darker" in tone than the TV series, with much of the humor removed, and dealt with such topics as incest and murder. Lynch has said the film is about "the loneliness, shame, guilt, confusion and devastation of the victim of incest". The company CIBY-2000 financed Twin Peaks: Fire Walk with Me, and most of the TV series's cast reprised their roles, though some refused and many were unenthusiastic about the project. The film was a commercial failure in the U.S. at the time of its release, but has since experienced a critical reappraisal. Many critics, such as Mark Kermode, have called it Lynch's "masterpiece".

Meanwhile, Lynch worked on some new television shows. He and Frost created the comedy series On the Air (1992), which was canceled after three episodes aired, and he and Montgomery created the three-episode HBO miniseries Hotel Room (1993) about events that happen in one hotel room on different dates.

In 1993, Lynch collaborated with Japanese musician Yoshiki on the video for X Japan's song "Longing ~Setsubou no Yoru~". The video was never officially released, but Lynch wrote in his 2018 memoir Room to Dream that "some of the frames are so fuckin' beautiful, you can't believe it."

After his unsuccessful TV ventures, Lynch returned to film. In 1997, he released the non-linear noiresque Lost Highway, which was co-written by Barry Gifford and stars Bill Pullman and Patricia Arquette. The film failed commercially and received a mixed response from critics.

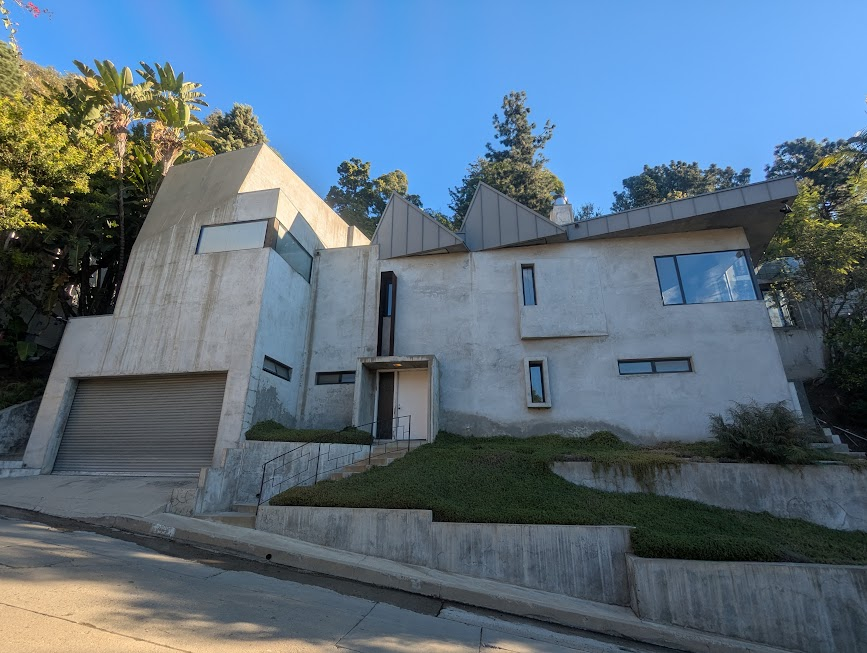
Lynch purchased several properties in the Hollywood Hills, subsequently forming the David Lynch Compound, in the early 1990s. The site became his primary residence; it housed an editing bay, recording studio, and was the filming location for several of his films.

Lynch then began work on a film from a script by Mary Sweeney and John E. Roach, The Straight Story, based on the true story of Alvin Straight (Richard Farnsworth), an elderly man from Laurens, Iowa, who goes on a 300-mile journey to visit his sick brother (Harry Dean Stanton) in Mount Zion, Wisconsin, by riding lawnmower. Asked why he chose this script, Lynch said, "that's what I fell in love with next", and expressed his admiration of Straight, describing him as "like James Dean, except he's old". Badalamenti scored the film, calling it "very different from the kind of score he's done for [Lynch] in the past".

=== 1998–2009: Continued work ===
Among the many differences from Lynch's other films, The Straight Story contains no profanity, sex, or violence, and is rated G (general viewing) by the Motion Picture Association of America, which came as "shocking news" to many in the film industry, who were surprised that it "did not disturb, offend or mystify". Le Blanc and Odell write that the plot made it "seem as far removed from Lynch's earlier works as could be imagined, but in fact right from the very opening, this is entirely his film—a surreal road movie". It was also Lynch's only title released by Walt Disney Pictures in the U.S., after studio president Peter Schneider screened the film before its Cannes Film Festival premiere and quickly had Disney acquire the distribution rights. Schneider said it is "a beautiful movie about values, forgiveness and healing and celebrates America. As soon as I saw it, I knew it was a Walt Disney film." It was named one of the best films of the year by The New York Times; Janet Maslin wrote: "Somehow it took David Lynch to lead audiences past the ultimate frontier: into a G-rated parable of spirituality and decency, seen from the unfashionable vantage point of old age. Mr. Lynch accomplished the unthinkable by putting Richard Farnsworth, in a devastatingly real and rock-solid performance, on a lawnmower at five miles per hour and still building enough drama and emotion for a great chase. Burned out on the surreal and the grotesque, Mr. Lynch faced down inevitable realities about aging and conscience."

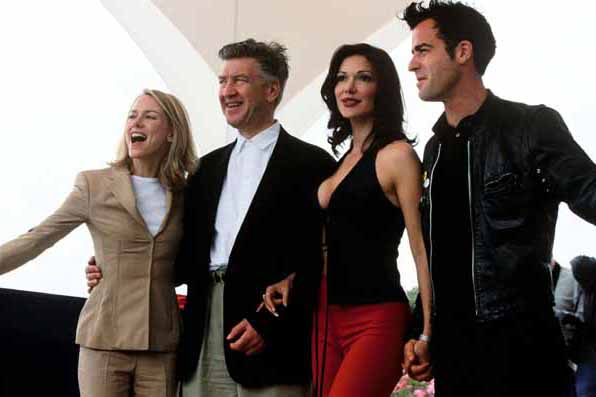
Lynch (second from left) at the 2001 Cannes Film Festival promoting Mulholland Drive

In 1999, Lynch approached ABC again with ideas for a television drama. The network gave Lynch the go-ahead to shoot a two-hour pilot for the series Mulholland Drive, but disputes over content and running time led to the project being shelved indefinitely. With $7 million from the French production company StudioCanal, Lynch completed the pilot as a film, Mulholland Drive. The film, a nonlinear surrealist tale of Hollywood's dark side, stars Naomi Watts, Laura Harring, and Justin Theroux. It performed relatively well at the box office worldwide and was a critical success, earning Lynch Best Director at the 2001 Cannes Film Festival (shared with Joel Coen for The Man Who Wasn't There) and Best Director from the New York Film Critics Association. He also received his third Academy Award nomination for Best Director. In 2016, the film was named the best film of the 21st century in a BBC poll of 177 film critics from 36 countries. Roger Ebert, who had dismissed much of Lynch's earlier work, wrote: "At last his experiment doesn't shatter the test tubes. The movie is a surrealist dreamscape in the form of a Hollywood film noir, and the less sense it makes, the more we can't stop watching it."

With the rising popularity of the Internet, Lynch decided to use it as a distribution channel, releasing several new series he had created exclusively on his website, davidlynch.com, which went online on December 10, 2001. In 2002, he created a series of online shorts, DumbLand. Intentionally crude in content and execution, the eight-episode series was later released on DVD. The same year, Lynch released a surreal sitcom, Rabbits, about a family of humanoid rabbits. Later, he made his experiments with Digital Video available in the form of the Japanese-style horror short Darkened Room. In 2006, Lynch's feature film Inland Empire was released. At three hours, it is his longest film. Like Mulholland Drive and Lost Highway, it lacks a traditional narrative structure. It stars Laura Dern, Harry Dean Stanton, and Justin Theroux, with cameos by Naomi Watts and Laura Harring as the voices of Suzie and Jane Rabbit, and a performance by Jeremy Irons. Lynch called Inland Empire "a mystery about a woman in trouble". In an effort to promote it, he made appearances with a cow and a placard bearing the slogan "Without cheese there would be no Inland Empire".

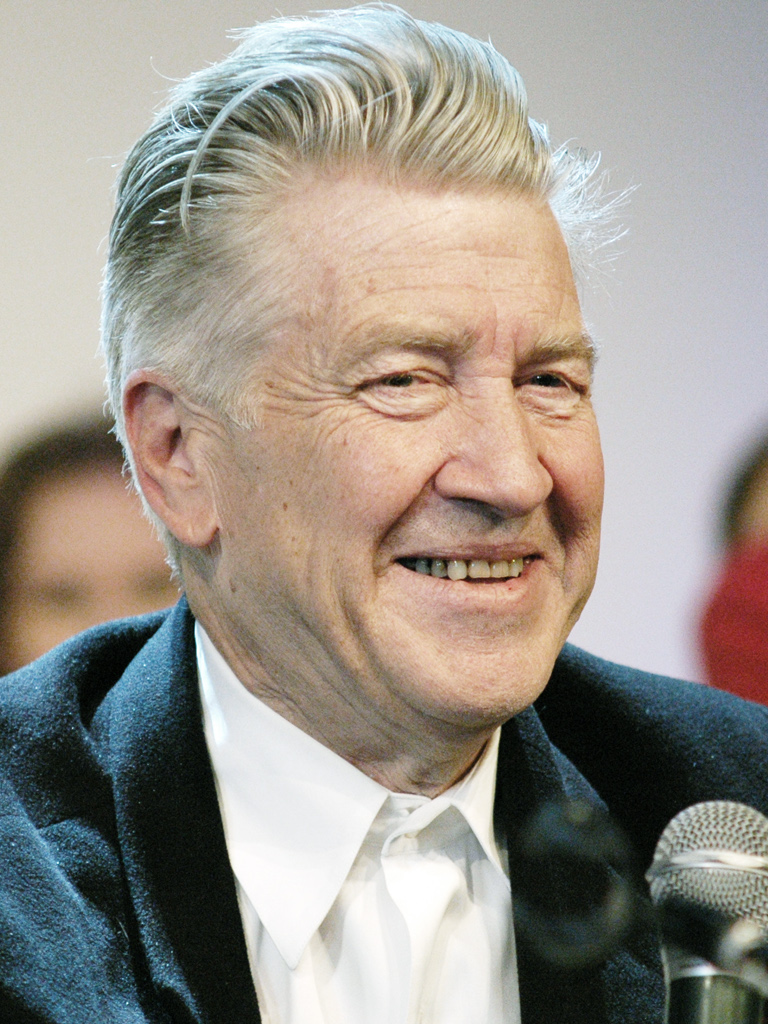
Lynch in Moscow in 2009

In 2009, Lynch produced a documentary Web series directed by his son Austin Lynch and friend Jason S., Interview Project. Interested in working with Werner Herzog, in 2009 Lynch collaborated on Herzog's film My Son, My Son, What Have Ye Done. With a nonstandard narrative, the film is based on a true story of an actor who committed matricide while acting in a production of the Oresteia, and stars Grace Zabriskie. In 2009, Lynch had plans to direct a documentary on Maharishi Mahesh Yogi consisting of interviews with people who knew him, but nothing came of it.

=== 2010–2019: Later work and return to television ===
In 2010, Lynch began making guest appearances on the Family Guy spin-off The Cleveland Show as Gus the Bartender. He had been convinced to appear in the show by its lead actor, Mike Henry, a fan of Lynch who felt that his life had changed after he saw Wild at Heart. Lady Blue Shanghai is a 16-minute promotional film written, directed and edited by Lynch for Dior. It was released on the Internet in May 2010.

Lynch directed a concert by English new wave band Duran Duran on March 23, 2011. The concert was streamed live on YouTube from the Mayan Theater in Los Angeles as the kickoff to the second season of Unstaged: An Original Series from American Express. "The idea is to try and create on the fly, layers of images permeating Duran Duran on the stage," Lynch said. "A world of experimentation and hopefully some happy accidents". The animated short I Touch a Red Button Man, a collaboration between Lynch and the band Interpol, played in the background during Interpol's concert at the Coachella Valley Music and Arts Festival in April 2011. The short, which features Interpol's song "Lights", was later made available online.

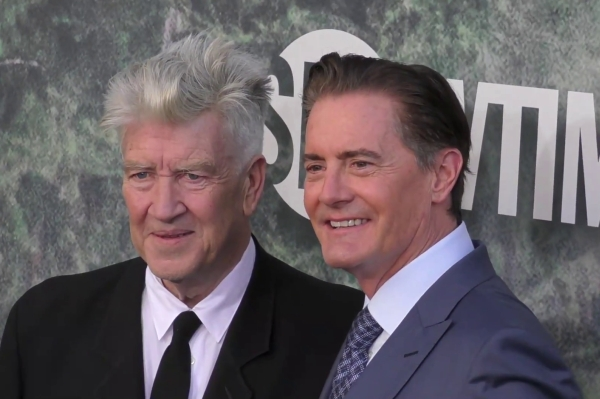
Lynch (left) with Kyle MacLachlan at the 2017 premiere of Twin Peaks's third season

It was believed that Lynch was going to retire from the film industry; according to Abel Ferrara, Lynch "doesn't even want to make films any more. I've talked to him about it, OK? I can tell when he talks about it." But in a June 2012 interview, Lynch said he lacked the inspiration to start a new movie project, but "If I got an idea that I fell in love with, I'd go to work tomorrow". In September 2012, he appeared in the three-part "Late Show" arc on FX's Louie as Jack Dahl. In November 2012, Lynch hinted at plans for a new film while attending Plus Camerimage in Bydgoszcz, Poland, saying, "something is coming up. It will happen but I don't know exactly when". At Plus Camerimage, Lynch received a lifetime achievement award and the Key to the City from Bydgoszcz's mayor, Rafał Bruski. In a January 2013 interview, Laura Dern confirmed that she and Lynch were planning a new project, and The New York Times later reported that Lynch was working on the script. Idem Paris, a short documentary film about the lithographic process, was released online in February 2013. On June 28, 2013, a video Lynch directed for the Nine Inch Nails song "Came Back Haunted" was released. He also did photography for the Dumb Numbers's self-titled album released in August 2013.

On October 6, 2014, Lynch confirmed via Twitter that he and Frost would start shooting a new, nine-episode season of Twin Peaks in 2015, with the episodes expected to air in 2016 on Showtime. Lynch and Frost wrote all the episodes. On April 5, 2015, Lynch announced via Twitter that the project was still alive, but he was no longer going to direct because the budget was too low for what he wanted to do. On May 15, 2015, he said via Twitter that he would return to the revival, having sorted out his issues with Showtime. Showtime CEO David Nevins confirmed this, announcing that Lynch would direct every episode of the revival and that the original nine episodes had been extended to 18. Filming was completed by April 2016. The two-episode premiere aired on May 21, 2017.

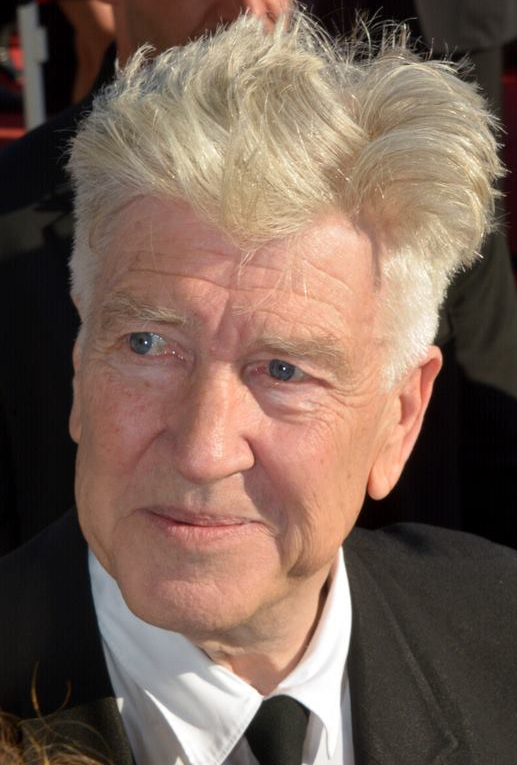
Lynch attending the 2017 Cannes Film Festival

While doing press for Twin Peaks, Lynch was again asked if he had retired from film and seemed to confirm that he had made his last feature film, responding, "Things changed a lot ... So many films were not doing well at the box office, even though they might have been great films and the things that were doing well at the box office weren't the things that I would want to do". Lynch later said that this statement had been misconstrued: "I did not say I quit cinema, simply that nobody knows what the future holds."

=== 2020–2025: Final years and return to weather reports ===
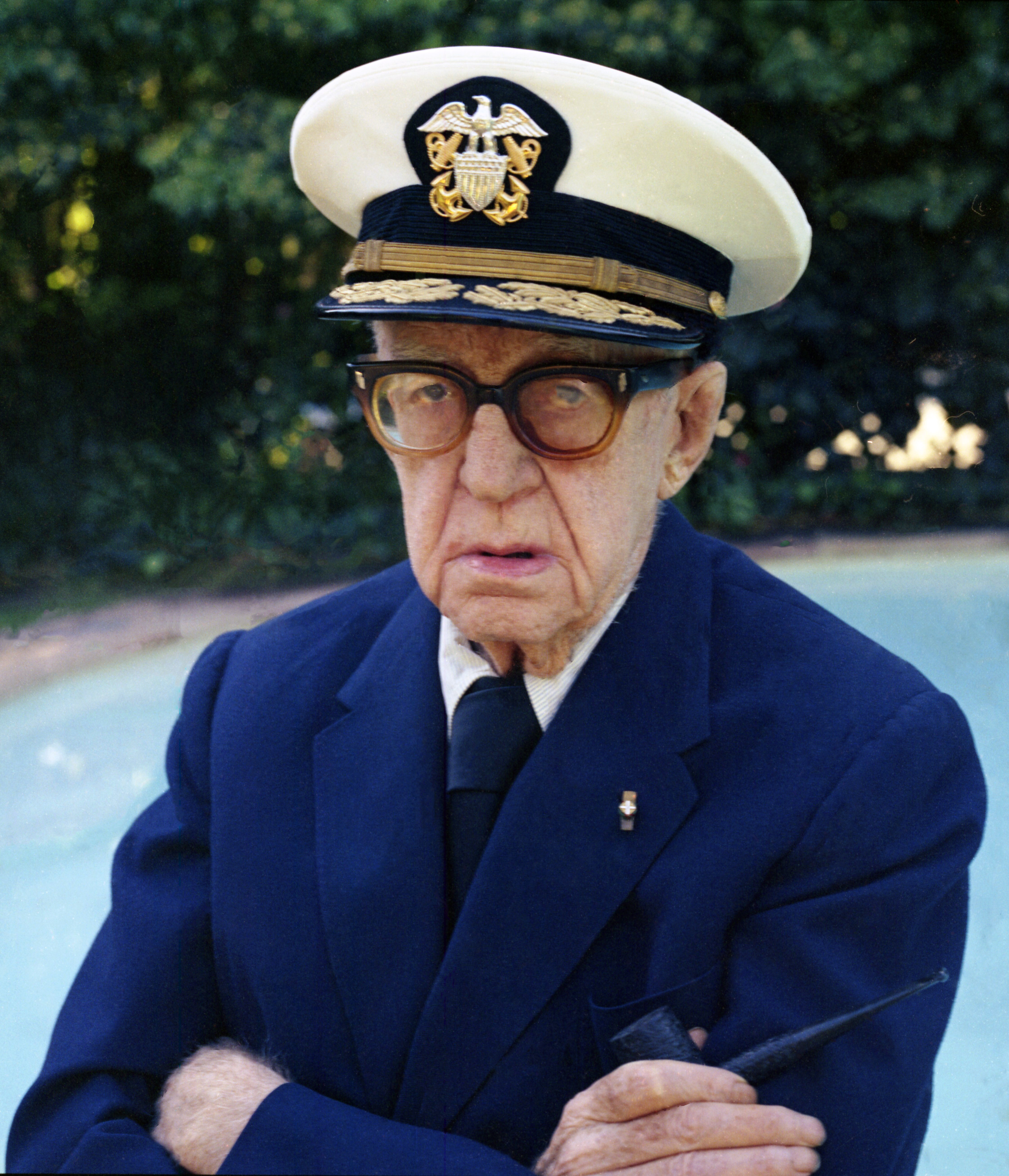
Lynch played John Ford (pictured) in Steven Spielberg's The Fabelmans (2022)

Lynch, who had uploaded daily videos of himself giving weather reports on his now-defunct website in the 2000s, returned to doing so in early 2020 due to being unable to leave his Los Angeles home during the COVID-19 pandemic. He also started two new online series: What is David Lynch Working on Today?, which detailed him making collages, and Today's Number Is..., in which he picked a random number between 1 and 10 each day from a jar containing 10 numbered ping-pong balls. In one of his weather reports, he detailed a vivid dream he had, in which he was a German soldier being shot by an American soldier on D-Day. Most of his weather reports featured him saying he was "thinking about" songs by artists such as the Beatles, the Everly Brothers, the Platters, and the Rolling Stones. He posted his final weather report on December 16, 2022, and confirmed in April 2023 that none of the three series would return: "Now I can sleep longer in the morning. I had to get up very early to consult the real weather bulletin. In two years I have not missed a single one."

In June 2020, Lynch re-released his web series Rabbits (2002) on YouTube. On July 17, his online merchandise shop began selling face masks with his artwork printed on them. He was cast in Steven Spielberg's semi-autobiographical film The Fabelmans (2022), playing a role Variety called "a closely guarded secret". Lynch was revealed to be playing director John Ford, whom the young Spielberg had once met in an encounter he considered formative. Lynch and the cast were nominated for the Screen Actors Guild Award for Outstanding Performance by a Cast in a Motion Picture. Film critic J. Hoberman wrote, "Mr. Lynch never made a conventional, crowd-pleasing Hollywood movie. But in 2022, he agreed to a cameo in one: Mr. Spielberg's autobiographical feature The Fabelmans, where the enigmatic if not eldritch Mr. Lynch was cast as John Ford, the maker of Westerns and the grand old curmudgeon of American cinema. It was a sentimental gesture that one can only call Lynchian."

== Other work ==
=== Unrealized projects ===
Lynch worked on a number of projects that never progressed beyond the pre-production stage. Some of them fell into development hell and others were officially canceled.

=== The Angriest Dog in the World ===
In 1983, Lynch began writing and drawing a comic strip, The Angriest Dog in the World, that featured unchanging graphics of a tethered dog so angry it could not move, alongside cryptic philosophical references. It was published from 1983 to 1992 in The Village Voice, Creative Loafing, and other tabloid and alternative publications. Around this time Lynch also became interested in photography and traveled to northern England to photograph its deteriorating industrial landscape.

=== The Cowboy and the Frenchman ===
Lynch directed a short film, The Cowboy and the Frenchman (1988), as part of The French as Seen by..., a series sponsored by the French newspaper Le Figaro. The other directors commissioned for the series were Werner Herzog, Andrzej Wajda, Luigi Comencini, and Jean-Luc Godard.

=== Industrial Symphony No. 1 ===
While Twin Peaks was in production, the Brooklyn Academy of Music asked Lynch and Badalamenti to create a theatrical piece to be performed twice in 1989 as a part of the New Music America Festival. The result was Industrial Symphony No. 1: The Dream of the Broken Hearted, which starred frequent Lynch collaborators Laura Dern, Nicolas Cage, and Michael J. Anderson and contained five songs sung by Julee Cruise. Lynch produced a 50-minute video of the performance in 1990.

=== Painting ===
Lynch painted So This Is Love in 1992.

Lynch first trained as a painter, and although better known as a filmmaker, continued to paint. He regarded himself as a visual artist equally at home in painting and cinema. Throughout his career he lamented what he called the "celebrity painter" problem, which relegated his artwork to the status of a hobby, "like golfing".

Of his aesthetic and approach, he said: "all my paintings are organic, violent comedies. They have to be violently done and primitive and crude, and to achieve that I try to let nature paint more than I paint." Many of his works are very dark in color; Lynch said this was because:

I wouldn't know what to do with [color]. Color to me is too real. It's limiting. It doesn't allow too much of a dream. The more you throw black into a color, the more dreamy it gets ... Black has depth. It's like a little egress; you can go into it, and because it keeps on continuing to be dark, the mind kicks in, and a lot of things that are going on in there become manifest. And you start seeing what you're afraid of. You start seeing what you love, and it becomes like a dream.

Many of Lynch's paintings contain letters and words. He said:

The words in the paintings are sometimes important to make you start thinking about what else is going on in there. And a lot of times, the words excite me as shapes, and something'll grow out of that. I used to cut these little letters out and glue them on. They just look good all lined up like teeth ... sometimes they become the title of the painting.

Lynch was the subject of a major art retrospective at the Fondation Cartier in Paris from March 3 to May 27, 2007. The show was titled The Air is on Fire and included paintings, photographs, drawings, alternative films and sound work. New site-specific art installations were created specially for the exhibition. A series of events, including live performances and concerts, accompanied the exhibition. Lynch's alma mater, the Pennsylvania Academy of the Fine Arts, presented the first U.S. museum exhibition of his visual art, titled "The Unified Field", which was on view from September 12, 2014, to January 11, 2015, in the Historic Landmark Building designed by Frank Furness and George Hewitt. Robert Cozzolino curated the exhibition in close collaboration with Lynch. During its opening week, Lynch traveled to Philadelphia to participate in several public events and film screenings, organized collaboratively by Cozzolino and local partners in the city. Lynch also participated in a private conversation and Q&A with PAFA students. The exhibition featured the first presentation of Six Men Getting Sick (Six Times) with its original sculpted "screen" since he debuted it as a PAFA student in 1967. It was given its own gallery several feet from where it was first shown, as his submission for a student experimental painting competition. Cozzolino acquired it for PAFA after the exhibition from artist and gallery owner Roger LaPelle, for whom Lynch had worked as a printer when he was living in Philadelphia. In his essay for the exhibition catalogue, Cozzolino calls the piece "a hybrid artwork rather than 'the first film.' Lynch, with the help of longtime friend and fellow PAFA student Jack Fisk, cast his body into a massive three-dimensional screen onto which this animated loop was aimed. The piece was an integrated painting, film, sculpture, installation, and sound piece that set the tone for the kind of work Lynch would pursue—not film alone, but a unified vision of multisensory experience working together." At the time of the exhibition, Lynch was represented by Kayne Griffin Corcoran in Los Angeles, and began exhibiting his paintings, drawings, and photography with the gallery in 2011.

Lynch considered the 20th-century Irish-born British artist Francis Bacon his "number one kinda hero painter", saying, "Normally I only like a couple of years of a painter's work, but I like everything of Bacon's. The guy, you know, had the stuff." His favorite photographers included William Eggleston (The Red Ceiling), Joel-Peter Witkin and Diane Arbus.

=== Music ===
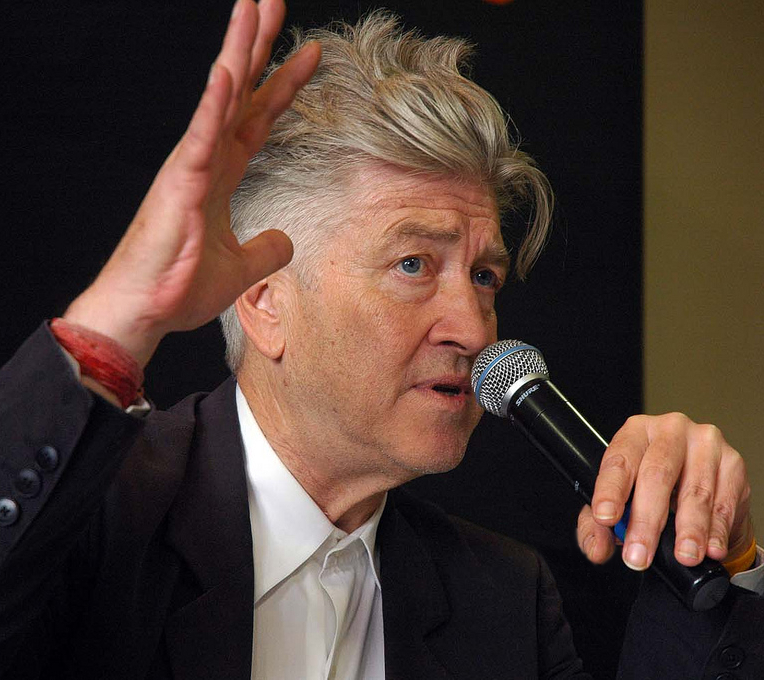
Lynch in 2007

Lynch was involved in several music projects, many of them related to his films, including sound design for some of his films (sometimes alongside collaborators Alan Splet, Dean Hurley, and Angelo Badalamenti). His album genres included experimental rock, ambient soundscapes and, most recently, avant-garde electropop music. He produced and wrote lyrics for Julee Cruise's first two albums, Floating into the Night (1989) and The Voice of Love (1993), in collaboration with Badalamenti, who wrote the music and also produced. In 1991, Lynch directed a 30-second teaser trailer for Michael Jackson's album Dangerous at Jackson's request. He also worked on the 1998 Jocelyn Montgomery album Lux Vivens (Living Light), The Music of Hildegard von Bingen. Lynch wrote music for Wild at Heart, Twin Peaks: Fire Walk with Me, Mulholland Drive, and Rabbits. In 2001, he released BlueBob, a blues album performed by Lynch and John Neff. The album is notable for Lynch's unusual guitar playing style. He plays "upside down and backwards, like a lap guitar", and relies heavily on effects pedals. Lynch wrote several pieces for Inland Empire, including two songs, "Ghost of Love" and "Walkin' on the Sky", in which he made his public debut as a singer. In 2009, his book-CD set Dark Night of the Soul was released. In 2008, he started his own record label, David Lynch MC, which first released Fox Bat Strategy: A Tribute to Dave Jaurequi in early 2009.

In November 2010, Lynch released two electropop music singles, "Good Day Today" and "I Know", on the independent British label Sunday Best Recordings. Of the songs, he said: "I was just sitting and these notes came and then I went down and started working with Dean [Hurley] and then these few notes, 'I want to have a good day, today' came and the song was built around that." The singles were followed by an album, Crazy Clown Time, which was released in November 2011 and described as an "electronic blues album". The songs were sung by Lynch, with guest vocals on one track by Karen O of Yeah Yeah Yeahs, and composed and performed by Lynch and Hurley. All or most of the songs on Crazy Clown Time were put into art-music videos, with Lynch directing the title song's video.

On September 29, 2011, Lynch released This Train with vocalist and longtime musical collaborator Chrystabell on the La Rose Noire label. Lynch's second studio album, The Big Dream, was released in 2013 and included the single "I'm Waiting Here", with Swedish singer-songwriter Lykke Li. The Big Dream's release was preceded by TBD716, an enigmatic 43-second video featured on Lynch's YouTube and Vine accounts. For Record Store Day 2014, Lynch released The Big Dream Remix EP, which featured four songs from his album remixed by various artists. This included the track "Are You Sure" remixed by the band Bastille, which is known to have been inspired by Lynch's work for its songs and videos, especially the song "Laura Palmer".

In November 2018, a collaborative album by Lynch and Badalamenti, Thought Gang, was released on vinyl and compact disc. The album was recorded around 1993 but not released at the time. Two tracks from it appear on the soundtrack for Twin Peaks: Fire Walk with Me and three others were used for Twin Peaks: The Return. In May 2019, Lynch provided guest vocals on the track "Fire is Coming" by Flying Lotus. He also co-wrote the track that appears on Flying Lotus's album Flamagra. A video accompanying the song was released on April 17, 2019. In May 2021, Lynch produced a track, "I Am the Shaman", by Scottish artist Donovan. The song was released on May 10, Donovan's 75th birthday. Lynch also directed the accompanying video.

In August 2024, Lynch released his final album, Cellophane Memories, a collaboration between him and Chrystabell. He also directed videos for two tracks on the album, "Sublime Eternal Love" and "The Answers to the Questions".

=== Design ===
Lynch designed and constructed furniture for his 1997 film Lost Highway, including the small table in the Madison house and the VCR case. Several scenes in the film were shot inside his Los Angeles home, known as the David Lynch Compound, which was designed by Lloyd Wright. Lynch and Wright's son Eric Lloyd Wright collaborated on the design and construction of several buildings on the property. In April 1997, Lynch presented a furniture collection at the Milan Furniture Fair. "Design and music, art and architecture—they all belong together", he said.

Working with designer Raphael Navot, architectural agency Enia, and light designer Thierry Dreyfus, Lynch conceived and designed a Paris nightclub, Silencio. It opened in October 2011 and is a private members' club, but is free to the public after midnight. Patrons have access to concerts, films, and other performances by artists and guests. Inspired by the club of the same name in Mulholland Drive, the underground space has a series of rooms, each dedicated to a certain purpose or atmosphere. "Silencio is something dear to me. I wanted to create an intimate space where all the arts could come together. There won't be a Warhol-like guru, but it will be open to celebrated artists of all disciplines to come here to program or create what they want."

=== Literature ===
In 2006, Lynch wrote a short book, Catching the Big Fish: Meditation, Consciousness, and Creativity, which describes his creative processes, stories from his career, and the benefits he realized from his practice of Transcendental Meditation. He describes the metaphor behind the title in the introduction:

Ideas are like fish.

If you want to catch little fish, you can stay in the shallow water. But if you want to catch the big fish, you've got to go deeper.

Down deep, the fish are more powerful and more pure. They're huge and abstract. And they're very beautiful.

The book weaves a nonlinear autobiography with descriptions of Lynch's experiences during Transcendental Meditation. Lynch also narrated it in an audiobook.

Working with Kristine McKenna, Lynch published a biography-memoir hybrid, Room to Dream, in June 2018.

=== Website ===
Lynch designed his personal website, a site exclusive to paying members, where he posted short videos, his absurdist series Dumbland, interviews, and other items. The site also featured a daily weather report where Lynch gave a brief description of the weather in Los Angeles, where he resided. He continued to broadcast this report (usually no longer than 30 seconds) on his personal YouTube channel, DAVID LYNCH THEATER, along with "TODAY'S NUMBER", where he drew a random number between one and ten out of a bingo cage. Lynch also created a short film, "Rabbits", for his website.

Lynch was a coffee drinker and had his own line of special organic blends available for purchase on his website and at Whole Foods. Called "David Lynch Signature Cup", the coffee has been advertised via flyers included with several Lynch-related DVD releases, including Inland Empire and the Gold Box edition of Twin Peaks. The brand's tagline is "It's all in the beans ... and I'm just full of beans", a line Justin Theroux's character says in Inland Empire.

== Personal life ==
=== Marriages, relationships, and children ===
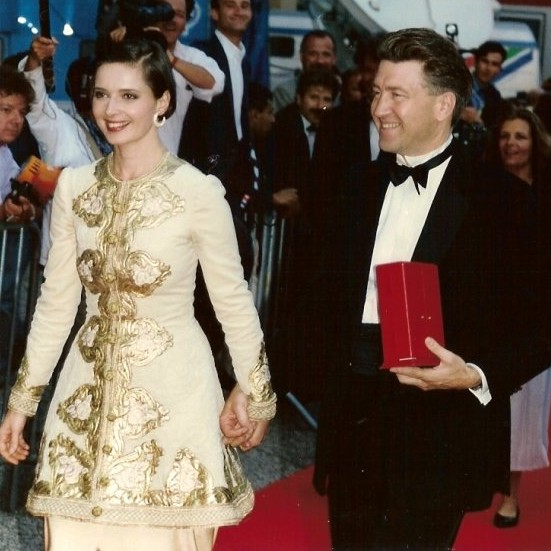
Lynch with Isabella Rossellini at the 1990 Cannes Film Festival.

Lynch had several long-term relationships. In January 1968, he married Peggy Reavey, with whom he had one child, Jennifer Lynch, a film director. They filed for divorce in 1974. In June 1977, Lynch married Mary Fisk, with whom he had one child, Austin Jack Lynch, in 1982. They separated in 1985 and divorced in 1987. Lynch had a relationship with actress Isabella Rossellini and lived with her between 1986 and 1991. In 1992, he and his editor Mary Sweeney had a son, Riley Sweeney Lynch. Sweeney also worked as Lynch's producer and co-wrote and produced The Straight Story. The two married in May 2006, but filed for divorce that June. In 2009, Lynch married actress Emily Stofle, who appeared in his 2006 film Inland Empire as well as the 2017 revival of Twin Peaks. The couple had one child, Lula Boginia Lynch, in 2012. Stofle filed for divorce in 2023. A divorce settlement agreement was reached on December 20, 2024, but the court had not issued a final divorce decree at the time of Lynch's death.

=== Political and public views ===
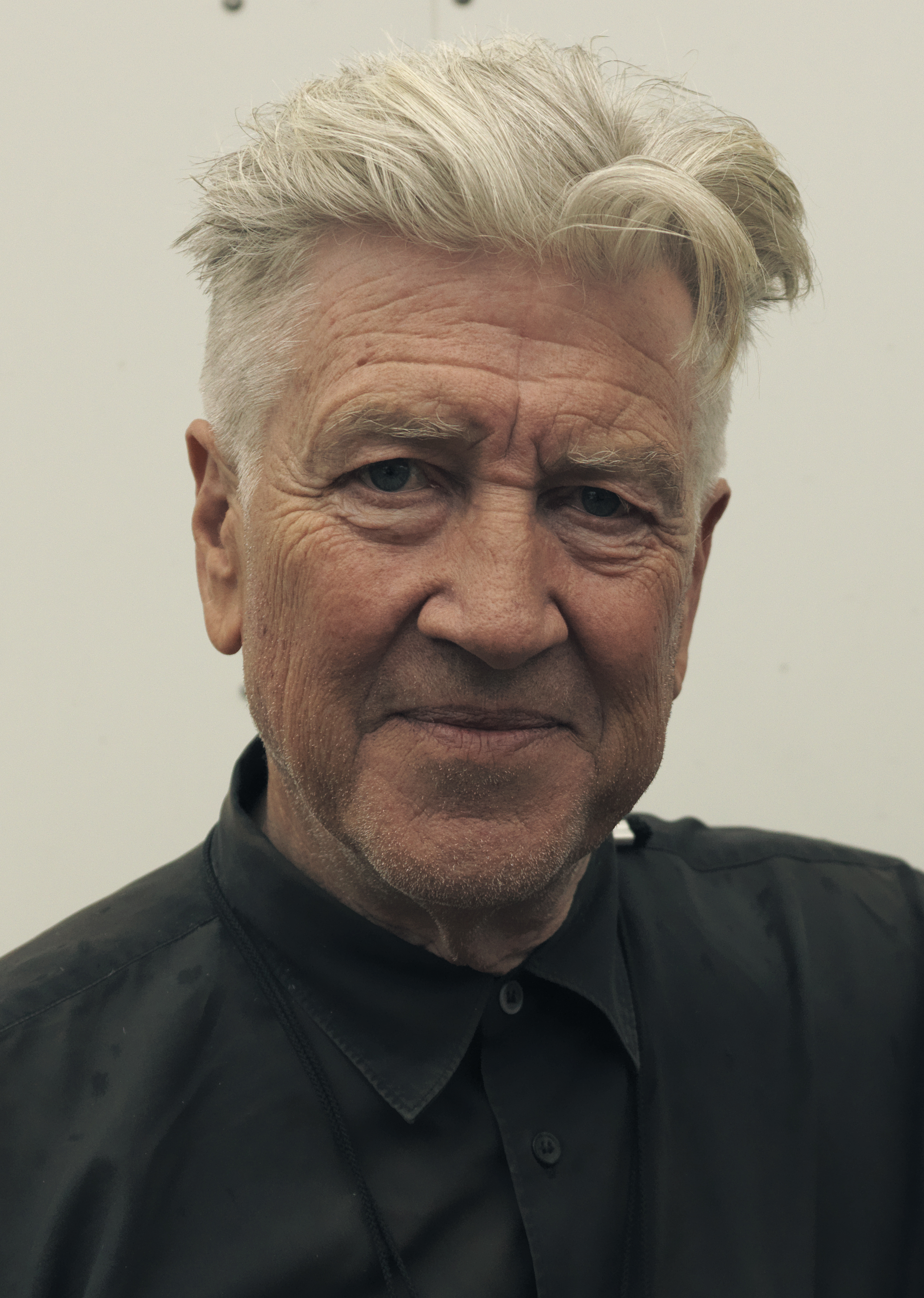
Lynch in 2016

Lynch was present with other Boy Scouts outside the White House at the inauguration of President John F. Kennedy, which took place on Lynch's 15th birthday. When Kennedy was assassinated in 1963, Lynch was the first in his school to hear of it, as he was working on a display case rather than attending class.

In 2009, Lynch signed a petition in support of director Roman Polanski who, while traveling to a film festival, was detained based on his 1977 arrest for alleged sexual abuse. The petition argued the arrest would undermine the tradition of film festivals as a place for works to be shown "freely and safely", and that arresting filmmakers traveling to neutral countries could open the door "for actions of which no one can know the effects". In 2025, Lynch's daughter, Jennifer Lynch, said her father regretted signing the petition after she confronted him about it.

Lynch said he was "not a political person" and knew little about politics. Describing his political philosophy in 2006, he said, "at that time [the 1990s], I thought of myself as a libertarian. I believed in next to zero government. And I still would lean toward no government and not so many rules, except for traffic lights and things like this. I really believe in traffic regulations." He continued: "I'm a Democrat now. And I've always been a Democrat, really. But I don't like the Democrats a lot, either, because I'm a smoker, and I think a lot of the Democrats have come up with these rules for non-smoking." He said he voted for Ronald Reagan in the 1984 presidential election; in the 2000 presidential election he endorsed the Natural Law Party's candidate John Hagelin, an advocate for Transcendental Meditation. In the 2012 presidential election he said he would vote for Democratic incumbent Barack Obama.

In the 2016 U.S. presidential election, Lynch endorsed Bernie Sanders, whom he described as "for the people". He voted for Sanders in the 2016 Democratic primaries and for Libertarian nominee Gary Johnson in the general election. In a June 2018 interview with The Guardian, Lynch said that Donald Trump could go down as "one of the greatest presidents in history because he has disrupted the [country] so much. No one is able to counter this guy in an intelligent way." He added: "Our so-called leaders can't take the country forward, can't get anything done. Like children, they are. Trump has shown all this." The interviewer clarified that "while Trump may not be doing a good job himself, Lynch thinks, he is opening up a space where other outsiders might." At a rally later that month, Trump read out sections of the interview, and seemed to quote a Breitbart write-up of the comments that said Lynch "now appears to believe that Trump may have been the right choice". Lynch later wrote on Facebook that his words were taken out of context, saying that Trump would "not have a chance to go down in history as a great president" if he continued on the course of "causing suffering and division" and advising him to "treat all the people as you would like to be treated".

In one of his weather report videos in 2020, Lynch expressed support for Black Lives Matter protests after the murder of George Floyd. In a 2022 weather report, he condemned the 2022 Russian invasion of Ukraine and addressed Russian president Vladimir Putin directly, telling him there was "no room for this kind of absurdity anymore" and that Putin would reap what he had sown, lifetime after lifetime.

=== Transcendental Meditation ===
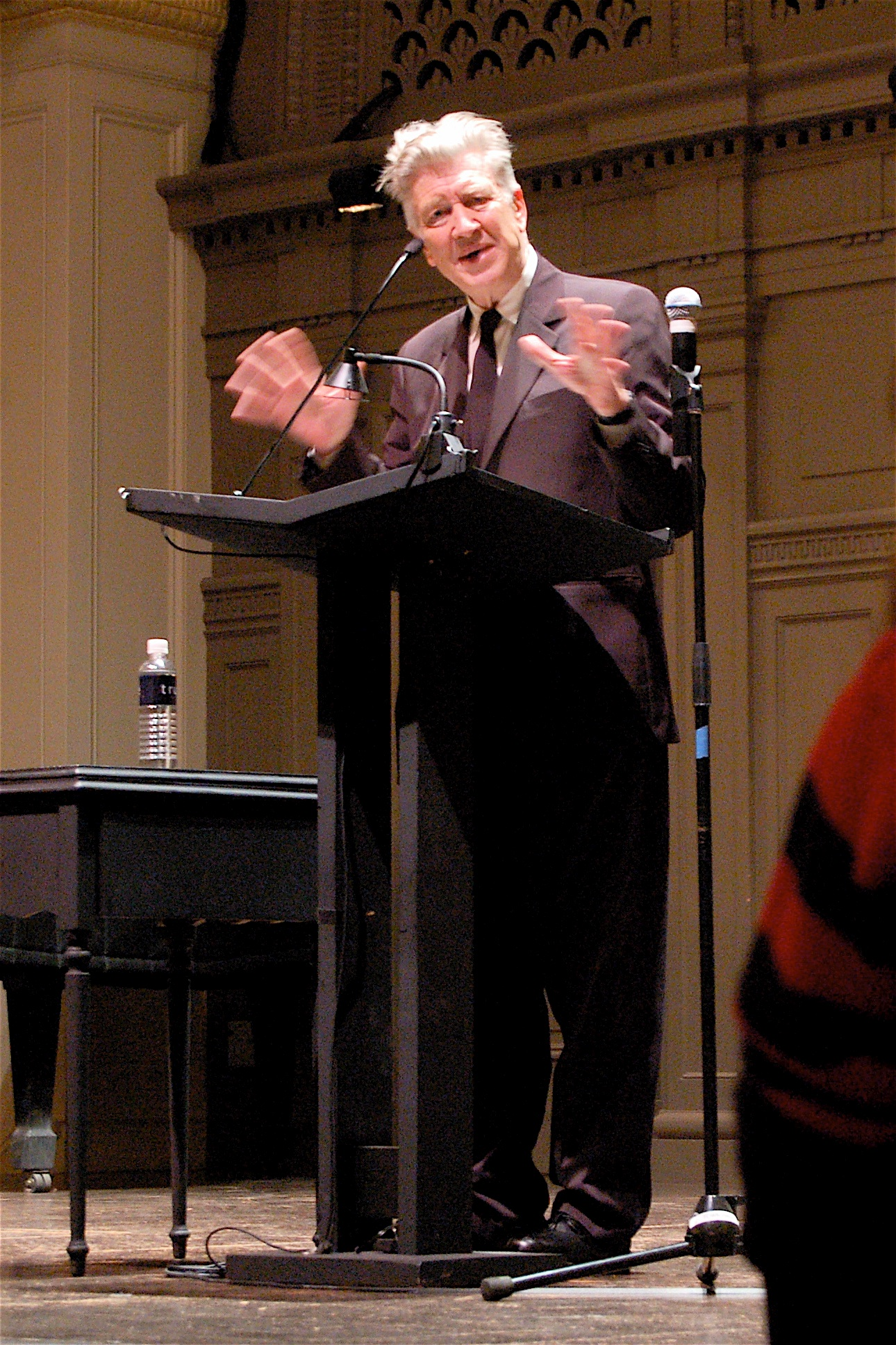
Lynch speaking on Transcendental Meditation and the creative process in 2007

Lynch advocated Transcendental Meditation as a spiritual practice. He was initiated into Transcendental Meditation in July 1973, and practiced the technique consistently thereafter. Lynch said he met Maharishi Mahesh Yogi, the founder of the TM movement, for the first time in 1975 at the Spiritual Regeneration Movement center in Los Angeles. He became close with the Maharishi during a month-long "Millionaire's Enlightenment Course" held in 2003, the fee for which was $1 million.

In July 2005, Lynch launched the David Lynch Foundation for Consciousness-Based Education and Peace, established to help finance scholarships for students in middle and high schools who are interested in learning Transcendental Meditation and to fund research on the technique and its effects on learning. Together with John Hagelin and Fred Travis, a brain researcher from Maharishi University of Management (MUM), Lynch promoted his vision on college campuses with a tour that began in September 2005. Lynch was on MUM's board of trustees and hosted an annual "David Lynch Weekend for World Peace and Meditation" there, beginning in 2005. The foundation has also funded meditation lessons for veterans and other "at-risk" populations.

Lynch was working for the building and establishment of seven buildings in which 8,000 salaried people would practice advanced meditation techniques, "pumping peace for the world". He estimated the cost at US$7 billion. As of December 2005, he had spent $400,000 of his money and raised $1 million in donations. In December 2006, The New York Times reported that he continued to have that goal. Lynch's book Catching the Big Fish (2006) discusses Transcendental Meditation's effect on his creative process. Lynch attended the Maharishi's funeral in India in 2008. He told a reporter, "In life, he revolutionized the lives of millions of people. ... In 20, 50, 500 years there will be millions of people who will know and understand what the Maharishi has done." In 2009, Lynch went to India to film interviews with people who knew the Maharishi as part of a biographical documentary.

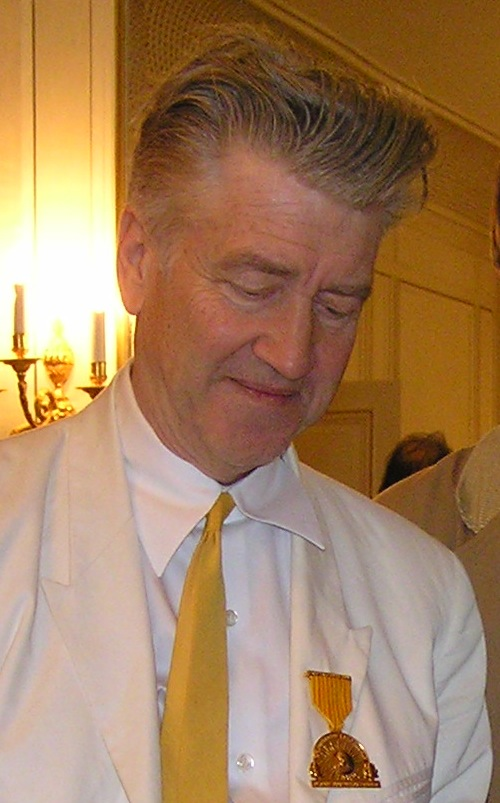
Lynch dedicating his book Catching the Big Fish in Paris on the occasion of his World Tour in 2007.

In 2009, Lynch organized a benefit concert at Radio City Music Hall for the David Lynch Foundation. On April 4, 2009, the "Change Begins Within" concert featured Paul McCartney, Ringo Starr, Donovan, Sheryl Crow, Eddie Vedder, Moby, Bettye LaVette, Ben Harper, and Mike Love. David Wants to Fly is a 2010 documentary by German filmmaker David Sieveking "that follows the path of his professional idol, David Lynch, into the world of Transcendental Meditation (TM)". At the end of the film, Sieveking becomes disillusioned with the TM movement.

An independent project starring Lynch called Beyond The Noise: My Transcendental Meditation Journey, directed by Dana Farley, who has severe dyslexia and attention deficit disorder, was shown at film festivals in 2011, including the Marbella Film Festival. Filmmaker Kevin Sean Michaels is one of the producers. In 2013, Lynch wrote: "Transcendental Meditation leads to a beautiful, peaceful revolution. A change from suffering and negativity to happiness and a life more and more free of any problems."

In a 2019 interview by British artist Alexander de Cadenet, Lynch said: "Here's an experience that utilizes the full brain. That's what it's for. It's for enlightenment, for higher states of consciousness, culminating in the highest state of unity consciousness." In April 2022, Lynch announced a $500 million transcendental meditation world peace initiative to fund transcendental meditation for 30,000 college students. In September 2024, Lynch made his last published broadcast speech at Meditate America 2024. He discussed the Beatles' (particularly John Lennon's) practice of TM during their visit to India in 1968 and played a cover of "Across the Universe".

== Illness and death ==
In August 2024, Lynch said in an interview that he had been diagnosed with emphysema in 2020 after a lifetime of smoking and had become housebound due to health risks, which he surmised would likely prevent him from directing any new projects. Three months later, he told People that he had quit smoking in 2022, having started when he was eight years old; he said he was reliant on supplemental oxygen for most daily activities and could "hardly walk across a room".

Lynch also said that due to the risks of contracting COVID-19, he could no longer leave his house, meaning that he would only be able to direct remotely. He said a project for Netflix, with working titles Wisteria and Unrecorded Night, had fallen through, but that he would like to see his unrealized projects Antelope Don't Run No More and Snootworld realized. Lynch said that month that he was working on existing projects as much as he could, and that he was in good health except for emphysema, and had no plans to retire.

In January 2025, Lynch was evacuated from his Los Angeles home due to the Southern California wildfires. These events preceded a terminal decline in his health, and he died at his daughter Jennifer's home in Los Angeles on January 16 at the age of 78.

Announcing his death, Lynch's family posted a message on his Facebook page that read, "There's a big hole in the world now that he's no longer with us. But, as he would say, 'Keep your eye on the donut and not on the hole.'"

Lynch's death certificate, publicly reported in February 2025, concluded that the immediate cause of death was cardiac arrest, with chronic obstructive pulmonary disease cited as the underlying cause. Dehydration was also mentioned as a significant contributor. The death certificate said he was cremated, with his ashes buried at Hollywood Forever Cemetery.

=== Tributes ===
Lynch's collaborators Nicolas Cage, Isabella Rossellini, Laura Dern, Naomi Watts, and Kyle MacLachlan wrote tributes to him. MacLachlan honored Lynch with a tribute in The New York Times. He wrote: "I was willing to follow him anywhere because joining him on the journey of discovery, searching and finding together, was the whole point. I stepped out into the unknown because I knew David was floating out there with me... I will miss my dear friend. He has made my world—all of our worlds—both wonderful and strange". The Writers Guild of America announced that MacLachlan would posthumously give Lynch the Laurel Award for Screenwriting Achievement.

Steven Spielberg wrote of directing Lynch in The Fabelmans: "Here was one of my heroes—David Lynch—playing one of my heroes [...] The world is going to miss such an original and unique voice. His films have already stood the test of time and they always will." Martin Scorsese wrote a statement that read in part, "He put images on the screen unlike anything that I or anybody else had ever seen—he made everything strange, uncanny, revelatory and new." Tributes were also paid by Judd Apatow, Mel Brooks, Francis Ford Coppola, Terry Gilliam, James Gunn, Ron Howard, Patton Oswalt, Billy Corgan, Questlove, and Ben Stiller.

Critic Peter Bradshaw of The Guardian eulogized Lynch as "the great American surrealist". Critic Richard Brody of The New Yorker wrote, "many films are called revelatory and visionary, but Lynch's films seem made to exemplify these terms", citing his "audacious invention and exquisite realization of symbolic details and uncanny realms".

The 2025 Stockholm International Film Festival was dedicated to Lynch's memory. It honored his legacy with retrospectives, discussions, and curated screenings.

Lynch's oft-chosen self-description was "Eagle Scout, Missoula, Montana".

=== Memorials ===
Soon after Lynch died, fans began placing flowers beneath the "Bob's Big Boy Statue", a statue of Bob's Big Boy's titular mascot outside its Burbank location. Lynch was known to enjoy Big Boy's chocolate milkshakes and coffee, and frequented the spot for many years.

Around the same time, a similar scenario occurred at Twede's Cafe in North Bend, Washington, the original location of the "Double R Diner" in Twin Peaks. As at Big Boy's, flowers, photos, and personal letters were left outside the diner.

== Filmmaking approach ==
=== Style ===
"An academic definition of Lynchian might be that the term 'refers to a particular kind of irony where the very macabre and the very mundane combine in such a way as to reveal the former's perpetual containment within the latter'".

— Writer David Foster Wallace in a 1997 article on David Lynch for Premiere

Lynch's distinctive style blends abstract surrealism with "pulpy" romanticism and classic Hollywood elements. His films have been said to evoke a "dreamlike quality of mystery or menace" through striking visual imagery, and frequently combine "surreal or sinister elements with mundane, everyday environments". He is often credited with bringing surrealism and experimentalism to mainstream media in the late 20th century. Critic Peter Bradshaw of The Guardian called Lynch "the great American surrealist" and described his subversive narratives as "splitting and swirling in non sequiturs and Escher loops". J. Hoberman wrote that Lynch's work is characterized by "troubling juxtapositions, outlandish non sequiturs and eroticized derangement of the commonplace". Hoberman called his approach "more intuitive" than that of his surrealist precursors, and suggested that his art synthesized the disparate styles of Hollywood filmmaker Frank Capra and modernist author Franz Kafka. Film journalist Ryan Gilbey called Lynch "the greatest cinematic surrealist since [Luis] Buñuel" and "the most original filmmaker to emerge in postwar America".

Lynch often employed experimental filmmaking techniques and dreamlike narratives alongside tropes from commercial genres such as film noir, supernatural horror, soap opera, camp comedy, and erotic thriller. Dennis Lim wrote that Lynch's films "push clichés to their breaking point and find emotion in artifice". B. Kite of the BFI called Lynch's approach "stylised but not mocking", arguing that Lynch was "singularly brave and direct in his approach to heightened emotion" in an era when most filmmakers would opt for ironic distance. Nick De Semlyen of Empire wrote that Lynch's films move "back and forth between violent chaos and otherworldly beauty" and that "while other filmmakers tried to wrestle order out of chaos, compacting their stories into neat three-act structures, Lynch revelled in the tumult—that feeling that life is a beautiful, terrifying mystery."

Lynch's distinctive style inspired the adjective "Lynchian" to describe art or situations reminiscent of his style. Phil Hoad of The Guardian called the term Lynchian a "go-to adjective to describe any sniff of the uncanny and esoteric on screen", adding that his "destabilising vision has become a common lens for discerning the truth about the 'normal world'". The "Lynchian uncanny", according to Francesco Ruggieri Fornari of Firebird Magazine, is chiefly defined by the experience of "inexplicable discomfort in the seemingly beautiful and familiar".

=== Themes and motifs ===
Lynch refused to publicly explain or assign any specific meaning to his works, preferring that viewers interpret them in their own ways. Asked how one should approach his films, he said: "You should not be afraid of using your intuition and feel your way through. Have the experience and trust your inner knowing of what it is."

I look at the world and I see absurdity all around me. People do strange things constantly, to the point that, for the most part, we manage not to see it. That's why I love coffee shops and public places—I mean, they're all out there.

— David Lynch

Many elements recur in Lynch's work; Le Blanc and Odell write, "his films are so packed with motifs, recurrent characters, images, compositions and techniques that you could view his entire output as one large jigsaw puzzle of ideas". Works like Blue Velvet and Twin Peaks depict stories in which "the folksiness of small town America collided with utter depravity, beset by evils from both sides of the white picket fence", while his later "Hollywood trilogy"—Lost Highway, Mulholland Drive, and Inland Empire—explores "the celluloid dreams of Los Angeles [against the] bitter realities and almost cosmic horrors lurking in the hills". Elements like red theater curtains, diners, dreams, nightclub singers, and occult-like rituals recur frequently in Lynch's work. Another prominent motif is industry, with repeated imagery of "the clunk of machinery, the power of pistons, shadows of oil drills pumping, screaming woodmills and smoke billowing factories". Other imagery common in Lynch's work includes flickering electricity or lights, fire, and stages.

Physical deformity is also found in several of Lynch's films, as is death by head wound. His work frequently depicts a dark, violent criminal underbelly of society, and often contains characters with supernatural or omnipotent qualities. Gilbey wrote that Lynch's work "exposed the horrors lurking beneath apparently placid exteriors, and found beauty in the quotidian, the industrial" while reflecting a "mix of folksy naivety and elusive strangeness". Critic Greg Olson wrote that Lynch's work is preoccupied with the "deepest realities" behind surfaces and facades. Author David Foster Wallace wrote that Lynch's films deconstruct "the weird irony of the banal".

In The New Yorker, Dennis Lim concluded that "the primal terror of Lynch's films is an existential one" and that "the volatility of the self and of reality" is central to his work. Lim wrote that "for Lynch, disruption is generative: trauma, the recurring subject of his films, can rupture the fabric of reality". According to Chris Thiessen, Lynch's films explore "enchanted (and haunted) worlds, permeable and multi-layered, filled with the unknown and the spiritual." Critic Mark Fisher noted that Lynch's works destabilize the hierarchy between distinct levels of reality and fiction, resulting in an ambiguous ontological situation in which "any apparent reality subsides into a dream". Kite wrote that "the central mystery" of Lynch's work is rooted in overlapping "worlds" of consciousness and the resultant "perpetual folding between outside and inside". Lynch's work reflects a preoccupation with the instability of identity, particularly in female characters. He tended to feature his female leads in "split" roles: many of his female characters have multiple, fractured identities. Hoberman identified a duality between "exaggerated, even saccharine innocence" and "depraved evil" in his work, while Lim emphasized that the good and evil in Lynch's art exist in an ambiguous relationship to each other.

Lynch's affinity for Eastern spirituality is evident in his films, though it typically manifests in American trappings. Joseph Joyce of Angelus wrote, "his work could perhaps properly be understood as the marriage between Western kitsch and Eastern spirituality". According to Kite, much of Lynch's work is underpinned by his Advaita Vedanta–inspired philosophy, in which the soul is defined by "light and unity" but forgets its original essence, becoming lost in illusions of isolation, violence, and separateness for some time before awakening to remember its true nature. Kite suggested that Lynch could be understood as "a religious or spiritual artist in a loosely categoric sense", and called his worldview "essentially monist" but punctuated by superficial duality and Gnostic conflict. Lynch directly invoked the Vedic scriptures known as the Upanishads in several of his films and books; in Twin Peaks: The Return and in his live introductions to Inland Empire, he quotes a passage from an adapted version of the Brihadaranyaka Upanishad:

We are like the spider. We weave our life and then move along in it. We are like the dreamer who dreams and then lives in the dream. This is true for the entire universe.

All but two of Lynch's films are set in the United States, and he frequently referenced 1950s and early 1960s U.S. culture despite his works being set in later decades. Bradshaw wrote, "[n]o director ever interpreted the American Dream with more artless innocence than David Lynch", citing his work's juxtaposition of the safety of "the suburban drive and the picket fence" with "escape, danger, adventure, sex and death". Joyce wrote, "it's easy to presume that Lynch was cynic. But [...] he really did love Americana; blue jeans and slicked hair, soda fountains, Roy Orbison and, yes, milkshakes". Lynch said: "I like certain things about America and it gives me ideas. When I go around and I see things, it sparks little stories". Of the 1950s, he said, "It was a fantastic decade in a lot of ways ... there was something in the air that is not there any more at all. It was such a great feeling, and not just because I was a kid. It was a really hopeful time, and things were going up instead of going down. You got the feeling you could do anything. The future was bright. Little did we know we were laying the groundwork for a disastrous future."

=== Influences ===
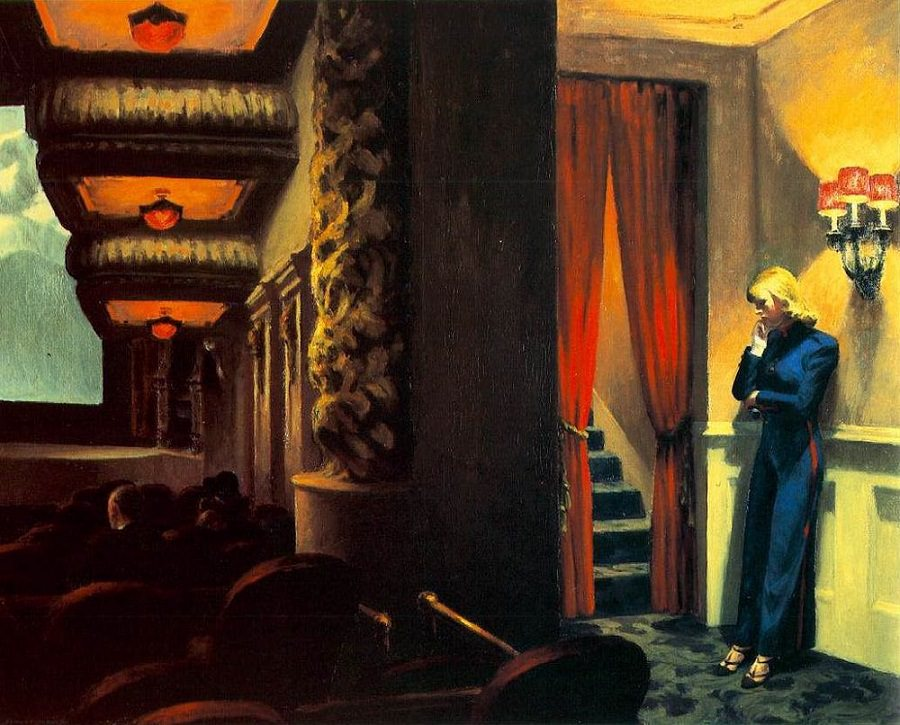
New York Movie (1939) by Edward Hopper, one of Lynch's favorite painters.

Lynch felt that his work was more similar to that of European filmmakers than American ones, and said that most films that "get down and thrill your soul" are by European directors. He expressed admiration for Federico Fellini, Ingmar Bergman, Werner Herzog, Alfred Hitchcock, Roman Polanski, Jacques Tati, Stanley Kubrick, and Billy Wilder. His favorite film, and one he regularly returned to, was Victor Fleming's The Wizard of Oz. He said that Wilder's Sunset Boulevard (1950) was one of his favorite pictures, as were "probably all of Bergman's movies", Kubrick's Lolita (1962), Fellini's 8½ (1963), Tati's Monsieur Hulot's Holiday (1953), Hitchcock's Rear Window (1954), and Herzog's Stroszek (1977). He also cited the colored art direction in Jerzy Skolimowski's Deep End (1970) as an influence on his work. Some have suggested that Lynch's love of Hitchcock's Vertigo influenced his use of dual-identity female roles.

Edward Hopper and Francis Bacon were two of Lynch's favorite painters. Lynch also praised installation artist Edward Kienholz. Lynch said his favorite books were Frank Capra's The Name Above the Title, Fyodor Dostoyevsky's Crime and Punishment, Robert Henri's The Art Spirit, Robert Flynn Johnson's Anonymous Photographs, and Franz Kafka's The Metamorphosis.

=== Recurring collaborators ===
Lynch was noted for his collaborations with various production artists and composers on his films and other productions. He frequently worked with composer Angelo Badalamenti, film editor Mary Sweeney, casting director Johanna Ray, and actors Harry Dean Stanton, Jack Nance, Kyle MacLachlan, Catherine Coulson, Laura Dern, Naomi Watts, Isabella Rossellini, and Grace Zabriskie.

== Legacy ==
Lynch was often called a "visionary". In 2007, a panel of critics convened by The Guardian announced that "after all the discussion, no one could fault the conclusion that David Lynch is the most important film-maker of the current era", and AllMovie called him "the Renaissance man of modern American filmmaking". Film critic Pauline Kael called Lynch "the first populist surrealist".

== Filmography ==
=== Film ===
| Year | Title | Distributor |
|---|---|---|
| 1977 | Eraserhead | Libra Films International |
| 1980 | The Elephant Man | Paramount Pictures |
| 1984 | Dune | Universal Pictures |
| 1986 | Blue Velvet | De Laurentiis Entertainment Group |
| 1990 | Wild at Heart | The Samuel Goldwyn Company |
| 1992 | Twin Peaks: Fire Walk with Me | New Line Cinema |
| 1997 | Lost Highway | October Films, Asymmetrical Productions |
| 1999 | The Straight Story | Buena Vista Pictures (under Walt Disney Pictures) |
| 2001 | Mulholland Drive | Universal Pictures |
| 2006 | Inland Empire | Absurda, 518 Media |

=== Television ===
| Year | Title | Network | Ref. |
|---|---|---|---|
| 1990–1991 | Twin Peaks | ABC | |
| 1992 | On the Air | ABC | |
| 1993 | Hotel Room | HBO | |
| 2017 | Twin Peaks: The Return | Showtime | |

== Accolades ==
Lynch received multiple awards and nominations, including three Academy Award nominations for Best Director and one for Best Adapted Screenplay, in addition to nominations for two British Academy Film Awards and four Golden Globe Awards. He twice won France's César Award for Best Foreign Film, as well as the Palme d'Or at the Cannes Film Festival and the Golden Lion for Lifetime Achievement at the Venice Film Festival. In 2017, The MacDowell Colony awarded Lynch The Edward MacDowell Medal for outstanding contributions to American culture.

| Year | Title | Academy Awards | | BAFTA Awards | | Golden Globe Awards | |
| Year | Title | Nominations | Wins | Nominations | Wins | Nominations | Wins |
|---|---|---|---|---|---|---|---|
| 1980 | The Elephant Man | 8 | | 7 | 3 | 4 | |
| 1984 | Dune | 1 | | | | | |
| 1986 | Blue Velvet | 1 | | | | 2 | |
| 1990 | Wild at Heart | 1 | | 1 | | 1 | |
| 1999 | The Straight Story | 1 | | | | 2 | |
| 2001 | Mulholland Drive | 1 | | 2 | 1 | 4 | |
| Total | | 15 | | 10 | 4 | 15 | |

Directed Academy Award performances

Under Lynch's direction, these actors have received Academy Award nominations for their performances in their respective roles.

| Year | Performer | Film | Result |
|---|---|---|---|
Academy Award for Best Actor
| 1980 | John Hurt | The Elephant Man | Nominated |
| 1999 | Richard Farnsworth | The Straight Story | Nominated |
Academy Award for Best Supporting Actress
| 1990 | Diane Ladd | Wild at Heart | Nominated |

== Discography ==
Studio albums

- BlueBOB (2001)
- Crazy Clown Time (2011)
- The Big Dream (2013)

Collaborative albums

- Lux Vivens (with Jocelyn Montgomery) (1998)
- BlueBOB (with John Neff) (2001)
- The Air Is On Fire (with Dean Hurley) (2007)
- Polish Night Music (with Marek Zebrowski) (2007)
- This Train (with Chrystabell) (2011)
- Somewhere in the Nowhere (with Chrystabell) (2016)
- Thought Gang (with Angelo Badalamenti) (recorded 1992/93) (2018)
- Cellophane Memories (with Chrystabell) (2024)

== Solo exhibitions ==
- 1967: Vanderlip Gallery, Philadelphia
- 1983: Puerto Vallarta, Mexico
- 1987: James Corcoran Gallery, Los Angeles
- 1989: Leo Castelli Gallery, New York
- 1990: Tavelli Gallery, Aspen
- 1991: Museum of Contemporary Art Tokyo
- 1992: Sala Parpallo, Valencia
- 1993: James Corcoran Gallery, Los Angeles
- 1995: Painting Pavilion, Open Air Museum, Hakone
- 1996: Park Tower Hall, Tokyo
- 1997: Galerie Piltzer, Paris
- 2007: Fondation Cartier pour l'Art Contemporain, Paris
- 2008: Epson Kunstbetrieb, Düsseldorf
- 2009: Max-Ernst-Museum, Brühl
- 2010: Mönchehaus Museum, Goslar
- 2010: GL Strand, Copenhagen
- 2012: Galerie Chelsea, Sylt
- 2012: Galerie Pfefferle, Munich
- 2013: Galerie Barbara von Stechow, Frankfurt
- 2014: The Photographers' Gallery, London
- 2014: Middlesbrough Institute of Modern Art
- 2014/15: Pennsylvania Academy of the Fine Arts, Philadelphia
- 2015: Queensland Gallery of Modern Art, Brisbane
- 2017: Centre of Contemporary Art Znaki Czasu, Toruń, Poland
- 2018: Kayne Griffin Corcoran, Los Angeles
- 2018/19: Bonnefantenmuseum, Maastricht, The Netherlands
- 2019: Home, Manchester, United Kingdom
- 2019: Sperone Westwater Gallery, New York
- 2021/22: Nikolaj Contemporary Art Center, Copenhagen

== Bibliography ==
- ——; McKenna, Kristine (2018). Room to Dream. New York: Random House. ISBN 978-0-399-58919-5. Archived from the original on May 30, 2023.
- David Lynch: The Art of the Real, the website of a 2012 Berlin conference on the artistic work of David Lynch with all lectures in text form.
- Cozzolino, Robert; Rockwell, Alethea (2014). David Lynch: The Unified Field. Oakland: University of California Press. ISBN 978-0-520-28396-1.
- Nochimson, Martha (1997). The Passion of David Lynch: Wild at Heart in Hollywood. Austin: University of Texas Press. ISBN 978-0-292-75566-6. Archived from the original on January 25, 2025.
- Hughes, David (2001). The Complete Lynch. London: Virgin. ISBN 978-0-7535-0598-4. Archived from the original on August 16, 2025.
- Woods, Paul A. (2000). Weirdsville USA: The Obsessive Universe of David Lynch. London: Plexus. ISBN 978-0-85965-291-9.
- Kaleta, Kenneth C. (1995). David Lynch. Twayne's filmmakers series. New York: Twayne. ISBN 978-0-8057-9323-9.
- Johnson, Jeff (2004). Pervert in the Pulpit: Morality in the Works of David Lynch. Jefferson, N.C.: McFarland & Company. ISBN 978-0-7864-1753-7. Archived from the original on January 23, 2025.
- ——, ed. (2007). Snowmen: David Lynch (in French). Göttingen: Steidl. ISBN 978-3-86521-467-6.
- Olson, Greg (2008). David Lynch: Beautiful Dark. Filmmakers. Lanham, Md: Scarecrow Press. ISBN 978-0-8108-5917-3. OCLC 212410238. Archived from the original on January 22, 2025.
- Mactaggart, Allister (2010). The Film Paintings of David Lynch: Challenging Film Theory. Bristol; Chicago: Intellect. ISBN 978-1-84150-332-5.
- Fossali, Pierluigi Basso (2006). Interpretazione Tra Mondi: il Pensiero Figurale di David Lynch (in Italian). Pisa: ETS. ISBN 978-88-467-1671-2.
- Bertetto, Paolo (2008). David Lynch (in Italian). Venezia: Marsilio. ISBN 978-88-317-9393-3.
- Seknadje, Enrique (2010). David Lynch: Un Cinéma du Maléfique. Camion noir. Rosières-en-Haye: Camion blanc. ISBN 978-2-35779-086-5. Archived from the original on August 19, 2025.
- Gleyzon, François-Xavier (2010). David Lynch in Theory. Prague: Univerzita Karlova v Praze. ISBN 978-80-7308-317-5.
- Chion, Michel; Lynch, David K. (2006). David Lynch (2nd ed.). London: BFI. ISBN 978-1-84457-030-0.
- Barzegar, Ebrahim (July 13, 2015). "Mulholland Drive: An Intertextual Reading". CINEJ Cinema Journal. 4 (1): 62–78. doi:10.5195/cinej.2014.114. ISSN 2158-8724.
- Barzegar, Ebrahim (November 11, 2016). "Labyrinths and Illusions in David Lynch's Mulholland Drive and Inland Empire". CINEJ Cinema Journal. 5 (2): 168–188. doi:10.5195/cinej.2016.150. ISSN 2158-8724.
