= Cellophane Memories =

Studio album by Chrystabell and David Lynch
- Released: August 2, 2024
- Length: 37:33
- Label: Sacred Bones
- Producer: David Lynch

Chrystabell and David Lynch chronology
Somewhere in the Nowhere (2016)	Cellophane Memories (2024)

Chrystabell chronology
Midnight Star (2022)	Cellophane Memories (2024)

David Lynch chronology
Thought Gang (2018)	Cellophane Memories (2024)

Singles from Cellophane Memories
- 1. "Sublime Eternal Love" Released: June 5, 2024; 2. "The Answers to the Questions" Released: July 9, 2024

Professional ratings
Aggregate scores
Source	Rating
Metacritic	77/100
Review scores
Source	Rating
AllMusic	4/5 stars
The Daily Telegraph	3/5 stars
The Independent	3/5 stars
The Irish Times	2.5/5 stars
Paste	5.9/10
Pitchfork	7.3/10
The Skinny	4/5 stars
Under the Radar	8.5/10

Cellophane Memories is the third collaborative studio album by Chrystabell and David Lynch. The album was released by Sacred Bones Records on August 2, 2024. The album also features posthumous credits from composer Angelo Badalamenti, who contributes synths to "She Knew" and "So Much Love." Released five months before his death in January 2025, it was Lynch's final project.

== Background and release ==
The album is the third collaborative album by Chrystabell and Lynch after This Train (2011) and Somewhere in the Nowhere (2016).

"On a starry night, David Lynch was taking a walk through the dark woods when he witnessed a flood of bright light coming over the tops of the trees. The otherworldly vision was the seed for Cellophane Memories".

Lynch first teased the project in a cryptic video message posted to X on May 27, 2024. The album was officially announced on June 5, alongside the release of the song "Sublime Eternal Love" and an accompanying video directed by Lynch. "The Answers to the Questions" was released on July 9, 2024, with an animated music video directed by Lynch.

== Track listing ==
All tracks are written by David Lynch and Chrysta Bell Zucht, except where noted.

No.	Title	Length
1.	"She Knew" (Lynch, Zucht, Angelo Badalementi)	3:12
2.	"The Sky Falls"	3:50
3.	"You Know the Rest"	3:16
4.	"So Much Love" (Lynch, Zucht, Badalamenti)	3:51
5.	"Two Lovers Kiss"	3:19
6.	"The Answers to the Questions" (Lynch, Zucht, Dean Hurley)	5:50
7.	"With Small Animals"	3:19
8.	"Reflections in a Blade" (Lynch, Zucht, Hurley)	4:02
9.	"Dance of Light"	4:08
10.	"Sublime Eternal Love"	2:46
Total length:		37:33

== Personnel ==
- Chrystabell – vocals, mixing, engineering
- David Lynch – synthesizer, guitar, production, mixing, arrangement
- Angelo Badalamenti – synthesizer
- Dean Hurley – bass, drums
- Brian Lucey – mastering

== Charts ==
Chart performance for Cellophane Memories
Chart (2024)	Peak position
UK Independent Albums (Official Charts)	11

== Reception ==
In his review for Pitchfork, Marc Weidenbaum stated, "It’s difficult to listen to the layered vocals on Cellophane Memories and not think of the roles that mirrors and fractured identities play in Lynch films. The layering is so persistent that it’s unclear if that consistency signals conceptual coherence or extended sameness".

Writing for Paste Peyton Toubs was very mixed about the result of the collaboration and described the album as a "painfully abstract offering" while Helen Brown, of The Independent, in a more positive review, called it "an enigma wrapped in a synth".

A 4 stars out of 5 in Le Soir wrote, "Between fairy tales, mountain peaks, swimming pools, twilight highways and dark rooms, the two artists weave a supernatural universe between romance and solitude."

== See also ==
- Inland Empire (film), Lynch's 2006 film whose soundtrack contains a song by the two artists, "Polish Poem"
