= Cultural impact of David Lynch =

Cultural impact of American filmmaker

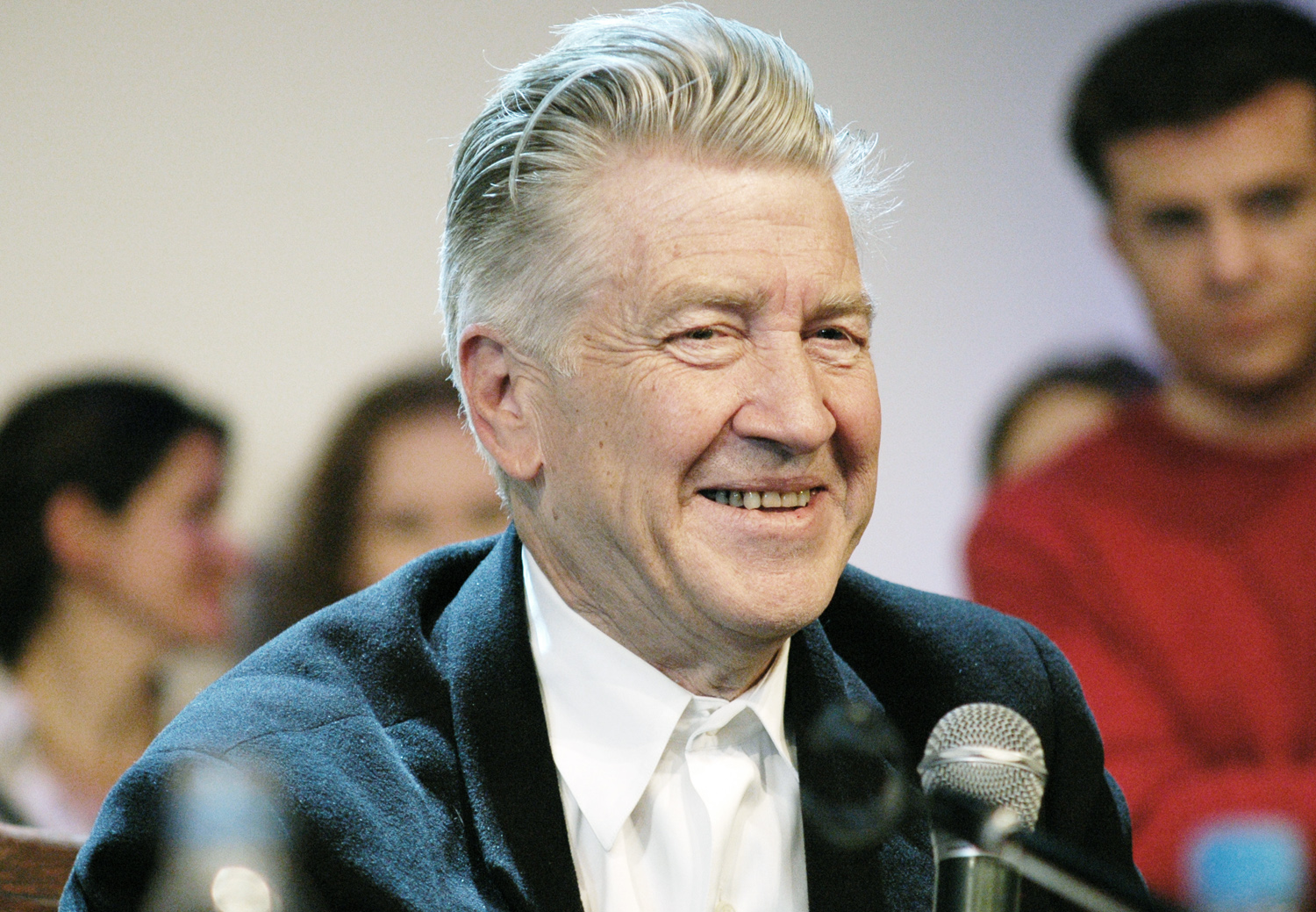
Lynch in 2009

American filmmaker, visual artist, musician, and actor David Lynch (1946–2025) is widely regarded as one of the greatest and most influential filmmakers in the history of cinema. (Note: Attributed to multiple sources.) Lynch was often called a "visionary" and was acclaimed for films often distinguished by their surrealist qualities. In a career spanning more than 50 years, he received numerous accolades, including the Golden Lion for Lifetime Achievement at the Venice Film Festival in 2006 and an Honorary Academy Award in 2019.

== The term "Lynchian" ==
The adjective Lynchian came into use to describe works or situations reminiscent of his art, with the Oxford English Dictionary noting his penchant for "juxtaposing surreal or sinister elements with mundane, everyday environments, and for using compelling visual images to emphasize a dreamlike quality of mystery or menace".

His obsessions with dreams and female identities were influenced by films like The Wizard of Oz (which was explored in the 2022 documentary Lynch/Oz) and Ingmar Bergman's Persona.

== Awards and nominations ==
Over his career Lynch won an Honorary Academy Award, two prizes from the Cannes Film Festival and the Golden Lion as well as nominations for two BAFTA Awards, nine Primetime Emmy Awards, four Golden Globe Awards, and a Screen Actors Guild Award.

Lynch's oeuvre encompasses work in both cinema and television. He received three nominations for the Academy Award for Best Director for his work on the biographical drama The Elephant Man (1980), the neo-noir Blue Velvet (1986), and his surrealist thriller Mulholland Drive (2000), and was also nominated for Best Adapted Screenplay for the former. He won the Cannes Film Festival's Palme d'Or for his romance film Wild at Heart (1990). He also directed the space opera Dune (1984), the drama The Straight Story (1999), the surrealist crime drama Lost Highway (1997), and the experimental thriller Inland Empire (2006).

Lynch whilst his television debut, with the ABC mystery-horror series Twin Peaks (1990–1991) which earned five Primetime Emmy Award nominations for its first season (Lynch was nominated for Outstanding Directing for a Drama Series and Outstanding Writing for a Drama Series) alongside a win for Golden Globe Award for Best Television Series – Drama. Lynch made a prequel film Twin Peaks: Fire Walk with Me (1992) and revival series Twin Peaks: The Return (2017). Indeed, the surreal and in many cases violent elements to his films have earned them the reputation that they "disturb, offend or mystify" their audiences.

In the course of his career, Lynch has received multiple awards and nominations. He received the Academy Honorary Award from the Academy of Motion Picture Arts and Sciences in 2019. Lynch has twice won France's César Award for Best Foreign Film, as well as the Palme d'Or and Best Director Prizes at the Cannes Film Festival and a Golden Lion award for lifetime achievement at the Venice Film Festival.

The French government has awarded him the Legion of Honour, the country's top civilian distinction, honoring him first as a Chevalier in 2002 and then as an Officier in 2009; Lynch was also awarded the key to the city of Bydgoszcz, Poland. In 2017, Lynch was awarded The Edward MacDowell Medal by The MacDowell Colony for outstanding contributions to American culture.

== Influence ==
Lynch was often called a "visionary" over the course of his career. In 2007, a panel of critics convened by The Guardian announced that "after all the discussion, no one could fault the conclusion that David Lynch is the most important film-maker of the current era", and AllMovie called him "the Renaissance man of modern American filmmaking". Film critic Pauline Kael called Lynch "the first populist surrealist".

The moving image collection of David Lynch is held at the Academy Film Archive, which has preserved two of his student films.

The term "Lynchian" has been used to describe art or situations reminiscent of Lynch's style. The Oxford English Dictionary further defines Lynchian artwork as "juxtaposing surreal or sinister elements with mundane, everyday environments, and for using compelling visual images to emphasize a dreamlike quality of mystery or menace." David Foster Wallace wrote, "An academic definition of Lynchian might be that the term 'refers to a particular kind of irony where the very macabre and the very mundane combine in such a way as to reveal the former's perpetual containment within the latter'" but that "it's ultimately definable only ostensively—i.e., we know it when we see it."

While the series Twin Peaks is not usually described as science fiction, it has been noted to have been influential on that genre.

In 2018, the mayors of Snoqualmie and North Bend, which were both used for filming the series, declared Twin Peaks Day to be held on February 24. That was in recognition of the date mentioned in the first episode of the series.

=== Television industry ===
Writing for The Atlantic in 2016, Mike Mariani wrote that "It would be tough to look at the roster of television shows any given season without finding several that owe a creative debt to Twin Peaks," stating that "Lynch's manipulation of the uncanny, his surreal non-sequiturs, his black humor, and his trademark ominous tracking shots can be felt in a variety of contemporary hit shows." The X-Files notably takes major inspiration from Twin Peaks especially in execution of atmosphere and attempts to blend comedic moments and horror. David Duchovny appeared as Denise Bryson in Twin Peaks, prior to his role as Fox Mulder on The X-Files.

In an interview celebrating the third season, David Chase, the creator of The Sopranos, stated that "Anybody making one-hour drama[s] today who says he wasn't influenced by David Lynch is lying." In 2010, the television series Psych paid tribute to the series by reuniting some of the cast in the fifth-season episode "Dual Spires". Carlton Cuse, the co-creator of Bates Motel, cited Twin Peaks as a key inspiration for his series, stating, "We pretty much ripped off Twin Peaks." Cuse and Damon Lindelof, who both co-produced Lost, cited both Twin Peaks and David Lynch as a major influence on their work. Lindelof stated "There is no show in television history that had more impact on me than Twin Peaks." Noah Hawley, creator of Fargo and Legion, cited Twin Peaks as a major inspiration on his work, particularly Fargo. Roberto Aguirre-Sacasa, the creator of Riverdale, remarked that "all roads on Riverdale lead back to Twin Peaks" given its thematic similarities.

The TV series Atlanta has been cited by its creator, Donald Glover, as being inspired by the show, labeling it as "Twin Peaks with rappers." Additionally, the animated series Gravity Falls repeatedly referenced the Black Lodge along with other elements of Twin Peaks throughout its run. Critics have also noted similarities and borrowed elements from Lynch's Fire Walk with Me and Twin Peaks in Veena Sud's American adaptation of The Killing. Baran bo Odar, the co-creator of the German Netflix series Dark, has named Twin Peaks as a key influence on the show. Both featuring dark, surrealist themes and an ensemble cast of "curious characters".

=== Music ===
The score of Twin Peaks, helmed by Angelo Badalamenti, Julee Cruise, and David Lynch, was a notable influence for many genres of music, specifically dream pop. Cruise's compositions inspired the likes of Lana Del Rey and the score of the show was a direct inspiration for dream pop duo Beach House, who have a history of paying homage to the show. The show's legacy of honoring dream pop and indie rock compositions is observed in the third season, with its inclusion of performances from contemporaries such as Sharon Van Etten, Nine Inch Nails, and The Veils. Additionally, its surrealism and open-ended narrative influenced English musician David Bowie's 1995 rock opera Outside.

Bands like Bastille have penned songs in honor of the show like "Laura Palmer", which was influenced by the "slightly weird, eerie" atmosphere of the show. Xiu Xiu completed and released a 2017 tribute album titled "Plays the Music of Twin Peaks", where they performed several tracks from the show's main soundtrack and leaned into a more experimental sound.

Outside of Twin Peaks, the soundtrack for Lynch’s first feature film, Eraserhead, has been called "one of the founding documents of industrial music". Charlie Fox for The Quietus described it as anticipating the crossover of "industrial and ambient pursued by Coil and Zoviet France". The blurring of the line between film score and sound design has also led to its influence being felt in ‘non-music’ subgenres like noise, drone, and dark ambient. The way the heavily reverberated organ music of jazz pianist Fats Waller is used during the film "feels like a precursor to the 'hauntological' music" of The Caretaker.

Trent Reznor has cited the soundtrack as an influence, saying "around the time I was starting to formulate Nine Inch Nails I went back to really examine the sound effects and music of Eraserhead, which had a huge impact on our sound and how it makes you feel a certain way."

The song sung by the Eraserhead character Lady In The Radiator, "In Heaven", has been covered by many artists including; Devo, Tuxedomoon with Winston Tong, Bauhaus, Pixies, and Zola Jesus.

Other musicians influenced by Lynch's works include Chelsea Wolfe, Dirty Beaches, Sky Ferreira, Karen O, Jim James, and The Flaming Lips.

=== Video games ===
Twin Peaks and Lynch's overall work also influenced a number of survival horror and psychological thriller video games, most notably the Silent Hill series and games produced by Sam Lake at Remedy Entertainment such as Max Payne, Alan Wake, and Control. For Alan Wake II, Remedy took heavy inspiration from the third season of Twin Peaks specifically.

Twin Peaks served as an inspiration for The Legend of Zelda: Link's Awakening, with director Takashi Tezuka citing the series as the main factor for the creation of the "suspicious" characters that populate the game, as well as the mystery elements of the story. Mizzurna Falls was highly reminiscent of, and an homage to, Twin Peaks.

The Velvet Room featured in the Persona series is inspired by the Black Lodge of Twin Peaks, and is also a reference to Lynch's film Blue Velvet. Other games influenced by Twin Peaks include Deadly Premonition, the Life Is Strange series, Disco Elysium, Virginia, Kentucky Route Zero, Thimbleweed Park, and Puzzle Agent.

=== In other media ===
Inland Empire heavily influenced the analog horror webseries Petscop. Several critics compared Ian Tripp's sophomore feature film Sincerely Saul to Eraserhead, with Daniel M. Kimmel writing that it was reminiscent of seeing a midnight screening of Lynch's early work.

== Tributes ==
Upon his death, Lynch's collaborators Nicolas Cage, Laura Dern, Kyle MacLachlan, Naomi Watts, and Ray Wise wrote tributes to him. MacLachlan honored Lynch with tributes in The New York Times, GQ, and on his Instagram account, where he wrote, "My world is that much fuller because I knew him and that much emptier now that he's gone." The WGA announced that MacLachlan would posthumously give Lynch the Laurel Award for Screenwriting Achievement.

Steven Spielberg wrote of directing Lynch in The Fabelmans: "Here was one of my heroes—David Lynch—playing one of my heroes [...] The world is going to miss such an original and unique voice. His films have already stood the test of time and they always will." Martin Scorsese wrote a statement that read in part, "He put images on the screen unlike anything that I or anybody else had ever seen—he made everything strange, uncanny, revelatory and new." Tributes were also paid by Judd Apatow, Mel Brooks, Francis Ford Coppola, Terry Gilliam, James Gunn, Ron Howard, Patton Oswalt, Pedro Pascal, Billy Corgan, Questlove, and Ben Stiller. Critic Peter Bradshaw of The Guardian eulogized Lynch as "the great American surrealist". Mel Brooks, who produced The Elephant Man, called Lynch "Jimmy Stewart from Mars." Lynch described himself as "Eagle Scout, Missoula, Montana".

J. Hoberman wrote, "Like Frank Capra and Franz Kafka, two widely disparate 20th-century artists whose work Mr. Lynch much admired and might be said to have synthesized, his name became an adjective."
