= David Lynch Compound =

Primary residence of David lynch

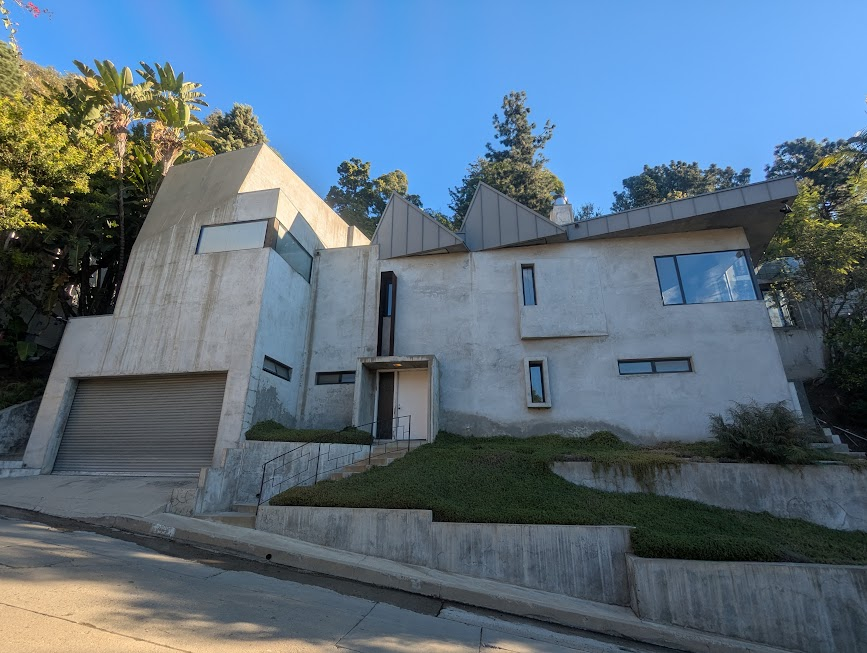
- The building at 7035 Senalda Drive, seen in Lost Highway

General information
- Type: Residential home
- Architectural style: Mid-century modern
- Location: 7017, 7029, and 7035 Senalda Drive, Los Angeles, California
- Completed: 1967

Technical details
- Floor area: 11,000 sq. ft.

Design and construction
- Architects: Lloyd Wright, Eric Lloyd Wright, David Lynch

The David Lynch Compound collectively refers to several buildings on Senalda Road in the west Hollywood Hills neighborhood of Los Angeles, previously owned by filmmaker David Lynch until his death in 2025. The compound consists of eight buildings designed by Lloyd Wright, Eric Lloyd Wright, and Lynch. The three main buildings at 7017, 7029, and 7035 Senalda Road were designed by Lloyd Wright in 1963. Wright's son Eric collaborated with Lynch on the design and construction of several additional buildings after Lynch purchased the compound in the 1990s. Lynch notably shot scenes for the film Lost Highway (1997) at the compound.

== History ==
Lloyd Wright, the son of famed architect Frank Lloyd Wright, designed the three properties in 1963, with construction finishing in 1967. The property at 7017 Senalda Drive is known as the Beverly Johnson House, which the City of Los Angeles' Historic Places LA directory states is an "excellent example of Mid-Century Modern/Organic residential architecture". The house has a distinctive pink color and triangular façade decorations which are seen throughout the exterior and interior of the compound.

Though the three properties were not built as a single unit, they were all acquired by filmmaker David Lynch in the early 1990s. In 1991, Lynch commissioned Eric Lloyd Wright, the son of Lloyd Wright, to design a pool and a pool house for the compound, which was built on the hill abutting the Beverly Johnson House to the north. The compound is likely the only site with architectural contributions by both Eric Lloyd Wright and Lloyd Wright, with real estate agent Marc Silver stating it had "rare multi-generational Wright lineage" in his 2025 listing of the property. Additionally, Lynch reportedly designed several elements of the compound himself while living there, including a two-story guest house and one-bedroom living space.

Lynch raised his family at the compound, living there while married to his third wife Mary Sweeney and fourth wife Emily Stofle. He also used the compound for creative pursuits such as shooting and editing films, painting, and woodworking. In 1993, he established Asymmetrical Productions at 7029 Senalda Drive. The company would produce films such as Mulholland Drive (2001), Inland Empire (2006), and the television series Twin Peaks, all of which Lynch directed. Lynch also had a recording studio and editing bay in the property at 7035 Senalda Drive. He maintained a workshop on the compound for woodworking. He would often post videos on his YouTube channel of the various home improvement projects he was creating, and built some of the compound's furniture himself.

On January 9, 2025, Lynch evacuated the compound due to the Southern California wildfires, which exacerbated his health issues and led to his death six days later at his daughter Jennifer's house. Jennifer later revealed that Lynch's will included directions to immediately sell the compound as a single property and, after taxes, split the proceeds evenly between Jennifer and her three siblings.

In September 2025 the compound was listed for sale at $15 million and sold in March 2026 for $13 million. The compound is not open to the public and is censored on Google Street View.

== Use in Lynch's films ==
Lynch filmed several short films at the compound, as well as several scenes for his film Lost Highway (1997). In Lost Highway, the property at 7035 Senalda Drive serves as the residence of the film's main characters, played by Bill Pullman and Patricia Arquette. Lynch included much of his home's furniture in the film, which he built.

Several short films directed by Lynch were filmed and edited at the house, including David Lynch Cooks Quinoa (2006), Out Yonder – Neighbor Boy (2002), and his "Weather Report" series.

== Gallery ==
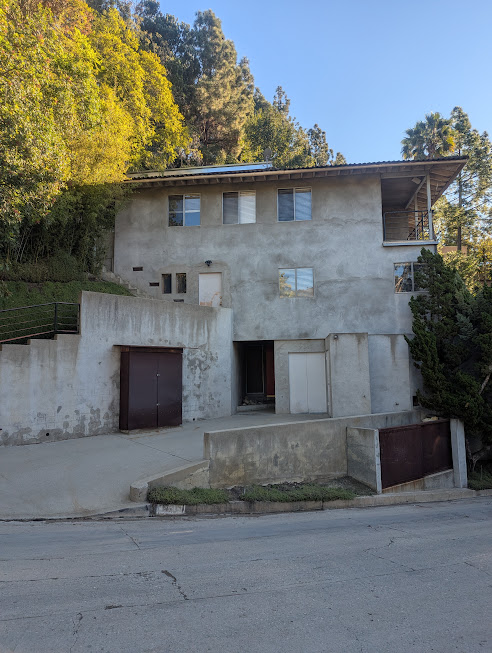
The building at 7029 Senalda Drive, headquarters of Asymmetrical Productions.

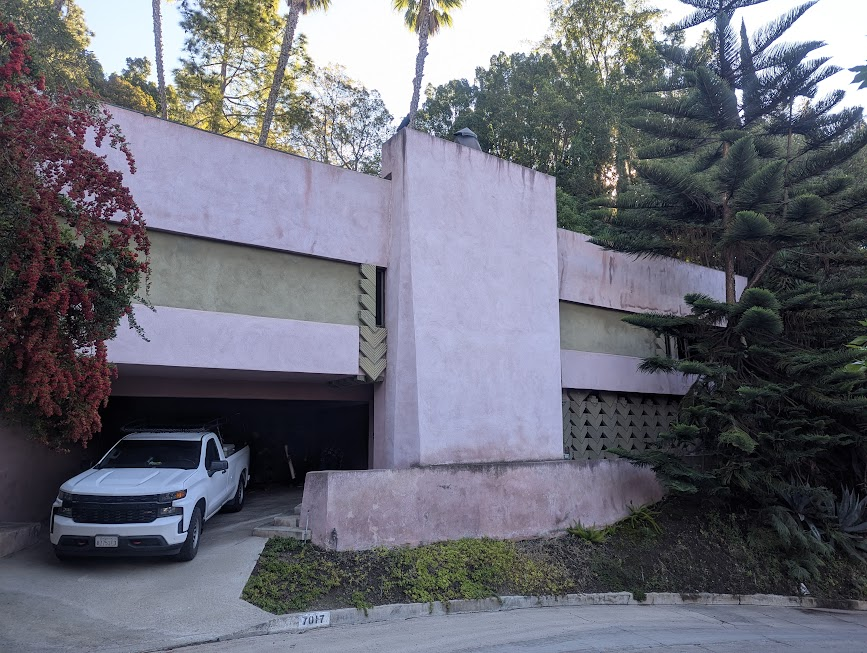
The building at 7017 Senalda Drive, The Beverly Johnson House.

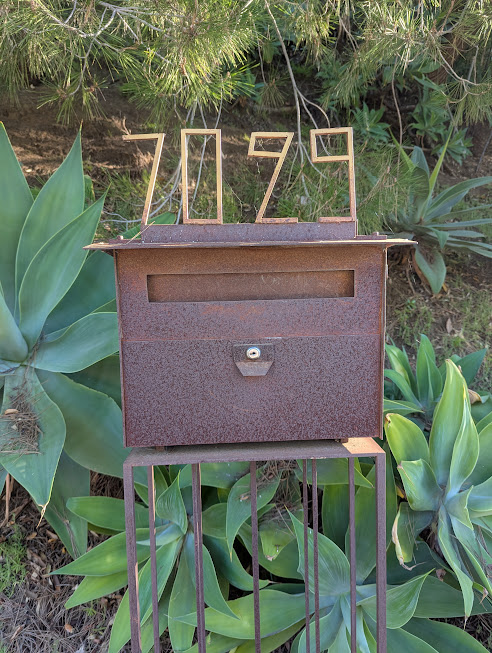
Mailbox for 7029 Senalda Drive.

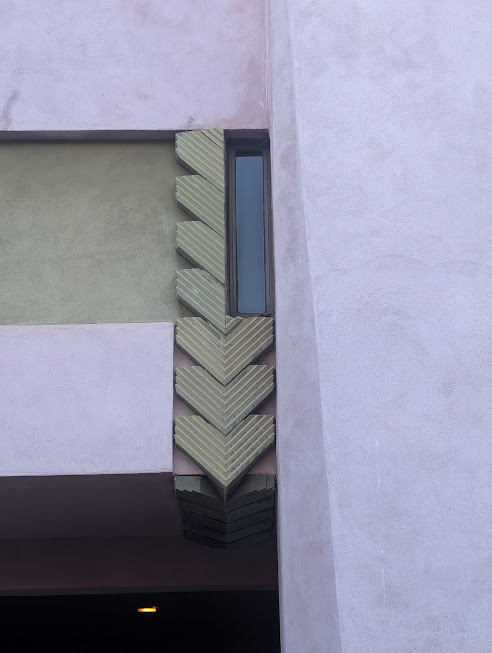
Detail of the Beverly Johnson House.
