= Idem Paris =

2013 film by David Lynch

- Title card
- Directed by: David Lynch
- Edited by: Noriko Miyakawa
- Release date: February 4, 2013
- Running time: 8 minutes
- Countries: France; United States

Idem Paris is a 2013 documentary short film, directed by David Lynch. Filmed at the eponymous Idem Paris, a fine art printing studio in Paris, France, and "virtually wordless", it documents the lithographic process. The film was edited by Noriko Miyakawa and mixed by Dean Hurley.

Idem Paris was shot on high definition digital video, presented in black-and-white and released on YouTube. Critics drew comparisons between Idem Paris and Lynch's debut feature film, 1977's Eraserhead, noting that both had "high-contrast black and white images, the focus on specific machinery, and the clanking and hissing array of sounds."

== Background ==
Describing the background of the film, Lynch said:

Hervé Chandès from the Fondation Cartier brought me over to Idem and introduced me to Patrice Forest. I see this incredible place, and I get the opportunity to work there. And this was like a dream! It just opened up this brand-new world of the lithography and the magic of lithography, the magic of the stones. And it was a great, great thing! This thing of lithography, this channel of lithography opened up and a bunch of ideas came flowing out and it led to about a hundred lithographs. I will say that Idem printing studio has a unique, very special mood, and it is so conducive to creating. Patrice has the greatest attitude for all the artists and he creates this space of freedom and this joy of creating. It's so beautiful! And I think the place is very important—in other words, the same stone could be moved to another place, and I think that the work that comes out would be different. It's a combination of the stone, the place, the people, this mood, and out comes these certain ideas.
