= Eric Lloyd Wright =

American architect (1929–2023)

- Born: November 8, 1929; Los Angeles, California, U.S.
- Died: March 13, 2023 (aged 93)
- Education: University of California, Los Angeles
- Occupation: Architect
- Years active: 1948–2023
- Known for: Restoration of buildings by Frank Lloyd Wright
- Spouse: Mary Wright
- Children: 2 sons
- Parent(s): Frank Lloyd Wright Jr. Helen Taggart
- Relatives: Frank Lloyd Wright (grandfather); John Lloyd Wright (uncle); Elizabeth Wright Ingraham (cousin); Anne Baxter (cousin); Rupert Pole (half-brother)

Eric Lloyd Wright (November 8, 1929 – March 13, 2023) was an American architect, son of Frank Lloyd Wright Jr. and the grandson of the famed Frank Lloyd Wright.

== Early life and education ==
Wright was born in Los Angeles on November 8, 1929, to Helen Taggart and Lloyd Wright (Frank Lloyd Wright Jr.). His father was a landscape architect and architect who was the eldest son of Frank Lloyd Wright Sr. Educated at the University of California, Los Angeles, Eric worked in his grandfather's (1948–1956) and father's (1956–1978) firm as an apprentice. He received his license as an architect in 1967, before establishing his own firm, Eric Lloyd Wright Architecture and Planning, in 1978. Eric lived in Topanga, California, before moving to his last residence above Malibu, on land that his father, Lloyd Wright, assembled. The land was cleared of brush by Rupert Pole (Eric's half brother), Anaïs Nin (Eric's sister-in-law), Eric, the office staff, Lloyd and Helen, and they often used it as a picnic spot before Lloyd died in 1978.

== Career and philosophy in architecture ==
"Wright’s early education as his grandfather’s apprentice at Taliesin and Taliesin West from 1948 to 1956 allowed him to partake in iconic projects such as New York’s Guggenheim Museum and Monona Terrace in Madison, Wisconsin." He worked in his father's firm in Hollywood, California, until 1978 when his father died. Then he began his own firm of architects and planners.

Eric Lloyd Wright Architecture and Planning do design and building, and Wright also led a nonprofit called Wright Organic Resource Center. The firm's focus is on residences, often working with other architecture firms for final construction. He had worked on larger projects, including the Sunset Community High School. He followed the concept put forth by his grandfather, termed Organic Architecture. "This “organic” concept not only predates the green-building trend of the past decade but also established the ideas that would come to be accepted as common sense concepts of smart design."

The nonprofit Center provides educational programs on the grounds, which also include his home and the offices of his firm. The 24-acre site was purchased by his father in 1956, but never developed. Wright inherited the land from his father, and he had developed it slowly over the years, first as an office, and beginning in 1984, as his home.

Most of Wright's work is in the United States. In 1995 he worked on housing in Japan, and in 1993 he helped established Chi-Am Group Incorporated and Chi-Am Consortium, two Chinese-American architectural firms.

Many of his personal and architectural records were burned in a 1993 fire at his home. He donated the papers and records of his father and grandfather to the University of California at Los Angeles prior to that, where they are safe from fires.

== Personal life and death ==
Wright lived with his wife Mary, a watercolor artist. They met in 1960 in Los Angeles. They had two sons.

Wright died on March 13, 2023, at the age of 93.

== Restoring Frank Lloyd Wright buildings ==
Wright was responsible for a number of restoration projects to his grandfather's buildings:

- Storer Residence - Los Angeles, California
- Ennis Residence - Los Angeles, California
- Auldbrass Plantation - Yemassee, South Carolina
- Eric Lloyd Wright Boulder House - an adaptation of an original design by his grandfather in Malibu, California
- Greer Ranch - Murrietta, California
- Murrietta Oaks - Murrietta, California

== Other projects ==
Other projects by Wright include:

- Walker Residence, Carmel, California
- Guggenheim Museum, New York, New York
- Gerald B. and Beverley Tonkens House, Cincinnati, Ohio
- Monona Terrace, Madison, Wisconsin
- Wayfarer’s Chapel, Rancho Palos Verdes, California
- First Christian Church, Thousand Oaks, California
- The Good Shepherd Church, Des Plaines, Illinois
- The Institute of Mental Physics Joshua Tree, California
- Student & Faculty Housing Project for U.C., San Diego, California
- Solar Farms Project, Farming & Education, Apple Valley, California
- Thatcher Building, Glendale, California
- Ruth Ross Residence, Silverlake, Los Angeles, California
- Bernard H. Soffer Residence, Pacific Palisades, Los Angeles, California
- Humane Society Animal Shelter and Office, Ojai, California
- Swedenborgian Church Conference Center, West Chester, Pennsylvania
- Visitor Center for The Wayfarer's Chapel Palos Verdes, California - as consultant to Dean Andrews
- Tenemos Conference Center Dormitory for the Swedenborgian Church, West Chester, Pennsylvania - with Jay Cooperson
- Santaranta House, a private villa in Heinola, Finland
- David Lynch Compound, Los Angeles, California
