= Thought Gang =

2018 album by Angelo Badalamenti and David Lynch

Studio album by Angelo Badalamenti and David Lynch
- Released: November 2, 2018
- Recorded: 1991, May 1992–May 1993
- Studio: Cherokee Studios in Los Angeles
- Genre: Free jazz; experimental; spoken word
- Length: 59:15
- Label: Sacred Bones
- Producer: Angelo Badalamenti; David Lynch

Thought Gang is a studio album by American composers Angelo Badalamenti and David Lynch created under the joint moniker Thought Gang. Though released on November 2, 2018 through Sacred Bones Records, Thought Gang was originally recorded in the early 1990s. The album was preceded by a Lynch-directed music video for "A Real Indication" on November 1, 2018. The video was created in 1992 in the 8mm video format.

== Background ==
In 1991, Angelo Badalamenti and David Lynch decided to form the jazz project Thought Gang. The short-lived effort lasted through 1993 and led to two tracks included on the soundtrack for Lynch's Twin Peaks: Fire Walk with Me (1992) and a few scattered pieces on other Lynch films, like 2001's Mulholland Drive and 2006's Inland Empire. On September 18, 2018, it was announced that a previously unreleased album under the title Thought Gang would be released on November 2 of that year. Lynch described Thought Gang as "a grand experiment", and Kory Grow of Rolling Stone called the music experimental free jazz with spoken word elements.

== Critical reception ==
Professional ratings
Aggregate scores
Source	Rating
Metacritic	70/100
Review scores
Source	Rating
AllMusic	3.5/5 stars
Exclaim!	7/10
Pitchfork	6.2/10
Rolling Stone	3.5/5 stars
Sputnikmusic	3.5/5

Thought Gang was met with mostly positive reception. The album received an average score of 70/100 from 5 reviews on Metacritic, indicating "generally favorable reviews". AllMusic's Bekki Bemrose acknowledged the difficulty and eccentricity of the music but recommended it to hardcore fans of Lynch and Badalamenti. She went on to write that the album's greatest asset is its "sound of two old friends having a great deal of mischievous fun". Andy Beta of Pitchfork expressed mixed feelings on the strangeness of the music (especially Badalamenti's spoken word vocals) and wrote, "As frightful and bewildering as a Dion McGregor nightmare, Thought Gang reveals Lynch and Badalamenti’s shared drive to disrupt any through line or logical outcome, the sounds and words as baffling as dream logic". Kory Grow of Rolling Stone described the album as "unpredictable and uneven but also strangely compelling", echoing the sentiment of other reviewers that the music is at once magnetic and repulsive. Writing for Exclaim!, Jenna McClelland described the album as "for lovers of non-expositional storytelling, crude mystery, lipstick-red esoteric jazz, and noise".

== Legacy ==
In August 2021, American experimental band Xiu Xiu released a cover of "A Real Indication" along with new merchandise depicting the cover of their Twin Peaks cover album Plays the Music of Twin Peaks.

== Track listing ==
All songs written by Angelo Badalamenti and David Lynch.

No.	Title	Length
1.	"Stalin Revisited"	2:02
2.	"Logic and Common Sense"	3:34
3.	"One Dog Bark"	3:07
4.	"Woodcutters from Fiery Ships"	4:35
5.	"A Real Indication"	5:34
6.	"Jack Paints it Red"	3:40
7.	"A Meaningless Conversation"	3:13
8.	"Frank 2000 Prelude"	1:53
9.	"Mult-Tempo Wind Boogie"	4:09
10.	"The Black Dog Runs at Night"	1:45
11.	"Frank 2000"	16:41
12.	"Summer Night Noise"	9:02
Total length:		59:15

== Personnel ==
All credits adapted from Thought Gang liner notes

Thought Gang

- Angelo Badalamenti – vocals, synths, piano, production
- David Lynch – lyrics, percussion, production, vocals, synths, guitar, mixing

Additional musicians

- Reggie Hamilton – acoustic bass, electric bass, guitar
- Gerry Brown – drums, percussion
- Tom Rainer – keyboards, clarinet, saxophone

Technical personnel

- Bruce Robb – engineering, mixing
- John Karpowich – engineering
- Josh Achziger – assistive engineering
- Mike Gibson – assistive engineering
- Mike Bozzi – mastering
- Art Pohlemus – mixing
- Dean Hurley – mixing, sequencing
- John Neff – mixing
