= George Hewitt =

George Hewitt or Hewett may refer to:

- George Hewitt (footballer) (1878–?), English footballer for Burslem Port Vale and Luton Town
- Brian George Hewitt (born 1949), English linguist specialising in Caucasian languages
- George Wattson Hewitt (1841–1916), American architect
- George Hewett (British Army officer) (1750–1840), British general and Commander-in-Chief in India and Ireland
  - Hewett baronets several descendants also named George
- George Hewett, 1st Viscount Hewett (1652–1689)
- George Hewett (footballer) (born 1995), Australian rules footballer for Carlton
- George Hayley Hewett, British naval officer in the Royal Indian Navy

== See also ==
- George Hewitt Cushman (1814–1876), American engraver and miniaturist
- George Hewitt Myers (1875–1957), American forester and philanthropist
