= David Lynch discography =

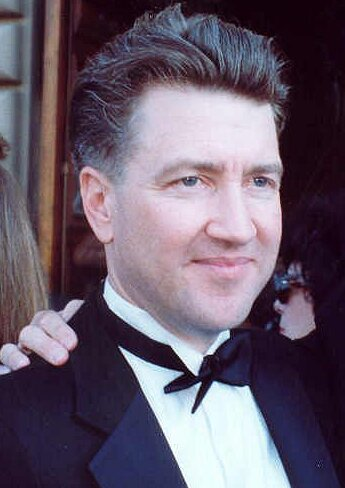
- Lynch in 1990
- Studio albums: 2
- EPs: 1
- Soundtrack albums: 6
- Singles: 20
- Music videos: 6
- Collaborative albums: 5
- Spoken-word albums: 2
- Appearances as a guest musician: 6
- Appearances as a remixer: 6
- Appearances as a producer: 11

The following discography of David Lynch, an American film director and musician, consists of two studio albums, five collaborative studio albums, six soundtrack albums, two spoken-word albums, one extended play, twenty singles and six music videos. Lynch was involved in several music projects, many of them related to his films, including sound design for some of his films (sometimes alongside collaborators Alan Splet, Dean Hurley and Angelo Badalamenti). His album genres included experimental rock, ambient soundscapes and, most recently, avant-garde electropop music. He produced and wrote lyrics for Julee Cruise's first two albums, Floating into the Night (1989) and The Voice of Love (1993), in collaboration with Badalamenti, who composed the music and also produced.

Lynch's first featured release was the soundtrack to his 1977 debut feature film Eraserhead, which was released on I.R.S. Records and Alternative Tentacles in 1982; he recorded the album with sound designer Alan Splet and co-wrote the song "In Heaven (Lady in the Radiator Song)". In the late 1980s and early 1990s Lynch produced several albums with Badalamenti, who scored Lynch's 1990–1991 television series Twin Peaks and the accompanying 1992 feature film Twin Peaks: Fire Walk with Me. Lynch and Badalamenti's own collaborations for Twin Peaks were released over 15 years later as two soundtrack albums: Twin Peaks Music: Season Two Music and More (2007) and The Twin Peaks Archive (2011–2012). Lynch and Badalamenti also released the soundtrack to Lynch's 2001 feature film Mulholland Drive together.

In 1998 Lynch released his first collaborative studio album, Lux Vivens, with Jocelyn Montgomery. It was engineered by John Neff, with whom Lynch released BlueBOB in 2001. Lynch released series of recordings in 2007, including the soundtrack to his 2006 feature film Inland Empire; the soundtrack to his 2007 retrospective exhibition The Air Is on Fire; the collaborative studio album Polish Night Music with Marek Zebrowski; and his debut solo single, "Ghost of Love". Around the time Lynch frequently began collaborating with sound artist and musician Dean Hurley. Lynch subsequently appeared as a guest musician, producer and remixer on several other artists' releases, including Dark Night of the Soul (2010) by Danger Mouse and Sparklehorse and several recordings by Chrystabell.

Crazy Clown Time, Lynch's first solo studio album, was released in November 2011 on PIAS and Sunday Best. Featuring a guest performance by the Yeah Yeah Yeahs vocalist Karen O, it received generally favorable critical acclaim and placed in several international charts. His second studio album, The Big Dream, was released in July 2013 on Sunday Best, Sacred Bones Records and INGRID; The Big Dream's lead single, "I'm Waiting Here", featured guest vocalist Lykke Li. The album received similar favorable reviews and again placed in several international charts. Lynch released his last album, Cellophane Memories, in 2024.

== Career ==
Lynch's musical career bagan with sound design for his early films (sometimes alongside collaborators Alan Splet, Dean Hurley and Angelo Badalamenti). His album genres included experimental rock, ambient soundscapes and, most recently, avant-garde electropop music. He produced and wrote lyrics for Julee Cruise's first two albums, Floating into the Night (1989) and The Voice of Love (1993), in collaboration with Badalamenti, who composed the music and also produced. In 1991, Lynch directed a 30-second teaser trailer for Michael Jackson's album Dangerous at Jackson's request. Lynch also worked on the 1998 Jocelyn Montgomery album Lux Vivens (Living Light), The Music of Hildegard von Bingen. He composed music for Wild at Heart, Twin Peaks: Fire Walk with Me, Mulholland Drive, and Rabbits. In 2001, he released BlueBob, a blues album performed by Lynch and John Neff. The album is notable for Lynch's unusual guitar playing style. He plays "upside down and backwards, like a lap guitar", and relies heavily on effects pedals. Lynch composed several pieces for Inland Empire, including two songs, "Ghost of Love" and "Walkin' on the Sky", in which he made his public debut as a singer. In 2009, his book-CD set Dark Night of the Soul was released. In 2008, he started his own record label, David Lynch MC, which first released Fox Bat Strategy: A Tribute to Dave Jaurequi in early 2009.

In November 2010, Lynch released two electropop music singles, "Good Day Today" and "I Know", on the independent British label Sunday Best Recordings. Of the songs, he said, "I was just sitting and these notes came and then I went down and started working with Dean [Hurley] and then these few notes, 'I want to have a good day, today' came and the song was built around that". The singles were followed by an album, Crazy Clown Time, which was released in November 2011 and described as an "electronic blues album". The songs were sung by Lynch, with guest vocals on one track by Karen O of the Yeah Yeah Yeahs, and composed and performed by Lynch and Hurley. All or most of the songs on Crazy Clown Time were put into art-music videos, with Lynch directing the title song's video.

On September 29, 2011, Lynch released This Train with vocalist and longtime musical collaborator Chrystabell on the La Rose Noire label. Lynch's second studio album, The Big Dream, was released in 2013 and included the single "I'm Waiting Here", with Swedish singer-songwriter Lykke Li. The Big Dream's release was preceded by TBD716, an enigmatic 43-second video featured on Lynch's YouTube and Vine accounts. For Record Store Day 2014, Lynch released The Big Dream Remix EP, which featured four songs from his album remixed by various artists. This included the track "Are You Sure" remixed by the band Bastille. Bastille is known to have been inspired by Lynch's work for its songs and videos, especially the song "Laura Palmer".

On November 2, 2018, a collaborative album by Lynch and Badalamenti, Thought Gang, was released on vinyl and compact disc. The album was recorded around 1993 but not released at the time. Two tracks from it appear on the soundtrack for Twin Peaks: Fire Walk with Me and three others were used for Twin Peaks: The Return. In May 2019, Lynch provided guest vocals on the track "Fire is Coming" by Flying Lotus. He also co-wrote the track that appears on Flying Lotus's album Flamagra. A video accompanying the song was released on April 17, 2019. In May 2021, Lynch produced a track, "I Am the Shaman", by Scottish artist Donovan. The song was released on May 10, Donovan's 75th birthday. Lynch also directed the accompanying video.

In August 2024, Lynch released his final album, Cellophane Memories, a collaboration between him and Chrystabell. Lynch also directed videos for two tracks on the album, "Sublime Eternal Love" and "The Answers to the Questions".

== Albums ==
=== Studio albums ===
List of solo studio albums, with peak chart positions
Title	Details	Peak chart positions							
Title	Details	U.S. Heat	U.S. Indie	BE	CH	DE	FR	JP	UK Indie
Crazy Clown Time	Released: November 7, 2011 (U.S.); Label: PIAS America (50); Sunday Best (46); Format: 2×LP; CD; DD	3	50	68	96	—	96	89	12
The Big Dream	Released: July 16, 2013 (U.S.); Label: Sacred Bones (109); Sunday Best (61); INGRID (020); Format: 2×LP; CD; DD	5	40	75	87	61	91	104	20
"—" denotes a release that did not chart.

=== Collaborative albums ===
List of collaborative studio albums, with other featured artists
Title	Details
Lux Vivens (with Jocelyn Montgomery)	Released: August 25, 1998 (U.S.); Label: Mammoth (183); PolyGram (559 270); Format: CD; DD
BlueBOB (with John Neff)	Released: December 10, 2001 (U.S.); Label: Absurda; Soulitude (1202); Format: CD
Polish Night Music (with Marek Zebrowski)	Released: 2007 (U.S.); Label: David Lynch Music Company (005); Sacred Bones (3018); Sunday Best (72); Format: 2×LP; CD; DD
Thought Gang (with Angelo Badalamenti)	Released: November 2, 2018 (U.S.); Label: Sacred Bones (3018); Format: CD; DD
Cellophane Memories (with Chrystabell)	Released: August 2, 2024 (U.S.); Label: Sacred Bones (3018); Format: CD; DD

=== Soundtrack albums ===
List of soundtrack albums, with other featured artists
Title	Details
Eraserhead: Original Soundtrack (with Alan R. Splet)	Released: 1982 (U.S.); Label: I.R.S. Records (70027); Alternative Tentacles (30); Absurda (109); Sacred Bones (3008); Format: CS; DD; LP
David Lynch's Mulholland Drive: Music from the Motion Picture (with Angelo Badalamenti)	Released: October 9, 2001 (U.S.); Label: Milan (74321); Format: 2×LP; CD; DD
The Air Is on Fire (with Dean Hurley)	Released: March 15, 2007 (U.S.); Label: Strange World Music (001); Sacred Bones (3015); Format: CD; DD; LP
David Lynch's Inland Empire: Soundtrack	Released: September 11, 2007 (U.S.); Label: David Lynch Music Company (002); Format: CD; DD
Twin Peaks Music: Season Two Music and More (with Angelo Badalamenti)	Released: October 23, 2007 (U.S.); Label: David Lynch Music Company (003); Formats: CD; DD
The Twin Peaks Archive (with Angelo Badalamenti)	Released: March 11, 2011 – July 15, 2012 (U.S.) (Note: The Twin Peaks Archive was released track-by-track by the David Lynch Music Company on Lynch's official website over a 16-month period.); Label: David Lynch Music Company; Format: DD

=== Spoken-word albums ===
List of spoken-word albums and audiobooks
Title	Details
Catching the Big Fish: Meditation, Consciousness, and Creativity	Released: December 28, 2006 (U.S.); Label: Penguin (9780143142072); Format: CD; DD
The Marriage of Picture and Sound	Released: April 2012 (Germany); Label: Brigade Commerz; Format: CD

== Extended plays ==
List of extended plays
Title	Details
The Big Dream Remixes EP	Released: December 2, 2013 (UK); Label: Sunday Best (148); INGRID (045); Format: 12-inch; DD

== Singles ==
=== Retail singles ===
List of retail singles, with peak chart positions and other featured artists
Single	Year	Peak chart positions	Album
Single	Year	JP	Album
"Et Ideo" (with Jocelyn Montgomery)	1998	—	Lux Vivens
"Cannes Memory" (with John Neff)	2002	—	Non-album single
"You're More Than That" (with Rona Hartner)	2002	—	Non-album single
"Ghost of Love"	2007	—	David Lynch's Inland Empire: Soundtrack
"Chrome Optimism" (with Dubblestandart and Lee "Scratch" Perry)	2010	—	Marijuana Dreams (Dubblestandart)
"Good Day Today"/"I Know"	2010	110	Crazy Clown Time
"Speed Roadster"	2011	—	Crazy Clown Time
"Girl on the Street" (Instrumental)	2011	—	Non-album single
"The High Night Walk"	2011	—	Non-album single
"Industrial Soundscape No.1"	2011	—	Non-album single
"Kitchen Blues"	2011	—	Non-album single
"Adagio for Large Room"	2011	—	Non-album single
"Victrola Manifestation"	2011	—	Non-album single
"Blurred Dancer Music"	2011	—	Non-album single
"Noah's Ark" (Moby Remix)	2012	—	Crazy Clown Time
"Pinky's Dream" (featuring Karen O)	2012	—	Crazy Clown Time
"I'm Waiting Here" (featuring Lykke Li)	2013	—	The Big Dream
"Are You Sure"/"Star Dream Girl"	2013	—	The Big Dream
"Bad The John Boy"	2013	—	Non-album single
"—" denotes a release that did not chart.

=== Promotional-only singles ===
List of promotional-only singles
Single	Year	Album	Notes
"Stone's Gone Up" (Radio Edit)	2011	Crazy Clown Time	
"Kiss Me (I Loved You)"	2022	Chloë and the Next 20th Century	Credited to Jack Cruz

== Music videos ==
List of music videos, with director(s)
Video	Year	Director(s)	Ref.
"Thank You, Judge" (with John Neff)	2002	David Lynch	
"Good Day Today"	2011	Arnold de Parscau	
"I Know"	2011	Tamar Drachli	
"Crazy Clown Time"	2012	David Lynch	
"I'm Waiting Here" (featuring Lykke Li)	2013	Lykke Li; Daniel Desure	
"Night Ride" (with Chrystabell)	2016	Joseph Skorman	

== Appearances ==
Key
#	Indicates soundtrack to Lynch-directed film or television series

=== As a guest musician ===
List of appearances as a guest musician on other artists' releases
Release	Year	Artist	Ref.
Twin Peaks: Fire Walk with Me (Music from the Motion Picture Soundtrack)	1992	Angelo Badalamenti	
The Voice of Love	1993	Julee Cruise	
Lost Highway	1997	Various artists (produced by Trent Reznor)	
Dark Night of the Soul	2010	Danger Mouse and Sparklehorse	
Marijuana Dreams	2010	Dubblestandart	
This Train	2011	Chrystabell	
Flamagra	2019	Flying Lotus	

=== As a remixer ===
List of appearances as a remixer of other artists' recordings
Song	Year	Original artist	Original album	Ref.
"Girl Panic!" (David Lynch Remix)	2011	Duran Duran	All You Need Is Now	
"Strange Formula" (David Lynch Remix)	2012	Ultraísta	Ultraísta	
"In Your Nature" (David Lynch Remix)	2012	Zola Jesus	Conatus	
"The Poison Tree" (David Lynch Remix)	2012	Moby	Destroyed	
"Evangeline" (David Lynch Remix)	2013	John Foxx and Jori Hulkkonen	European Splendour	
"Fuel to the Fire" (David Lynch Remix)	2014	Agnes Obel	Aventine	
"American Woman" (David Lynch Remix)	2017	Muddy Magnolias	Twin Peaks (Limited Event Series Soundtrack)	
"Je te rends ton amour" (David Lynch Remix)	2024	Mylène Farmer	Innamoramento	

=== As a producer ===
List of appearances as producer or co-producer on other artists' releases
Release	Year	Artist	Ref.
Blue Velvet: Original Motion Picture Soundtrack	1986	Angelo Badalamenti	
Floating into the Night	1989	Julee Cruise	
Wild at Heart: Original Motion Picture Soundtrack	1990	Various artists (produced with Angelo Badalamenti and Mark Roswell)	
Soundtrack from Twin Peaks	1990	Angelo Badalamenti	
Twin Peaks: Fire Walk with Me (Music from the Motion Picture Soundtrack)	1992	Angelo Badalamenti	
The Voice of Love	1993	Julee Cruise	
The Straight Story: Music from the Motion Picture Soundtrack	1999	Angelo Badalamenti	
Lion of Panjshir	2009	Ariana Delawari	
A Tribute to Dave Jaureqi	2010	Fox Bat Strategy	
This Train	2011	Chrystabell	
Somewhere in the Nowhere	2016	Chrystabell	
I Am the Shaman	2021	Donovan	

== See also ==
- Music of Twin Peaks
- David Lynch filmography
