= David Lynch bibliography =

List of books and essays by and/or about David Lynch

The following is a list of books and essays by and/or about David Lynch.

== Books by Lynch ==
- Welcome to Twin Peaks: An Access Guide to the Town (1991) (co-author with Mark Frost, Richard Saul Wurman, Gregg Almquist, Tricia Brock, Harley Peyton, Lisa Friedman, Robert Engels)
- Fire Walk With Me: Screenplay (1991) (co-author with Robert Engels)
- Images (1994)
- Lost Highway screenplay (co-author with Barry Gifford)
- Distorted Nudes (2004)
- Catching the Big Fish (2006)
- The Air Is on Fire (2007)
- Snowmen (2007)
- Dark Night of the Soul (2010)
- Christian Louboutin by Christian Louboutin (2011)
- David Lynch: Works on Paper (2011)
- Genealogies of Pain (2011)
- David Lynch: Chaos Theory Of Violence And Silence (official catalog of the exhibition of the same name that was held at the Laforet Museum Harajuku, Japan from November 10 to December 2, 2012)
- David Lynch: Circle of Dreams (official catalog of the exhibition of the same name that was held at the Centre de la Gravure, Belgium from February 23 to May 19, 2013)
- The Factory Photographs (2014)
- Naming (2014)
- Nudes (2017)
- Room to Dream (2018)
- David Lynch: Someone Is in My House (2021)

=== Contributions to other works ===
- Foreword to Tony Nader's Consciousness Is All There Is: How Understanding and Experiencing Consciousness Will Transform Your Life (2024)

== Books about Lynch ==
- Kaleta, Kenneth C. (1993). David Lynch. Twayne Publishers. ISBN 978-0-8057-9317-8.
- Chion, Michel (1995). David Lynch.
- Wallace, David Foster (1996). David Lynch Keeps His Head (essay). Premiere magazine.;
- Nochimson, Martha P. (1997). The Passion of David Lynch: Wild at Heart in Hollywood. University of Texas Press. ISBN 978-0292755659.
- Rodley, Chris (1997). Lynch on Lynch. Faber and Faber.
- Hughes, David (2001). The Complete Lynch. Virgin Pub.
- Sheen, Erica; Davison, Annette (2004). The Cinema of David Lynch: American Dreams, Nightmare Visions. Wallflower Press. ISBN 978-1-903364-85-7.
- Žižek, Slavoj (2005). The Art of the Ridiculous Sublime: On David Lynch's Lost Highway. Walter Chapin Simpson Center for the Humanities. ISBN 9780295979250.
- Odell, Colin; Le Blanc, Michelle (2007). David Lynch. Kamera Books. ISBN 978-1842432259.
- Olson, Greg (29 September 2008). David Lynch: Beautiful Dark. Scarecrow Press. ISBN 978-0-8108-6371-2.
- Barney, Richard A. (2009). David Lynch: Interviews. Univ. Press of Mississippi. ISBN 978-1-60473-236-8.
- Mactaggart, Allister (2010). The Film Paintings of David Lynch: Challenging Film Theory. Intellect Books. ISBN 978-1-84150-332-5.
- Devlin, William J. (2011). The Philosophy of David Lynch (Philosophy Of Popular Culture). University Press of Kentucky. ISBN 978-0813129914.
- Weshaar, Schuy R. (2012). Masters of the Grotesque: The Cinema of Tim Burton, Terry Gilliam, the Coen Brothers and David Lynch. McFarland & Company.
- Nieland, Justus (2012). David Lynch. University of Illinois Press.
- Nochimson, Martha P. (2013). David Lynch Swerves: Uncertainty from Lost Highway to Inland Empire. University of Texas Press. ISBN 978-0274707232.
- Martin, Richard (2014). The Architecture of David Lynch. Bloomsbury Academic. ISBN 978-1472505484.
- Dukes, Brad (2014). Reflections: An Oral History of Twin Peaks. Short/Tall Press. ISBN 978-0615968834.
- Lim, Dennis (2015). David Lynch: The Man from Another Place. New Harvest. ISBN 978-0544343757.
- Bushman, David (2016). Twin Peaks FAQ: All That's Left to Know About a Place Both Wonderful and Strange. Applause. ISBN 978-1495015861.
- Reid, James D.; Craig, Candace (2019). Agency and Imagination in the Films of David Lynch: Philosophical Perspectives (Cine-Aesthetics: New Directions in Film and Philosophy). Lexington Books. ISBN 978-1498555937.
- Ruers, Jamie; Marianski, Stefan (2022). Freud/Lynch: Behind the Curtain. Karnac Books. ISBN 978-1912691951.
- Godwin, Kenneth George (2020). The David Lynch Files, Volume 1: Eraserhead. Bear Manor Media.
- Godwin, Kenneth George (2020). The David Lynch Files, Volume 2: Dune. Bear Manor Media.
- Jerslev, Anne (2021). David Lynch: Blurred Boundaries. Palgrave Macmillan.
- Hartwig, Marcel; Rauscher, Andreas; Niedermuller, Peter (2023). Networked David Lynch: Critical Perspectives On Cinematic Transmediality. Edinburgh University Press.
- Morschett, Raphael (2024). The Oneiric in the Films of David Lynch: A Phenomenological Approach. Bloomsbury Publishing USA. ISBN 979-8-7651-0704-1.
- Olson, Greg (2024). Black Coffee Lightning: David Lynch Returns to Twin Peaks. Independent Publishers Group.
- Wissner, Reba (2024). David Lynch: Sonic Style. Routledge.
- Miley, Mike (2025). David Lynch's American Dreamscape: Music, Literature, Cinema. Bloomsbury Academic. ISBN 979-8765102893.
- Dickerson, William (2025). The Tao of Twin Peaks: The Meaning Behind David Lynch's Hit TV Series. Kettle of Letters Press. ISBN 978-0985188696.
- Higgs, John (2025). Lynchian: The Spell of David Lynch. Weidenfeld & Nicolson.
- Huddleston, Tom (2025). David Lynch: His Work, His World. Frances Lincoln. ISBN 1836005962.
- Meslow, Scott (2026). A Place Both Wonderful and Strange: The Extraordinary Untold History of Twin Peaks. Running Press Adult.

=== Books directly inspired by Lynch ===
- Pierce, Cameron (2013). In Heaven, Everything Is Fine: Fiction Inspired By David Lynch. Eraserhead Press.
