= David Lynch's unrealized projects =

During his career, American film director David Lynch (1946–2025) had worked on a number of projects that never progressed beyond the pre-production stage under his direction. Some of them fell into development hell and others were officially canceled.

== 1970s ==
=== Gardenback ===
Before starting work on Eraserhead, Lynch worked on a script titled Gardenback, based on his own painting of a hunched figure with vegetation growing from its back. Gardenback was a surrealist script about adultery, featuring a continually growing insect that represented one man's lust for his neighbor. He presented the script to the AFI, but they rejected it, as they felt the planned 45-minute runtime was too long for such a figurative, nonlinear script.

=== I'll Test My Log with Every Branch of Knowledge ===
While working with Catherine E. Coulson on the prolonged production of Eraserhead, Lynch had an idea for a half-hour television show with the actress to be called I'll Test My Log with Every Branch of Knowledge. The series would have been about a middle-aged woman who took a log to various dentists, doctors, and physicians, each of whom talked about it, with the audience learning about its origins. Lynch later realized the character of the "Log Lady" in Twin Peaks, played by Coulson.

=== Ronnie Rocket ===
After Eraserhead's success, Lynch focused on the screenplay of his second film, Ronnie Rocket, which he also wanted to direct. The film's plot would have told the story of a detective seeking to enter a mysterious second dimension, aided by his ability to stand on one leg. He is obstructed on this quest by a strange landscape of odd rooms and a threatening train while being stalked by the "Donut Men", who wield electricity as a weapon. In addition to the detective's story, the film was to show the tale of Ronald d'Arte, a teenage dwarf, who suffers a surgical mishap that leaves him dependent on being plugged into an electrical supply at regular intervals; this dependence grants him an affinity with electricity, which he can use to produce music or cause destruction. The boy names himself Ronnie Rocket and becomes a rock star, befriending a tap-dancer named Electra-Cute. Michael J. Anderson and Dexter Fletcher were attached to the lead role at different times. The project never materialized due to financial conflicts, so Lynch left the production and directed The Elephant Man instead. Anderson later worked with Lynch in Twin Peaks.

== 1980s ==
=== The Metamorphosis ===
At some point in the 1980s, Lynch adapted Franz Kafka's novella The Metamorphosis into a feature film screenplay. The project never came to fruition due to concerns about the cost of realizing Lynch's vision of the insect the story's protagonist transforms into and also Lynch's eventual reluctance to adapt the novella, saying it was "better left as a book".

=== Frances ===
Pleased after his work on The Elephant Man, Mel Brooks sought Lynch as the director of a film project on the life of troubled actress Frances Farmer for his company Brooksfilms. Though he was supposedly interested in the project, Lynch could not stay with it as he had recently signed an agreement with Universal. Graeme Clifford instead took on the position; the resulting film, entitled Frances, released in 1982. When later asked why he didn't attach himself, Lynch answered "I don't remember why I didn't do Frances".

=== Love in Vain ===
After The Elephant Man, Lynch read a screenplay by Alan Greenberg based on the life of blues musician Robert Johnson, and he had mentioned wanting to direct a film of the screenplay in the decades since. As of 2012, Lynch was trying to produce and direct the film with French financing. In 2013, Lynch said:

I'm a 30-year fan of the screenplay Alan Greenberg wrote for Love in Vain. I would very much like to direct it someday. But a number of things would have to fall in place before that would occur.

In 2018, according to Vulture, Lynch was still attempting to raise funds to realize the film.

=== Dune II ===
Lynch had planned to follow his adaptation of Dune with a sequel based on Dune Messiah. According to Lynch, he was more than halfway done with the script when he heard that it was not going to get the green light:

I was really getting into Dune II. I wrote about half the script, maybe more, and I was really getting excited about it. It was much tighter, a better story.

A partial script of Dune II developed by Lynch with notes by Frank Herbert was discovered in summer 2023 at Herbert's archives at California State University, Fullerton. Based on the novel, the film had some differences from the novel's story, much like the first film had. After the critical and commercial failure of Dune, the sequel did not proceed.

=== Red Dragon ===
Lynch briefly developed a film version of Thomas Harris's Red Dragon for Dino De Laurentiis, but decided to drop the project, citing distaste for working on another major studio film, which he said has "no redeeming qualities". The film was eventually made and titled Manhunter, released in 1986.

=== The Trial ===
In a 1986 interview, Lynch told David Chute that if German author Franz Kafka had written a script for a crime picture, he would direct it without hesitation; before adding that he'd like to someday adapt Kafka's The Trial for the bigscreen.

=== Venus Descending ===
In 1987, after the success of Blue Velvet, a Warner Bros. executive hired Lynch to direct a film based on the life of Marilyn Monroe, based on Anthony Summers's best-selling book Goddess: The Secret Lives of Marilyn Monroe. Lynch met with Summers and co-wrote the script with Mark Frost, the first of their many collaborations. The film would have revolved around the last few months of Monroe's life before her supposed assassination by Bobby Kennedy. The studio bailed out of the project for political reasons.

=== One Saliva Bubble ===
On May 20, 1987, Lynch and Frost finished a script for a film project called One Saliva Bubble. Its plot centered around the small town of Newtonville, Kansas, where a secret government project goes amok when a guard's tiny saliva bubble shoots out of his mouth and into a weapons system. This sets off a chain reaction that discombobulates the entire town when the residents begin to switch identities with one another, causing "all kind of wacko hell [to break] loose", as Lynch said. "Clichés one end to the other." It was scheduled to star Steve Martin and Martin Short in lead roles. Characters included a Swiss scientist, an assassin, a car salesman, a black jazz musician, a white floozy, Chinese acrobats, Heinz 57 convention attendees, and the "world's stupidest man." In the chapter "Marty Throws a Party Just to Sing" of his 2014 autobiography, I Must Say: My Life as a Humble Comedy Legend, Short wrote,

We bought the house on the basis of the income I was about to make from two pending movies. You can guess what happened next. Practically the second we signed the mortgage, one of the two movies, a David Lynch film with Steve Martin entitled One Saliva Bubble fell through.

Lynch said he had intended to direct the film through Dino De Laurentiis, who was facing bankruptcy at the time:

We had all our scouts, had it cast, was right there ready to go. Dino kept delaying it, delaying it, delaying it. It became obvious it wasn't going to happen: there wasn't any money. Shortly thereafter his company went bankrupt. We saw the writing on the wall.

De Laurentiis's rights to the project inhibited Lynch from setting it up at another studio. In mid-1992, the project was briefly revived and said to be Lynch's next project after Twin Peaks: Fire Walk with Me.

=== Up At the Lake ===
Up At the Lake was one of the three projects, along with Venus Descending and One Saliva Bubble, that Lynch pitched to De Laurentiis before his business went under. The film was to be a mystery, but no script was written.

=== You Play the Black and the Red Comes Up ===
In the late 1980s, Lynch mooted a film adaptation of Eric Knight's 1938 mystery novel You Play the Black and the Red Comes Up. The story follows a man dealing with luck, death, and irony. Lynch can be seen working on the script for the film in the 1989 documentary Don't Look at Me, but he dropped it before its completion.

=== The Lemurians ===
Before making Twin Peaks, Lynch and Frost pitched a television series they called The Lemurians, based on the story of the lost continent of Lemuria, which sank to the bottom of the Pacific Ocean. It would have featured "a lot of poems" and "detectives tracking extraterrestrials", among other things. NBC turned them down.

== 1990s ==
=== The White Hotel ===
Around 1990, Lynch expressed interest in directing a new screen adaptation of D. M. Thomas's The White Hotel, with a screenplay by Dennis Potter. Before Lynch's involvement, filmmakers Bernardo Bertolucci and Terrence Malick were associated with the project. Lynch intended to cast his then-girlfriend Isabella Rossellini in the main role. After they broke up, plans were scrapped.

=== Untitled Twin Peaks spin-off ===
During the filming of Twin Peaks in the 1990s, Lynch at one point considered releasing a spin-off film of the series film Twin Peaks: Fire Walk with Me centered around the character Audrey Horne. Sherilyn Fenn was attached to reprise her role. The project was not ultimately made, but elements of the story later inspired Lynch's film Mulholland Drive.

=== Twin Peaks: Fire Walk with Me sequels ===
Before the release of Twin Peaks: Fire Walk with Me, Lynch planned to release a sequel to it as a continuation of the series after its cancellation. He also planned a third film. These plans were scrapped after the bad reception of Fire Walk with Me.

=== Domu: A Child's Dream ===
After the successes of Wild at Heart and Twin Peaks, Lynch was approached to direct a live action film adaptation of the Japanese manga Domu: A Child's Dream. The project was set to be financed by Bandai Namco Pictures, based in Japan. Creator Katsuhiro Otomo agreed to relinquish the right to produce the adaptation on the basis of a treatment by Nilo Rodis-Jamero. The project began to collapse when Lynch and Rodis-Jamero brought it to Propaganda Films, which was more interested in striking a deal with Bandai than in making the film.

=== Dream of the Bovine ===
Around 1994, Lynch and Twin Peaks writer Robert Engels co-wrote a script called Dream of the Bovine. Engels said it was about "three guys, who used to be cows, living in Van Nuys and trying to assimilate their lives." Harry Dean Stanton was attached to star and he and Lynch tried to convince Marlon Brando to co-star, but Brando was not interested, calling the script "pretentious bullshit".

=== Fantomas ===
In 1995, the Gaumont approached Lynch to make a film based on the character Fantômas. Lynch recruited Michael Almereyda to rewrite his initial version before choosing to pursue a different project: Lost Highway.

=== Severed ===
The Edward R. Pressman Film Corp. optioned the film rights to Severed: The True Story of the Black Dahlia Murder the year of its publication. Lynch had been fascinated by the case for years. He was sent a copy of the book in 1997 and had briefly been involved to direct a film of the story, but hated the script that Alessandro Camon came up with, which was written by his then-girlfriend.

=== Mulholland Drive TV series iteration ===
In 1998, Lynch initially conceived Mulholland Drive as a 90-minute pilot produced by Touchstone Television, intended to be picked up for a series by ABC. During the filming of the pilot, ABC decided to not pick up the series. Lynch then reworked the pilot as a feature film, which was released in 2001.

=== Woodcutters from Fiery Ships video game ===
In 1998, Synergy Interactive, a Japanese video game production company, announced that it was developing a computer game called Woodcutters from Fiery Ships, designed primarily by Lynch. Lynch was impressed with its earlier game Gadget: Invention, Travel, & Adventure, which he said "delivered an immersive experience to the user". He described the plot of Woodcutters as follows:

Certain events have happened in a bungalow which is behind another in Los Angeles. And then suddenly the woodcutters arrive and they take the man who we think has witnessed these events, and their ship is... uh, silver, like a '30s kind of ship, and the fuel is logs. And they smoke pipes.

The game was canceled in November 1999 due to concerns that its "conundrum"–like story would be uninteresting to computer game players.

== 2000s ==
=== Snootworld ===
As early as 2003, Lynch began working with writer Caroline Thompson on a script for a CG-animated fairy tale project titled Snootworld. It was inspired from a drawing that he had done. His ex-wife Peggy Reavey had once claimed it would be "David's Harry Potter." In 2009, Lynch confirmed that the project was "not happening yet." In 2024, it was reported that he was seeking financial backing for the film after Netflix had rejected his pitch. "Old-fashioned fairy tales are considered groaners", Lynch said. "Apparently people don't want to see them. It's a different world now and it's easier to say no than to say yes." He remained undecided as to whether he would direct (as well as produce and co-write) Snootworld, but was enthusiastic about his daughter Jennifer taking it on instead.

=== Maharishi ===
In a 2009 interview with Vulture, Lynch announced plans to make a film on Maharishi Mahesh Yogi, the founder of Transcendental Meditation. Lynch elaborated:

It'll have to go in the documentary department, I think. I don't think it'll be a talking heads kind of thing, but we're going to do a lot of interviews with people. We'll interview — I hope — in India, a 97-year-old man who was with Maharishi from the beginning and get stories of times that weren't so well recorded.

Titled Maharishi, work on project began by the end of that year in India. Lynch's 10-day journey tracing Maharishi's footsteps is documented in both the films It's a Beautiful World, directed by Richard Beymer, and Shadows of Paradise, directed by Sebastian Lange. In 2014, Lynch updated that he was still in the process of working on the film before stressing that "it's a big, big, big project and it'll take a while."

== 2010s ==
=== Antelope Don't Run No More ===
In 2010, Lynch wrote his first film since Inland Empire, titled Antelope Don't Run No More. The story is said to be set in Los Angeles and features "space aliens, talking animals, and a beleaguered musician named Pinky." Lynch was unable to secure financing for the project. There was some speculation that Lynch would be making the film with Netflix. In 2024, Lynch announced that he could no longer direct projects in person due to emphysema and the risk of contracting COVID-19, but expressed hope that his screenplay for Antelope Don't Run No More would be picked up.

=== "Blood on the Leaves" music video ===
According to Lynch, he was in discussions with musician Kanye West to direct a music video of his song "Blood on the Leaves" from the 2013 album Yeezus. Lynch claimed that the collaboration didn't work out because he "didn't come up with any ideas that I thought [West] would like."

=== Untitled Edward Hopper-inspired film ===
During a 2015 conversation, Lynch expressed his desire to direct a feature film inspired by the works of Edward Hopper. "I love his paintings. They're very lonely, and they all have this sense of mystery; what is really going on? [...] I would like to make a film [set] in an Edward Hopper world, but that hasn't happened," he said.

=== Twin Peaks season 4 ===
After the airing of Twin Peaks: The Return in 2017, Lynch stated that it was too early to say regarding a potential follow-up season but added that if made, it would not be for at least four-and-a-half years. In June 2018, Lynch said one more story was "calling to him" involving the character of Carrie Page. In August that year, when asked about the idea of a fourth season, Lynch claimed to have "a box of ideas" and that he was "working with producer Sabrina S. Sutherland, kind of trying to go through and see if there's any gold in those boxes." Sutherland, for her part, confirmed in 2024 that Lynch indeed had more ideas for Twin Peaks, but was unsure if Mark Frost would be on board.

== 2020s ==
=== Unrecorded Night ===
As early as February 2020, rumors began circulating that Lynch was in the process of casting an upcoming limited series based at Netflix. In March, a casting note resurfaced that said the new project's lead would be an "actress with dark hair in their mid to late 20s" and that the role would require "tasteful nudity". In September, Lynch said in an interview that the COVID-19 pandemic had put plans for a new project on hold. In November, via an issue of Production Weekly, it was announced that Lynch was working on a new project for Netflix under the working titles Wisteria and Unrecorded Night. He was set to write and direct 13 episodes with an $85 million budget, with Sabrina S. Sutherland listed as a producer. Also listed was a director of photography, Peter Deming. Production was set to begin in May 2021 at the Calvert Studios in Los Angeles. Subsequently, frequent Lynch collaborators Kyle MacLachlan and Laura Dern dropped hints that a new project was in the works. On March 31, 2021, MacLachlan posted a cryptic photo of some flowers on Instagram, which he tagged #wisteria. Two months later, Dern said in an interview that "fans should expect more and more radical, boundaryless art from David Lynch". By September, an unknown insider claimed that the project had been either abandoned or postponed, with no reason given. In November, Deming said he was attached to the project but that it had been shut down due to the lockdowns before he could start work on it. In April 2022, another rumor circulated that Lynch would premiere a new film at Cannes, possibly featuring Dern and Naomi Watts, but Lynch quickly denied this. In 2024, Sutherland confirmed that Netflix had effectively scrapped the series:

Unrecorded Night was a non-Twin Peaks series that was going to shoot at Netflix but was canceled when the pandemic hit. There's always a chance we can pick it up again [...] we were in Pre-production and close to shooting.

She also said that Wisteria was a code name given by Netflix for "purposes of secrecy only", and that the show was really titled Unrecorded Night. At the time of Lynch's death, Netflix CEO Ted Sarandos claimed that COVID and Lynch's "health uncertainties" delayed the project, but "we made it clear that as soon as he was able, we were all in." Naomi Watts later confirmed that she and Laura Dern were ready to collaborate with Lynch again after meeting up with him in late November 2024:

We had a beautiful lunch at his house. I knew he'd been unwell but he was in great spirits. He wanted to go back to work — Laura and I were like, 'You can do it! You could work from the trailer.' He was not, in any way, done. I could see the creative spirit alive in him. [...] There's a lot I could share but I want to be private about it because of his family. But it was a really powerful meeting that filled me with just so much love and hope.

In May 2025, four months after the director's death, when asked in an interview about what would come of Unrecorded Night, Sutherland said:

Nobody else could direct it, but I think even in its written form, Unrecorded Night is really wonderful. It's an incredible story, and I really think that it's the best thing he's done. He and I worked on it for several years. We went through all of his old writing and organized all of the things he has. There is so much writing and scripts of David's that was never published. For Unrecorded Night, he took things that had already been written and kind of combined them, while also writing new stuff. We started preproduction and got shut down, but then during COVID, we continued working on the script even after he started his YouTube channel. David wanted to change a whole bunch of the script, so we turned it from what it was during pre-production to what we ended up with before he passed away.

In June, Deming had also expounded on his involvement:

I'd read it, and we actually went on one scout, looking at locations. [...] It's definitely its own original thing, and how it was formatted, I don't really know. [...] In fact, Twin Peaks: The Return, we weren't really sure how many episodes there were going to be until it got into post-production, because it wasn't really written that way; it was written as a 550-page film. So how that was sliced and diced really was a post-production question. Unrecorded Night was the same way. It took me three sittings to read it because it was so thick, but it was definitely not Twin Peaks.

Though secretive about exact details, Deming went on to state that the series was "another L. A. canon" for Lynch—an original mystery blending filmmaking and Old Hollywood. He cited Lost Highway, Mulholland Drive and Inland Empire as the thematic predecessors for Unrecorded Night, calling it "number four in that line of products." A few days later, Jennifer Lynch mentioned that they were considering the scripts be made available as a published piece. Speaking to A Rabbit's Foot, Sutherland stated that the series was going to be re-pitched to Netflix following changes, and was in her opinion "the best thing [Lynch] ever did." She revealed in a later interview that Toby Jones was to play the leading role. In a 2026, Reddit AMA, Jennifer specified that talks were underway amongst her siblings to publish the material.

== Offers ==
Lynch was offered directing the films Fast Times at Ridgemont High, Tender Mercies, and Return of the Jedi.

In Room to Dream, Kristine McKenna claims that, through the 1990s, Lynch turned down directing American Beauty, The Ring, and Motherless Brooklyn, but Lynch had no memory of receiving any of these offers.

== As producer ==
=== Edward Ford ===
Lynch was to produce an attempted production of the notoriously unrealized script titled Edward Ford that was to be directed by the script's writer Lem Dobbs in 1991.

=== It Is Mine ===
In the 1990s, Lynch had agreed to executive produce what was to be the directorial debut of actor Crispin Glover, It Is Mine. When Glover instead made What Is It? as his first feature as a director and screened a rough cut for Lynch, he believed Lynch was only interested in executive producing It Is Mine, not What Is It?. When reading Lynch's 2018 memoir Room to Dream, Glover realised the two had had a miscommunication and that Lynch was under the impression he had executive produced What Is It?, which Glover had not been aware of, thus not crediting Lynch as an executive producer on the film.

=== Cabin Fever ===
When the film was first announced, Lynch was signed on to executive produce the directorial debut of his former assistant Eli Roth, Cabin Fever. Lynch was not credited in the finished film, with Roth claiming Lynch took his name off the film after seeing the final cut, wanting Roth to get full credit for his own film.

=== King Shot ===
In 2009, Lynch was announced as a producer of an Alejandro Jodorowsky project titled King Shot that was to star Nick Nolte and Marilyn Manson.

=== A Fall from Grace ===
In 2013, Lynch was cast in his daughter Jennifer's feature Fall From Grace, which he would produce. Lynch was set to play the father of the lead character, a homicide detective portrayed by Tim Roth, with Paz Vega, Willow Shields, and Vincent D'Onofrio rounding out the cast.

=== Hyena ===
At the time of his death, Lynch was attached to executive produce Hyena, a psychological thriller directed by Scott Coffey, an actor who had appeared in minor roles in many Lynch productions and as one of the leads in Rabbits (2002). The project was shopped at the TIFF Market that year with Lynch posthumously still credited as an executive producer.

== See also ==
- David Lynch filmography

== Bibliography ==
- McKenna, Kristine; Lynch, David (2018). Room to Dream. Canongate Books. ISBN 9781782118404.
- Olson, Greg (2008). Beautiful Dark (illustrated ed.). Scarecrow Press. ISBN 9780810859173.
- Rodley, Chris; Lynch, David (2005). Lynch on Lynch (2nd ed.). Macmillan. ISBN 0571220185.
