= Crazy Clown Time =

Studio album by David Lynch
- Released: November 7, 2011
- Studios: Asymmetrical Studio (Hollywood, California, United States)
- Genres: Blues; electropop; avant-garde
- Length: 68:50
- Labels: PIAS; Sunday Best
- Producer: David Lynch

David Lynch chronology
BlueBOB (2001)	Crazy Clown Time (2011)	The Big Dream (2013)

Singles from Crazy Clown Time
- 1. "Good Day Today"/"I Know" Released: November 28, 2010; 2. "Speed Roadster" Released: 2011; 3. "Noah's Ark" Released: April 21, 2012; 4. "Pinky's Dream" Released: August 6, 2012

Crazy Clown Time is the second studio album and debut solo album by the American director and musician David Lynch. It was released on November 7, 2011 on PIAS and Sunday Best. Described as a "modern blues" album by Lynch, Crazy Clown Time was self-produced and four singles were released.

Upon its release, Crazy Clown Time received moderately positive reviews and placed in several international charts, including the U.S. Billboard Heatseekers Albums chart where it peaked at number 3.

== Composition ==
Crazy Clown Time has been described by Lynch as "a collection of dark songs" in the style of "modern blues". The album incorporates elements of avant-garde music, including the use of feedback; noise; dissonance; and soundscapes which feature "dense layers of texture". Lynch's particular style of blues and his use of avant-garde techniques were commented on by Consequence of Sound, with writer Adam Rier saying that Lynch had "taken something very familiar to anyone who has listened to music in the Western world and turned it into something chilling, creepy [and] utterly Lynch-ian." Several tracks on Crazy Clown Time, including "Good Day Today", are regarded as electronic pop.

Lynch's "Fifties-style" guitar sound on Crazy Clown Time often features use of tremolo, and other effects are used throughout the album, including considerable use of reverb and delay. Lynch's vocal tracks are heavily processed, through use of vocoders and modulation effects.

Crazy Clown Time's lyrics have been described as "enigmatic" and some are written in a stream-of-consciousness style. "Strange and Unproductive Thinking", which includes themes from "cosmic awareness to tooth decay", features lyrics centered around and referencing Transcendental Meditation, a technique Lynch uses and is an advocate of. Two songs on the album ("Strange and Unproductive Thinking" and "Crazy Clown Time") are delivered in a spoken-word vocal style.

Lynch and engineer Dean Hurley composed all of the album's songs; Lynch wrote all of the song's lyrics. Lynch and Hurley's songwriting process began as jams, around which songs "eventually found a form" and to which Lynch later penned the lyrics.

== Packaging ==
Crazy Clown Time's sleeve artwork and booklet were designed by graphic artists Chris Bigg and Vaughan Oliver of v23 under direction from Lynch; Lynch designed several pieces of additional artwork. The "Super-Deluxe" edition, released in 2012, is packaged in a red-leatherette book "and a rigid black suedelle slipcase for maximum tactile effect". Describing the process of designing the packaging, Oliver said:

"I was aiming for a sexy, kitsch quality with the black suede slipcase and red foil-blocked type. The book that slides out enhances this concept with a red leatherette finish and silver clothed spine whilst adding an 'art book' touch with the 'tipped in' image of the red die set into a debossed square centred on the book cover. The overall effect exudes, sex, sleaze and 'roulette wheel' ambience."

The album's title has been theorized by Noisey creative director Eddy Moretti as being related to the "Suffocating Rubber Clown Suit of Negativity", a concept for personal anger and fear featured in Lynch's 2006 book Catching the Big Fish: Meditation, Consciousness, and Creativity.

== Release ==
Crazy Clown Time was released worldwide on November 7, 2011. It was released on PIAS America in the U.S. and Sunday Best in Europe and made available on CD, double LP and as a digital download. Special editions of the album were released internationally, including a collector's edition CD in Europe with a 16-page booklet; a CD in Japan with the bonus track "I Have a Radio"; and an iTunes release with the bonus track "Sparkle Lounge Blues". A limited-edition "Super-Deluxe" box set, including a double LP and single CD with artwork by David Lynch and a 24-page book of lyrics, was released in January 2012, followed by a digital-only deluxe edition on August 6 that included several remixes of the album's songs by Skream, Moby, Underworld, Sasha, Trentemøller and Visionquest.

Four singles from Crazy Clown Time were released. A double A-side single, "Good Day Today"/"I Know", was released in November 2010 to critical acclaim in the U.S. and the UK. and "Speed Roadster" was made available for Lynch's official website in 2011. "Noah's Ark", a single-track 12-inch single featuring a remix of the song by Moby was released in April 2012; "Pinky's Dream" was released in August and featured two remixes by Trentemøller and Visionquest, as well as a previously unreleased remix of "Stone's Gone Up" by Thyte.

== Reception ==
Professional ratings
Aggregate scores
Source	Rating
Metacritic	62/100
Review scores
Source	Rating
AllMusic	3.5/5 stars
The A.V. Club	B−
Billboard	4/5 stars
Clash	8/10
Consequence of Sound	C+
FILTER	80%
Paste	5.0/10
Pitchfork	6.1/10
PopMatters	4/10 stars
Rolling Stone	2/5 stars

At Metacritic, which assigns a normalized rating out of 100 to reviews from mainstream critics, the album received an average score of 62, based on 32 reviews, indicating "generally favorable reviews". AllMusic reviewer Heather Phares wrote that the album wasn't as "accessible" as Lynch's previous collaborations but is "another example of his ability to put his unmistakable stamp on every art form he attempts"; Phares selected "Pinky's Dream", "Good Day Today" and "Strange and Unproductive Thinking" as the album's highlights and rated it three-and-a-half-out-of-five stars. Writing for the A.V. Club, critic Matt Wild said Crazy Clown Time "asks an awful lot of fans … namely, to accept Lynch as a singer" but praised the "jaw-dropping [opening track]" and concluded that the album "fits in nicely with Lynch's untidy and constantly evolving body of work." A four-out-of-five-star review in Billboard said that "Good Day Today" "hits a direct sweet spot" and likened the album's "3-D sonic wash" to "wide-open desert landscapes" and "the kind of barely hinged" characters in Lynch's films, but criticized the "dense layers of texture and avant ambience" and how the album "[spends] a lot more time with noir, impressionistic pieces."

Clash writer Anna Wilson referred to Crazy Clown Time as "a masterful accomplishment" and "beautifully beguiling" and said its production was "as meticulous as the sound design in [Lynch's] movies", rating it eight out of ten. Rating the album a C+ in Consequence of Sound, critic Adam Kivel commented that "[al]though it won't make you think that he's a musician first and a filmmaker second" that Crazy Clown Time's "expressive, emotive features … create a real response in the listener, from familiarity to icy discomfort." Filter awarded the album an 80%/100% rating, with writer Kurt Orzeck saying that "when [Lynch] decides to sing, you should listen." However, Orzeck also said that the album "comes across as Lynch trying to measure up to [Angelo Badalamenti], but falling short."

Offering a largely negative review in Paste, critic Ryan Reed wrote that "Lynch too often flounders around in moody, broody texture—most of which feels lacking without a visual counterpart" but praised the "quartet of wonderful tracks" that open the album; Reed considered the album "disappointing" and "a giant mess", rating it five out of ten. Pitchfork contributor Mike Powell wrote a similar review, saying that "in light of his filmography, the album feels familiar to the point of redundancy" and PopMatters reviewer Philip Majorins surmised that "Crazy Clown Time is clouded with studio experiments that attempt to hold up weak songs." Though praising the album's atmosphere and opening track in Rolling Stone, critic Nick Catucci awarded Crazy Clown Time a two-out-of-five-star rating and referred to it as "numbing". However, Vice listed Crazy Clown Time as the "Best Album of the Month" and summarized it as "an utter fucking treat."

== Track listing ==
All tracks are written by David Lynch and Dean Hurley.

Crazy Clown Time track listing
No.	Title	Length
1.	"Pinky's Dream" (featuring Karen O)	4:00
2.	"Good Day Today"	4:39
3.	"So Glad"	3:35
4.	"Noah's Ark"	4:54
5.	"Football Game"	4:20
6.	"I Know"	4:03
7.	"Strange and Unproductive Thinking"	7:29
8.	"The Night Bell with Lightning"	4:59
9.	"Stone's Gone Up"	5:21
10.	"Crazy Clown Time"	7:00
11.	"These Are My Friends"	4:58
12.	"Speed Roadster"	3:55
13.	"Movin' On"	4:14
14.	"She Rise Up"	5:16
Total length:		68:50

iTunes bonus track
No.	Title	Length
15.	"Sparkle Lounge Blues"	3:49
Total length:		72:39

Japanese CD bonus track
No.	Title	Length
15.	"I Have a Radio"	5:26
Total length:		74:16

Deluxe edition bonus tracks
No.	Title	Length
15.	"Sparkle Lounge Blues"	3:49
16.	"I Have a Radio"	5:26
17.	"I Know" (Skream's Not So Ravey Remix)	5:04
18.	"Good Day Today" (Underworld Classic Remix)	8:40
19.	"I Know" (Sasha Remix)	8:56
20.	"Noah's Ark" (Moby Remix)	5:56
21.	"Pinky's Dream" (Visionquest Velvet Curtain Instrumental Remix)	8:18
22.	"Pinky's Dream" (Trentemøller Remix)	5:54
23.	"I Have a Radio" (Video)	5:28
24.	"Crazy Clown Time" (Video)	7:00
Total length:		133:21

== Personnel ==
All personnel credits adapted from Crazy Clown Time's album notes.

- David Lynch – vocals (2–7, 9–14), guitar (1, 3, 5–13), synthesizer (6), percussion (7), omnichord (13), production, mixing, art direction, artwork
- Chris Bigg – design
- Dean Hurley – guitar (1, 3, 6–9, 13, 14), bass (6, 8, 9, 11–13), drums (1, 3, 5, 6, 8, 10–13, synthesizer (2, 9, 14), organ (6), programming (2, 4, 9, 14), mixing
- Brian Lucey – mastering
- Karen O – vocals (1)
- Vaughan Oliver – design

== Charts ==
Chart (2011)	Peak position
Belgian Albums (Ultratop Flanders)	68
Belgian Heatseekers Albums (Ultratop Wallonia)	5
French Albums (SNEP)	96
Swiss Albums (Hitparade)	96
UK Albums (OCC)	91
UK Independent Albums (OCC)	12
U.S. Heatseekers Albums (Billboard)	3
U.S. Independent Albums (Billboard)	50
