= Polish Night Music =

Studio album by Marek Zebrowski and David Lynch
- Released: 2007
- Recorded: 2004–2006
- Studios: Asymmetrical Studio (Hollywood, California, United States)
- Genres: Minimalism; ambient; modern classical
- Length: 76:47
- Labels: David Lynch Music Company; Sunday Best; Sacred Bones

David Lynch chronology
Twin Peaks Music: Season Two Music and More (with Angelo Badalamenti) (2007)	Polish Night Music (2007)	The Twin Peaks Archive (with Angelo Badalamenti) (2011–2012)

Alternate cover
- 2015 deluxe-edition LP

Polish Night Music is a collaborative studio album by the Polish–American composer Marek Zebrowski and the American director and musician David Lynch. It was released in 2007 on David Lynch Music Company.

== Background ==
Marek Zebrowski and David Lynch met during the International Film Festival of the Art of Cinematography Camerimage in Łódź, Poland. Lynch originally hired Zebrowski—a Polish–American—as a Polish-language translator during the production of his 2006 feature film Inland Empire, part of which was shot in Łódź. Zebrowski and Lynch discussed the concepts of experimental music and freeform improvisation and their mutual interest in both. Lynch subsequently invited Zebrowski to Asymmetrical Studio—Lynch's home recording studio in Hollywood, California, United States—to collaborate on a series of musical experiments.

== Recording ==
Polish Night Music was recorded at Asymmetrical Studio in Hollywood over a two-year period between 2004 and 2006. John Neff, with whom Lynch released his debut collaborative album BlueBOB in 2001, engineered half of the recording sessions and Dean Hurley engineered the remaining sessions; Hurley conducted additional field recordings in Poland in winter 2006. The album was edited and mixed by Hurley, Lynch and Zebrowski.

The sessions for Polish Night Music were "initiated by Lynch with a narrative fragment, an image cluster intended as a sort of mental focus plane" around which Lynch and Zebrowski would improvise; Lynch performed on a Korg synthesizer and Zebrowski performed on a Yamaha piano.

== Composition ==
Polish Night Music features freeform improvisations composed by Zebrowski and Lynch. Zebrowski's performance has been described as adding a "formal complexity" and central musical structure to Lynch's "tonal fabric". The Guardian described Polish Night Music as an album "that bypasses the sounds of groaning monsters and creaking cellar doors and instead conjures fear in its eerie atmosphere."

Dean Hurley referred to the album's imagery and "suggested narratives" as being about "night", "barren train stations, Polish factories" and "silent hotels where lonely travelers meet". Łódź, the city in Poland in which Lynch and Zebrowski were introduced to each other, was a central influence on the album. Zebrowski recalled that during the album's later recording sessions Lynch asked him to think about "the desolate factories of Łódź sit[ting] silent and empty" and how "only the memories of the machines remain."

== Release ==
Polish Night Music was originally released as a limited-edition CD in 2007 on David Lynch Music Company. It was reissued as a double LP and digital download on November 13, 2015 by Sunday Best in Europe and Sacred Bones Records in the U.S. Sacred Bones also issued a deluxe edition of the double LP as 250 hand-numbered copies in a gatefold sleeve with a full-color 11-inch×11-inch insert. Both Sunday Best and Sacred Bones LP reissues included a download code for a 43-minute bonus live album, Live at the Consulate General of the Republic of Poland, which features four previously unreleased tracks recorded in 2006.

Lynch and Zebrowski performed together around the time of Polish Night Music's release, showcasing an improvised set at the Fondation Cartier pour l'Art Contemporain in Paris, France, in March 2007 as part of an exhibition of Lynch's artwork called "The Air Is On Fire"; a 7-minute video of the performance was released online by Sacred Bones in 2015. The two performed four years later at a concert at the University of Southern California in Los Angeles on March 26, 2011; a 10-minute video of the performance was released online by Sunday Best in 2015.

"Polish Night Music No. 1", a track not featured on Polish Night Music, was included on the soundtrack to Inland Empire, which was released months prior to the album.

== Reception ==
Professional ratings
Review scores
Source	Rating
PopMatters	7/10 stars

Writing for PopMatters in a seven-out-of-ten-star review, critic John Garrett referred to Polish Night Music as a "large piece of bold politeness" and a "meeting of sound and meditation that asks for nothing in return." Garrett also drew comparisons between the album's atmosphere and two of Lynch's feature films—1997's Lost Highway and 2001's Mulholland Drive—and wrote: "to say that [Polish Night Music] is a headphone album is an understatement. You need to turn up the volume after plugging in your headphones. All of the lighter-than-air bits and pieces are waiting for you to let them bounce around inside your head."

== Track listing ==
All music is composed by Marek Zebrowski and David Lynch.

No.	Title	Length
1.	"Night: City Back Street"	13:29
2.	"Night: A Landscape with Factory"	17:41
3.	"Night: Interiors"	26:46
4.	"Night: A Woman on a Dark Street Corner"	18:51
Total length:		76:47

2015 digital-download-only bonus live album, Live at the Consulate General of the Republic of Poland
No.	Title	Length
1.	"Night: Memories of Machines"	14:30
2.	"Night: Unfilled Dreams"	10:56
3.	"Night: The Great Electrical Pants Stand Like Cathedrals"	9:51
4.	"Night: Snowfalls Through the Black Leafless Trees"	8:21
Total length:		43:38

== Personnel ==
All personnel credits adapted from Polish Night Music's album notes.

Performers

- David Lynch – synthesizer
- Marek Zebrowski – piano

Technical personnel

- Dean Hurley – recording (3, 4), editing, mixing
- David Lynch – editing, mixing
- Marek Zebrowski – editing, mixing
- John Neff – recording (1, 2)

Design personnel

- David Lynch – design, artwork
- David Correll – design (2015 LP reissue)
