= Dean Hurley =

American composer, music producer and sound designer

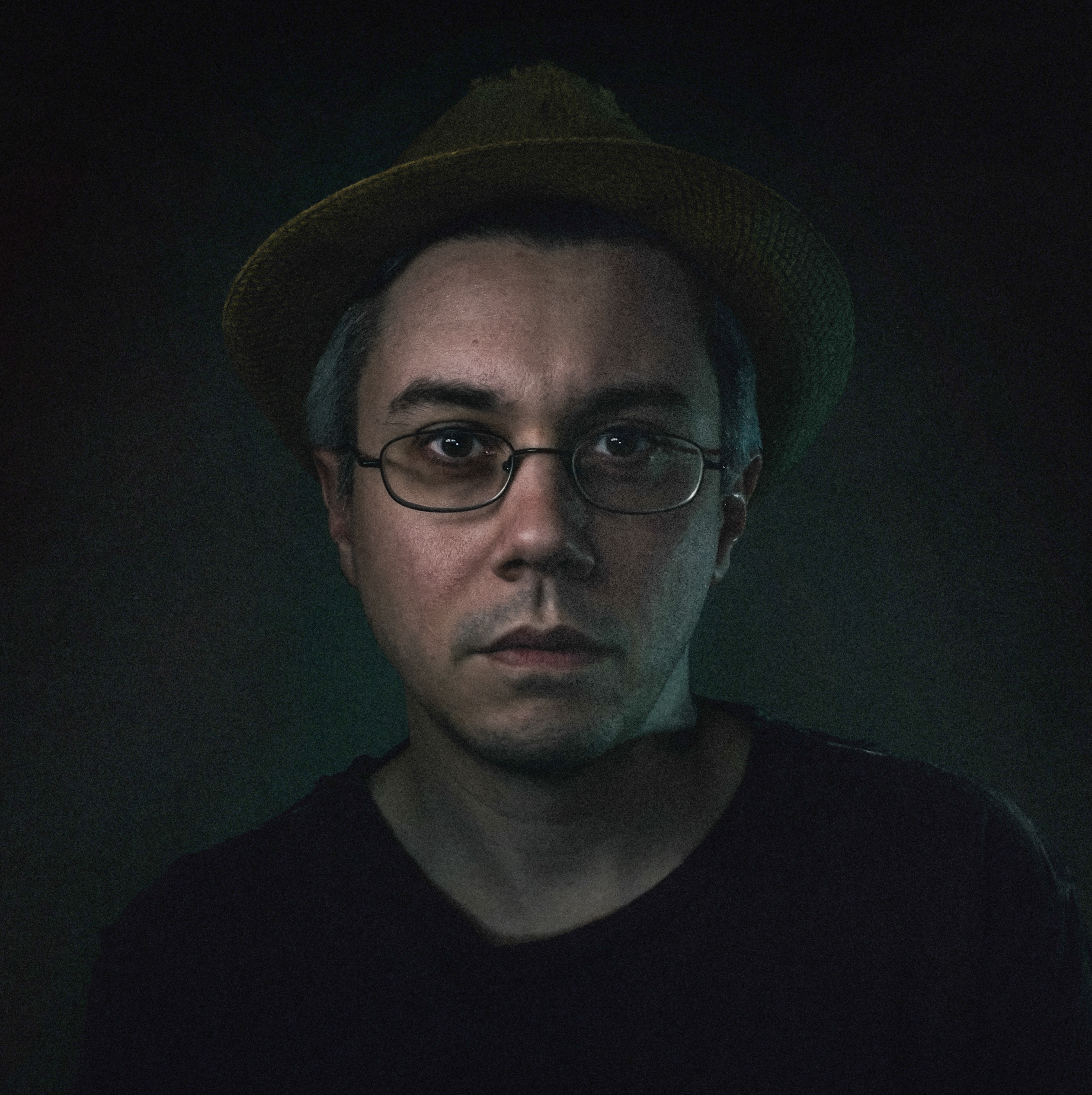
- Hurley in 2019

Background information
- Genres: Ambient; avant-garde; rock; jazz; film score
- Occupations: Composer; record producer; musician; sound designer; re-recording mixer; sound supervisor; sound mixer; supervising sound editor; songwriter
- Years active: 2004–present
- Labels: Sacred Bones Records; Boomkat Editions

Dean Hurley is an American composer, record producer, musician, sound designer, re-recording mixer, and songwriter. He received two Primetime Emmy Award nominations for the third season of Twin Peaks. He is best known for his frequent collaborations with director David Lynch. Hurley has worked on many different types of films as a film score composer, sound supervisor, sound designer, re-recording mixer, sound mixer, and supervising sound editor. Notably he composed the original motion picture score for the 2023 feature film Divinity, along with DJ and record producer DJ Muggs.

He produced for Zola Jesus on her album Taiga (2014), and for the Veils on their album Total Depravity (2016). In 2017, Hurley released the album Anthology Resource Vol. 1: △△, which features original material created for Twin Peaks, and in 2019 he released Anthology Resource Vol. II: Philosophy of Beyond on Sacred Bones Records. He has worked with a variety of musicians aside from Lynch, DJ Muggs, Zola Jesus, and the Veils, such as Donovan, Chrystabell, Flying Lotus, Romance, Gloria de Oliveira, John Carpenter, Chromatics, Sky Ferreira, Dlina Volny, Trouble, Jaye Jayle, Jorja Chalmers, Tiny Ruins, and Sam Gendel, among others.

== Select filmography ==
Year	Title	Contribution	Note
2026	Mike & Nick & Nick & Alice	Sound designer	Feature film
2025	I Live Here Now	Sound designer, supervising sound editor and music supervisor	Feature film
2024	Lula	Supervising sound editor	Documentary
2023	Scott Pilgrim Takes Off	Additional sound design	Anime TV series
2023	The Sweet East	Sound designer and composer	Feature film
2023	The Mystic	New film score and composer	1925 feature film Blue-Ray set home media release by The Criterion Collection
2023	Divinity	Film score and composer, along with DJ Muggs	Feature film
2021	Past Is Prologue	Editor	Documentary
2020	Happily	Sound designer and re-recording mixer	Feature film
2020	Looks That Kill	Film score and composer	Feature film
2019	Flying Lotus featuring David Lynch: Fire Is Coming	Additional sound design and mix	Music video
2018	Stuntman	Sound supervisor and re-recording mixer	Documentary
2018	What Did Jack Do?	Composer and re-recording mixer	Short film
2017	Twin Peaks (season 3)	Sound mixer and supervising sound editor	TV series
2017	The Putin Interviews	Re-recording mixer	TV series
2015	The Music of David Lynch Benefit Concert	Re-recording mixer	TV special
2014	Twin Peaks: The Missing Pieces	Sound supervisor and re-recording mixer	Feature film
2014	Duran Duran: Unstaged	Sound mixer	Video short
2012	Change Begins Within	Re-recording mixer	TV special
2011	Blue Velvet: The Lost Footage	Sound supervisor and re-recording mixer	Feature film
2010	Dior: Lady Blue Shanghai	Film score and composer, along with David Lynch	Short film
2009	My Son, My Son, What Have Ye Done	Sound supervisor and re-recording mixer	Feature film
2008	Fight or Die	Sound supervisor and re-recording mixer	TV series
2006	Making 'the New World'	Sound supervisor and re-recording mixer	Documentary
2006	Inland Empire	Sound supervisor and re-recording mixer	Feature film

== Awards and nominations ==
Year	Result	Award	Category	Work	Ref.
2018	Nominated	Primetime Emmy Awards	Outstanding Sound Editing for a Limited Series, Movie, or Special	Twin Peaks	
2018	Nominated	Primetime Emmy Awards	Outstanding Sound Mixing for a Limited Series or Movie	Twin Peaks	
2018	Nominated	Cinema Audio Society Awards	Outstanding Achievement in Sound Mixing for a Television Movie or Mini-Series	Twin Peaks	
2018	Nominated	Motion picture Sound Editors	Golden Reel Award for Outstanding Achievement in Sound Editing - Music Score and Musical for Episodic Short Form Broadcast Media	Twin Peaks	

== Discography ==
Solo albums

- Days of Thunder and Rain, self-released (2014)
- Anthology Resource Vol. 1, Sacred Bones Records (2017)
- Anthology Resource Vol. II, Sacred Bones Records (2019)
- Concrete Feather, Boomkat Editions (2020)

Solo singles

- "Our Day Will Come", Sacred Bones Records (2022)

Collaborative albums

- Inland Empire (Original Soundtrack) (by David Lynch), DLMC (2007)
- The Air is on Fire (by David Lynch), DLMC (2007)
- Crazy Clown Time (by David Lynch), Sunday Best (2010)
- This Train (by David Lynch and Chrystabell), La Rose Noire (2011)
- The Big Dream (by David Lynch), Sunday Best (2013)
- Somewhere in the Nowhere (by David Lynch and Chrystabell), Meta Hari (2016)
- In Every Dream Home a Heartache (with Romance), Ecstatic (2022)
- Oceans of Time (with Gloria de Oliveira), Sacred Bones Records (2022)
- River of Dreams (with Romance), Ecstatic (2023)
- Divinity (Original Motion Picture Score) (with DJ Muggs), Sacred Bones Records (2023)
- Cellophane Memories (by Chrystabell and David Lynch), Sacred Bones Records (2024)

Appearances and remixes

- Ghost of Love by David Lynch, David Lynch Music Company (2007)
- "Dark Night of the Soul" by Danger Mouse, Sparklehorse and David Lynch from Dark Night of the Soul, Capitol Records (2010)
- "Bad the John Boy" by David Lynch, Sacred Bones Records (2013)
- "I'm Waiting Here" by David Lynch and Lykke Li, Sacred Bones Records (2013)
- "Night (Zola Jesus and Dean Hurley remix)" from Lost Themes by John Carpenter, Sacred Bones Records (2015)
- "Dream Wave" by Tiny Ruins, Bella Union (2016)
- "Snake Eyes" by Trouble from Twin Peaks: Music from the Limited Event Series, Rhino Records (2017)
- "Slow 30s Room" (with David Lynch) from Twin Peaks: Limited Event Series Original Soundtrack, Rhino Records (2017)
- "Blue Girl (Dean Hurley remix)" from Camera by Chromatics, Italians Do It Better (2018)
- The Flame of Love by David Lynch and Jack Cruz, Sacred Bones Records (2020)
- "Saturday (Dean Hurley remix)" from Shadow (Remixes) by Chromatics, Italians Do It Better (2021)

== Production discography ==
- The Big Dream – David Lynch (2013)
- Taiga – Zola Jesus (2014)
- Total Depravity – The Veils (2016)
- Dies Occidendum – DJ Muggs (2021) (Mastering)
- "I Am the Shaman" – Donovan (2021)
