= Anthology Resource Vol. 1 =

Anthology Resource Vol. 1: △△

Soundtrack album by Dean Hurley
- Released: August 6, 2017
- Recorded: 2012–2017
- Genre: Ambient
- Length: 39:43
- Label: Sacred Bones
- Producer: Dean Hurley

Professional ratings
Review scores
Source	Rating
Pitchfork	6.5/10

Anthology Resource Vol. 1: △△ is a soundtrack album for the third season of the television series Twin Peaks by supervising sound editor and mixer Dean Hurley. It features incidental tracks produced by Hurley under direction of frequent collaborator David Lynch as series sound designer. These tracks consist of ambient instrumental underscore and diegetic soundscapes showcased throughout the third season. The album was produced largely with analogue sound sources, designed to lend "sonic impact and emotional color to Lynch's vision."

== Track listing ==
All music is composed by Dean Hurley.

No.	Title	Length
1.	"Intro Cymbal Wind"	1:00
2.	"Night Electricity Theme"	2:52
3.	"Electricity I"	0:57
4.	"Weighted Room / Choral Swarm"	5:31
5.	"Tube Wind Dream"	1:24
6.	"Tone / Slow Speed Prison / Low Mood"	4:28
7.	"Slow One Chord Blues (Interior)"	1:10
8.	"Interior Home by the Sea"	1:26
9.	"Low Sustained Mystery"	1:58
10.	"Angel Choir Reveal"	0:30
11.	"Seven Heaven"	0:59
12.	"Eastern European Symphonic Mood No. 1"	4:23
13.	"Black Box"	0:38
14.	"Girl Appears / Black Smoke"	2:37
15.	"Shanghai Mysterioso"	4:42
16.	"Forest / Interior"	2:44
17.	"Electricity II"	1:03
18.	"Future / Past"	1:23
Total length:		39:43
