= Dies Occidendum =

Studio album by DJ Muggs
- Released: March 12, 2021
- Genre: Illbient
- Length: 30:20
- Label: Sacred Bones
- Producer: DJ Muggs

DJ Muggs chronology
| Death & the Magician (2021) | Dies Occidendum (2021) | Rammellzee (2021) |

Professional ratings
Review scores
| Source | Rating |
|---|---|
| AllMusic | 4/5 stars |
| Flood Magazine | 8/10 |
| Spectrum Culture | 62/100% |

Dies Occidendum is the first instrumental hip-hop studio album by American record producer DJ Muggs. It was released on March 12, 2021, via Sacred Bones Records. Produced by Muggs himself, it features contributions from Steve Ferlazzo on keyboards. The album debuted at number 76 on the Top Current Album Sales chart in the United States, and also number 97 on the Offizielle Top 100 and number 16 on the Top 20 HipHop albums charts in Germany. A music video was released for the song "Nigrum Mortem".

In mid-January 2021, the album's title, release date and track listing were revealed, along with the song "The Chosen One" off of the then-upcoming project. The album's released was paired with Dean Hurley's edited eight-minute documentary Past Is Prologue about Muggs' journey to Egypt.

== Track listing ==
| No. | Title | Length |
|---|---|---|
| 1. | "Incantation" | 2:15 |
| 2. | "The Chosen One" | 3:02 |
| 3. | "Nigrum Mortem" | 4:07 |
| 4. | "Liber Null 777" | 3:41 |
| 5. | "Alphabet of Desire" | 2:11 |
| 6. | "Subconscious" | 2:42 |
| 7. | "Veni Vidi Amavi" | 1:47 |
| 8. | "Anointed" | 2:22 |
| 9. | "Anicca" | 2:56 |
| 10. | "Transmogrification" | 5:17 |
| Total length: | | 30:20 |

== Personnel ==
- Lawrence "DJ Muggs" Muggerud – producer, mixing
- Steve Ferlazzo – keyboards
- Sam Kingston – mixing
- Dean Hurley – mastering
- Ayis Lertas – artwork

== Charts ==
| Chart (2021) | Peak position |
|---|---|
| German Albums (Offizielle Top 100) | 97 |
| German Hip-Hop Albums (Top 20 HipHop) | 16 |
| US Top Current Album Sales (Billboard) | 76 |
