= 8½ Souvenirs =

- Genres: Swing revival
- Years active: 1993–present

8½ Souvenirs is an American swing revival band that is currently active, since 1993.

The band was signed to RCA Victor and had two albums on that label, as well as two under indie labels in Austin, Texas. 8½ Souvenirs is named after the film 8½, directed by Federico Fellini, and the song "Souvenirs" by gypsy jazz guitarist Django Reinhardt

The band appeared on Austin City Limits in April 1998.

== Personnel ==
The band lineup evolved over the years. During different periods, the personnel included:

- Olivier Giraud (guitar, vocals) The founder and key member of the Souvenirs. Now a member of the band Continental Graffiti.
- Tony Balbineau (vocals, rhythm guitar)
- Todd Wulfmeyer (bass)
- Kathy Kiser (vocals)
- Glover Gill (piano)
- Adam Berlin (drums)
- Juliana Sheffield (vocals)
- Kevin Smith (bass)
- Justin Sherburn (piano)
- Rob Kidd (drums)
- Chrysta Bell (vocals)

== Discography ==
- Happy Feet (RCA Victor, 1995)
- Happy Feet (The Second Edition), Continental Records, 1997
- Souvonica, Continental Records, 1997
- Twisted Desire (RCA Victor, 1999)
- Live Memories (Giraudo, 2000)
- At The Movies, Continental Records, 2022
