= David Lynch: The Art Life =

- Film poster
- Directed by: Rick Barnes; Olivia Neergaard-Holm; Jon Nguyen
- Produced by: Jon Nguyen; Jason S.; Sabrina S. Sutherland
- Starring: David Lynch
- Cinematography: Jason S.
- Edited by: Olivia Neergaard-Holm
- Music by: Jonatan Bengta
- Production company: Duck Diver Films
- Distributed by: Janus Films (United States)
- Release dates: September 4, 2016 (Venice); March 21, 2017 (United States)
- Running time: 88 minutes
- Countries: United States; Denmark
- Language: English
- Box office: $311,152

David Lynch: The Art Life is a 2016 documentary film directed by Rick Barnes, Olivia Neergaard-Holm, and Jon Nguyen about the early life and work of American filmmaker David Lynch.

== Synopsis ==
The film was shot over a four-year period. It features footage of Lynch creating new paintings and other artwork at his home and playing with his infant daughter Lula, along with photographs of his early life and work. The audio, pieced together from over 20 conversations the filmmakers recorded with Lynch, consists of anecdotes from his life beginning with his upbringing in Montana, Idaho, Washington, and Virginia. He then details his disenchanting studies in Boston, his reluctant move to Philadelphia with his wife Peggy (and subsequent birth of daughter Jennifer) to pursue a career as a painter, his divorce and relocation to Los Angeles to become a filmmaker after winning a grant from the American Film Institute, and the start of production on Eraserhead.

== Production ==
The film received financing through a Kickstarter campaign. The filmmakers had previously created Lynch One, a documentary about the making of Inland Empire.

== Release ==
Prior to the film's premiere, Film Constellation purchased its global distribution. It premiered at the Venice Film Festival on September 4, 2016. It received a limited domestic release on March 31, 2017, and was later released on Blu-ray by The Criterion Collection.

== Reception ==
On the review aggregator website Rotten Tomatoes, The Art Life holds a 90% approval rating, based on 81 reviews. The website's critical consensus reads, "David Lynch: The Art Life offers a look at the director's life and craft whose unusual approach is in keeping with its subject's singularly strange aesthetic." On Metacritic, the film received a rating of 75 out of 100, based on 17 reviews, indicating "generally favorable" reviews.
