= Sabrina S. Sutherland =

American film producer

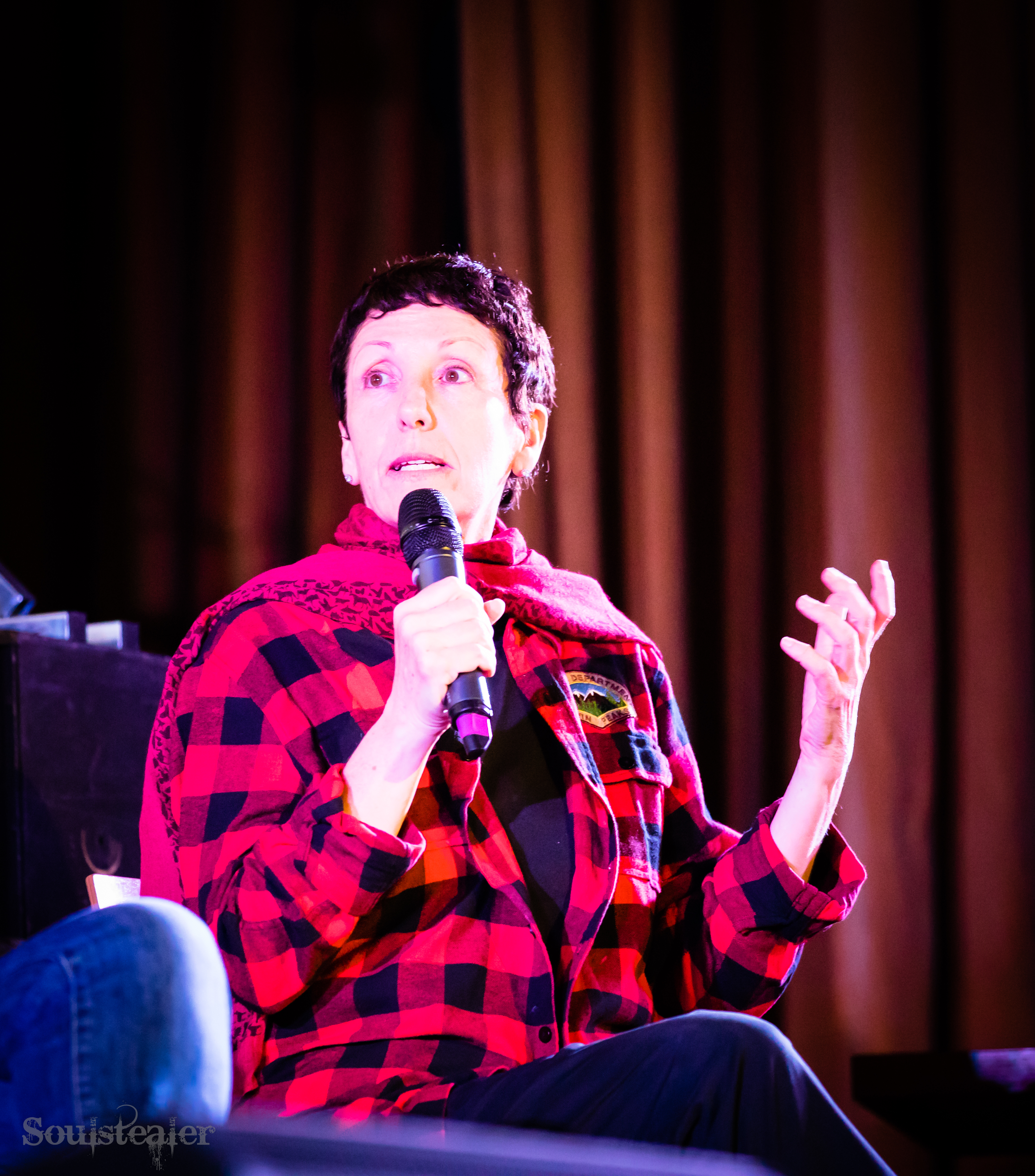
Sutherland at the Twin Peaks UK festival in 2017

Sabrina S. Sutherland is an American film producer, best known for her work with David Lynch.

== Career ==
Sutherland is known for being the long-time producing partner of David Lynch and for her work on Twin Peaks (1990), Inland Empire (2006), and Twin Peaks: The Return (2017). She also worked with him on a planned Netflix show with the working titles Wisteria and Unrecorded Night; the project remained unproduced following Lynch's death.

As an actress, Sutherland had a small role in Twin Peaks: The Return.

In 2020 and 2021, Sutherland has managed and produced the David Lynch Theater channel on YouTube.

== Filmography ==
=== Film ===
Year	Work	Role	Ref.
2006	Inland Empire	Associate producer	
2016	David Lynch: The Art Life	Producer	
2020	What Did Jack Do?	Producer	

=== Television ===
Year	Work	Role	Note	Ref.
1990–91	Twin Peaks	Production coordinator	Season 2	
2017	Twin Peaks: The Return	Executive producer	Cameo role as Floor Attendant Jackie	
