= Divinity (soundtrack) =

Divinity (Original Motion Picture Score)

Film score by DJ Muggs and Dean Hurley
- Released: October 13, 2023
- Recorded: 2023
- Genre: Film score
- Length: 42:42
- Label: Sacred Bones Records
- Producer: DJ Muggs; Dean Hurley
- Compiler: Dean Hurley

DJ Muggs chronology
| Notes and Tones (2023) | Divinity (2023) | Lofi Punk (2023) |

Dean Hurley chronology
| Looks That Kill (2020) | Divinity (2023) |

Divinity (Original Motion Picture Score) is the film score composed by DJ Muggs and Dean Hurley to the 2023 film Divinity directed by Eddie Alcazar. The film score was released through Sacred Bones Records on October 13, 2023.

== Background ==
The film score is written, curated and produced by DJ Muggs in collaboration with Dean Hurley. Hurley came in contact with Alcazar for a potential film scoring opportunity. Alcazar reached out to Muggs and Hurley and discussed about the script, which they liked to do, as it was something out of their comfort zone prompting him to push the sound and the pulse to a different world. Alcazar was a fan of Muggs since his childhood. He showed him footage of few sequences and found it to be a perfect fit for him to explore some of these ideas. The unique sound was considered to be a challenge, as Muggs refrained from rehashing his past discography and wanting to sound different from other works.

Muggs used a software which sounded like real symphonies and orchestras, while for the beats he went with a more traditional approach. In terms of sounds, the software emphasizes on real orchestral music which did not come like playing on a keyboard. While playing for the first time, he "pretty much nailed it, like 80% the first time" though having to concentrate on few details. Muggs prioritized on using synthesizers and 8-bit samplers to curate the film's music.

== Release ==
Divinity (Original Motion Picture Score) was released by Sacred Bones Records digitally on October 13, 2023, followed by a CD and LP release on November 3 and 24, respectively.

== Reception ==
Dennis Harvey of Variety wrote "The original score by DJ Muggs and Dean Hurley soon grows more conventional than this project needs, however." Siddhant Adlakha of IGN wrote "Divinity often emits an uncanny glow, complemented by its pulsating musical score by Cypress Hill alumnus DJ Muggs and Twin Peaks sound designer Dean Hurley." Nick Schager of The Daily Beast called the score "ominously electronic". denoted the music and sound design being "impeccable, adding an even more ominous layer to the proceedings." Liam Maguren of Flicks described it "an electronic-heavy score by Dean Hurley and DJ Muggs". Howard Waldstein of Comic Book Resources wrote "One of the great aspects of Divinity is its sound design by DJ Muggs, which draws immediate corollaries in the distorted percussive allure of early Nine Inch Nails, and William Basinski's degraded, cavernous soundscape masterpiece The Disintegration Loops."

== Track listing ==
| No. | Title | Length |
|---|---|---|
| 1. | "Intro Descent" | 1:41 |
| 2. | "Live Eternal" | 1:44 |
| 3. | "Bigger, Stronger, Faster" | 0:51 |
| 4. | "Capture" | 2:00 |
| 5. | "Main Titles" | 1:14 |
| 6. | "The Brothers" | 3:30 |
| 7. | "Drone Interrogation" | 3:39 |
| 8. | "A Symbol of Life" | 2:02 |
| 9. | "Heavy Weight" | 1:04 |
| 10. | "Reflective Dreams" | 3:40 |
| 11. | "Infinity Techno" | 3:29 |
| 12. | "Escape Suite" | 3:54 |
| 13. | "Aftermath" | 1:08 |
| 14. | "Rip Fights" | 2:08 |
| 15. | "Final Fight" | 4:00 |
| 16. | "Ascend Finale" | 3:01 |
| 17. | "Divinity 2 Infinity: The Odyssey" | 3:37 |
| Total length: | | 42:42 |

== Release history ==
Release history and formats for Divinity (Original Motion Picture Score)
| Region | Date | Format(s) | Label(s) | Ref. |
|---|---|---|---|---|
| Various | October 13, 2023 | Digital download; streaming | Sacred Bones Records | |
| Various | November 3, 2023 | CD | Sacred Bones Records | |
| Various | November 24, 2023 | LP | Sacred Bones Records | |
