= BlueBOB =

Studio album by David Lynch and John Neff
- Released: December 10, 2001
- Recorded: April 1998 – March 2000
- Studio: Asymmetrical Studio (Hollywood, California, United States)
- Genre: Industrial; blues; experimental rock
- Length: 53:12
- Label: Soulitude Records
- Producer: David Lynch; John Neff

David Lynch chronology
David Lynch's Mulholland Drive: Music from the Motion Picture (2001)	BlueBOB (2001)	Catching the Big Fish: Meditation, Consciousness, and Creativity (2006)

BlueBOB (stylized as ƎU⅃ᗺᗷOᗷ) is the debut studio album by the American director and musician David Lynch and audio engineer John Neff. It was released in December 2001 on Absurda—Lynch's own record label—and Soulitude Records. Recorded over a 23-month period from 1998 to 2000 at Lynch's home studio, BlueBOB was originally an experiment by Lynch and Neff that evolved into a full-length album.

Described as an industrial blues album, BlueBOB features music co-written by both Lynch and Neff and lyrics by Lynch; Neff is the album's lead vocalist. Lynch's lyrics, some of which had been written two decades before the album, incorporate themes of paranoia and noir fiction. The album incorporates elements of rock and roll, surf and heavy metal, which has drawn critical comparisons to Tom Waits, Captain Beefheart and Link Wray.

BlueBOB originally received a limited release through Lynch's official website but was later reissued in the United States and Europe. The album received particular interest from the music press in Europe, leading to Lynch and Neff's first and only live performance together at the Olympia in Paris, France, in November 2002. Critical response to BlueBOB was largely mixed.

== Recording ==
David Lynch and John Neff met in February 1997 when Neff was commissioned to design and install Lynch's home studio, Asymmetrical Studio, at his home in Hollywood, California, United States. Neff completed installing the studio in August and was subsequently recruited as the recording engineer for Lux Vivens (1998), a studio album by Jocelyn Montgomery which was recorded at Asymmetrical Studio and produced by Lynch.

Lynch and Neff never intended on recording a complete album; the two originally began recording "four or five songs" as part of a series of "experiments" while testing Lynch's home studio in April 1998. Both Lynch and Neff programmed and sequenced patterns into drum machines, around which they would jam and write the instrumental basis of several songs. Lynch also performed occasionally on a real drum kit consisting of DW drums and Zildjian cymbals, but instead of performing parts with drum sticks he used his bare hands to hit the snare drum. "Pink Western Range" was the first of four songs written during these sessions, after which the decision was made to record a complete album. Subsequent recording sessions continued until March 2000, with Lynch and Neff both heading production and Neff engineering the sessions. Lynch and Neff also mixed BlueBOB, and Tom Baker mastered the album at Precision Mastering in Hollywood.

Neff recorded and performed lead vocal tracks on BlueBOB, though all of the lyrics were written by Lynch. Lynch would often hand the lyrics sheet to Neff just prior to a vocal take; Neff would improvise the phrasing of the lyrics during takes. Describing the experience, Neff said "David has absolutely no idea of what he wants in advance. When the atmosphere is created, he gives me the [lyrics]. It's like raising the sail without knowing which way the wind will blow". Lynch also handled effects sound design on Neff's vocals tracks on two songs "I Cannot Do That" and "Mountains Falling".

"I Cannot Do That"
Lynch was responsible for sound design and effects on Neff's lead-vocal tracks on "I Cannot Do That" and "Mountains Falling".

BlueBOB was recorded digitally using Digidesign (now Avid) Pro Tools, however Lynch and Neff used several analog effects units during recording, including a Boss OD-2 overdrive pedal; a Boss OC-2 pitch-shifting pedal; a Boss BF-2 flanging pedal; a Boss LT-2 limiting pedal; a Boss NS-2 noise suppression pedal and both Boss FT-2 and AW-2 envelope filter pedals. During the initial "experiments" sessions, Neff would program music which Lynch would then process by altering the controls on the effects pedals. Observing the sessions, Boss Users Group Magazine writer Sam Molineaux said Lynch's in-studio writing process was "an individualistic approach to composition that seems more rooted in artistic whim than music theory or instrumental technique."

== Composition ==
=== Music ===
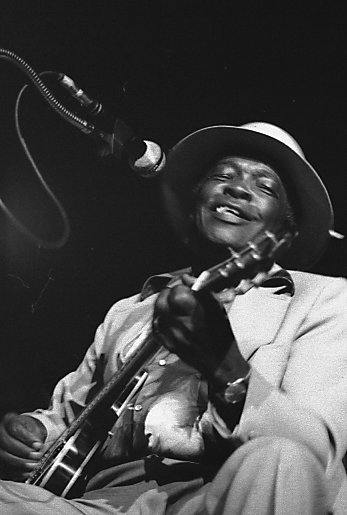
Lynch and Neff's sound on BlueBOB was influenced by John Lee Hooker (pictured in 1978)

Neff has described the style of BlueBOB as "factory rock" and "a combination of heavy metal and 1956-era rock 'n' roll". The album's official press release referred to it as "industrial blues", which the Los Angeles Times considered "an apt description for the guttural sonic atmosphere of distorted guitars, stark production and Neff's netherworld vocals." Neff said that both he and Lynch had intended to create a "heavy blues" record and cited John Lee Hooker as a mutual influence on the album's sound; Lynch had a desire to incorporate heavy industrial beats, which he described as "like dogs on PCP". Inspired by "machines, fire, smoke & electricity", Neff considered BlueBOB's sound to be "dark music" due to Lynch's tendencies of writing several of the album's songs in minor keys and Neff often performing keyboards in lower octaves. The final sound of the album, described by the Los Angeles Times as featuring a "space-age bluesy atmosphere and dark scenarios", drew comparisons to Tom Waits and Captain Beefheart.

During BlueBOB's recording sessions Lynch performed electric guitars with them placed on his lap and often used the slide guitar technique with a bottleneck; Neff attributed Lynch's use of slide guitar to his preference for "organic sounds". Lynch's use of a bottleneck resulted in guitar sounds featuring excessive vibrato. He also used several distortion effects pedals and experimented with noise in his amplifiers to further affect his guitar sound. Lynch had two main guitar chains. His first chain consisted of a Roland VG-8 emulation processor and a Roland GR-33 guitar synthesizer; his second chain consisted of several Boss pedals, including a LM-2 limiter pedal, a NS-2 noise suppression pedal, an OC-2 pitch-shifting pedal and an OD-2 overdrive pedal. Lynch used three guitars during the sessions—a self-designed and custom-built Fernandes Blackbird, a 1965 Gibson ES-330 and a Parker Fly—and recorded his parts in stereo into two Ampeg V4 tube amplifier.

Neff's guitar sound on BlueBOB was achieved by using a mixture of Gibson, Fender, Danelectro and Martin electric guitars—including a 1989 Fender Telecaster with a computerized self-tuning system—through several Marshall, Fender and Ampeg amplifiers. Neff also created a custom MIDI-based guitar rig known as "Guitarkestra", which he used on three tracks: "Mountains Falling", "Pink Western Range" and "City of Dreams".

BlueBOB's percussion tracks—featured prominently on "Rollin' Down (To My House)", "Pink Western Range" and "City of Dreams"—were created by Lynch and Neff sampling the noise of different machines.

=== Lyrics ===
In a writing process differing from his previous projects such as Julee Cruise's Floating into the Night (1989), Lynch's wrote the lyrics to BlueBOB after all the music had been recorded. Explaining the method to Objectif Cinema in 2002, Lynch said:

"For Julee Cruise, many times the lyrics came first. I would just write out things and then I showed them to Angelo Badalamenti. And there it was the reverse, the words would conjure some sort of melody. So it can go both ways. [On BlueBOB] it was the lyrics that followed the music."

Lynch's lyrics were sometimes written specifically for the album and others were selected from poems and lyrics he had written "during the last twenty years", according to Neff. The Los Angeles Times reported that BlueBOB's lyrics contain "fragments of L.A. noir", including Lynch's fascination with Marilyn Monroe (after whom one song is titled), as well as "Lynchian dark humor, sexual intrigue and dire plot twists"; a second article in the same newspaper noted lyrical themes of paranoia. Lynch wrote the lyrics to all of the album's songs, which Neff performed in a "largely spoken" vocal style.

== Packaging ==
BlueBOB's was originally released in a black 8-inch×8-inch box set, with a 16-page booklet containing lyrics, personnel credits, performance credits and black-and-white photography by Lynch; Lynch also designed BlueBOB's sleeve. Lynch's photography includes close-up shots of industrial equipment and musical instruments, as well as landscapes of abandoned factories. The booklet's back-cover photograph of Neff and Lynch—in which Lynch is depicted as "the Groper" from the music video for "Thank You, Judge" (see Release)—was shot by Eli Roth. Subsequent pressings of BlueBOB were released in a standard jewel case.

Lynch's original title for the album was 2960 instead of BlueBOB. Asked about the significance of the numbers by the French magazine Les Inrockuptibles, Neff said: "[Lynch] will not tell me." According to Lynch, BlueBOB's title was Neff's idea.

== Release ==
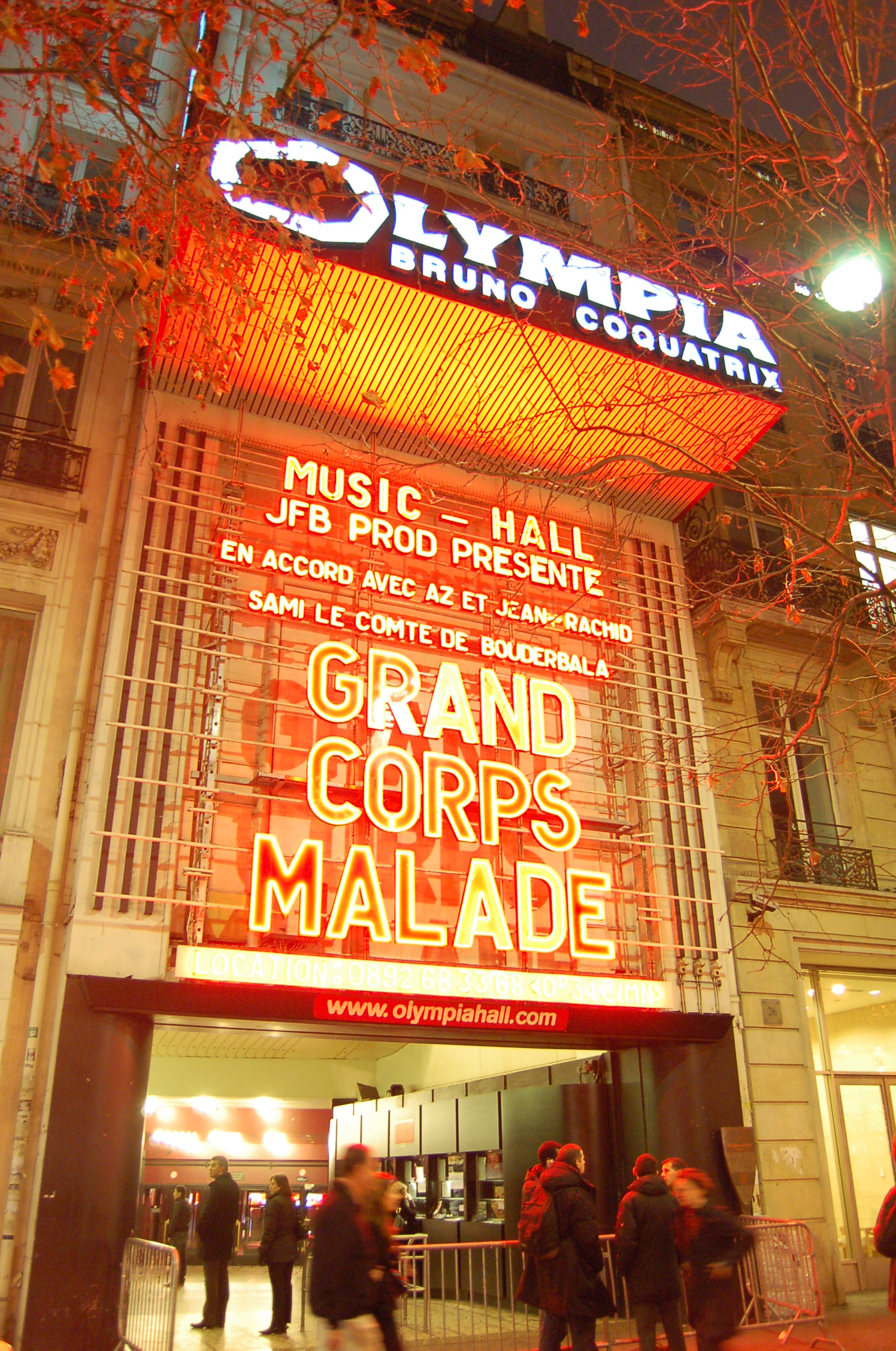
Olympia in Paris, France (pictured in 2009), where Lynch and Neff performed their first-and-only concert in support of BlueBOB in November 2002

BlueBOB was originally released on CD in December 2001 on Lynch's own record label Absurda and only made available from his official website. Lynch opted to release the album on his website due to the "big change going on" with record labels and because he considered Internet distribution as "the way to go." The album was reissued in 13 European countries on Soulitude Records, an independent label owned by Pascal Nabet Meyer, in 2002, where it received "strong press interest". Soulitude reissued BlueBOB in the U.S. in April 2003.

BlueBOB was performed live at Lynch and Neff's first-and-only-ever live performance together at Olympia in Paris, France, on November 11, 2002. The sold-out show accompanied the album's launch on Soulitude in Europe. Lynch and Neff were joined by four other musicians, including Nabet Meyer whose work included Rickie Lee Jones "Flying Cowboys and Sling Blades soundtrack; Lynch performed electric guitar at the concert. Though Lynch was "thrilled about the opportunity" to perform, he has since referred to the experience as "torment", as well as a "traumatic thrill" and "beautiful". According to Neff, Lynch was "real nervous about playing" as he had never performed live music before. The performance was part of a music festival by the French cultural magazine Les Inrockuptibles, with Beth Gibbons of Portishead, French singer Philippe Katerine and American musician RJD2 all performing at the same venue on this evening.

Neff considered the idea of creating a multimedia theater presentation to promote BlueBOB's release in the U.S., as "radio exposure outside of public and college stations [was] unlikely." However, Lynch did not commit to the idea and it never reached fruition.

"Go Get Some" and an instrumental version of "Mountains Falling" are featured in Lynch's 2001 feature film Mulholland Drive and on its accompanying soundtrack album; "Pretty 50s", another Lynch and Neff track, is also included on the soundtrack. A music video for "Thank You, Judge"—featuring Naomi Watts, Eli Roth, Lynch and Neff—was directed by Lynch and made available on his official website soon after the album's release.

== Reception ==
Professional ratings
Review scores
Source	Rating
AllMusic	3/5 stars
Stylus Magazine	B

BlueBOB received mixed critical responses upon its release. In one of the album's earliest reviews in Les Inrockuptibles in 2001, critic Stéphane Deschamps described BlueBOB as "a kind of mutant music, massive and threatening to basic blues and industrial music"; Deschamps praised BlueBOB's "creepy … ambiguous and refined" lyrics and likened its sound to various surf artists, including Gene Vincent and Link Wray, writing that their "primitive and seminal" influence were the album's "best moments".

Writing for Stylus Magazine, reviewer Gentry Boeckel said "David Lynch's newest foray into noise is not unlike his better films: effortful, atmospheric, and best taken just as it is". Boeckel considered the instrumental tracks—"Factory Interlude", "Blue Horse" and "Go Get Some"—as the standout parts of BlueBOB and believed it "lack[ed] of a strong contrasting presence" and that "the album may seem too monotonous for some tastes. However, Neff and Lynch's creation lives up to its billing as the first 'industrial-blues' album—and much like Lynch's work in film, you either love it or hate it: but you can't deny its inescapable mood." Bockel awarded the album a "B" rating.

AllMusic writer Heather Phares said in a largely mixed three-out-of-five-star review that "most of the pieces [on BlueBOB] aren't quite as evocative as Lynch and Neff's soundtrack work" and the tracks "aren't immediate enough to work as rock songs", but said the album contained "interesting moments" when Lynch and Neff "mix the banal and the bizarre in a way that possibly only Lynch fans could truly appreciate." Phares also criticized the album's "overdependence" on Neff's vocals, writing that "his raspy, sardonic voice adds an edge to some of the tracks but wears out its welcome relatively quickly", but summarized it as "dark, disjointed, unpredictable and highly unique".

In his "Real Life Rock Top Ten" column for City Pages, critic Greil Marcus referred to BlueBOB as "Link Wray opens for Pere Ubu" and the track "I Cannot Do That" as "the musical equivalent of an outtake from Lost Highway, furiously sustained." Marcus considered "Thank You, Judge" as the "hit" of the album and called it an "R&B divorce-court novelty."

== Track listing ==
All lyrics are written by David Lynch; all music is composed by David Lynch and John Neff.

BlueBob track listing
No.	Title	Length
1.	"9–1–1"	3:47
2.	"Rollin' Down (To My House)"	4:55
3.	"Thank You, Judge"	5:48
4.	"I Cannot Do That"	4:17
5.	"Factory Interlude" (Instrumental)	0:26
6.	"Blue Horse" (Instrumental)	7:21
7.	"Bad Night"	4:57
8.	"Mountains Falling"	8:16
9.	"Go Get Some" (Instrumental)	7:10
10.	"Pink Western Range" (also known as "In the Pink Western Range")	4:09
11.	"Marilyn Monroe"	5:39
12.	"City of Dreams"	6:21
Total length:		63:12

== Personnel ==
All personnel credits adapted from BlueBOB's album notes.

Performers

- David Lynch – drums (1, 6, 7), guitar (1–4, 6–12), percussion (2, 10, 12), backing vocals (3), sound effects (5, 7, 11, 12), drum effects (9)
- John Neff – guitar (1–4, 6, 7, 9–12), bass (1–12), vocals (1–4, 7, 8, 10–12), drums (3, 5, 6, 8, 9, 11), backing vocals (3), percussion (10)

Technical personnel

- David Lynch – production, mixing, vocal-effects sound design (4, 8), ambient sound design (5)
- John Neff – production, engineering, mixing
- Tom Baker – mastering

Design personnel

- David Lynch – design, photography
- Eli Roth – photography
