= Images (book) =

1994 book by David Lynch

- Cover
- Author: David Lynch
- Language: English
- Genre: Photo book, painting
- Publisher: Hyperion Books
- Publication date: 1994
- Publication place: United States
- Media type: Print (Hardback)
- Pages: 191
- ISBN: 0-7868-6060-X
- OCLC: 29877740
- Dewey Decimal: 791.43/0233/092 20
- LC Class: PN1998.3.L96 A25 1994

Images, first published in 1994, is a book by David Lynch. The book "in which he chooses representative selections from his various modes of self-expression" may serve as an introduction to his own work.

== Contents ==
Moving Images

- Twin Peaks: Fire Walk with Me
- Industrial Symphony No. 1
- Wild at Heart
- Twin Peaks
- The Cowboy and the Frenchman
- Blue Velvet
- Dune
- The Elephant Man
- Eraserhead
- Alphabet
- The Grandmother
- The Amputee

Images

- Paintings and Drawings
- Ricky Boards and Bee Boards
- Industrial
- Organic Phenomena
- Fish Kit
- Chicken Kit
- Snowmen from Boise
- Postmodern Mood Structures
- Nudes and Smoke
- Distributors
- Spark Plugs
- Meaningless Conversations
- Dental Hygiene

== Reception ==
In her monograph on Lynch's photographic work, Petra Giloy-Hirtz states that Images "offers a window into the iconic filmmaker's creative vision."
