= The Air Is on Fire =

Art retrospective

The Air Is on Fire was a retrospective on the art work of artist and filmmaker David Lynch using themes from his childhood, adolescent, and adult life. It ran from February 24 to May 27, 2007, at the Fondation Cartier pour l'Art Contemporain in Paris. The exhibition was also presented in 2009 in Moscow, Russia, updated with a series of lithographs made in 2007–8.

The exhibition was later shown at Gl Strand in Copenhagen, Denmark from September 26, 2010, to January 16, 2011.

The soundscape accompanying the exhibition was released as a CD in 2007. It was subsequently reissued on vinyl through Sacred Bone Records on the Record Store Day of 2014.
