= Room to Dream =

Book by David Lynch and Kristine McKenna

- Author: David Lynch, Kristine McKenna
- Language: English
- Genre: Memoir
- Publication date: 2018

Room to Dream is a 2018 memoir by David Lynch and Kristine McKenna.

As Rolling Stone indicated, " The book includes snippets compiled from over 100 interviews with everyone from family to collaborators throughout the visionary’s life."

Vulture interview

It’s interesting to go back over your life. There are over 7.5 billion people on Earth and every life is different. You pop out of your mother and your life starts. So many things happen in the first hour! And it’s like, how come somebody becomes a scientist? Certain gates are opened for them. How you got to where you got is interesting.

— David Lynch, Interview in Vulture, 25 June 2018

== Reception ==
A review in The Guardian concluded, "Room to Dream feels a bit like a valedictory festschrift, but it provides a remarkable insight into Lynch’s intense commitment to the “art life”, from his painting, photography and music to furniture design."

NPR found that the book "charm[ed] but [didn't] demystify" while the Financial Times commented, "One of Hollywood’s great auteurs tries to reinvent the memoir — by revealing nothing".
