= The Air Is on Fire (album) =

Soundtrack album by David Lynch
- Released: March 15, 2007
- Genre: Ambient
- Length: 58:23 (CD); 41:46 (LP)
- Label: Strange World; Sacred Bones

David Lynch chronology
Catching the Big Fish: Meditation, Consciousness, and Creativity (2006)	The Air Is on Fire (2007)	David Lynch's Inland Empire: Soundtrack (2007)

The Air Is on Fire is a soundtrack album by the American director and musician David Lynch. It was released on March 15, 2007 on Strange World Music. The soundtrack was composed by Lynch and collaborator Dean Hurley, and accompanied Lynch's exhibition of paintings, photographs and drawings of the same name at Fondation Cartier pour l'Art Contemporain in Paris, France, in 2007.

Originally issued on CD, a limited-edition LP of The Air Is on Fire was released in April 2014 on Sacred Bones Records as part of Record Store Day. The LP was limited to 2,000 copies.

== Composition ==
In an interview on Arte Radio in 2007, Dean Hurley used various phrases to describe The Air Is on Fire's sound, including "a large flashbulb paparazzi sound", "short drum machine phrases", "brief phrases of machines working", "dubbed industrial hip hop", "characteristic winds", "punch-presses pitched down", "train mechanisms and large steel-factory samples" and "metal structures that were welded together."

== Reception ==
Professional ratings
Review scores
Source	Rating
Pitchfork	7.8/10

Writing for Pitchfork, critic Marc Masters gave The Air Is on Fire a positive review. Masters drew comparisons between the album's sound and the styles of Demdike Stare and the Haxan Cloak and said that "even at its densest, The Air Is on Fire is pretty simple sonically, which gives it a universal tone. It's not about cutting-edge techniques or never-heard-before concoctions. It's about using sound to tell a wordless story and evoke undefined emotions. On those counts, it succeeds thoroughly."

== Track listing ==
All music is composed by David Lynch and Dean Hurley.

2007 CD track listing
No.	Title	Length
1.	"Untitled"	12:40
2.	"Untitled"	6:50
3.	"Untitled"	3:09
4.	"Untitled"	3:56
5.	"Untitled"	11:58
6.	"Untitled"	6:37
7.	"Untitled"	4:16
8.	"Untitled"	8:52
Total length:		58:23

2014 LP track listing

Side A
No.	Title	Length
1.	"Untitled"	21:48

Side B
No.	Title	Length
2.	"Untitled"	19:58
Total length:		41:46

== Personnel ==
All personnel credits adapted from The Air Is on Fire's album notes.

- Dean Hurley – instrumentation, arrangement, recording, editing, mixing
- David Lynch – instrumentation, sound design, recording, design, cover art
- Sacred Bones Design – additional design (2014 LP reissue)
