= Blue Velvet: The Lost Footage =

Blue Velvet: The Lost Footage is a 2011 compilation of deleted scenes and alternate takes from David Lynch's 1986 Academy Award-nominated cult classic Blue Velvet.

== Content ==
The previously lost footage (which was eventually found in a Seattle warehouse) includes the following: a completely different introduction to Jeffery Beaumont in college witnessing a rape before calling the rapist out, Jeffery is forced to end his college life due to his ill mother being unable to pay, extended scenes with Aunt Barbara (Frances Bay) who has dementia, a surreal scene involving a dog eating dinner at The Slow Club for unspecified reasons and extending scenes with Sandy's boyfriend Mike alongside a dinner scene with Sandy's family, Mike and Jeffery.

== Home media ==
It was released as a special feature three times: the first being the 25th Anniversary Edition Blu-ray on November 8, 2011, by MGM Home Entertainment, the second time re-released by The Criterion Collection on May 28, 2019 and the third on 4K Ultra Blu-ray June 25, 2024.

== See also ==
- Twin Peaks: The Missing Pieces - compilation of deleted scenes from Lynch's 1992 prequel Twin Peaks: Fire Walk with Me
- Director's cut
- Fan edit
