= I'm Waiting Here =

Single by David Lynch and Lykke Li

from the album The Big Dream
- Released: June 3, 2013
- Recorded: 2012 at Asymmetrical Studio in Los Angeles, California
- Genre: Rock; dream pop
- Length: 5:02
- Label: Sacred Bones
- Songwriters: Dean Hurley; Lykke Li
- Producer: David Lynch

David Lynch singles chronology
"Pinky's Dream" (2012)	"I'm Waiting Here" (2013)	"Are You Sure" / "Star Dream Girl" (2013)

Lykke Li singles chronology
"Youth Knows No Pain" (2011)	"I'm Waiting Here" (2013)	"No Rest for the Wicked" (2014)

Music video
- "I'm Waiting Here" on YouTube

"I'm Waiting Here" is a song by the American film director and musician David Lynch. It is the thirteenth track and lead single from Lynch's third studio album The Big Dream (2013), and was released on June 3, 2013 on Sacred Bones Records. Produced by Lynch, "I'm Waiting Here" features vocals by the Swedish singer-songwriter Lykke Li, who co-wrote the song with Lynch collaborator Dean Hurley. Critical response to the song was largely positive and a music video was released.

== Music video ==
The music video for "I'm Waiting Here" was based on concepts by Lykke Li and visual artist Daniel Desure. It features cinematography by Nicholas Trikonis, and was edited by Jesse Fleming and Sadie Strangio. It was premiered on both Lynch's and Li's official YouTube channels on June 10, 2013. The video features some shots taken from the front of a car traveling a long and empty desert road and has been described by BlackBook as "beautiful in its simplicity", "the perfect, tranquil, seductive, and meditative accompaniment for the song" and its imagery "harkening back to Lynch's affinity for the road and the vast possibility of spaces that transcend forever."

== Release and reception ==
"I'm Waiting Here" was released as The Big Dream's lead single on June 3, 2013. It was made available for digital download on iTunes and for stream on the online music service Spotify. A 7-inch version of "I'm Waiting Here" was included as a bonus item with LP versions of The Big Dream. It features an "etching hand-inscribed by Lynch" on the single's B-side.

Critical reception to "I'm Waiting Here" was largely positive. Stereogum writer Tom Breihan said the song "isn't exactly 'low-down blues,' but you could see how it's Lynch's version of the stuff. It's a smothered torch song with a narcotized vocal from his guest" and drew comparisons between it and Lynch's "beautiful, faraway" material produced with Julee Cruise for the television series Twin Peaks. Spin reviewer Christ Martins referred to "I'm Waiting Here" as "a dreamy and noir swooner replete with slow-dance swing and bassy atmospheric swells" and Fact described the song as "a lilting, 50s-inspired number [that] harks back instantly to Lynch's pioneering work with Julee Cruise back in the late 80s, and is a return to a smoky sound many fans thought was missing on his last record." Alex Hudson of Exclaim! also described the song as "atmospheric, guitar-driven electro-waltz." Lynch himself praised Li's performance on the song, saying: "she brought her own style to this song, which has a doo-wop sort of thing going on, but in a way it's far-removed from the [19]50s."

== In popular culture ==
The song has been used as background music on-board flights for the airline Norwegian from August 2013.

== Track listing ==
Digital download and 7-inch single (Sacred Bones Records, sbr109)

1. "I'm Waiting Here" – 5:02
