= I Am the Shaman =

2010 single by Donovan

Single by Donovan

from the album Ritual Groove
- Released: 10 May 2021
- Studio: Asymmetrical Studio, Hollywood, California, United States
- Genre: Psychedelic folk
- Length: 4:23
- Label: Donovan Discs
- Songwriter(s): Donovan Leitch
- Producer(s): David Lynch; Dean Hurley

"I Am the Shaman" is a song written by Scottish singer Donovan. It was originally released on his 2010 album Ritual Groove. The song and its music video were produced by experimental director and musician David Lynch, with whom Donovan has a shared interest in transcendental meditation. The music video was released in celebration of Donovan's 75th birthday on 10 May 2021.

== Recording ==
Donovan wrote of the collaboration:

He had asked me to only bring in a song just emerging, not anywhere near finished. We would see what happens. It happened! I composed extempore… the verses came naturally. New chord patterns effortlessly appeared.

The song was recorded in Lynch's Los Angeles studio. While the verses are reflective of the folk music which Donovan has been associated with, the choruses, as with much of the ambient atmosphere, are of a more experimental nature. The instrumentation and lyrics of the chorus were produced by reversing the recording. The song was originally recorded for Donovan's 2010 album Ritual Groove, but the music video was produced eleven years later.

It was all impromptu … I visited the studio and David said, "Sit at the mics with your guitar Don". David in same room behind control desk with my Linda. He had asked me to only bring in a song just emerging, not anywhere near finished. We would see what happens.
