= The Big Dream =

Studio album by David Lynch
- Released: July 10, 2013
- Recorded: 2012 at Asymmetrical Studio in Los Angeles, California
- Genres: Avant-rock; blues; electronica; dream pop
- Length: 50:14
- Labels: Sacred Bones; Sunday Best
- Producers: Dean Hurley; David Lynch

David Lynch chronology
Crazy Clown Time (2011)	The Big Dream (2013)	The Big Dream Remix EP (2013)

Singles from The Big Dream
- 1. "I'm Waiting Here" Released: June 3, 2013; 2. "Are You Sure"/"Star Dream Girl" Released: June 24, 2013

The Big Dream is the third and final studio album by the American film director and musician David Lynch, released on July 10, 2013. It was released on Sacred Bones Records in the United States and Sunday Best in Europe. Consisting of 12 "modern blues" songs, The Big Dream was recorded and produced by Lynch with his frequent musical collaborator Dean Hurley at Lynch's own Asymmetrical Studio in Los Angeles, California during 2012.

Two singles were released from The Big Dream; "I'm Waiting Here", a collaboration with the Swedish singer-songwriter Lykke Li, was released as the album's lead single and the double A-side single "Are You Sure"/"Star Dream Girl" followed as the album's second single. Both singles were part of an enigmatic promotional campaign conceived by Lynch for The Big Dream, which included cryptic video uploads on various social media websites, including YouTube and Vine. Upon its release The Big Dream received warm reviews and was a moderate commercial success, placing in a number of international record charts.

== Composition ==
The Big Dream consists of eleven original songs composed by David Lynch and producer Dean Hurley, as well as a Bob Dylan cover. In an interview with Billboard Lynch discussed the songwriting process of The Big Dream, as well as the composition of the album. Describing the songwriting process, Lynch said that "sometimes the lyrics come first but mostly the music is talking to you about how it wants to be, and then the lyrics are born out of that." He added that most of the songs were "based on the blues and start with a jam" between himself and Hurley. Lynch further explained that the songs are "tighter" than those on his debut studio album, Crazy Clown Time (2011), due to increased confidence in his musical abilities. Regarding the Bob Dylan cover "The Ballad of Hollis Brown", Lynch said it is "not really a cover of Bob Dylan as much as it is a cover of a Nina Simone cover of Bob Dylan" and noted that the song was "important for the sequence" of the album."

== Release ==
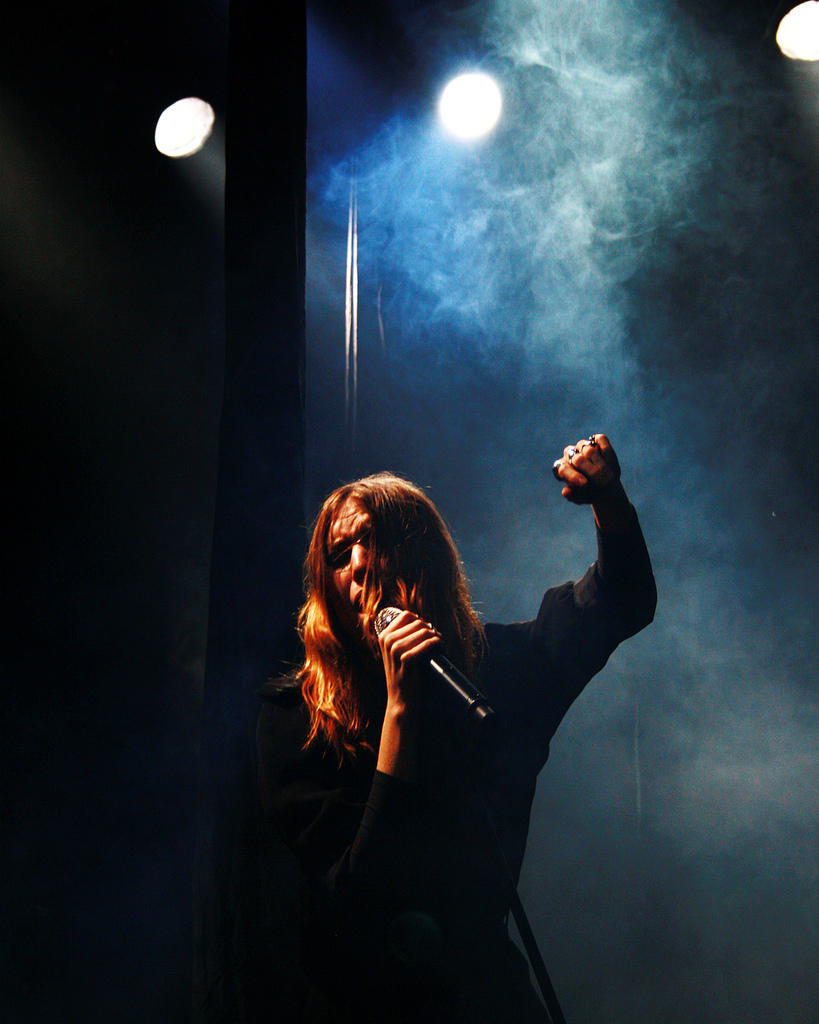
Swedish singer-songwriter Lykke Li (pictured in 2011) was a guest musician on The Big Dream, performing lead vocals on "I'm Waiting Here".

The Big Dream was released on July 10, 2013 on Beatink Records in Japan, July 15 on Sunday Best in Europe and on INGRID in Sweden, and July 16 on Sacred Bones Records in the United States. It was released on CD, double LP and made available as a digital download. TBD716, an enigmatic 43-second trailer for The Big Dream, was uploaded to David Lynch's YouTube channel on May 31, 2013—four days prior to the album's official announcement—and a six-second looped clip of the trailer was later uploaded to Lynch's personal Vine account.

In further promotion of the album, two singles were released. "I'm Waiting Here", an iTunes bonus track featuring Swedish singer-songwriter Lykke Li, was released as The Big Dream's lead single on June 3, 2013 and the double A-side single, "Are You Sure"/"Star Dream Girl", was released on June 24. A limited edition 7" version of "I'm Waiting Here", featuring hand-inscribed etchings by Lynch, was made available with double LP editions of the album.

The Big Dream was a moderate commercial success. In the United States' Billboard charts the album peaked at number 5 on the Heatseekers Albums chart, number 40 on the Independent Albums chart and number 10 on the Tastemaker Albums chart. The album entered the UK Independent Albums Chart at number 20 and the UK Independent Album Breakers Chart at number 2. It charted elsewhere internationally, including the Belgian Albums Chart in both Flanders and Wallonia, France, Germany, Japan and Switzerland.

== Reception ==
Professional ratings
Aggregate scores
Source	Rating
Metacritic	64/100
Review scores
Source	Rating
AllMusic	3.5/5 stars
Boston Globe	Positive
Consequence of Sound	3/5 stars
Drowned in Sound	7/10
The Guardian	4/5 stars
MusicOMH	4/5 stars
NME	7/10
Paste	8.2/10
Pitchfork	6.3/10
Slant Magazine	2.5/5 stars

Upon its release The Big Dream received generally positive reviews. At Metacritic, which assigns a normalized rating out of 100 to reviews from mainstream critics, the album received an average score of 64, based on 28 reviews indicating "generally favourable reviews". AllMusic's Heather Phares rated the album three and a half out of five stars and noted how it "pushes the blues' boundaries", adding it "uses elements of the genre as a jumping-off point for his experiments" and "honors the blues' lust for life and its lonely heart." Writing for the Boston Globe, James Reed wrote positively of The Big Dream and described it as "a modern blues as filtered through Lynch's warped mind, where life unfolds in the shadows in slow motion." Consequence of Sound reviewer Paula Mejia referred to the album as "a series of vignettes, character-driven narratives rather than a revolution around a certain thematic concept" and said that "the frustrations within The Big Dream lie in the pauses, which require a certain degree of patience", awarding the album three out of five stars. Matthew Slaughter of Drowned in Sound rated the album seven out of ten, said it is "as warped and wondrous a vision as Lynch has produced in recent times, teeming with his usual cast of naïve dreamers, warped killers and femme fatales", summarising it as "brilliant, inconsistent, pleasing [and] frustrating."

Writing for The Guardian, Paul MacInnes rated The Big Dream four of five stars and drew comparisons to Lynch's films, stating "a fusion of blues and early rock'n'roll styles with electronic production techniques, you are dragged into an American wilderness where the land is parched, the sky crackles with electricity, and there's a pair of glowing red eyes watching you from a distance." musicOMH writer Aaron Payne described the album as "a thoroughly decent album from start to finish", noted that "I'm Waiting Here" is "near-perfect addition" to the album, and awarded it four out of five stars. NME's Phil Hebblethwaite noted how The Big Dream's "formula", which consists of "straightforward tracks", "a massive left turn into Weird Town" after the album's midpoint and "a sweet one-two" towards the end of it. Hebblethwaite rated the album seven out of ten. In a mixed two and a half star review for Slant Magazine, Jesse Cataldo wrote that despite it being "undoubtedly well recorded, with a sustained mood and some nice sonic touches", the album "still has a thin, larky feel, briefly amusing, consistently strange, but rarely resonant."

Paste's Robert Ham praised the album and wrote: "What the world is privy to now with The Big Dream is Lynch’s version of the blues. Not just the musical style, but also a thrilling sound that encompasses every shade of its representative color. There's the midnight blue of slow, moody tracks [...] the strange denim tones [...] and a strange bright splash of periwinkle to close out the album." Mark Richardson of Pitchfork was more critical, noting that the album had "the same weaknesses and strengths" as his debut album. Richardson added that Lynch "takes musical elements from his youth—the sock-hop ballads of Bobby Vinton, the gnarled guitar instruments of Link Wray, both of which are common in his films—and gives them a modern but still homemade sheen, topping the reverb-heavy dreaminess of the music with half-sung lyrics in Lynch’s distinctively nasally register."

== Track listing ==
All tracks are written by David Lynch and Dean Hurley unless otherwise noted.

The Big Dream track listing
No.	Title	Writer(s)	Length
1.	"The Big Dream"		4:07
2.	"Star Dream Girl"		3:27
3.	"Last Call"		3:48
4.	"Cold Wind Blowin'"		3:49
5.	"The Ballad of Hollis Brown"	Bob Dylan	5:12
6.	"Wishing Well"		3:39
7.	"Say It"		3:58
8.	"We Rolled Together"		4:00
9.	"Sun Can't Be Seen No More"		4:40
10.	"I Want You"		3:47
11.	"The Line It Curves"		6:01
12.	"Are You Sure"		3:46
Total length:			50:14

iTunes bonus track and LP bonus 7"
No.	Title	Writer(s)	Length
13.	"I'm Waiting Here" (featuring Lykke Li)	Lykke Li, Dean Hurley	5:02
Total length:			55:16

Japanese CD bonus track
No.	Title	Length
13.	"And Light Shines"	3:41
Total length:		53:55

== Personnel ==
All personnel credits adapted from The Big Dream's liner notes.

- David Lynch – vocals, guitar, synthesizer, percussion, production (on "I'm Waiting Here"), mixing, arrangement, design
- David Correll – layout
- Dean Hurley – guitar, synthesizer, organ, bass, drums, programming, production (1–12), engineering, mixing, arrangement
- Lykke Li – vocals (on "I'm Waiting Here")
- Brian Lucey – mastering
- Riley Lynch – guitar (on "Sun Can't Be Seen No More")

== Chart positions ==
Chart (2013)	Peak position
Belgian Albums Chart (Flanders)	75
Belgian Albums Chart (Wallonia)	139
French SNEP Albums Chart	91
German Albums Chart	61
Japanese Oricon Albums Chart	104
Swiss Hitparade Albums Chart	87
UK Independent Albums Chart	20
UK Independent Album Breakers Chart	2
U.S. Billboard Heatseekers Albums	5
U.S. Billboard Independent Albums	40
U.S. Billboard Tastemaker Albums	10

== Release history ==
Region	Date	Format(s)	Label	Distributor	Catalogue
Japan	July 10, 2013	2×LP, CD, DD	Sunday Best	Beatink	BRC-384
Europe	July 15, 2013	2×LP, CD, DD	Sunday Best	PIAS	SBEST61
Sweden	July 15, 2013	2×LP, CD, DD	INGRID	PIAS	NGRD020
United States	July 16, 2013	2×LP, CD, DD	Sacred Bones	Bobkind	SBR-109
