= Twin Peaks Music: Season Two Music and More =

Soundtrack album by Angelo Badalamenti and David Lynch
- Released: October 30, 2007
- Recorded: Excalibur Sound (New York City), Capitol Recording (Hollywood, California), Group IV Recording (Los Angeles, California)
- Length: 1:11:05
- Label: Absurda; David Lynch
- Producer: Angelo Badalamenti; David Lynch

Angelo Badalamenti chronology
The Wicker Man (2006)	Twin Peaks Music: Season Two Music and More (2007)	The Edge of Love (2008)

David Lynch chronology
David Lynch's Inland Empire: Soundtrack (2007)	Twin Peaks Music: Season Two Music and More (2007)	Polish Night Music (with Marek Zebrowski) (2008)

Professional ratings
Review scores
Source	Rating
AllMusic	4/5 stars

Twin Peaks Music: Season Two Music and More is an album by Angelo Badalamenti and David Lynch released on October 30, 2007. It compiles the original music from season two of the drama series Twin Peaks, created by Lynch.

== Track listing ==
Twin Peaks Music: Season Two Music and More
No.	Title	Writer(s)	Length
1.	"Love Theme Intro"	Angelo Badalamenti	2:21
2.	"Shelly"	Badalamenti	2:17
3.	"New Shoes"	Badalamenti	3:48
4.	"High School Swing"	Badalamenti	1:51
5.	"Hayward Boogie"	Badalamenti	2:16
6.	"Blue Frank"	David Lynch	5:10
7.	"Audrey’s Prayer"	Badalamenti	2:10
8.	"I’m Hurt Bad"	Badalamenti	2:30
9.	"Cop Beat"	Badalamenti	1:56
10.	"Harold’s Theme"	Badalamenti	1:42
11.	"Barbershop"	Badalamenti	1:25
12.	"Night Bells"	Badalamenti	2:47
13.	"Just You"	Badalamenti	3:36
14.	"Drug Deal Blues"	Badalamenti	3:08
15.	"Audrey"	Badalamenti	2:26
16.	"Josie and Truman"	Badalamenti	4:32
17.	"Hook Rug Dance"	Badalamenti	2:24
18.	"Packards’ Vibration"	Badalamenti	2:39
19.	"Half Heart"	Badalamenti	5:31
20.	"Laura’s Dark Boogie"	Badalamenti	5:01
21.	"Dark Mood Woods / The Red Room"	Badalamenti	9:01
22.	"Love Theme Farewell"	Badalamenti	2:34
Total length:			1:11:05

== Personnel ==
Credits adapted from the liner notes of Twin Peaks Music: Season Two Music and More.

Performance

- Andy Armer - keyboard (track 6)
- Angelo Badalamenti - piano (tracks 1–4, 6–22); keyboard, synthesizer (tracks 1–5, 7–22)
- Vinnie Bell - electric guitar (tracks 1–5, 7–22)
- Lara Flynn Boyle - vocals (track 13)
- Ron Carter - bass (tracks 1–5, 7–22)
- David Cooper - vibraphone (all tracks)
- Eddie Daniels - clarinet (all tracks)
- Eddie Dixon - electric guitar (tracks 1–5, 7–22)
- Don Falzone - bass (track 6)
- Steven Hodges - drums (track 6)
- Jay Hoggard - vibraphone (all tracks)
- David Jaurequi - electric guitar (track 6)
- Kinny Landrum - keyboard, synthesizer (tracks 1–5, 7–22)
- Sheryl Lee - vocals (track 13)
- Albert Regni - clarinet (all tracks)
- Grady Tate - drums (tracks 1–5, 7–22)
- Buster Williams - bass (tracks 1–5, 7–22)
- Alicia Witt - piano (track 5)

Technical

- Angelo Badalamenti - production, executive production (all tracks); arrangement (tracks 1–5, 7–22)
- Tom Baker - mastering (all tracks)
- Daniel Coe - assistant to Badalamenti
- Dean Hurley - digital assembly, additional mixing (all tracks)
- Peter Iovino - photography
- David Lynch - production, executive production, additional mixing (all tracks); art direction, design
- Art Pohlemus - mixing (all tracks)
- Dean Tokuno - photography
- Kimberly Wright - photography
