= What Did Jack Do? =

2017 film

What Did Jack do?
- The film's Netflix poster
- Directed by: David Lynch
- Written by: David Lynch
- Produced by: Sabrina S. Sutherland
- Starring: David Lynch
- Cinematography: Scott Ressler
- Edited by: David Lynch
- Distributed by: Fondation Cartier; Netflix
- Release dates: November 8, 2017 (France); January 20, 2020 (Netflix)
- Running time: 17 minutes
- Country: United States
- Language: English

What Did Jack Do? is a 2017 American short surrealist comedy crime drama mystery film written, directed, and edited by David Lynch. Presented in black-and-white, it follows a detective (Lynch) who interrogates a talking capuchin monkey (voiced by Lynch) accused of committing a murder.

The film premiered at the Fondation Cartier in Paris on November 8, 2017. It was later released by Netflix on January 20, 2020.

== Premise ==
In a run-down train station café, a detective interrogates Jack, a talking capuchin monkey. They engage in a battle of wits, speaking almost entirely in animal-based puns and noirish one-liners, as the detective presses Jack to confess to the murder of someone named Max Clegg. Jack's evasive answers prove that he will not break easily. However, the detective soon finds Jack's weak spot: a chicken named Toototabon, whom Jack regards as the love of his life.

Jack confesses to murdering Max in a crime of passion, once he does several stage lights obscure the screen and Jack reappears, before performing a song called "True Love's Flame", Jack finishes the song when Toototabon appears. Jack pursues her as she runs away, begging her to come back to him. The film ends with the detective following Jack out of the room and is heard ordering his agents to arrest Jack for murder.

== Cast ==
- Jack Cruz as Jack, a monkey (credited as "Himself")
  - Katie as Jack (uncredited)
- David Lynch as Detective / Voice of Jack (uncredited)
- Toototabon as Toototabon, a chicken (credited as "Herself")
- Emily Stofle as Waitress

== Production ==
Lynch first mentioned the project during a December 2014 interview at the Middlesbrough Institute of Modern Art, where he was holding his "Naming" exhibition: "Right now I'm mostly writing [the third season of Twin Peaks], I've got a painting going, and I'm building a chair. I love to build things and this is for a monkey film. I'm working with a monkey named Jack and that'll come out sometime. It is not a chimpanzee—the monkey came from South America."

The film was eventually shot in 2016, with Lynch playing the detective and voicing the capuchin monkey title character with some light audio effects added and his mouth superimposed onto the monkey's face. The only other human character in the film, a waitress who serves the detective and the monkey coffee, was played by Lynch's then-wife Emily Stofle.

== Release ==
Lynch talked about the upcoming premiere with the Cahiers du cinéma on October 30, 2017: "I will be in Paris for the release of this book. I will sign copies at the Paris Photo fair. And then I will show my monkey film at the Fondation Cartier. It's a strange film of 17 minutes."

The film premiered at the Fondation Cartier in Paris on November 8, 2017, as part of the launch of Lynch's Nudes photo book published by the Fondation.

On May 20, 2018, the film had its U.S. premiere during Lynch's Festival of Disruption in New York City.

On January 20, 2020, Lynch's 74th birthday, the film was made available for streaming on Netflix.

== Reception ==
On review aggregator Rotten Tomatoes, the film has an approval rating of 93% based on 14 reviews, with an average score of 7.8/10.

John Squires of Bloody Disgusting called What Did Jack Do? an "oddball gem". Tambay Obensen of IndieWire referred to the film as "bizarre and unsettling" but "very funny" whether that was Lynch's intention or not.
