= Jocelyn West =

British musician

Jocelyn West (formerly Jocelyn Montgomery) is a British musician and actress.

West was a founding member of the band Miranda Sex Garden. After leaving the band in the early 1990s, she joined the medieval music ensemble Sinfonye, led by Stevie Wishart. In 1998, West sang songs written by Hildegard von Bingen for her debut solo album Lux Vivens that was produced by David Lynch. In 2009, West released her second solo album Salt Bird, the first under her new name Jocelyn West.
