= Chrystabell =

American singer

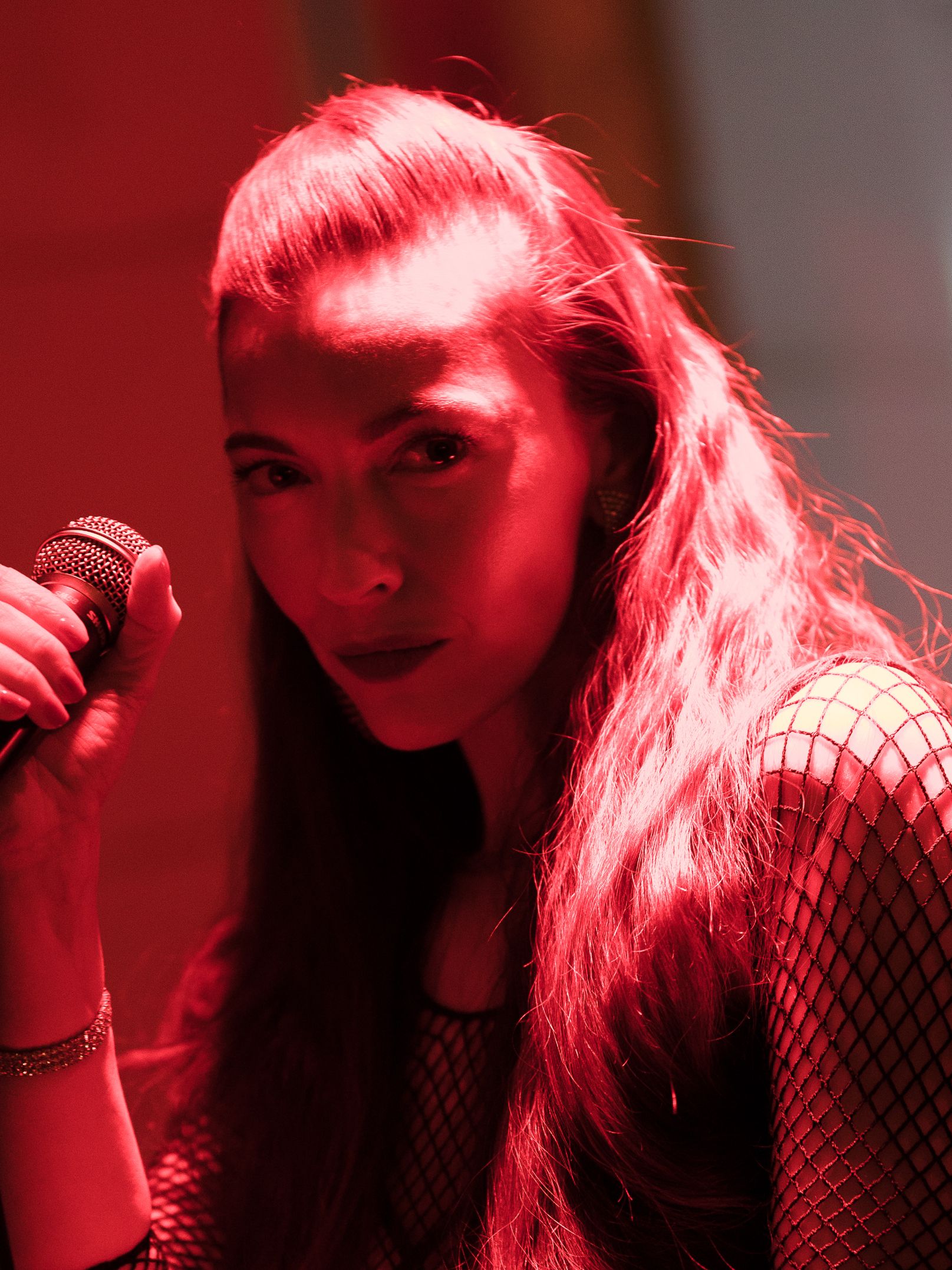
- Chrystabell in 2018
- Born: Chrysta Bell Zucht; April 20, 1978 (age 48); San Antonio, Texas, U.S.
- Occupations: Singer; songwriter; musician
- Musical career
- Genres: Synth-pop; art pop; dream pop; ethereal wave; ambient pop
- Instrument: Vocals
- Years active: 1998–present
- Labels: RCA; La Rose Noire; Meta Hari; Love Conquered; Sacred Bones
- Website: chrystabell.com

Chrysta Bell Zucht (born April 20, 1978), known professionally as Chrystabell, (Note: Previously spelled 'Chrysta Bell') is an American singer and songwriter, known for her collaborations with filmmaker David Lynch. Before working as a solo artist, she was the lead singer of the swing band 8½ Souvenirs, with whom she recorded two albums.

In 1999, an agent introduced her to David Lynch, beginning a fruitful creative relationship with the director. Together, they released three albums, This Train (2011), Somewhere in the Nowhere (2016) and Cellophane Memories (2024). She appeared on the 2017 revival of Twin Peaks as Special Agent Tamara Preston.

== Early life ==
Chrystabell was born Chrysta Bell Zucht in San Antonio, Texas in the United States on April 20, 1978. She was named after Christabel, the poem by Samuel Taylor Coleridge. Her family owns a cemetery, Countryside Memorial Park, and her father had a variety of jobs, including running a bed and breakfast and flying hot air balloons. Her mother (a singer) and her stepfather (a composer, producer and engineer) owned a recording studio that made advertising jingles. It was at this recording studio where she first began to record music as a child. Later in life, her father began a natural burial business with the family cemetery, which she inherited; these businesses inspired her 2017 album We Dissolve. From the ages of 13 to 18, she auditioned for film roles, getting just one role in the 1997 kung fu film Once Upon a Time in China and America. After high school she moved to Austin, Texas with plans to become an actress.

== Career ==
Chrystabell began writing music in 1995. She began her musical career after interviewing for a job as a cocktail waitress in Austin, when she suggested she could sing at the bar with an accompaniment. Her interviewer happened to be the wife of a member of the swing band 8½ Souvenirs, and suggested she audition for the band. She made her musical debut as the lead singer of 8½ Souvenirs, with whom she recorded two albums. In 2004, she relocated from Austin, Texas to Oakland, California.

=== Collaborating with David Lynch ===
Chrystabell was introduced to director David Lynch in 1998 at the age of 20, by an agent at RCA Victor who thought they would get along well. From this meeting developed an ongoing creative relationship encompassing music, film, and poetry. In 2007, her music was featured on the soundtrack of Lynch's film Inland Empire. In 2011, Lynch wrote and produced her debut album This Train, with Bell developing melodies for Lynch's poetry. The two also collaborated on her 2017 EP, Somewhere in the Nowhere. During the production process of Somewhere, Lynch suggested that she appear on Twin Peaks, which she later did, playing the role of Special Agent Tammy Preston in the show's third season.

=== Solo work ===
Chrystabell's first solo album, We Dissolve, was released in 2017, produced by John Parish. She was inspired by her family's natural burial cemetery, which she inherited on the death of her father. The album is more rock-oriented than her previous releases, which Parish hoped would help her "stand apart" from her association with Lynch. Her following album, Feels Like Love (2019), ventures into disco and post-punk, and was co-written with Chris Smart. She continued to collaborate with Smart for her 2022 record Midnight Star.

== Discography ==
- Happy Feet (with 8½ Souvenirs) (1998)
- Twisted Desire (with 8½ Souvenirs) (1999)
- Bitter Pills and Delicacies (produced in 2010, unreleased until 2021)
- This Train (with David Lynch) (2011)
- Somewhere in the Nowhere (with David Lynch) (2016)
- We Dissolve (2017)
- Feels Like Love (2019)
- Midnight Star (2022)
- Cellophane Memories (with David Lynch) (2024)
