= Catching the Big Fish =

Book by David Lynch

- Author: David Lynch
- Subject: Meditation; Self-help; Creativity
- Published: December 28, 2006 Tarcher
- Publication place: United States
- Pages: 192

Catching the Big Fish: Meditation, Consciousness, and Creativity is an autobiography and self-help guide written by American filmmaker David Lynch. It comprises 84 vignette-like chapters in which Lynch comments on a wide range of topics "from metaphysics to the importance of screening your movie before a test audience". Catching the Big Fish was inspired by Lynch's experiences with Transcendental Meditation (TM), which he began practicing in 1973. In the book, Lynch writes about his approach to filmmaking and other creative arts. Catching the Big Fish was published by Tarcher on December 28, 2006. In 2016 two exclusive Lynch's "q-and-a interviews with Paul McCartney and Ringo Starr" were added to 10th Anniversary Edition of the book.

== The book ==
The title refers to Lynch's idea that "ideas are like fish. If you want to catch little fish, you can stay in the shallow water. But if you want to catch the big fish, you've got to go deeper". To Lynch, going deeper means experiencing a deeper, more expanded state of consciousness, a transcendental or fourth state of consciousness, an experience he has during meditation but believes is rare in ordinary daily life. According to Lynch, this experience expands artistic capacity.

Lynch tells the reader that initially he did not want to meditate. He relates how he eventually began Transcendental Meditation on the advice of his sister. At the time, he was struggling to complete Eraserhead, his first feature film, and his first marriage was ending. He was out of money, with a young daughter to support. Lynch's father and brother admonished him to abandon Eraserhead and become responsible. Lynch started meditation and took a job delivering The Wall Street Journal for $50 a week. Before meditation, he felt empty. When he started meditation, he felt a "weight lifted" and fear and negativity dissolved. He saved money, kept his focus and slowly completed the movie over the next four years, one scene at a time. The lead actor stayed with the project and waited three years for Lynch to complete the film.

Lynch writes about the continuing effects of meditation on his creative process. He explains that his imagination is let loose by meditation and creative concepts surface while he is meditating. He believes that from meditation, he is uniquely open to creative ideas. These ideas inspired the rabbits and Greek prostitute characters in his film Inland Empire. From O. J. Simpson's trial came the idea for Bill Pullman's character in Lost Highway.

Lynch's creative innocence lends itself to his unconventional casting style. He writes that auditioning actors do not read from his script. Instead, they speak while he considers the possibility of the actor playing a part in the film. Often asked about the seeming conflict between the bliss he feels in meditation and his dark and violent films, Lynch reconciles the seeming disparity. The world is dark, he reasons, and films are stories about the world. Good and evil are components of stories. For Lynch, inner peace and "external edginess" can coexist. Lynch reveals that he does not see the need for an artist to suffer. He does not believe artists have to identify with the emotional characters they create. "Let your characters do the suffering", is his perspective. Artists can leave suffering behind without sacrificing their "edge". On the other hand, during a one-time, 30 second consultation, a "shrink" told him that psychological counseling could diminish Lynch’s creativity, causing Lynch to promptly end the session.

Lynch believes that meditation is a powerful inspirational tool for children. The book talks about schools where meditation is now part of the curriculum. Lynch says in meditation he experiences an "ocean of pure love, pure peace", which is "pure compassion". This gives him the ability to help others in a significant way. All proceeds from the book are donated to the David Lynch Foundation For Consciousness-Based Education and World Peace, which funds TM instruction in schools.

Lynch's book reviews his practical pointers for artists. He mentions the importance of allocating preparation time (i.e., getting set up), and uninterrupted time to create the finished project. He believes a seminal idea is sufficient to start the creative process, which proceeds based on the artist's "action and reaction". Likewise, an artist needs to be "receptive to ideas" rather than trying to formulate them. Ideas start as "fragments", which attract other ideas. Blue Velvet, for example, started with the thought of red lips, green lawns, and the song by Bobby Vinton. Lynch opines that the artist’s intuition guides the creative process so he knows if his direction is right. Artists need to be fully equipped (with appropriate work space and tools) to quickly harvest their fresh creative impulses.

Lynch feels strongly about digital video, saying he will not go back to film. He is developing a web series for On Networks based on Catching the Big Fish.

Catching the Big Fish is also available as an audiobook, with Lynch performing the audio.

== Reception ==
According to reviewers, the tone of Catching the Big Fish is "surprisingly gentle", "folksy" and "direct". Critics offered differing opinions about Lynch’s coverage of Transcendental Meditation. One commentator called Lynch's approach predominantly promotional, while another reviewer found minimal proselytizing on the topic. Commentators viewed the 84 vignette-like chapters as entertaining stories, uncontroverted advice, and "an unexpected delight" that unlocks the secret of Lynch’s distinctive imagination.

One reviewer observed the seeming conflict between the bliss Lynch experiences in his meditation and his life and the dark, disturbing, and bliss-less films Lynch creates. For another, Lynch's "gentle wisdom" came across as "encouraging, calming insights into the beyond". Another perceived deficiency in the book is the lack of details about Transcendental Meditation and how it's practiced, creating a "tantalizing but unsatisfying" effect and the feeling that the reader is "on the outside looking in". Ultimately, Lynch's love of creating films and transcendence along with his unique perspective are seen as themes that his admirers and would-be filmmakers can relish.
