= Hybrid discography =

- Studio albums: 6
- EPs: 2
- Soundtrack albums: 6
- Compilation albums: 5
- Singles: 18
- Music videos: 6

The following is a comprehensive discography of Hybrid, a British electronic music group. Their discography comprises four studio albums, five compilation albums, six soundtrack albums, three EPs, eighteen singles, and several other releases.

== Albums ==
=== Studio albums ===
Title	Album details	Peak chart positions		
Title	Album details	UK	UK Dance	US Dance
Wide Angle	Released: 13 September 1999; Label: Distinctive Records; Format: CD, cassette, digital download, vinyl	45	—	—
Morning Sci-Fi	Released: 13 October 2003; Label: Distinctive Records; Format: CD, digital download, vinyl	87	—	20
I Choose Noise	Released: 4 September 2006; Label: Distinctive Records; Format: CD, digital download	117	7	—
Disappear Here	Released: 29 March 2010; Label: Distinctive Records; Format: CD, digital download, vinyl	145	15	—
Light of the Fearless	Released: 27 July 2018; Label: Distinctive Records; Format: CD, digital download	—	7	—
Black Halo	Released: 9 July 2021; Label: Distinctive Records; Format: CD, digital download	—	1	—
"—" denotes a recording that did not chart or was not released in that territory.

=== Compilation albums ===
Title	Album details
Remix and Additional Production by...	Released: 5 November 2000; Label: Distinctive Records; Formats: CD, vinyl
Hybrid Present Y4K	Released: 20 September 2004; Label: Distinctive Records; Formats: CD, vinyl
Re_Mixed	Released: 22 October 2007; Label: Distinctive Records; Formats: CD, digital download
Soundsystem_01	Released: 14 July 2008; Label: Distinctive Records; Formats: CD, digital download
Classics	Released: 30 July 2012; Label: Distinctive Records; Formats: CD, digital download, box set
Shadow of the Fearless	Released: 24 December 2018; Label: Distinctive Records; Formats: CD, digital download

=== Soundtrack albums ===
Title	Album details
Ghost Recon: Future Soldier	Released: 1 January 2012; Label: Ubisoft Music; Formats: Digital download
Dead in Tombstone	Released: 15 October 2013; Label: Black Lot Music; Formats: Digital download
Driveclub	Released: 7 October 2014; Label: Sony Computer Entertainment Europe; Formats: Digital download, vinyl
Vice	Released: 30 May 2015; Label: Atlantic Screen Music; Formats: Digital download
Take Down	Released: 19 August 2016; Label: CAS Admin Ltd; Formats: Digital download
Interlude in Prague	Released: 29 May 2017; Label: Kill City Records; Formats: CD, digital download

== EPs ==
Title	Album details
I Choose Noise EP	Released: 8 August 2006; Label: Distinct'ive Records; Formats: CD, digital download
Re_Mixed EP 1	Released: 16 October 2007; Label: Distinct'ive Records; Formats: Digital download

== Singles ==
Title	Year	Peak chart positions		Album
Title	Year	UK	UK Dance	Album
"Fall Out of Love"	1996	—	—	Non-album single
"Finished Symphony"	1999	55	12	Wide Angle
"If I Survive" (featuring Julee Cruise)	1999	52	13	Wide Angle
"Kid 2000" (featuring Chrissie Hynde)	2000	32	23	Wide Angle
"True to Form" (featuring Peter Hook)	2003	59	5	Morning Sci-Fi
"Higher Than a Skyscraper"	2004	83	13	Morning Sci-Fi
"I'm Still Awake"	2004	79	11	Morning Sci-Fi
"Dogstar"	2006	—	—	I Choose Noise
"Falling Down" (featuring Judie Tzuke)	2006	—	—	I Choose Noise
"Dream Stalker"	2006	—	—	I Choose Noise
"The Formula of Fear"	2008	—	—	Disappear Here
"Break My Soul"	2010	—	—	Disappear Here
"Can You Hear Me" (featuring Tim Hutton)	2010	—	—	Disappear Here
"Disappear Here"	2010	—	—	Disappear Here
"Original Sin"	2011	—	—	Disappear Here
"Blind Side"	2011	—	—	Non-album single
"We Are Fearless"	2018	—	—	Light of the Fearless
"Light Up"	2018	—	—	Light of the Fearless
"Heart-Shaped Box (Nirvana Cover)"	2022	—	—	Non-album single
"Dogstar 2022"	2022	—	—	Non-album single
"—" denotes a recording that did not chart or was not released in that territory.

== Promotional releases ==
=== Albums ===
- The Remix Collection (1996)
- Music from the Forthcoming Album Wide Angle (1998)
- Views from Wide Angle (1999)
- Scores (2005)

=== Singles ===
- "Symphony" (1996)
- "Visible Noise" / "Know Your Enemy" (2002)
- "Gravastar" / "Celebrity Science" (2002)

== Remixes ==
Hybrid has produced over 100 remixes of more than 40 artists, including Radiohead, Alanis Morissette, U2, Filter, BT, DJ Rap, The Orb, Jean Michel Jarre, Gouryella, The Future Sound of London, UNKLE, Moby and The Crystal Method.

== Music videos ==
Year	Song	Director	Album
1999	"If I Survive" (featuring Julee Cruise)	None	Wide Angle
1999	"I Know" (featuring Julee Cruise)	None	Wide Angle
2010	"Break My Soul"	Mike Truman	Disappear Here
2010	"Can You Hear Me" (featuring Tim Hutton)	Mike Truman	Disappear Here
2010	"Disappear Here"	Mike Truman	Disappear Here
2011	"Blind Side"	Mike Truman	Non-album single
