= Classics (Hybrid album) =

Greatest hits album by Hybrid
- Released: 30 July 2012
- Recorded: 1999–2010
- Label: Distinct'ive Records
- Producer: Hybrid

Hybrid chronology
Soundsystem 01 (2008)	Classics (2012)

Professional ratings
Review scores
Source	Rating
Soundsphere	4/5 stars

Classics is a greatest hits album by British electronic music group Hybrid. The album contains songs from Hybrid's previous studio albums and also contains a cover of "Enjoy the Silence", originally by Depeche Mode. The cover was a result of a fan poll, where fans could suggest songs for Hybrid to cover. The album was originally due for autumn 2011, but ended up being delayed until 30 July 2012. The album was released, both as a standard CD, as well as a 4-disc box set, which contains previously unreleased material. The box set was originally limited to 300 copies, however the number was increased to 500. The deluxe edition saw a digital download release on 7 September 2012, due to public demand. A 5th disc was only made available to the first 40 orders of the deluxe edition, and then later given away.

== Overview ==
The album contains songs taken from Hybrid's previous albums. "Finished Symphony" and "If I Survive" appeared on Hybrid's debut album Wide Angle. The songs were very popular around the time of release and have since been played, and highly favored, by several DJs, as well as appearing in several commercials and TV shows. Most notably, "Finished Symphony" appeared in the British television show Top Gear. "If I Survive" features Julee Cruise on the vocals and still remains one of Hybrid's most well known works. Both tracks have strings provided by the Russian Federal Orchestra. The album was made with the original third member, Lee Mullen, who has since left the group. The deluxe edition features orchestral and instrumental versions of several tracks from "Wide Angle" as well as an unreleased remix of "If I Survive" which featured Charlotte James on vocals.

"True to Form" and "Higher Than A Skyscraper" both appeared on Hybrid's second album Morning Sci-Fi. Both tracks feature Peter Hook, previously a member of New Order, who played on bass for three hours during the sessions. Some of Hook's contributions would later be reconstructed and reused on I Choose Noise. The strings for both tracks were provided by The Hermitage Orchestra, conducted by Andrew Skeet. The version of "True To Form" that appears on this album however is the Acoustic Mix, which combines the Acoustic Version, previously released on the "True To Form" single and the Soundtrack Edit, which is also featured on the deluxe edition. The deluxe edition features an instrumental version of "True To Form", as well as an orchestral version of "Blackout", which originally featured Kirsty Hawkshaw on vocals.

Hybrid's third album I Choose Noise is represented by "Dogstar", "Keep It In The Family" and "Just For Today". "Dogstar" features Perry Farrell on the vocals and the track was later re-recorded as part of Perry Farrell's Satellite Party project, which coincidentally also featured a re-recording of "Dream Stalker", also taken from "I Choose Noise". The entire album was a collaboration with noted film composer Harry Gregson-Williams and fellow film composer Stephen Barton. Previously, Hybrid and Harry Gregson-Williams collaborated on film scores for Man on Fire and Domino. Though Harry Gregson-Williams would only make a small appearance on Hybrid's next album, they would continuously collaborate for several film scores, such as The Chronicles of Narnia: Prince Caspian, Unstoppable, X-Men Origins: Wolverine, and the Total Recall remake. John Graham, who makes music under the name 'Quivver,' also contributed vocals to two songs: "Choke" and "Until Tomorrow," though only the instrumentals make an appearance on disc 3.

Hybrid's fourth album Disappear Here is represented by "Formula of Fear", "Disappear Here" and "Break My Soul." The album was the first to feature a new third member, Charlotte James, who became the new female lead of the group, during the recording of the album. The strings were provided by The City of Prague Philharmonic Orchestra, conducted by Andrew Skeet once again. Like before, the deluxe edition features orchestral editions of several tracks. Some of those tracks feature Tim Hutton, who previously played alongside Ian Brown and The Prodigy and also played instruments on previous Hybrid albums.

The deluxe edition features several items of unreleased and rare material. Among the tracks are several that were purely made for advertising agencies. Among them are the track "Orbit," which was later reworked into "Awesome" as part of "Perry Farrell's Satellite Party". Several of these tracks also made an appearance in TV shows, such as "Mr. Smith", which infamously appeared in Top Gear. A few unreleased remixes are also included, such as the Shifter & Carvel remix of $50 Pistol, which originally appeared on the compilation album Soundsystem 01. The original track was originally a remix of "Humvee Chase," previously made for Déjá Vu, however it was later remade into "Empire" and eventually appeared on the "Disappear Here" album. Several alternate versions of previously released songs were included, such as "Sea Chase" (a soundtrack edit of "Break My Soul"), and "Bound and Gagged" (a rework of "Falling Down"). A surprise inclusion is also the track "Experiment IV," a cover of the Kate Bush song of the same name. The track was recorded during the "Wide Angle" era and was previously only available on a rare promotional CD, named "Views From Wide Angle". Among other songs are "Lights Go Down Knives Come Out" and "Everything Is Brand New." Both songs appeared on Morning-Sci-Fi and I Choose Noise respectively, though they were only accessible by rewinding the CDs from the very first tracks. Initial copies mistakenly excluded "Orbit" (which is presented in its full 5 minute length), prompting Distinct'ive to delay shipping of the box sets.

The fifth disc contains special and previously unreleased versions of tracks, such as "Disappear Here" and "Original Sin", though some of the material has been released in the past. The CD is mixed, which could explain the appearance of tracks, such as "$50 Pistol." It was originally intended to be released with the first 40 orders, with an additional 10 being given away randomly, however Distinct'ive made the fifth disc available to download for people who ordered it, due to continuous shipping delays.

== Track listing ==
=== Regular Edition ===
CD1: Classics
No.	Title	Album	Length
1.	"Finished Symphony"	Wide Angle	9:06
2.	"If I Survive" (featuring Julee Cruise)	Wide Angle	8:27
3.	"True to Form (Acoustic Mix)" (featuring Peter Hook)	Morning Sci-Fi	3:44
4.	"Higher Than a Skyscraper" (featuring Peter Hook)	Morning Sci-Fi	5:46
5.	"Dogstar" (featuring Perry Farrell)	I Choose Noise	7:34
6.	"Keep It in the Family"	I Choose Noise	5:59
7.	"Just for Today"	I Choose Noise	7:43
8.	"Formula of Fear"	Disappear Here	6:50
9.	"Disappear Here"	Disappear Here	5:54
10.	"Break My Soul"	Disappear Here	7:47
11.	"Enjoy the Silence"	Classics	5:50

=== Deluxe Edition ===
CD2: Orchestral
No.	Title	Length
1.	"Opening Credits"	1:16
2.	"If I Survive (Orchestral Version)"	5:08
3.	"Dreaming Your Dreams (Orchestral Version)"	6:06
4.	"Snyper (Orchestral Version)"	3:39
5.	"Finished Symphony (Orchestral Version)"	6:13
6.	"Blackout (Orchestral Version)"	5:51
7.	"Dogstar (Orchestral Version)"	4:32
8.	"Keep It in the Family (Orchestral Version)"	5:08
9.	"I Choose Noise (Orchestral Version)"	2:21
10.	"Falling Down (Orchestral Version)"	2:59
11.	"Can You Hear Me (Orchestral Version)"	4:26
12.	"Disappear Here (Orchestral Version)"	3:20
13.	"Empire (Orchestral Version)"	4:19
14.	"Break My Soul (Orchestral Version)"	7:14
15.	"Numb (Orchestral Version)"	3:04

CD3: Instrumentals + Remixes
No.	Title	Length
1.	"Sinequanon (Instrumental)"	7:59
2.	"True To Form (Instrumental)"	9:17
3.	"Choke (Instrumental)"	6:35
4.	"Until Tomorrow (Instrumental)"	7:43
5.	"Dogstar (Instrumental)"	8:58
6.	"If I Survive (VIP Mix)"	5:49
7.	"Kill City (VIP Mix)"	7:01
8.	"Experiment IV"	5:36
9.	"Dogstar (Trent Cantrelle Remix)"	8:19
10.	"$50 Pistol (Shifter & Carvell Remix)"	6:52

CD4: Cinematic Soundscape
No.	Title	Length
1.	"This Is What It Means (Rewinded Edit)"	1:20
2.	"Everything Is Brand New" (Hidden track on I Choose Noise)	2:25
3.	"In Good We Trust"	3:08
4.	"Higher Than a Skyscraper (Beatless Mix)"	5:20
5.	"Just for Today (Beatless Mix)"	7:05
6.	"Sea Chase"	2:38
7.	"True To Form (Soundtrack Edit)"	2:35
8.	"Orbit"	5:25
9.	"Cascade"	3:33
10.	"Bound and Gagged"	2:14
11.	"The Drop"	2:56
12.	"Menace"	2:18
13.	"Marrakech (Omen Edit)"	1:44
14.	"Lights Go Down Knives Come Out" (Hidden track on Morning Sci-Fi)	6:19
15.	"Last Man Standing (Ambient Mix)"	2:10
16.	"Mr. Smith"	1:19
17.	"Joyrider"	4:12
18.	"Hooligan"	3:55

CD5: White Labels & Acetates
No.	Title	Length
1.	"Dream Stalker (Ambient Reprise)"	1:13
2.	"Enjoy the Silence (Instrumental)"	5:58
3.	"Original Sin (Hybrid Soundsystem Remix)"	7:00
4.	"Can you Hear Me (Classics Re-Edit)"	5:15
5.	"Sleepwalking & True To Form (Future Funk Squad Remix)"	6:57
6.	"Original Sin (Myon & Shane 54 Orchapella)"	1:13
7.	"Higher Than A Skyscraper (Hybrid's Twitch & Sweat Mix)"	8:58
8.	"If I Survive (Live 2003 Studio Mix)"	8:00
9.	"Until Tomorrow (Stefan Anion & Starfire Remix)"	8:57
10.	"Disappear Here (Evacuating London Re-Edit)"	7:49
11.	"$50 Pistol"	8:05

== Trivia ==
- Several of the tracks on the Cinematic Soundscape disc of the box set are from Hybrid's extremely rare ‘’Scores’’ album, released in 2005, but appear here with a different title. "Everything is Brand New" (originally "Inperspective"), "Orbit" (originally "Immaculate"), "Cascade" (originally "Rise Again"), "Menace" (originally "Terminate”), "Mr Smith" (originally "Ultimatum) and “Hooligan” (originally “Rise Again”) all appear on both titles.
- “Sea Chase” (from the “Cinematic Soundscape” disc) is an instrumental version of “Break My Soul”, from Hybrid’s 2010 album Disappear Here
- The orchestral part of “In Good We Trust” (from the “Cinematic Soundscape” disc) is also used in the Hybrid and Kirsty Hawkshaw collaboration “All I Want (Orchestral Mix)".
