= Re Mixed =

Re_Mixed

Compilation album by Hybrid
- Released: 22 October 2007
- Recorded: 2000–07
- Genre: Electronic
- Length: 73:05 (Disc 1); 54:04 (Disc 2)
- Label: Distinctive - DISNCD175
- Producer: Hybrid

Hybrid chronology
Remix and Additional Production by... (2001)	Re_Mixed (2007)	Soundsystem_01 (2008)

Re_Mixed (also known as Hybrid Remixed) is a two disc compilation album released in 2007, featuring remixes of songs by Hybrid. It was released with Distinctive Records on 22 October 2007.

Hybrid had nothing to do with the compilation's release, as it was meant to be their final release on Distinct'ive Records. However, despite being managed by Hope Recordings, Hybrid still released their next few releases on Distinctive.

== Track list ==
Disc 1
No.	Title	Artist	Length
1.	"Until Tomorrow (Stefan Anion & Starfire's 'Surviving Another Day Mix)"	Hybrid featuring John Graham	9:22
2.	"Just For Today (Jerome Sydenham Mix)"	Hybrid featuring Kirsty Hawkshaw	7:31
3.	"I Know (Keenan and Anderson Mix)"	Hybrid featuring Julee Cruise	10:24
4.	"Falling Down (Kosheen Mix)"	Hybrid featuring Judie Tzuke	7:51
5.	"Finished Symphony (Deadmau5 Mix)"	Hybrid	6:44
6.	"If I Survive (Jerome Sydenham Remix)"	Hybrid featuring Julee Cruise	7:12
7.	"Keep It In The Family (Tomboys Quirky Piano-Intro Version)"	Hybrid	6:53
8.	"Higher Than a Skyscraper (The Orb 'Towers of Babel' Mix)"	Hybrid featuring Peter Hook	9:20
9.	"Blackout (The Cinematic Orchestra Mix)"	Hybrid featuring Kirsty Hawkshaw	7:48
Total length:			73:05

Disc 2
No.	Title	Artist	Length
1.	"Finished Symphony (Deadset Play Nifty Mix)"	Hybrid	7:13
2.	"Sleepwalking (Hybrid's Original Mix)"	Hybrid	7:21
3.	"Until Tomorrow (Serge Santiago Mix)"	Hybrid featuring John Graham	9:03
4.	"I Choose Noise (Elite Force Mix)"	Hybrid	7:38
5.	"Last Man Standing (Group Therapy Mix)"	Hybrid	8:12
6.	"Higher Than a Skyscraper (Boy 8-Bit Mix)"	Hybrid featuring Peter Hook	5:02
7.	"Theme From Wide Angle (Hybrid's Rolling Thunder Mix)"	Hybrid	9:35
Total length:			54:04

== Promo Version ==
A promotional version of Hybrid Remixed was released a couple of weeks before the official release. The promo version includes a different track list, including 17 tracks, over 2 discs. It includes a longer version of Cascade (featured on Scores), a different version of Future Funk Squad's remix of "Sleepwalking" and an extra remix of "Finished Symphony" and an instrumental version of Jerome Sydenham's remix of "If I Survive". The tracks are encoded in 128 kbit/s. The sleeve says the tracks are faded, but they aren't; all of the tracks are in their full lengths.

=== Disc 1 ===
1. Hybrid Feat. John Graham - "Until Tomorrow (Stefan Anion & Starfire's 'Surviving Another Day Mix)" - 9:29
2. Hybrid Feat. Kirsty Hawkshaw - "Just For Today (Jerome Sydenham Remix)" - 7:46
3. Hybrid Feat. Judie Tzuke - "Falling Down (Kosheen DJs Mix)" - 8:24
4. Hybrid - "Finished Symphony (Deadmau5 Mix)" - 6:46
5. Hybrid Feat. Julee Cruise - "If I Survive (Jerome Sydenham Vocal Dub)" - 7:17
6. Hybrid - "Keep It In The Family (Tomas Barford Mix)" - 6:55
7. Hybrid - "Finished Symphony (Deadset Play Nifty Mix)" - 7:29
8. Hybrid - "Cascade" - 6:23
9. Hybrid Feat. Kirsty Hawkshaw -"Blackout (The Cinematic Orchestra Mix)" - 7:48

=== Disc 2 ===
1. Hybrid - "Last Man Standing (Group Therapy Remix)" - 8:19
2. Hybrid - "Sleepwalking (Future Funk Squad Remix)" - 5:54
3. Hybrid Feat. Kirsty Hawkshaw - "Just For Today (Jerome Sydenham Dub Mix)" - 6:26
4. Hybrid Feat. John Graham - "Until Tomorrow (Serge Santiago Remix)" - 9:06
5. Hybrid - "I Choose Noise (Elite Force Remix)" - 7:37
6. Hybrid Feat. Peter Hook - "Higher Than A Skyscraper (Boy 8-Bit Remix)" - 5:10
7. Hybrid Feat. Julee Cruise - "If I Survive (Jerome Sydenham Dubstrumental)" - 7:17
8. Hybrid - "Finished Symphony (Deadset Dubtool Mix)" - 6:07

== Trivia ==
- In the writing credits for "Keep It In the Family (Tomboys Quirky Piano-Intro Version)" Harry Gregson-Williams is wrongly named as Gregson and Williams.
- Apparently, the track listing on iTunes is different from the CD. In the iTunes version (as well as the Amazon mp3 download version), "I Know (Keenan and Anderson Mix)" is excluded (for a total of 8 tracks on disc 1) and "Just For Today (Jerome Sydenham Dub)" is included instead (as the 8th and final track on disc 2). Also, on the Amazon mp3 download version, all tracks are listed as being on a single disc.
- "Sleepwalking (Hybrid's Original Mix)" is shorter than the version featured in DJ sets.
