= Disappear Here (Hybrid album) =

2010 studio album by Hybrid

Studio album by Hybrid
- Released: 29 March 2010
- Genre: Electronic, trip hop, breakbeat, electronic rock
- Length: 70:10
- Label: Distinct'ive Breaks
- Producer: Hybrid

Hybrid chronology
I Choose Noise (2006)	Disappear Here (2010)	Light of the Fearless (2018)

Singles from Disappear Here
- 1. "The Formula of Fear" Released: 22 September 2008; 2. "Break My Soul" Released: 8 March 2010; 3. "Can You Hear Me" Released: 24 May 2010; 4. "Disappear Here" Released: 1 November 2010; 5. "Original Sin" Released: 28 March 2011

Professional ratings
Review scores
Source	Rating
BBC	positive
Resident Advisor	3/5 stars
Maxumi Magazine	4/5 stars
PopMatters	8/10
Release Magazine	8/10

Disappear Here is the fourth studio album by British electronic music group Hybrid, released on 28 March 2010 by Distinct'ive Records. A "Widescreen Edition" was released on 22 November, which included alternative and exclusive tracks. It was nominated for "best album" at the Breakspoll 2011 awards.

The title of the album is a reference to Bret Easton Ellis's first novel, Less than Zero.

== History ==
In 2008, the first mention was made of Hybrid's then forthcoming fourth album, which was described as being recorded as a band, then electronically "destroyed". That same year, Hybrid released a compilation Soundsystem_01, which featured remixes of "The Formula of Fear" and "$50 Pistol". After the release of "The Formula of Fear", Charlotte James became a permanent member.

While the album was technically finished in 2008, the band were unsatisfied with the finished results, and as a result picked the best elements, before scrapping the recordings and restarting the production. However the problems continued, as they were having issues finding a direction. It wasn't until the title track "Disappear Here" was finished, that they finally knew what they were going to do. One of the scrapped tracks is believed to be "$50 Pistol" which appeared on the Soundsystem compilation. The track started as a remix of "Humvee Chase", composed by Harry Gregson-Williams for the movie Déjà Vu. Because of licensing issues, the track was reworked into $50 Pistol, and then finally revamped again, to "Empire". Several tracks were also made with John Graham, who sang on their third album I Choose Noise, did not make the cut, though some of them are said to be featured on John Graham's forthcoming second solo album.

In 2009, the album was finally revealed, entitled Disappear Here. The revelation debuted with a video recording of the string arrangements for "Break My Soul".

Guitarist Tim Hutton (who previously worked with Ian Brown and The Prodigy, and played instruments on Morning Sci-Fi & I Choose Noise) was brought in, although his inclusion came late. He is said to have more input on the next album. The string arrangements were made by Andrew Skeet, who also provided strings for Morning Sci-Fi, though Harry Gregson-Williams did write a few string arrangements for the album. The arrangements themselves were composed by Charlotte James and Mike Truman.

The first single, "Break My Soul", was released on 8 March 2010, though the track was given away at the album's mini site. The same month, on the 29th, the album itself was released and was met with favorable reviews. The second single, "Can You Hear Me?", was released on 24 May, with the third single, "Disappear Here", on 1 November and the last single, "Original Sin", expected to be released on 28 March. All singles were accompanied by music videos, directed and edited by Mike Truman, and were made available on their website. "Numb" was supposed to be the fourth single, released during the summer of 2010, but it never saw the light of day. Instead, the title track "Disappear Here" became a single and was released during November 2010. "Original Sin" was the album's final single, which was released on 28 March 2011, a year after the original release of the album.

A special "Widescreen Edition" was released on 22 November, which contains alternative versions of some tracks from the album, as well as some new remixes by Hybrid themselves. The album was re-released yet again on 24 October 2011 as an instrumental only version. Mike mentioned in an interview with Breakbeat Police, that they are already thinking about their next album, and that there will not be another four-year gap, as with "Disappear Here".

== Track listing ==
No.	Title	Writer(s)	Length
1.	"Empire"	Harry Gregson-Williams, Chris Healings, Charlotte James, Mike Truman	6:00
2.	"Can You Hear Me" (featuring Tim Hutton)	Healings, James, Truman	6:26
3.	"Green Shell Suit"	Healings, James, Truman	5:18
4.	"Disappear Here"	Healings, James, Truman	5:56
5.	"Every Word"	Healings, James, Truman	4:54
6.	"Formula of Fear"	James, Truman	7:31
7.	"City Siren (Reprise)"	Healings, James, Truman	1:11
8.	"Salt"	Healings, James, Truman	6:22
9.	"Original Sin"	Healings, James, Truman	6:58
10.	"Take a Fall" (featuring Tim Hutton)	Healings, Tim Hutton, James, Truman	5:18
11.	"Break My Soul"	Healings, James, Truman	7:48
12.	"Numb"	Healings, James, Truman	6:37
Total length:			70:10

=== Widescreen edition ===
No.	Title	Length
1.	"Transmigration I"	1:30
2.	"Empire (Orchestral Version)"	4:20
3.	"Transmigration II"	2:01
4.	"Salt (Acoustic Edit)"	3:51
5.	"Break My Soul (Transmigration Orchestral Mix)"	8:19
6.	"Transmigration III"	1:35
7.	"Every Word (Beatless Mix)"	4:00
8.	"Can You Hear Me (Widescreen Eclectro Mix)"	6:42
9.	"Numb (Hybrid Kill City Sounds Mix 03)"	7:45
10.	"Disappear Here (Hybrid E-Rock Remix)"	5:37
Total length:		115:40

== Reappear Here ==
Reappear Here is a limited vinyl, containing five tracks (four of them so far exclusive to this release), including a new track called "All I See". It was given out as part of a contest to promote the official Disappear Here website and to thank those that were involved in the creation of Disappear Here. This was a 100-copy batch, although as with most pressings some extra copies were made. Currently, there are 109 copies known in existence (108 autographed and numbered, and one unnumbered unsigned copy). 78 copies were given out at the discretion of Hybrid and Distinct'ive Records, and the remaining 30 were prizes as part of a Disappear Here promotion contest that ended on 31 April, 2010. The winners were notified via email on 5 August 2010.

=== Track listing ===
1. "Empire (Soundtrack Edit)" – 4:22
2. "Disappear Here (Armchair Mix)" – 5:45
3. "All I See (Original Mix)" – 5:06
4. "Can You Hear Me (Widescreen Eclectro Mix)" – 6:42
5. "The Formula of Fear (Armchair Mix)" – 7:33

== Personnel ==
=== Hybrid ===
- Mike Truman – keyboards, bass, guitar, programming
- Charlotte James – vocals, guitar, piano, cello
- Chris Healings - engineering, programming

=== Additional musicians ===
- Alex Madge – drums
- Harry Gregson–Williams – composition, additional programming (1)
- The City of Prague Philharmonic Orchestra – orchestral composition (1, 2, 7, 11, 12)
- Tim Hutton – vocals, guitar (2, 10)
- Mike Batt – piano, string arrangements (2)
- Andrew Skeet – conductor of the City of Prague Philharmonic Orchestra

== Charts ==
Chart	Peak position
UK Albums Chart (OCC)	145
UK Dance Albums Chart (OCC)	15
