= Hybrid (British band) =

British electronic music duo

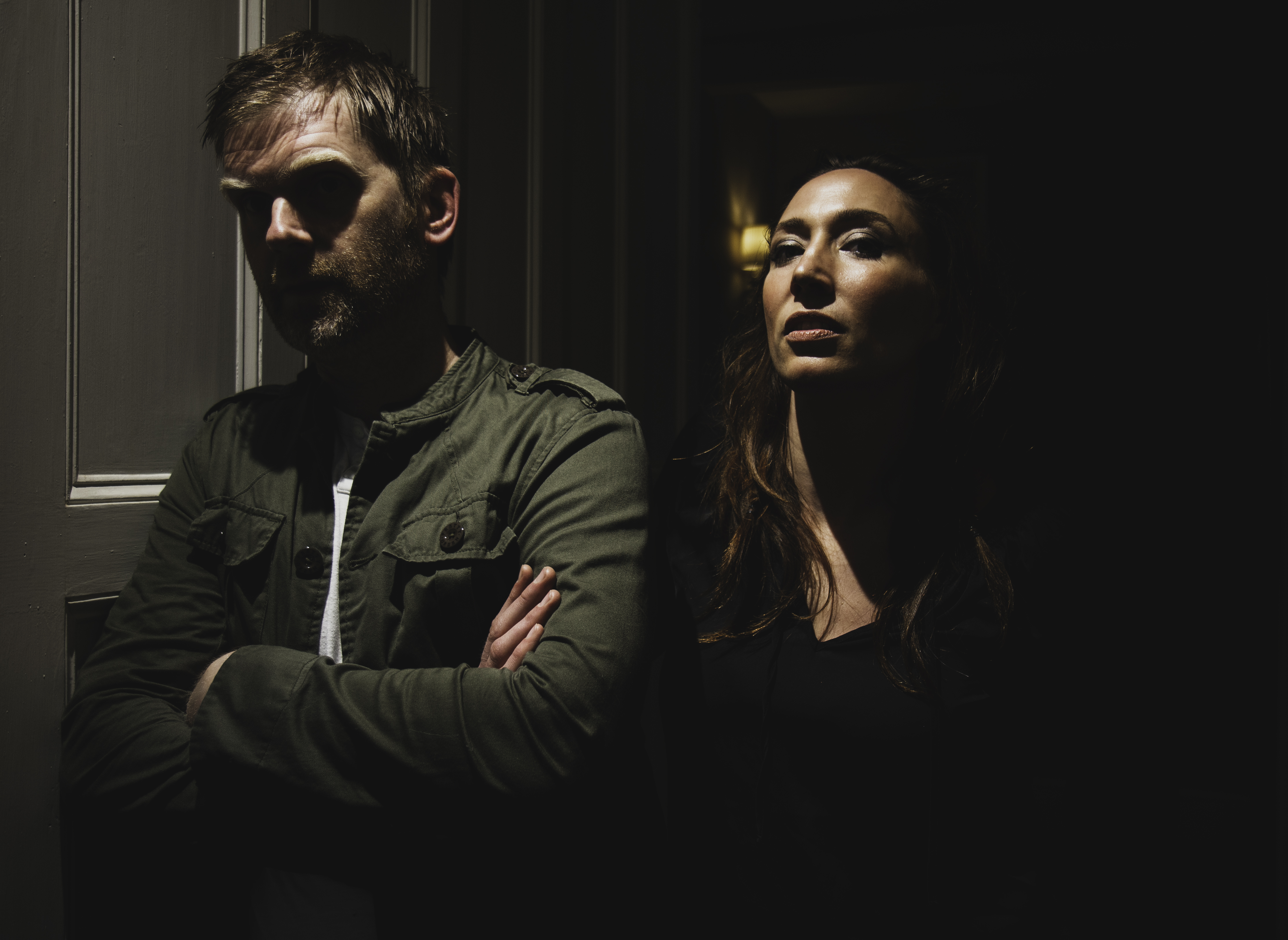
- Hybrid in 2018

Background information
- Origin: Swansea, Wales
- Genres: Electronic; trip hop; breakbeat; progressive house; big beat; film score; electro-classical
- Years active: 1995–present
- Labels: Distinct'ive; Kinetic (former US label); Hope; Kill City
- Members: Mike Truman; Charlotte Truman
- Past members: Chris Healings; Lee Mullin; Adam Taylor
- Website: hybridband.com

Hybrid is a British electronic music duo consisting of Mike and Charlotte Truman. The group was formed in 1995 by Mike Truman, Chris Healings, and Lee Mullin. At the time they were primarily known as a breakbeat collective, although they overlapped considerably with progressive house and trance.

Their 1999 single, "Finished Symphony" was their first charting release; their debut studio album, Wide Angle, was released that year to critical acclaim. Hybrid are considered pioneers of the electronic genre, and are known for their cinematic approach to their production, specifically with the use of orchestral recordings. After Mullin left the group, their second studio album, Morning Sci-Fi (2003), was made with Adam Taylor and featured collaborations with Peter Hook and Kirsty Hawkshaw. In 2006, Truman and Healings released their acclaimed third studio album I Choose Noise.

Charlotte Truman (née James) joined as a vocalist and songwriter shortly afterwards in 2007. Her first recording with Hybrid was "The Formula of Fear" in 2008, the first single from their fourth studio album, Disappear Here (2010).

After a hiatus, founding member Chris Healings left the group in 2015, and their long-awaited fifth studio album, Light of the Fearless, was released in 2018. Truman and Truman then released their sixth studio album ‘Black Halo’ in 2021.

During their career they have also produced over one hundred remixes for about forty artists including U2, Moby, Rob Dougan, R.E.M., and The Future Sound of London. The group was formerly based in Swansea, Wales and have relocated to Worcestershire, England.

== History ==
=== 1999–2000: Wide Angle ===
Hybrid released their debut album, Wide Angle, in 1999 – a combination of progressive house and nu skool breaks with vocals and symphonic textures. They hired the Russian Federal Orchestra for the string sections. Julee Cruise supplied many of the vocals for Wide Angle. The album was produced and written by the duo along with the third original band member, Lee Mullin. The music's cinematic feel and scope have led to comparisons with Massive Attack and Underworld.

The album spawned two singles, "Finished Symphony" and "If I Survive" (featuring Julee Cruise), both of which charted in the UK.

In 2000, Hybrid supported Moby in a live tour through multiple countries. Later that year Hybrid released a double disc edition of Wide Angle titled Wider Angle. The second disc (dubbed "Live Angle") features a live set from the tour that includes previously unreleased tracks such as "Burnin'" and "Kill City".

=== 2002–2004: Morning Sci-Fi ===
Hybrid released their second album, Morning Sci-Fi, in 2003. They added semi-permanent vocalists and guitarists, Adam Taylor and Tim Hutton (both on the album and when performing live) with a guest appearance from New Order alumnus Peter Hook. This album had a generally darker theme than Wide Angle, though still retaining the cinematic undertones for which Hybrid are known. In addition to this, Morning Sci-Fi features a more diverse range of influences than its predecessor — Chris Healings stating in an interview that,

We've been listening to absolutely anything other than dance music. I suppose that is because dance music is so ingrained into what we do naturally. We've been listening to stuff like Doves, Radiohead, Soulwax, New Order, and lots of jangly indie guitar bands and classical music, particularly the work of Arvo Pärt and Alexander Gretchaninov.

Three singles were released from Morning Sci-Fi. These were "True to Form", "Higher Than a Skyscraper" and "I'm Still Awake".

In 2004, Hybrid were invited by noted Hollywood film composer Harry Gregson-Williams to work on the soundtrack for the film Man on Fire. The film marked not only Hybrid's first foray into film music, but also the duo's first collaboration with Harry Gregson-Williams, who also invited them to work on the soundtrack for movies like The Chronicles of Narnia: Prince Caspian, X-Men Origins: Wolverine and Total Recall. This also marked their first collaboration with film director Tony Scott, which continued throughout the remainder of his career, until his death in 2012.

=== 2006–2008: I Choose Noise ===
In April 2006, Hybrid played at the Coachella Valley Music and Arts Festival on 29 April 2006. Later in the same year Hybrid released their third studio album, I Choose Noise. The album featured the return of the epic symphonic sound and grand orchestral scope of Wide Angle. It featured Perry Farrell, John Graham (a fellow music producer, going by the name Quivver), Judie Tzuke and Kirsty Hawkshaw. Harry Gregson-Williams also appeared on the album, composing most of the album's string sections. Film composer Stephen Barton was involved with the production of the album.

The album spawned three 12" singles due to popular demand shortly after its release: "Dogstar / I Choose Noise", "Falling Down / Last Man Standing" and "Dreamstalker / Just For Today". Many of the tracks from the album would later go on to be heavily played by DJs, as well as heavily featured in advertisements. In addition, 2 of the album's tracks "Dogstar" and "Dreamstalker" would later be re-recorded with Perry Farrell for his Satellite Party project. The project also featured another re-recording of his song "Orbit," which was previously unreleased. These recordings were later released on the album Ultra Payloaded which was released in 2007.

On 8 March 2007, Hybrid kicked off their US Spring 2007 Live Tour in support of I Choose Noise. Hybrid was joined by John Graham, Peter DiStefano, and their new female vocalist, Charlotte James. Later that same year Distinct'ive Records released a compilation album: Hybrid Re_Mixed. It consisted of remixes of several compositions by Hybrid, with remixes by various artists including deadmau5, Jerome Sydenham, The Cinematic Orchestra, and The Orb as well as a rare b-side track named "Sleepwalking", originally meant for I Choose Noise. Despite this however, Hybrid had nothing to do with the release, as it was meant to be their last release with Distinct'ive. However, despite being managed by Hope Recordings, Hybrid still released their next few releases with Distinct’ive.

In 2007, Hybrid:

- composed their first original soundtrack for the film Catacombs. However, Hybrid's contributions were never released, despite heavy fan demand
- played in the Lounge and Dance Village at Glastonbury Festival

2008 saw the release of Soundsystem 01. The album is a double-disc mix collection with the first CD being based around actual film scores fused with ambient electronica, and the second containing more upfront, club-oriented music represented by remixes of music by the likes of Sasha, Quivver and Elite Force. Later that same year, Hybrid released a new single, entitled "The Formula of Fear", which featured Charlotte James on as songwriter, vocalist and guitarist. Hybrid also contributed an original track "Komuru", to the Survival International charity album, Songs for Survival.

=== 2009–2011: Disappear Here ===
Besides collaborating with Harry Gregson-Williams 2009 saw Hybrid focusing on the production of their fourth album. The album was originally finished in 2008, however the group described the album as indie rock and as a result, weren't satisfied with the album, which led them to restart the production completely. After several months of silence, their fourth album Disappear Here was finally finished and released on 29 March 2010. The album was made with Andrew Skeet and the City of Prague Philharmonic Orchestra at Smecky Music Studios. A video recording of the track from the forthcoming album, entitled "Break My Soul", was also released which was filmed and edited by the band. Disappear Here spawned several singles, and also rose to #2 at the iTunes electronic charts. The album was re-released in the same year, entitled Disappear Here: Widescreen Edition, which contained special edits, remixes and orchestral versions.

2010 also saw:

- more collaborations with Harry Gregson-Williams. The duo helped finish the score for Prince of Persia: The Sands of Time, and yet another Tony Scott production: Unstoppable. This would prove to be the last collaboration with Tony Scott, with the director's death in 2012.
- Hybrid play at Glastonbury Festival once more.

On 15 March 2011, Hybrid released the song "Blind Side" for free, as promotion for the single, which itself was officially released on 22 August 2011. The single was their first release for their new label Kill City Records. Beyond this, Hybrid spent most of 2011 focusing on film score work. The group submitted two original tracks for the film Fast Five. They also helped finish the score for Cowboys & Aliens and were working on the original soundtrack for the video game Tom Clancy's Ghost Recon: Future Soldier, which was released in May 2012.

=== 2012–2017: Classics and Healings' departure ===
August 2012 saw the release of Classics out on Distinctive Records. The album was a greatest hits compilation, compiling the biggest hits from Hybrid's career. The album was released in a standard one disc edition, as well as a deluxe edition, consisting of 4 discs. The deluxe edition featured many alternative mixes and orchestral versions, as well as unreleased material, including much of the music that was made for advertisement agencies.

In 2013, Hybrid finished working on a few soundtracks. One was for the video game Driveclub, where the band composed all of the music in addition to creating a new single for the game, entitled: "Be Here Now". They also finished work on a direct-to-video film: Dead in Tombstone. Their work (unlike for the previous film, Catacombs) was released by Back Lot Music on 15 October 2013. In 2014, the band finished a score for the science fiction film Vice, which was released on 16 January 2015.

In 2014, Hybrid released a song called "Polaris" on SoundCloud.

In 2016, Hybrid wrote the score for Jim Gillespie's Take Down. Later that year, the band announced on Facebook that Healings had left the group in the summer of 2015.

In 2017, Hybrid wrote the score for John Stephenson's Interlude in Prague, for which Charlotte James was the music producer. The soundtrack album was released by Kill City Records on 29 May 2017.

=== 2018–2019: Light of the Fearless ===
On 11 May 2018, Hybrid claimed that their then-upcoming album had been completed.

On 22 June 2018, Hybrid announced their fifth studio album, Light of the Fearless. Its lead single, "Light Up", was released on 13 July 2018 alongside remixes from Loadstar and Matt Lange. The album was released on digital download and streaming services on 27 July 2018.

On 21 July 2018, Hybrid released a trailer for the album, which features recording sessions with the City of Prague Philharmonic Orchestra.

On 21 February 2019, Hybrid released a short film to accompany their single "Hold Your Breath". The film featured James Purefoy alongside Hybrid's Mike and Charlotte Truman in starring roles. James Purefoy had previously worked with Hybrid on Interlude in Prague.

=== 2021: Black Halo ===
On 26 March 2021, the duo released a new single, "Flashpoint". Two more singles, "Nails" and "Sky Full of Diamonds", were released afterwards. Their sixth album, Black Halo, was announced on 14 June 2021 and was released on 9 July.

== Band members ==
=== Current members ===
- Mike Truman – producer, bass, guitar, keyboards, programming, engineer, mixing (1995–present)
- Charlotte Truman (née James) – vocals, songwriter, guitar, piano, cello, viola, orchestral composer, programming (2007–present)

=== Former members ===
- Chris Healings – sound design, keyboards, programming, (1995–2015)
- Lee Mullin – drums, programming, (1995–2000)
- Adam Taylor – vocals, guitar (2002–03)

=== Additional musicians ===
- Harry Gregson-Williams – producer, conductor, orchestration
- Peter Hook – bass
- Stephen Barton – piano, orchestration, assistant
- Alex Madge – drums
- Jamie Griffiths – turntabalism, scratching
- Tim Hutton – vocals, bass, guitar, drums

=== Live members (2018) ===
- Stu Morgan – guitar, bass & vocals
- Simon Hanson – drums, programming

== Discography ==
Studio albums

- Wide Angle (1999)
- Morning Sci-Fi (2003)
- I Choose Noise (2006)
- Disappear Here (2010)
- Light of the Fearless (2018)
- Black Halo (2021)

== Filmography ==
=== Film ===
Year	Title	Director	Notes
2004	Man on Fire	Tony Scott	Music arranger and programmer
2005	Domino	Tony Scott	Additional music
2006	Déjà Vu	Tony Scott	Music programmer
2007	Catacombs	Tomm Coker and David Elliot	Composer
2008	The Chronicles of Narnia: Prince Caspian	Andrew Adamson	Music programmer
2009	X-Men Origins: Wolverine	Gavin Hood	Additional music and programmer
2009	The Taking of Pelham 123	Tony Scott	Additional music and programmer
2010	Prince of Persia: The Sands of Time	Mike Newell	Music programmer
2010	Unstoppable	Tony Scott	Additional music and programmer
2011	Fast Five	Justin Lin	Additional music
2011	Cowboys & Aliens	Jon Favreau	Music programmer
2012	Total Recall	Len Wiseman	Additional music
2013	Exile to Babylon	Domagoj Mazuran	
2013	Dead in Tombstone	Roel Reiné	
2014	The Equalizer	Antoine Fuqua	Additional music and programmer
2014	Hercules	Brett Ratner	Additional arrangements and programmer
2015	Blackhat	Michael Mann	Additional music and programmer
2015	Vice	Brian A. Miller	
2016	Billionaire Ransom	Jim Gillespie	
2017	Interlude in Prague	John Stephenson	
2017	Dead Again in Tombstone	Roel Reiné	
2024	Get Away	Steffen Haars	

=== Theatre ===
Year	Title	Notes
2012	Little Dogs	
2015	Othello (by Frantic Assembly)	

=== Video games ===
Year	Title	Notes
2001	Lotus Challenge	
2005	In the Groove 2	
2005	Juiced	
2012	Ghost Recon: Future Soldier	
2014	Driveclub	
2026	Arknights: Endfield	

== Use of Hybrid's music ==
Hybrid's extensive music for TV, film and games can be found at their dedicated scoring website, www.hybridscores.com.

Over the years, Hybrid's studio material from their first three albums and their singles, have been heavily used for television, film and video games. Hybrid composed the soundtrack for the 2007 film Catacombs, and have also helped Harry Gregson-Williams score Man on Fire, Déjà Vu, and X-Men Origins: Wolverine.

Other notable uses includes:

- "Know Your Enemy", "Out of the Dark", and "Visible Noise" were featured in the game In the Groove 2, released on 18 June 2005.
- In November 2006, "All I Want" was featured in an advertisement for the Channel 4 show Unanimous.
- The music of Hybrid has been featured several times in the motoring TV show Top Gear. "Finished Symphony" was used when Jeremy Clarkson, in a Bugatti Veyron, raced James May and Richard Hammond, in a light aircraft, across Europe (season 7, episode 5), whilst "Formula of Fear" was featured in season 14, in the Maserati/Porsche/Aston Martin segment. "Mr. Smith" (aka "Ultimatum") was used in the fourth episode of season 5 and in the first episode of season 7, when Clarkson reviews the Aston Martin V8 Vantage on the Isle of Man, and in the tenth episode of season 6, "Know Your Enemy" was played in the BMW 5 Series Diesel vs. Petrol review. "Sea Chase" was used in the first episode of season 20, in which Jeremy (in a Toyota Corolla) and James (on an America's Cup yacht) conduct a race in New Zealand. "Just for Today" was used in the Porsche Boxster S review in season 8, episode 4.
- "Finished Symphony" was featured in the games SSX, SSX Tricky, and Juiced.
- "Higher Than a Skyscraper" is featured in the Xbox 360 game Crackdown.
- "I Know" was used as sample in the song "Desnudame", from Achillea's second album Amadas Estrellas.
- "I Choose Noise" was featured in an advertisement for the BBC's Doctor Who spin-off series Torchwood.
- "Choke" was used in a game trailer for Quantum Theory.
- "Cascade", from Scores, was used as the bed for a Sky+ HD advertisement.
- "Dogstar" from I Choose Noise was used by the BBC as title music for their coverage of the 2009 World Athletics Championships and 2010 European Athletics Championships.
- "Finished Symphony" was used by the BBC for their Boxing coverage.
- "Kid 2000" was one of the tunes for the film Kevin and Perry Go Large.
- "We Are in Control" was used in Poland by Gellwe for their "Fitella" muesli advertisement, and has also been used in Top Gear a couple of times.
- "If I Survive" was used in the PlayStation 2 game Kinetica.
- Five songs by Hybrid were used in the film Man on Fire.
- Parts of "We Are in Control" were used as background music for Disorderly Conduct: Video on Patrol.
- "I Know" was used in Armin van Buuren's six-hour-long set, Armin Only.
- Hybrid produced a track called "Komoru" for BBC's Tribe LP. It was released in September 2008 by Polydor Records.
- Elements of "Zulu" were used as samples in the Metal Gear Solid 4: Guns of the Patriots soundtrack. The soundtrack was partly composed by Harry Gregson-Williams.
- "Gravastar" and "Celebrity Science" were used in the soundtrack for F1 Challenge '99-'02.
- The song "Choke" was used for the trailer for The Spirit; "Keep it in the Family" was used in a later trailer for the same film.
- "Formula of Fear (Hybrid's Matrix Dub)" was featured on the soundtrack for Need for Speed: Undercover.
- "We Are in Control" has been used on the Australian version of Big Brother.
- "We Are in Control" and "Know Your Enemy" can be heard in the show Alias on episode 4, "The Road Home".
- "I Know" and "If I Survive" have been used in the show CSI: NY.
- Ford and Lamborghini used the song "Ultimatum" as the soundtrack for their website exclusive video featuring the Ford Focus ST and Lamborghini Murcielago LP640.
- Several songs from Hybrid's unreleased album of scores have been used in taped segments on the ABC show Dancing with the Stars.
- "Just for Today" was used as the backing music for the 'Best in Britain' video clip on Alfa Romeo's website for the Prodrive-tuned Brera S coupe, which featured the car driving around Millbrook Proving Ground in Bedfordshire, UK.
- Early episodes of America's Next Top Model regularly used tracks from Morning Sci-Fi.
- A sample from "Last Man Standing" was used in the Crysis 2 multiplayer reveal trailer.
- "I Choose Noise" was used in advertisement for the 2006 Channel 4 police drama Low Winter Sun.
- Several tracks from I Choose Noise were included in the video game Saints Row: The Third. The game also included several unreleased tracks, available only for advertising agencies.
- "Light Up" and "Superpower" (from Light of the Fearless) were included as opening tracks on Strictly Come Dancing in separate episodes in 2018.
