= Light of the Fearless =

2018 studio album by Hybrid

Studio album by Hybrid
- Released: 27 July 2018
- Recorded: 2015–18
- Length: 55:30
- Label: Distinctive Records
- Producer: Hybrid

Hybrid chronology
Disappear Here (2010)	Light of the Fearless (2018)	Black Halo (2021)

Singles from Light of the Fearless
- 1. "Light Up" Released: 13 July 2018; 2. "Hold Your Breath" Released: 21 February 2019; 3. "Superpower" Released: 20 December 2019

Light of the Fearless is the fifth studio album by British electronica group Hybrid, released on 27 July 2018 by Distinctive Records. It is Hybrid's first album without keyboardist Chris Healings, following his departure from the band in 2015.

Its lead single, "Light Up", was released on 13 July 2018 alongside remixes from Loadstar and Matt Lange.

The second single from the album, "Hold Your Breath", was released on 21 February 2019, accompanied by a short film which stars Altered Carbon's James Purefoy and band members Mike and Charlotte.

== Background ==
Light of the Fearless was made in conjunction with various movies that Hybrid was scoring, such as Vice, Billionaire Ransom and Interlude in Prague. The album was made with the help of the City of Prague Philharmonic Orchestra.

The album was inspired by events in the lives of Mike and Charlotte Truman, such as the death of Charlotte's mother in 2012, along with protests such as the March for Our Lives 2018 and 2017 Women's March, although the album is not political. The album also features a cover of Tom Petty's song "I Won't Back Down".

== Track listing ==
No.	Title	Writer(s)	Length
1.	"We Are Fearless"	Mike Truman, Charlotte Truman	6:19
2.	"Hold Your Breath"	M. Truman, C. Truman	4:41
3.	"Superpower"	M. Truman, C. Truman	4:27
4.	"Down to the Wire"	M. Truman, C. Truman	5:37
5.	"Usual Rules"	M. Truman, C. Truman	4:18
6.	"Light Up"	M. Truman, C. Truman	6:07
7.	"Beauty Queen"	M. Truman, C. Truman	4:51
8.	"Shaking"	M. Truman, C. Truman	4:39
9.	"Long Time Coming"	M. Truman, C. Truman	4:34
10.	"I Won't Back Down"	M. Truman, C. Truman, Tom Petty, Jeff Lynne	7:57
Total length:			55:30

Instrumental
No.	Title	Length
1.	"We Are Fearless (Instrumental)"	6:19
2.	"Hold Your Breath (Instrumental)"	4:47
3.	"Superpower (Instrumental)"	4:31
4.	"Down to the Wire (Instrumental)"	5:42
5.	"Usual Rules (Instrumental)"	4:21
6.	"Light Up (Instrumental)"	6:13
7.	"Beauty Queen (Instrumental)"	4:50
8.	"Shaking (Instrumental)"	4:44
9.	"Long Time Coming (Instrumental)"	4:36
10.	"I Won't Back Down (Instrumental)"	7:57

Orchestral
No.	Title	Length
1.	"Long Time Coming (Orchestral)"	4:12
2.	"Down to the Wire (Orchestral)"	2:37
3.	"Shaking (Orchestral)"	3:02
4.	"Shaking (Orchestral)"	1:53
5.	"Usual Rules (Orchestral)"	4:21
6.	"Superpower (Orchestral)"	1:52
7.	"Light Up (Orchestral)"	2:29
8.	"I Won't Back Down (Rehearsal)"	2:15
9.	"Beauty Queen (Orchestral)"	4:07

Shadow of the Fearless
No.	Title	Length
1.	"Polaris (Stargazer Mix)"	5:08
2.	"The Decision Mirror"	4:10
3.	"Voice of the Mountain"	4:43
4.	"Absinthe Tea Party"	4:02
5.	"Down to the Wire (Armchair Mix)"	5:44
6.	"Light Up (Armchair Mix)"	6:09
7.	"Sunlight Through Broken Windows"	5:23
8.	"Superpower (Don't Funk It Up Mix)"	5:12
9.	"Long Time Coming (Jack Delacroix Remix)"	4:57
10.	"System Crash"	3:02

"Light Up"
No.	Title	Length
1.	"Light Up (Video Edit)"	4:29
2.	"Light Up (Original Mix)"	6:09
3.	"Light Up (Loadstar Remix)"	4:15
4.	"Light Up (Loadstar Instrumental)"	4:15
5.	"Light Up (Matt Lange Remix)"	5:27

== Charts ==
Chart (2018)	Peak position
UK Dance Albums (Official Charts Company)	7
