= I Choose Noise =

Studio album by Hybrid
- Released: 4 September 2006
- Recorded: 2004–06
- Genre: Electronic, trip hop, breakbeat
- Length: 67:52
- Label: Distinct'ive Breaks
- Producer: Hybrid

Hybrid chronology
Morning Sci-Fi (2003)	I Choose Noise (2006)	Disappear Here (2010)

Singles from I Choose Noise
- 1. "Dogstar" Released: 20 November 2006; 2. "Falling Down" Released: 4 December 2006; 3. "Dream Stalker" Released: 18 December 2006

Professional ratings
Review scores
Source	Rating
Release Magazine	9/10
iBeats	9/10
About.com	3.5/5 stars
Tiny Mix Tapes	4/5 stars
Resident Advisor	4/5 stars

I Choose Noise is the third studio album by British electronic music group Hybrid, released on 4 September 2006 by Distinct'ive Records. The album included recorded symphonic sequences by the Seattle Session Orchestra, and was produced in collaboration with composer Harry Gregson-Williams.

== Background ==
The album was released in the UK on 4 September 2006 and in the United States on 10 October 2006. Although a bonus disc featuring Hybrid's live show at God's Global Gathering was intended to be included, it was omitted due to time constraints and may be released separately. Hybrid's track "Sleepwalking" was also originally intended for I Choose Noise, but was omitted because it was felt not to fit into the album. The track did not become available until four years after it was originally produced, with the release of the album Re_Mixed.

I Choose Noise is the only studio album by Hybrid not to be released on vinyl. However, due to popular demand, several tracks from the album were also released on 12" vinyl singles. The three releases were "Dogstar", "Falling Down", and "Dream Stalker". By 15 December 2006, all three were available through the Distinct'ive Records website.

== Track listing ==
No.	Title	Writer(s)	Length
0.	"Everything Is Brand New" (hidden track; accessible by rewinding from "Secret Circles")	Harry Gregson-Williams, Chris Healings, Michael Truman	3:04
1.	"Secret Circles"	Gregson-Williams, Healings, Truman	0:53
2.	"Dogstar" (featuring Perry Farrell)	Farrell, Healings, Truman	8:24
3.	"I Choose Noise"	Healings, Truman	5:29
4.	"Falling Down" (featuring Judie Tzuke)	Gregson-Williams, Truman, Tzuke	6:52
5.	"Last Man Standing"	Healings, Tillman, Truman	8:08
6.	"Hooligan Spirit"	Healings, Truman	4:34
7.	"Choke" (featuring John Graham)	Graham, Truman	6:52
8.	"Keep It in the Family"	Gregson-Williams, Truman	6:22
9.	"Until Tomorrow" (featuring John Graham)	Armando DiStéfano, Graham, Greenwood, Truman	6:46
10.	"Dream Stalker"	Healings, Truman	6:28
11.	"Just for Today" (featuring Kirsty Hawkshaw)	Gregson-Williams, Hawkshaw, Healings, Truman	8:10
Total length:			67:52

== Remixes ==
- "Dogstar" was remixed by Satellite Party under the name "Wish Upon a Dogstar".
- "Dream Stalker" was remixed by Satellite Party. The track is called "Kinky".
- "Last Man Standing" & "Until Tomorrow" were remixed and released under the name Last Man Standing / Until Tomorrow Remixes.
- "I Choose Noise" was remixed by Elite Force and has been released (along with a remix of "Sleepwalking") under the name I Choose Noise / Sleepwalking Remixes.

== Personnel ==
- Stephen Barton – piano, orchestration, assistant
- Toby Chu – assistante engineer
- Peter DiStefano – guitars
- Perry Farrell – vocals, vocal effect
- Meri Gavin – assistant engineer
- John D. Graham – vocals
- Tom Greenwood – electric guitar
- Harry Gregson-Williams – producer, conductor, orchestration
- Kirsty Hawkshaw – vocals
- Chris Healings – keyboards, programming, engineer, mixing
- Peter Hook – bass
- Tim Hutton – bass, drums
- Hybrid – producer
- Simon James – contractor
- Costa Kotselas – assistant engineer
- Kory Kruckenberg – digital editing
- Mal Luker – engineer
- Gretchen O`Neal – production supervisor
- Robert Puff – music copyist
- David Sabee – contractor
- Jon Schluckebier – stage manager
- Tony Scott – speech
- Adam Taylor – acoustic guitar
- Martin Tillman – electric cello
- Mike Truman – guitar, keyboards, programming, engineer, mixing
- Judie Tzuke – vocals

== Trivia ==
- I Choose Noise was misprinted in the CD liner notes as "I Chose Noise".
- "Choke" and "Keep It in the Family" were featured in the trailers for the 2008 film The Spirit.
- "Dream Stalker" features voiceover from the audio commentary for Domino by director Tony Scott, for whom Hybrid have co-produced three film soundtracks.
- "Just for Today" was featured as the opening theme of The Frantic Assembly's production of Othello.
  - "Just for Today" is also used in the 2011 video game Saint's Row: The Third where it plays during the freefalling segment of the mission Air Steelport.
- "Everything is Brand New" was included as a digital download bonus track.
- Several tracks from I Choose Noise were previewed on the rare Scores album, released a year previously. "Dream Stalker" and "Keep it in the Family" appear on both albums, but are titled differently on Scores (as "Outta Time" and "What Lies Beneath" respectively). Elements of "Dogstar" are also used in the Scores track, "Hearts Desire", which was later retitled "Hooligan" and appears on the Cinematic Soundscape disc of the Classics box set.

== Charts ==
Chart	Peak position
UK Albums Chart (OCC)	117
UK Dance Albums Chart (OCC)	7
