= Rick Strom =

Rick Strom may refer to:

- Rick Strom (music producer), American music producer
- Rick Strom (American football) (born 1965), American football quarterback
