= Adam Fielding =

Adam Fielding may refer to:

- Adam Fielding (musician)
- Adam Fielding (actor)
