= My Secret Life (Julee Cruise album) =

Studio album by Julee Cruise
- Released: March 1, 2011
- Genres: Downtempo; dream pop
- Label: Purley Sounds LLC
- Producer: DJ Dmitry

Julee Cruise chronology
The Art of Being a Girl (2002)	My Secret Life (2011)

My Secret Life is the fourth and final album by Julee Cruise and was released in 2011. The album was produced by DJ Dmitry of Deee-lite, and was the last album released by Cruise before her death in 2022.

== Track listing ==
1. "My Secret Life"
2. "I'm Crazy"
3. "I Luv U 2 Death"
4. "A Fatal Beating"
5. "Your Girl"
6. "Mine"
7. "Orbiting Planet Fear"
8. "Season of the Witch"
9. "Cloudy Days"
10. "Bright Shiny Way"
11. "Only Us"
12. "I'm Wishing"
13. "The Bitter Suite" (iTunes Bonus Track)
