= The Voice of Love (album) =

Studio album by Julee Cruise
- Released: October 12, 1993
- Recorded: Excalibur Studios, Cherokee Recording, Saturn Sound
- Length: 51:47
- Label: Warner Bros.
- Producer: David Lynch

Julee Cruise chronology
Floating into the Night (1989)	The Voice of Love (1993)	The Art of Being a Girl (2002)

The Voice of Love is the second album by American dream pop singer Julee Cruise. It was released on October 12, 1993.

== Background and content ==
Some of the songs on the album were taken from previous David Lynch productions. "Up in Flames" had previously appeared on Lynch's 1990 musical play Industrial Symphony No. 1; "Questions in a World of Blue", an instrumental version of "She Would Die for Love", and an instrumental version of "The Voice of Love" were all included in the film Twin Peaks: Fire Walk with Me, which was also directed by David Lynch and in which Cruise makes a brief appearance. An instrumental version of "Kool Kat Walk" appeared in Lynch's 1990 film Wild at Heart.

== Critical reception ==
Professional ratings
Review scores
Source	Rating
AllMusic	4.5/5 stars
Chicago Tribune	3/4 stars
NME	3/10
Pitchfork	7.7/10
Uncut	8/10
Vox	7/10

In Spin, Ann Powers described The Voice of Love as an exercise in "mood" over "personality" and wrote, "A few moments on The Voice of Love aim for innovation, but generally, Cruise and her shapers remain true to their original plan: to make truly haunting music." Retrospectively, AllMusic critic Ned Raggett summarized it as "a continuation more than anything else" of Cruise's debut album Floating into the Night, finding that it "stands alone just fine" as "another mysterious, dreamy float through a hazy post-'50s/post-punk mood zone."

== Track listing ==
All lyrics are written by David Lynch, except where noted; all music is composed by Angelo Badalamenti, except where noted.

No.	Title	Writer(s)	Length
1.	"This Is Our Night"		4:06
2.	"The Space for Love"		3:24
3.	"Movin' in on You"		4:04
4.	"Friends for Life"		4:44
5.	"Up in Flames"		4:39
6.	"Kool Kat Walk"		6:23
7.	"Until the End of the World"		5:33
8.	"She Would Die for Love"		6:06
9.	"In My Other World"	Cruise, Louis Tucci	4:47
10.	"Questions in a World of Blue"		4:47
11.	"The Voice of Love"		3:14

== Personnel ==
- Angelo Badalamenti – arrangements, conduction, synthesizer, piano, production
- David Lynch – lyrics, artwork, percussion, production
- Julee Cruise – vocals
- Vincent Bell – guitar
- Gerry Brown – drums
- Reggie Hamilton – bass guitar
- Jim Hynes – trumpet
- Nick Kirgo – guitar
- Kinny Landrum – synthesizer
- Sam Merendino – drums
- Art Pohlemus – mixing (tracks 5 and 10)
- Tom Ranier – keyboards
- Albert Regni – tenor saxophone
- Grady Tate – drums
- Buster Williams – acoustic bass guitar

Technical

- John Karpowich – mixing (tracks 1 to 4, 6 to 9, 11)
- Stephen Marcussen – mastering
- E. J. Carr – sleeve photography
- Tom Recchion – sleeve artwork
