= Adam Fielding (musician) =

- Origin: United Kingdom
- Occupation: Music producer
- Years active: 1995–present
- Labels: Distinctive Records; Lost Language solarSwarm
- Website: http://www.adamfielding.com

Adam Fielding is a UK-based electronic music producer and composer.

== History ==
Starting in 1995, Fielding began writing music using a combination of an Atari STe computer running Protracker software. Although this started out as more of a hobby to support his interest in games programming, his interest in music led him to start experimenting further with tracker music in 1997/98. His developing interest in music led to him studying a BSc in music production at the University of Huddersfield in 2005. While studying at university, he began to incorporate more live instrumentation into his music. In 2008 he released his debut LP (Distant Activity) independently.

Following this independent release, Fielding released a free online single in 2009 (From Out Of Nowhere), followed by another single in 2010 (Lost In Silence) through the social network record label solarSwarm.

Fielding released a second album in 2010 (Lightfields). Following the release of Lightfields, both Distant Activity and Lightfields were signed to and re-distributed through Distinctive Records. In 2012 he released an album of selected ambient works (And All Is As It Should Be) through Lost Language Recordings, featuring original tracks and re-workings of existing material in a more cinematic style. This was followed by an album of instrumental tracks written for film, TV, and games (Chase The Light), which was released in 2012 through FiXT.

Fielding re-united with Distinctive Records in 2013 to release the full-length album Icarus, which was preceded by a single of the same name featuring The City of Prague Philharmonic Orchestra.

== Discography ==
- The Dawn EP - 2008
- Distant Activity - 2008
- From Out of Nowhere - 2009
- Lost In Silence - 2010
- Lightfields - 2010
- Chase The Light - 2012
- And All Is As It Should Be - 2012
- Icarus - 2013
- Pieces - 2014
- AdFi (as AdFi) - 2014
- Obscurer - 2015
- The Broken Divide - 2016
- Mesmera - 2018
