= Rick Strom (music producer) =

American music producer

- Origin: Los Angeles, United States
- Genres: IDM, Drum and Bass, Acid, Ambient, Techno
- Years active: 2001–present
- Labels: Glowdot Productions also releases on Water Music Records and Vivendi Universal
- Members: Rick Strom, Shanna Dawn, Julee Cruise, Yelena Kashtuyeva

Rick Strom is a Los Angeles, California based electronic music producer. Rick Strom was, shortly, signed to the Water Music Records/Universal label in 2001, but his album Flow was subsequently released as a free MP3 release via the Glowdot label and Soulseek Records. Notable collaborations include Julee Cruise (David Lynch/Twin Peaks) and Nastassja Kinski (daughter of Klaus Kinski).

Strom is probably best known for his more mainstream collaborations with other artists, as his solo work is fairly experimental. Notable collaborations and remixes have been done for and with Nastassja Kinski, Julee Cruise, Chuck D (of Public Enemy), and others.

== Discography ==
=== Albums ===
- Population 1 (2002)
- Flow (2003)

=== Appears On ===
- "N" on Chilled Grooves (2003)
- "Je Taime" on I Love Paris: The Fashion Chillout Lounge Collection (2003)
- "Maybe I Should" on Ultimate Chill Out (2003)
- "Cold" on ID Models - Fashion Lounge (2003)
- "Moments in Love" on Purified: The Liquid Lounge Chillout Series Vol. 1 (2003)
- "Close to the Limit" on This Is Dance! (2003)
- "Population 1" on Cafe Electronica (2003)
- "Maybe I Should" on Chilled Sirens (import) (2004)
- 'Maybe I Should' on Global Chilled Volume 1 (2003)
- "Requiem" on Global Chilled Volume 2 (2003)
- "Maybe I Should" on Velvet Lounge (DVD) (2003)

=== DJ mixes ===
- Samedi (2003)
- Excursions (2003)
- Chilled Grooves (2003)

== Guest produced on ==
- Julee Cruise The Art of Being a Girl (2003)
- Nastassja Kinski Close to the Limit
