= True to Form =

"True To Form"

Single by Hybrid

from the album Morning Sci-Fi
- Released: 15 September 2003; 21 February 2005 (digital release)
- Label: Distinct'ive Breaks
- Songwriter(s): Mike Truman, Chris Healings, Adam Taylor, Peter Hook
- Producer(s): Hybrid

Hybrid singles chronology
"Kid 2000" (2000)	"True To Form" (2003)	"Higher Than A Skyscraper" (2004)

"True To Form" is a song by British electronic music band Hybrid featuring Peter Hook, released as the first single from their second studio album Morning Sci-Fi on 15 September 2003. This song was made in collaboration with Hook, with vocals performed by Adam Taylor.

== Track listings ==
1. Radio Edit – 3:51
2. Hybrid Club Mix – 5:30
3. Creamer & K Club Mix – 11:17

=== Versions ===
"True To Form" (versions), were also released on Distinct'ive Records, with a different track list.

1. Club Edit – 5:33
2. Acoustic Version – 2:42
3. Full Length – 9:11

=== Digital version ===
On iTunes 5 tracks where included in the single. The songs were released on iTunes on February 23, 2005.

1. Radio Edit – 3:55
2. Club Edit – 5:33
3. Acoustic Version – 2:42
4. Full Length Version – 9:11
5. John Creamer & Stephane K Club Mix – 11:17 (album only)

== Charts ==
Chart	Peak position
UK Singles Chart (OCC)	59
UK Dance Chart (OCC)	5

== Trivia ==
- With each remix of True To Form, none of them include Peter Hook's basslines. In July 2002. Peter told the band: "None of these bloody remixers ever use my bass lines. I put in all this time and effort yet they use Bernard's vocals but they don't even use my bass."
- An unreleased mix can be heard at Hybrid's website and the bonus DVD bundled with the CD release of Morning Sci-Fi.
