= Soundsystem 01 =

Soundsystem_01

Remix album by Hybrid
- Released: (United Kingdom) 14 July 2008 (United States) 5 August 2008
- Recorded: 2007–08
- Genres: Nu skool breaks, progressive house
- Length: 55:55 (Disc 1); 64:41 (Disc 2)
- Labels: Hope Recordings, Nettwerk (USA)
- Producer: Hybrid

Hybrid chronology
Re_Mixed (2007)	Soundsystem_01 (2008)	Classics (2012)

Soundsystem_01 is Hybrid's first mix album with Hope Recordings. It was released on 14 July 2008 through Hope Recordings in the UK and then in the United States on 5 August 2008 through Nettwerk. The album also contains remixes of music from artists like Trentemøller, Massive Attack and Andy Page as well as music by movie composers Harry Gregson-Williams and John Murphy.

== Track listing ==
Disc 1
No.	Title	Artist	Length
1.	"Desert Chase"	Harry Gregson-Williams	2:41
2.	"Gamma"	Trentemøller & Buda	0:59
3.	"Sweet Is Good"	Massive Attack	1:37
4.	"Parks on Fire"	Trifonic	5:56
5.	"6AM Sedna"	Lostep	1:10
6.	"Yellow Tracksuit"	Andy Page	3:39
7.	"Last Day of Winter"	Vector Lovers	2:19
8.	"Das Land Spricht (Post Apocalypse)"	Stefan Anion	3:02
9.	"The River (Ambient Mix)"	Spooky	3:26
10.	"Going Home"	John Murphy	1:40
11.	"Saladin (Hybrid Remix)"	Harry Gregson-Williams	5:27
12.	"Soldier's requiem"	John Murphy	1:16
13.	"Shadows of the City"	Charlotte James	9:14
14.	"Arp Thing"	Barry Jamieson	1:43
15.	"World Citizen – I Won't Be Disappointed / Looped Piano Music"	Ryuichi Sakamoto Feat. David Sylvian	6:52
16.	"Man on Fire"	Harry Gregson-Williams Feat. Lisa Gerrard	4:43
Total length:			55:55

Disc 2
No.	Title	Artist	Length
1.	"Coma (Spangled Rubdub)"	Sasha	2:34
2.	"Surin"	Quivver	5:01
3.	"Identity (King Unique Mix)"	Luke Dzierzek	6:04
4.	"A Dark Distance"	Shifter & Carvell	8:16
5.	"Just One More (Hybrid's Matrix Dub)"	Long Range	5:31
6.	"Lonesfield"	Soliquid	6:31
7.	"The Formula of Fear (Hybrid's Echoplex Remix)"	Hybrid Feat. Charlotte James	9:32
8.	"$50 Pistol (Shifter & Carvell Remix)"	Hybrid Feat. Harry Gregson-Williams	4:31
9.	"Confrontation"	Lank	7:01
10.	"Fortune Cookie (Jerome Isma-Ae Mix)"	Oliver Moldan Vs. Harada	3:01
11.	"Electro Pop (Ambient Mix)"	Steffano Greppi	1:30
12.	"Shivva"	Elite Force	4:23
Total length:			64:41

== Trivia ==
- "Desert Chase" is originally from the Seraphim Falls soundtrack.
- "Sweet Is Good" is originally from the Danny The Dog soundtrack. The track is absent in the American version.
- "Going Home" is originally from the 28 Weeks Later soundtrack.
- "Soldier's requiem" is originally from the 28 Days Later soundtrack.
- "Saladin" is originally from the Kingdom of Heaven soundtrack.
- "World Citizen – I Won't Be Disappointed / Looped Piano Music" is originally from the Babel soundtrack, but has been re-edited for this album by Hybrid.
- In the liner notes in the booklet, "Gamma" is misspelt "Gama."
- Some of the tracks' full names are listed in the booklet.
- "6AM Sedna" uses samples from the track "Shortcut To Granuland" from the Lostep album "Because We Can", along with an extra vocal sample.
