= If I Survive =

Single by Hybrid featuring Julee Cruise

from the album Wide Angle
- Released: 30 August 1999
- Length: 9:40 (full version); 8:40 (album version); 8:27 (Classics version); 3:40 (radio edit)
- Label: Distinctive Records
- Songwriter(s): Mike Truman, Chris Healings
- Producer(s): Hybrid

Hybrid singles chronology
"Finished Symphony" (1999)	"If I Survive" (1999)	"Kid 2000" (2000)

"If I Survive" is a song by British electronic music group Hybrid, featuring Julee Cruise. It is the second single from their debut studio album, Wide Angle, and was released by Distinct'ive Records on 30 August 1999. The single was the band's biggest commercial success, reaching #52 in the UK Singles Chart, and helped promote the album.

The group continues to perform the song at live events, and the song has since been featured on their 2012 greatest hits album, Classics.

== Track listing ==
=== UK ===
No.	Title	Length
1.	"If I Survive (Radio Edit)"	3:41
2.	"If I Survive (Way Out West Remix)"	7:24
3.	"If I Survive (Interfearance Remix)"	7:23

=== Australia & New Zealand ===
No.	Title	Length
1.	"If I Survive (Radio Edit)"	3:41
2.	"If I Survive (Way Out West Remix)"	7:24
3.	"If I Survive (Original Mix)"	9:40
4.	"If I Survive (Hybrid Echoplex Remix)"	8:53
5.	"If I Survive (Interfearance Remix)"	7:23

=== Hong Kong ===
No.	Title	Length
1.	"If I Survive (Radio Edit)"	3:41
2.	"If I Survive (Way Out West Remix)"	7:24
3.	"If I Survive (Way Out West Dub)"	6:50
4.	"If I Survive (Interfearance Remix)"	7:23
5.	"If I Survive (Interfearance Dub)"	6:39
6.	"If I Survive (Hybrid Echoplex Remix)"	8:53
7.	"If I Survive (Hybrid Tyrant Dub)"	6:50
8.	"If I Survive (Beber's Boleyn West Stand Mix)"	7:21
9.	"If I Survive (Original Mix)"	9:40

== Charts ==
Chart	Peak position
UK Singles Chart (OCC)	52
UK Dance Singles (OCC)	13

== Trivia ==
- The song was used in the PlayStation 2 racing game Kinetica.
- The song (and "I Know") was featured in the American television series CSI: NY.
