= The Art of Being a Girl =

Studio album by Julee Cruise
- Released: August 2002
- Genres: Ambient pop; downtempo
- Label: Water Music Records
- Producer: J.J. McGeehan

Julee Cruise chronology
The Voice of Love (1993)	The Art of Being a Girl (2002)	My Secret Life (2011)

Professional ratings
Review scores
Source	Rating
AllMusic	4/5 stars
Blender	3/5 stars
Rolling Stone	3/5 stars

The Art of Being a Girl is the third album by Julee Cruise and was released in 2002. Released nine years after her previous album, Cruise departs from the dream pop-laden sound of her first two releases for a more jazz and electronica sound.

== Track listing ==
All tracks composed by Julee Cruise and J.J. McGeehan; except where noted.

1. "You're Staring at Me" – 3:43
2. "The Orbiting Beatnik (For Keith)" – 4:29
3. "Falling in Love..." (Julee Cruise, Mocean Worker) – 5:56
4. "The Art of Being a Girl" (Julee Cruise, J.J. McGeehan, Khan) – 4:57
5. "Everybody Knows" – 3:11
6. "9th Ave. Limbo" (Julee Cruise, Kevin Tooley) – 5:05
7. "Slow Hot Wind" (Henry Mancini, Norman Gimbel) – 3:58
8. "Cha Cha in the Dark" (Julee Cruise, Rick Strom) – 4:16
9. "Shine" – 4:17
10. "Beachcomber Voodoo" – 4:49
11. "Three Jack Swing" – 3:54
12. "The Fire in Me" – 8:52
13. "Falling" (Angelo Badalamenti, David Lynch) (hidden track) – 5:29

== Personnel ==
- Julee Cruise – vocals, vocal melodies
- J.J. McGeehan – guitar, keyboards, percussion
- Graham Hawthorne – additional drums
- Barry Danielian – trumpet
- Allison Cornell – viola
- Marlon Saunders – vocals
- Ari Benjamin – voice over

Technical

- Julee Cruise – executive producer
- Kevin Tooley, Khan, Mocean Worker, Rick Strom – special guest producers
- Frank Fagnano – post-production engineer
- Alissa Levin – design
- Leslie Lyons – photography
