= Finished Symphony =

Single by Hybrid

from the album Wide Angle
- Released: June 28, 1999
- Recorded: UK, Russia
- Label: Distinct'ive Breaks
- Songwriters: Mike Truman, Chris Healings, Lee Mullin
- Producer: Hybrid

Hybrid singles chronology
"Fall Out Of Love" (1996)	"Finished Symphony" (1999)	"If I Survive" (1999)

"Finished Symphony" is a song by the Welsh electronic music group Hybrid. It is the first single from their debut album Wide Angle. The track's popularity has increased since its release, and it has been used in various chillout collections, including the Ibiza series. The song has also been used in BBC's TV series Top Gear, most notably during Season 7 Episode 5 which featured the Bugatti Veyron. There are two versions of the single, the UK version and Australia and Hong Kong version.

All orchestral parts of the song are performed by the Russian Federal Orchestra.

A remix by Canadian electronic music producer Deadmau5 was made for Hybrid's 2007 album Re_Mixed.

== Track listing ==
=== UK ===
1. "Finished Symphony" (Original Radio Edit) - 3:29
2. "Finished Symphony" (Hybrid's Echoplex Mix Radio Edit) - 3:23
3. "Finished Symphony" - 9:34
4. "Finished Symphony" (Hybrid's Soundtrack Edit) - 3:21

=== Australia & Hong Kong ===
1. "Finished Symphony" (Original Radio Edit) - 3:26
2. "Finished Symphony" (Hybrid Echoplex Mix Radio Edit) - 3:21
3. "Finished Symphony" - 9:31
4. "Finished Symphony" (Hybrid Soundtrack Edit) - 3:19
5. "Finished Symphony" (Hybrid Echoplex Remix) - 9:06
6. "Finished Symphony" (Hybrid Soundtrack Mix) - 6:13

== Official versions ==
- "Finished Symphony" (Original Radio Edit) - 3:26
- "Finished Symphony" (Hybrid Echoplex Mix Radio Edit) - 3:21
- "Finished Symphony" - 9:31
- "Finished Symphony" (Hybrid Echoplex Remix) - 9:06
- "Finished Symphony" (Hybrid Soundtrack Edit) - 3:19
- "Finished Symphony" (Hybrid Soundtrack Mix) - 6:13
- "Finished Symphony" (Live Set) - 11:32

== Charts ==
Chart	Peak position
UK Singles Chart (OCC)	55
UK Dance Chart (OCC)	12
