= Julee Cruise =

American singer (1956–2022)

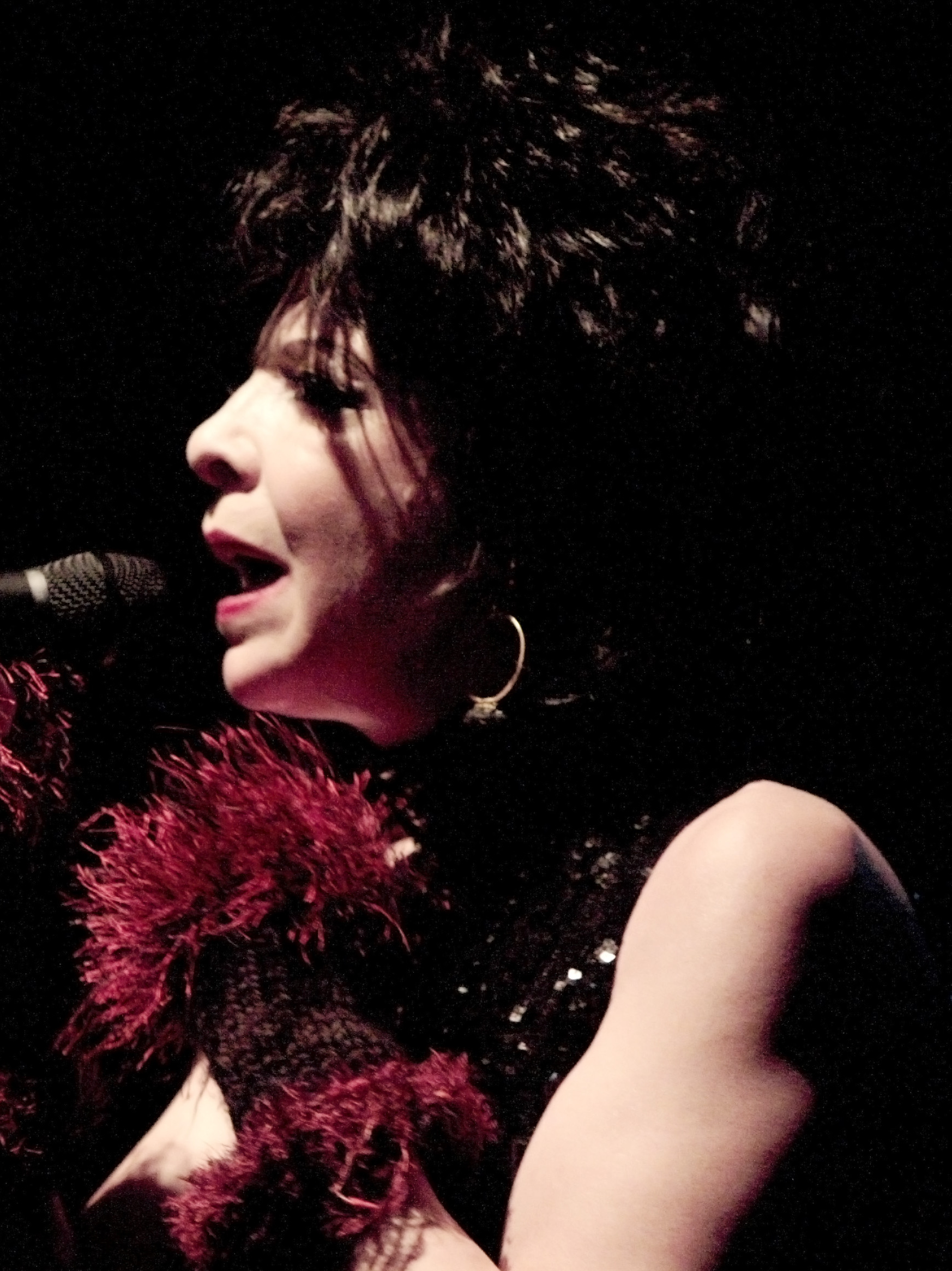
- Cruise performing at La Route du Rock in 2008
- Born: Julee Ann Cruise; December 1, 1956; Creston, Iowa, U.S.
- Died: June 9, 2022 (aged 65); Pittsfield, Massachusetts, U.S.
- Education: Drake University
- Occupations: Singer; actress
- Years active: 1985–2018
- Spouse: Edward Grinnan (m. 1988)
- Musical career
- Genres: Dream pop
- Instrument: Vocals
- Labels: Warner Bros.; WEA International; Avex Asia; Distinctive; Playhouse

Julee Ann Cruise (December 1, 1956 – June 9, 2022) was an American singer and actress, known for her collaborations with composer Angelo Badalamenti and filmmaker David Lynch in the late 1980s and early 1990s. She released four albums beginning with 1989's Floating into the Night.

Cruise is best known for her 1989 single "Falling"; an instrumental version was used as the theme song for the television series Twin Peaks in which she appeared in a recurring role as a roadhouse singer. She reprised the role in the 1992 movie Twin Peaks: Fire Walk with Me (which also featured her music), and in the 2017 revival series Twin Peaks: The Return. She was also featured in Lynch and Badalamenti's avant-garde 1990 theater production Industrial Symphony No. 1, which was filmed and released on home media.

Other notable singles included "Rockin' Back Inside My Heart" (1990) and "If I Survive" (1999) by the band Hybrid, which featured her vocals. In the 1990s, she was a touring member of the B-52's, filling in for Cindy Wilson. Cruise was also a stage actress and appeared in the off-Broadway musicals Return to the Forbidden Planet and Radiant Baby in 2004. Her final album, My Secret Life, was released in 2011.

== Early life ==
Born in Creston, Iowa, Julee Ann Cruise was the daughter of John Cruise, the town dentist, and Wilma Cruise, who was his office manager. She studied French horn at Drake University and performed as a singer and actress in Minneapolis with the Children's Theatre Company (notably in the role of Jinjur in stage adaptations of L. Frank Baum's Oz books).

She moved to New York and played Janis Joplin in a revue called Beehive, while also working with Angelo Badalamenti.

== Career ==
=== Collaborations with Badalamenti and Lynch ===
In 1985, Badalamenti was composing the score for David Lynch's Blue Velvet, as well as serving as the vocal coach for the film's star, Isabella Rossellini. A key scene in Blue Velvet was intended to feature This Mortal Coil's version of "Song to the Siren" by Tim Buckley, with lead vocal by Elizabeth Fraser. When it proved prohibitively expensive to obtain rights to use the song, it was suggested that Badalamenti compose a pop song in the same style, with lyrics written by Lynch. Because the song required a vocalist with a haunting, ethereal voice, Badalamenti recommended Cruise, who had sung in a New York theater workshop Badalamenti had produced. The result of their initial collaboration was "Mysteries of Love", which figures prominently in Blue Velvet's closing scenes and gained a cult following.

Badalamenti and Lynch went on to write and produce additional songs for Cruise, most of which were featured in her debut album, Floating into the Night (1989). The album was released on September 12, 1989, by Warner Bros. Records, and charted on Billboard the following year. It also provided musical material for Lynch's Industrial Symphony No. 1, in which Cruise performed while "floating" from a harness dozens of feet above a stage at the Brooklyn Academy of Music.

The second, more significant project was the soundtrack to Lynch's Twin Peaks, for which Badalamenti composed the original score. The song "Falling", which became the orchestral theme for the television series, caused a minor sensation, winning a Grammy at the 33rd Annual Grammy Awards in 1991 for Best Pop Instrumental. The Twin Peaks soundtrack, featuring Cruise on the songs "Into the Night" and "The Nightingale" as well as on the vocal version of "Falling", eventually went gold (500,000+ copies) in the U.S., a rare feat for a television soundtrack. Cruise made a number of appearances on Twin Peaks as a singer at a local bar, and was prominently featured in both the show's landmark pilot episode and the episode where Laura Palmer's murderer is revealed, as well as in 1992's Twin Peaks: Fire Walk with Me. "Rockin' Back Inside My Heart", the second single from Floating into the Night, was released in 1990 and was also featured in an episode of Twin Peaks along with "The World Spins"; in the episode, several of the main female characters are shown lip-synching to "Rockin' Back Inside My Heart".

Cruise reinterpreted and sang the theme song for an episode of the USA Network show Psych. The episode, "Dual Spires", was about a secluded town full of secrets and skeletons while they investigate the murder of a girl. It aired 20 years to the day after Laura Palmer's murderer was revealed.

Cruise appeared on Saturday Night Live on May 12, 1990, filling in along with Spanic Boys on short notice when scheduled performer Sinéad O'Connor refused to appear on the same show as guest host Andrew Dice Clay. Cruise performed "Falling".

The following year, Cruise recorded a Lynch- and Badalamenti-produced cover of the Elvis Presley song "Summer Kisses, Winter Tears" for the soundtrack of Wim Wenders's Until the End of the World. Afterward, Cruise maintained a relatively low profile until her second album, The Voice of Love, was released in 1993. An instrumental version of "She Would Die for Love" was used as the main theme for the movie Twin Peaks: Fire Walk with Me.

"She Would Die for Love" was also covered by alternative metal band Fantômas on their The Director's Cut album as "Twin Peaks: Fire Walk with Me".

Cruise's early collaborations with Angelo Badalamenti and David Lynch were closely related to Lynch's film work, which was reflected in the lyrics. For example, "Into the Night" begins with the whispered words "Now it's dark", a line which was repeatedly spoken by Frank Booth, Dennis Hopper's character, in Blue Velvet. Lynch also photographed Cruise for the liner notes of Floating Into the Night and The Voice of Love, and created the sculptures featured on the covers of both albums.

In 2017, she appeared in Part 17 of the new Twin Peaks season performing "The World Spins".

Cruise released the EP Three Demos in 2018, containing the original demo versions of "Floating", "Falling", and "The World Spins".

=== Post-Badalamenti and Lynch ===
Cruise's long-delayed third album, The Art of Being a Girl, was released in 2002. This was the first of her albums for which Badalamenti and Lynch did not produce or write any of the music. Instead, the music and lyrics for each of the songs were written by Cruise herself (with the exception of an updated version of the single "Falling"), and produced by Rick Strom and Mocean Worker.

In 2011, Cruise released her fourth album, My Secret Life. The album was a collaboration with DJ Dmitry (formerly of Deee-Lite) and contained a cover of Donovan's "Season of the Witch" and a cover (technically) of Hybrid's "Fatal Beating" called "A Fatal Beating".

Cruise also acted and sang in the off-Broadway cast of Return to the Forbidden Planet, a spoof of William Shakespeare's The Tempest, and toured with The B-52's as Cindy Wilson's touring stand-in on and off from 1992 to 1999. She also performed regularly with Bobby McFerrin's improvisational vocal group Voicestra/CircleSong.

She appeared as Andy Warhol (among other characters, including Susan Sontag) in the 2004 Keith Haring bio-musical Radiant Baby at The Public Theater/New York Shakespeare Festival, directed by George C. Wolfe.

=== Other collaborations ===
Cruise lent her vocals to works by a miscellaneous list of collaborators, mostly in electronic music. She collaborated with Moby on his song "Drown Disco" which remains unreleased.

She provided vocals and lyrics to several of the songs on Wide Angle (1999), the debut album by Welsh electronic music group Hybrid, notably the nu skool breaks track "If I Survive". In 1999, she performed on two songs on Don't Panic! by DJ Silver, "Sweet Dreams" and "I'm Your Girl".

She appeared on the albums 1-900-Get-Khan (1999) and No Comprendo (2001) by dance artist Khan (Can Oral), and performed live and toured numerous times with him. The lyrics for many of these songs, such as "Body Dump", reflect Cruise's own interest in true crime. Their most successful collaboration, the classic "Say Good-bye", was a hit in Europe and elsewhere.

She was featured in two songs on Supa DJ Dmitry's (formerly of Deee-Lite) album Scream of Consciousness (2000): "Don't Talk Me Down" (originally issued on TVT 7311-0 12") and a cover of David Bowie's "Space Oddity".

She appeared on a number of tracks on both the 2003 album Dreams Top Rock and the 2007 album Monstrous Surplus by German post-rock act Pluramon, a pseudonym of the musician Marcus Schmickler. Cruise appeared as a guest vocalist on Sarcast While, the 2006 full-length album from the New York band, Time of Orchids, released on Tzadik Records. Her vocals appeared on five tracks on Kenneth Bager's 2006 album Fragments from a Space Cadet.

Cruise provided the vocals for Delerium's "Magic" song (on the Chimera album). She also provided vocals alongside Pharrell Williams on Handsome Boy Modeling School's song "Class System", produced by Prince Paul. Additionally, she contributed vocals on Ror-Shak's 2007 album Deep, on the song "Fate or Faith".

Cruise was photographed in London by the fashion photographer Matt Colombo in an editorial that appeared in issue No. 49 of Zoo Magazine in 2015.

==== Cover versions, film soundtracks and adverts ====
Cruise recorded several memorable covers over the years, including Sir Cliff Richard's "Wired for Sound" with B(if)tek, R.E.M.'s "It's the End of the World as We Know It (And I Feel Fine)" with Eric Kupper, Eurythmics's "Sweet Dreams (Are Made of This)" with DJ Silver, Elvis Presley's "Summer Kisses, Winter Tears", and David Bowie's "Space Oddity" with Supa DJ Dmitry.

In 1991, Cruise contributed the song "Summer Kisses, Winter Tears" to the "Until the End of the World" soundtrack.

In 1996, Cruise with the Flow appeared on the Scream soundtrack with the song "Artificial World (Interdimensional Mix)".

In 2001, Cruise contributed two exclusive tracks to the An American Nightmare (which stars David Hess) soundtrack CD maxi-single, "In Your World of Blue" and "Never let you go".

In 2003, Depeche Mode songwriter Martin Gore included a cover version of Cruise's song "In My Other World" (from her 1993 album The Voice of Love) on Counterfeit², the second in his series of cover albums dedicated to his own musical influences and atmospheric inspirations. That same year, Cruise's song "The World Spins" was featured in an extended ballet sequence in Robert Altman's The Company.

A modified sample of Cruise's song "I Float Alone" was used as the backing track in the Dean Blunt song "The Narcissist".

Cruise's song "Floating" was featured in TV advertisements and trailers for the show The Riches, which debuted on FX in March 2007. The next year her music was used in CSI: Miami and in episode 12 of season 5 of Psych, "Dual Spires", she sang a rendition of Psych's theme song. The episode was a spoof of Twin Peaks.

In 2012, her song "The World Spins" was used in an episode of the TV show House.

== Personal life ==
Cruise married Edward Grinnan, an author and editor, in 1988. They lived in Manhattan and in the Berkshires.

== Health and death ==
On March 28, 2018, Cruise announced on her Facebook page that she had systemic lupus, which caused her considerable pain and affected her ability to walk and stand. She also had depression. Reflecting on death in a 2018 interview with Pitchfork, Cruise said, "But I'm not gonna get buried. I'm going to have my ashes mixed in with my dogs'. They're gonna spread my ashes across Arizona, and Arizona is going to turn blue. It's not gonna be a red state anymore."

Cruise died in Pittsfield, Massachusetts, on June 9, 2022, aged 65; her death was a suicide. Her husband, Edward Grinnan, said that she "left this realm on her own terms. No regrets. She is at peace ... I played her 'Roam' during her transition. Now she will roam forever. Rest in Peace, my love".

== Discography ==
=== Studio albums ===
Title	Album details	Peak chart positions							Certifications
Title	Album details	US	AUS	CAN	FIN	NZ	SWE	UK	Certifications
Floating into the Night	Released: September 12, 1989; Label: Warner Bros.	74	21	27	30	11	36	— (Note: Did not enter the Official Albums chart, but did reach number 71 on the Album Downloads chart in 2022.)	BPI: Silver
The Voice of Love	Released: October 12, 1993; Label: Warner Bros.	—	—	—	—	—	—	—	
The Art of Being a Girl	Released: August 2002; Label: Water Music	—	—	—	—	—	—	—	
My Secret Life	Released: March 1, 2011; Label: Purley Sounds	—	—	—	—	—	—	—	

=== Compilation albums ===
Title	Album details	Peak chart positions	
Title	Album details	SCO	UK
Fall Float Love: Works 1989–1993	Released: 18 April 2025; Label: Cherry Red UK	63	— (Note: Did not enter the Official Albums chart, but did appear on the following charts: Number 26 on the Independent Albums chart.; Number 73 on the Physical Albums chart.; Number 79 on the Albums Sales chart.)

=== Extended plays ===
Title	EP details
Three Demos	Released: August 17, 2018; Label: Sacred Bones

=== Singles ===
Year	Title	Chart positions							Certifications	Album
Year	Title	US Alt	AUS	FIN	IRE	NZ	SWE	UK	Certifications	Album
1990	"Falling"	11	1	2	5	33	2	7	ARIA: Gold; GLF: Gold	Floating into the Night
1991	"Rockin' Back Inside My Heart"	—	107	—	18	—	—	66		Floating into the Night
1991	"Summer Kisses, Winter Tears"	—	—	—	—	—	—	—		Until the End of the World: Music from the Motion Picture Soundtrack
1992	"Questions in a World of Blue" (promo only)	—	—	—	—	—	—	—		The Voice of Love
1993	"Movin' In on You" (promo only)	—	—	—	—	—	—	—		The Voice of Love
1999	"If I Survive" (by Hybrid)	—	—	—	—	—	—	52		Wide Angle

=== Collaborations ===
- Can "Khan" Oral ("Say Goodbye", "Body Dump", "Noewhere", and EP album San Jose)
- Hybrid ("If I Survive", "I Know", "Dreaming Your Dreams", "High Life", and "Fatal Beating" in the album Wide Angle)
- Angelo Badalamenti (music from Twin Peaks)
- DJ Dmitry ("Don't Talk Me Down" on the album Screams of Consciousness and producer of Cruise's album My Secret Life)
- The Flow ("Artificial World" on the Scream soundtrack)
- Moby ("Drown Disco")
- The B-52's (tour member during the 1990s)
- Mocean Worker ("Falling in Love")
- David Lynch (music from Twin Peaks and Industrial Symphony No. 1)
- B(if)tek ("Wired for Sound" – AUS #82)
- Bobby McFerrin (performed in McFerrin's improv group)
- Kenneth Bager ("Fragment Two", "Fragment Seven", "Fragment Ten", and "Fragment Eleven" on the album Fragments from a Space Cadet)
- DJ Silver ("Sweet Dreams", "I'm Your Girl", and "Si Chiama Amore")
- Ror Shak ("Fate or Faith")
- Delerium ("Magic" on the album Chimera)
- Handsome Boy Modeling School (Prince Paul & Dan the Automator) (song "Class System" duet with Pharrell on the album White People)
- Marcus Schmickler (aka Pluramon; on the albums Dreams Top Rock and The Monstrous Surplus)
- Moodswings ("Into the Blue" on the album Horizontal)
- Time of Orchids ("A Man to Hide" on the album Sarcast While)
- Atmo. Brtschitsch ("Everyday" on the album Change Your Life)
- King Dude ("Animal" on the single Julee Cruise & King Dude Sing Each Other's Songs For You)
