= Wide Angle =

Studio album by Hybrid
- Released: 13 September 1999
- Recorded: 1996–99
- Genre: Progressive breaks
- Length: 76:23
- Label: Distinct'ive Records
- Producer: Hybrid

Hybrid chronology
Wide Angle (1999)	Morning Sci-Fi (2003)

Singles from Wide Angle
- 1. "Finished Symphony" Released: 28 June 1999; 2. "If I Survive" Released: 12 August 1999

Singles from Wider Angle
- 1. "Kid 2000" Released: 8 August 2000

Alternate cover

Professional ratings
Review scores
Source	Rating
AllMusic	4.5/5 stars
Rolling Stone	3/5 stars
Slant Magazine	3.5/5 stars

Wide Angle is the debut studio album by Welsh breakbeat group Hybrid. It was released to critical acclaim, described by The Times as "one of the most moving pieces of electronic music ever". The album was re-released in 2000 as a double-CD edition entitled Wider Angle.

== Background ==
The core Hybrid duo of Mike Truman and Chris Healings cooperated with Lee Mullin to create the dance music backbone of the album, with a mix of progressive breakbeat, techno, trance and house. However, they were joined by a wide array of musical personnel for this expansive, symphonic album. Orchestral parts were performed by the Russian Federal Orchestra, conducted by Sacha Puttnam, who was also responsible for the orchestral arrangements. Julee Cruise, best known for the theme of Twin Peaks, supplied vocals on several songs, and Soon E MC added French rapping to "Sinequanon".

In 2000, the album was re-released as a double CD package, labelled Wider Angle. The second CD, titled Live Angle, featured a live set with Alex Madge on drums and Jamie Griffiths on turntables, and several singles, including "Kid 2000" with Chrissie Hynde.

== Track listing ==
=== UK version ===
CD1: Wide Angle
No.	Title	Length
1.	"Opening Credits"	1:20
2.	"If I Survive" (with Julee Cruise)	8:41
3.	"I Know" (with Julee Cruise)	8:31
4.	"Beachcoma"	6:29
5.	"Dreaming Your Dreams" (with Julee Cruise)	7:12
6.	"Snyper"	6:19
7.	"Theme from Wide Angle"	6:28
8.	"Sinequanon" (with Soon E MC)	7:18
9.	"High Life" (with Julee Cruise)	7:22
10.	"Fatal Beating" (with Julee Cruise)	4:29
11.	"Finished Symphony"	9:36
12.	"Altitude (Red Square Reprise)"	2:30
Total length:		76:23

CD2: Live Angle (Wider Angle bonus disc)
No.	Title	Length
1.	"Kid 2000" (with Chrissie Hynde)	11:27
2.	"Burnin"	8:10
3.	"Snyper"	8:17
4.	"Accelerator"	7:12
5.	"High Life"	8:41
6.	"Finished Symphony"	11:32
7.	"Kill City" (Bonus Track)	5:51
8.	"Altitude" (Bonus Track)	6:28
9.	"Kid 2000*" (12" Original Mix) (with Chrissie Hynde)	6:16

=== US version ===
The US version had 13 tracks and the tracks were mixed differently.

No.	Title	Length
1.	"Opening Credits"	1:20
2.	"If I Survive" (with Julee Cruise)	8:41
3.	"I Know" (with Julee Cruise)	8:31
4.	"Beachcoma"	6:29
5.	"Dreaming Your Dreams" (with Julee Cruise)	7:12
6.	"Snyper"	6:19
7.	"Theme from Wide Angle"	6:28
8.	"Sinequanon" (with Soon E MC)	6:09
9.	"Kill City (Edit)"	5:32
10.	"Altitude (Edit)"	6:09
11.	"Finished Symphony"	9:36
12.	"Altitude (Red Square Reprise)"	2:38
13.	"Kid 2000" (Bonus Track)	4:53

== Charts ==
Chart	Peak position
UK Albums Chart (OCC)	45
