= Jerome Sydenham =

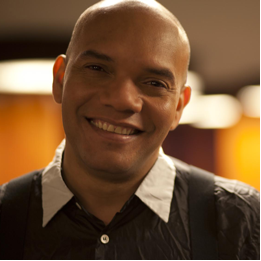

Background information
- Also known as: Casino J, Downtown Brooklyn Inc
- Born: 1967 (age 58–59)
- Genres: House, techno
- Occupations: Musician, DJ, record producer, label owner
- Years active: 1989–present
- Labels: Ibadan, Afromatic, Kraftmatik, Apotek, Avocado, Public Service
- Awards: Underground Archives Choice Awards: Track of The Year Ferrer & Sydenham "Sandcastles" 2004

Jerome Sydenham is an American music producer, label owner and DJ with expertise in A&R, art and fashion curation. He is the owner of Bodija Music Publishing (BMG) and Bodija Music (ASCAP).

== Early life ==
Born and raised in Ibadan, Nigeria, Sydenham developed a spiritual connection to music from an early age. Inspired by musicians such as King Sunny Adé and Fela Kuti, as well as the sounds of Fuji Reggae and Apkala music. Upon completing his primary and secondary education in Nigeria, he went on to attain his A-Levels in the UK. During this period between boarding school and London, his cultural palate was expanded through exposure to a variety of new genres of music and social expression. He then moved to New York in 1985 to study at NYU.

== Career ==
While enjoying New York’s vibrant club scene, his interest in vinyl records and DJ culture became increasingly serious. The turning point in his career came in 1988, when Sydenham secured a residency at Nell’s nightclub in New York City. This marked the beginning of his professional journey as a young executive in the A&R department at Atlantic and East West Records. He contributed to the success of En Vogue, Simply Red, Das EFX, Snow and Gerald Levert.

He is based in Berlin, Germany running record labels including Ibadan Records as well as touring as a DJ and producing electronic music.

Sydenham was recruited into the A&R division of Atlantic Records in 1989. While at Atlantic/ East West Records (Time Warner), under the tutelage of Merlin Bobb and Silvia Rhone Jerome Sydenham enjoyed commercial success as the youngest African record executive in the American corporate music industry.

== A&R achievements ==
=== Gold records ===
- LeVert – "Private Line" (single) (1991)
- En Vogue – "My Lovin" (first single from Funky Divas) (1992)
- En Vogue – "Giving Him Something He Can Feel" (second single from Funky Divas) (1992)
- En Vogue – "Free Your Mind" (third single from Funky Divas) (1992)
- En Vogue – "Give It Up, Turn It Loose" (fourth single from Funky Divas) (1993)
- Da Lench Mob – Guerillas in tha Mist (album) (1992)
- Das EFX – "They Want EFX" (single) (1992)

=== Platinum records ===
- En Vogue – Born to Sing (album) (1990)
- En Vogue – Funky Divas (album) (1990), US 5× platinum
- En Vogue – "Hold On" (single from Born to Sing) (1992)
- Simply Red – Stars (album) (1991), US 12× platinum
- Snow – 12 Inches of Snow (album) (1992)
- Snow – "Informer" (single) (1992)
- Das EFX – Dead Serious (album) (1992)

He was executive producer for "Underground Dance Music Vol. 1" (Atlantic, 1992) showcasing some of the earliest productions from a young Roger Sanchez, Murk and Pal Joey, Kerri Chandler (In 2006 Sydenham, acting as executive producer, re-issued these records under Ibadan Records). He would continue to work with the likes of Dennis Ferrer, Adam Bayer (Drumcode), Ron Trent, Joe Claussell, The Martinez Brothers and Seth Troxler.

== Label management ==
Ibadan Records
- Founded: 1995
- Founder: Jerome Sydenham
- Status: Active
- Genre: House, deep house, Afro house, tech house, techno
- Location: New York City (1995-2008); Berlin (2008-present)

After leaving the corporate world, Sydenham established his first independent label, Pallas Records, 1994 (a boutique golden e-rap label alongside hip hop pioneer Fab 5 Freddy). The Label focused on hip-hop and R&B, and achieved platinum success with the Chicago hip-hop group Crucial Conflict, as well as underground success with West Coast street legend Erule and his enduring hip-hop classic "Listen Up".

In 1995 Sydenham founded Ibadan Records (House, Techno) in New York City, though it is now run out of Berlin, Germany. The label celebrated its 15-year anniversary in 2010, 30th anniversary in 2025.

== Events ==
In August 2022, Sydenham orchestrated the inaugural African cultural event "Afromatic Tokyo". This bespoke showcase of contemporary African art, Afrobeats Music, and haute couture African fashion (including the closing of Tokyo Fashion Week, 2022) culminated in the first A-list African art auction (in the Hillside Terrace Gallery) in Japanese history. Many such events followed. In June 2026, Jerome Sydenham participated as a guest curator for, asset management corporation, Capital Group’s annual "Taking Pride in Art"exhibition.

== DJ career ==
Sydenham’s "ever-expanding love affair" with electronic music led to an international DJ career that has spanned most major cities and countries across the globe including remote locations such as Siberia, Cambodia, and Hokkaido, Japan. In 1995, he founded the now-legendary Ibadan Records imprint, which continues to make a lasting impact on the music industry in 2026. He extended his influence by creating Apotek, Avocado and Royal Babylon (Techno), Kraftmatic and Ibadan (House). Jerome Sydenham’s expansion into the cultural sphere gave birth to Afromatic.

In 2008, Sydenham permanently settled in Berlin, performing primarily at Berghain and Panorama Bar. Also, he was appearing frequently at many of Berlin’s major clubs whilst continuing his international endeavours.

== See also ==
- List of house music artists
