= Morning Sci-Fi =

Studio album by Hybrid
- Released: 13 October 2003
- Recorded: 2002–03
- Genre: Electronic, trip hop, breakbeat
- Length: 76:23
- Label: Distinct'ive Breaks
- Producer: Hybrid

Hybrid chronology
Wide Angle (1999)	Morning Sci-Fi (2003)	I Choose Noise (2006)

Singles from Morning Sci-Fi
- 1. "True to Form" Released: 15 September 2003; 2. "Higher Than a Skyscraper" Released: 9 February 2004; 3. "I'm Still Awake" Released: 5 July 2004

Professional ratings
Review scores
Source	Rating
AllMusic	4/5 stars
Progressive-Sounds	8/10
Release Magazine	8/10
Resident Advisor	4/5 stars

Morning Sci-Fi is the second studio album by British electronic music producers Hybrid. The album includes a hidden track titled "Lights Go Down, Knives Come Out", which is hidden before the first indexed track and can be accessed by rewinding.

== Track listing ==
=== CD: Morning Sci-Fi ===
No.	Title	Length
0.	"Lights Go Down, Knives Come Out" (hidden track; accessible by rewinding from the first track)	6:06
1.	"This Is What It Means"	1:20
2.	"True to Form" (featuring Peter Hook)	9:14
3.	"Know Your Enemy"	5:58
4.	"Marrakech"	5:45
5.	"I'm Still Awake"	6:24
6.	"Visible Noise"	7:12
7.	"We Are in Control"	6:03
8.	"Higher Than a Skyscraper" (featuring Peter Hook)	5:34
9.	"Steal You Away"	5:26
10.	"Gravastar"	5:01
11.	"Out of the Dark"	7:17
12.	"Blackout" (featuring Kirsty Hawkshaw)	6:31

=== DVD: Morning Sci-Fi Bonus DVD ===
The bonus DVD includes the 40-minute 'Dishing Pump' documentary directed by Myles Cooper about their 2000 tour with Moby, interviews, and live concert footage from their performance at Dublin, Ireland in May 2003. The DVD includes a few easter eggs - one of which is the symphonic instrumental of their song "Finished Symphony" from their first studio album Wide Angle, which can be heard by accessing the Info menu. Another one, an unreleased mix of "Higher Than a Skyscraper", can be accessed by selecting the Interviews menu and selecting the tree branch.

== Personnel ==
- Mike Truman – producing, programming, engineering, mixing (all tracks)
- Chris Healings – producing, programming, engineering, mixing (all tracks)
- Adam Taylor – guitar (tracks 1, 2), vocals (tracks 2, 5, 9, 11)
- Peter Hook – bass guitar (tracks 2, 8)
- Kirsty Hawkshaw – vocals (track 12)

== Trivia ==
- "Blackout" is also featured in Kirsty Hawkshaw's second album Meta-Message.
- A version of "Blackout" lasting 9:46 is included on Hybrid Present Y4K. It is listed as "Blackout (Hybrid Y4K edit)" and features Kirsty Hawkshaw's vocals over the backing track/beats that Hybrid previously made for their unofficial remix of R.E.M.'s "The Great Beyond".
- "Higher Than a Skyscraper" is featured in the video game Crackdown.
- On Hybrid's website, unreleased mixes of "True to Form" and "Higher Than a Skyscraper" as well as the album version of "Lights Go Down, Knives Come Out" can be heard.

== Charts ==
Chart	Peak position
UK Albums Chart (OCC)	87
US Dance/Electronic Albums (Billboard)	20
