= City of Prague Philharmonic Orchestra =

Czech orchestra

The City of Prague Philharmonic Orchestra (Czech: Filharmonici města Prahy) is a classical orchestra, predominantly composed of Czech classical, jazz and guest musicians.

The history of the orchestra goes back to the Film Symphony Orchestra (FISYO), which was founded shortly after World War II, in 1947 as the in-house orchestra for the huge Barrandov Film Studios. After separating and fully privatized it initially performed under the name Czech Symphony Orchestra, but had problems with unauthorized use of the name by other Czech ensembles for themselves. Finally in 1992, after the Velvet Revolution, music producer James Fitzpatrick came up with its current name.

The orchestra is drawn from musicians of the State Opera and the Czech National Theatre, and most of its concerts take place at the opera house.

== Recording ==
The orchestra plays and records music for every type of orchestral project, including popular music, films, television series or video games, and for domestic and international clients. The orchestra plays more than 250 recording sessions every year, making it one of the most recorded orchestras in the world.

Recordings have been made for film production companies such as Paramount, Sony, Lucasfilm and many others at Smečky Music Studios. David Lynch returned again in 1997 to record his Lost Highway, and yet again in 2001 to record Mulholland Drive. The orchestra recorded film scores of composer Alexandre Desplat, Angelo Badalamenti, Philip Glass, Howard Shore, Roque Baños, Rachel Portman, Wojciech Kilar, Mychael Danna, Jeff Danna, Alberto Iglesias, Mark Isham, Jóhann Jóhannsson, Ludovic Bource, Gabriel Yared, Brian Tyler, Graeme Revell, Jon Brion, Patrick Doyle or Bear McCreary.

The orchestra is well known for recording critically acclaimed reconstructions of the original scores for classical Hollywood movies like Ben Hur, Lawrence of Arabia, King of Kings, Quo Vadis, El Cid, The Thief of Bagdad, The Vikings, The Private Life of Sherlock Holmes, Duel in the Sun, Taras Bulba, Exodus and others.

Among the videogames soundtracks the City of Prague Philharmonic Orchestra recorded are The Movies, Killzone, Viva Piñata, Civilization V, Heavenly Sword, Call of Duty: World at War, Age of Conan, Enslaved: Odyssey to the West, Anno 2070, Kingdoms of Amalur: Reckoning, Elder Scrolls Online, Halo 5: Guardians, Syberia 3, Ghost Recon: Wildlands, The Evil Within 2 or God of War.

The orchestra recorded original music for the television shows Black Mirror, Fargo, Star Wars Rebels, The Last Tycoon, Tyrant, Shaun the Sheep, Britannia and others.

== Concerts ==
In recent years the orchestra has performed many concerts of classical and film music repertoire throughout Europe but especially Germany, where it is the “in house” orchestra for Klassik Radio. Now, with the international acclaim for their prize winning recordings, the orchestra is receiving requests for more and more live concerts around the world. These requests peaked with the orchestra performing in front of an audience of 20,000 in Santiago, Chile with conductor Nic Raine and guest soloist Itzhak Perlman.
