= John Graham (producer) =

- Also known as: Quivver, Space Manoeuvres, Skanna, Stoneproof
- Origin: New Arley, Nuneaton, England, United Kingdom
- Genres: House; alternative rock; progressive trance; progressive house; electronica; breakbeat
- Occupations: Disc jockey, record producer, engineer for Hybrid
- Years active: 1992–present
- Labels: A&M UK, Controlled SubstanceBoz Boz Recordings, AM:PM, Perfecto, VC, Hooj Choons, Distinct'ive, Lost Language, mau5trap

John Graham is a British record producer, songwriter, vocalist who is also known under the pseudonyms Quivver, Skanna, Stoneproof and Space Manoeuvres. He was a former member of music production team Tilt and has recorded and toured with the electronic group Hybrid in the past.

== History ==
John Graham began music production in the early 1990s. Originally, he produced and released several tunes under the name Globe before releasing several darkside jungle singles under the name Skanna. With Neil Barry, under the alias of "Quivver", he released "Saxy Lady" and "Twist & Shout" on A&M Records Lt. UK. Again under the Quivver name he released "Believe in Me" on Perfecto Records. Later, he joined Parks & Wilson as part of Tilt, who produced the top 20 hit "Invisible".

In 1999, Graham left Tilt to pursue a solo career. As Space Manoeuvres with Lea Kenny, he released the popular "Stage One" on Hooj Choons. Graham readopted his "Quivver" moniker to produce "One Last Time" and "She Does" on VC Recordings, a sublabel of Virgin Records. In 2001, he became a resident DJ at Twilo and released Transport 5, the fifth entry in the Tranceport series on Kinetic Records. The next year he produced the follow-up to "Stage One" with "Pluto Disko" under the name Space Manoeuvres. He also founded his own record label, Boz Boz Recordings, in 2003 as part of parent label Trust the DJ Records. In 2004, Boz Boz released Graham's single "Space Manoeuvres Part 3" under Quivver. The next year, Graham released his first album Oid on Lost Language under the moniker Space Manoeuvres. In 2005 he takes part for the Planet Funk album as vocal member.

In 2006, Graham appeared on the electronic group Hybrid third LP, I Choose Noise as a vocalist. Graham has also toured with the group as a semi-permanent vocalist, along with Charlotte James.

In 2008, Graham's album under the Quivver name, Dirty Nails & Vapour Trails was released on Critical Rhythms.

== Usage of other media ==
- The Space Manoeuvres track "Part Three" contains dialogue from the film Dark City, spoken by Kiefer Sutherland.
- The Space Manoeuvres track "Stage One" contains dialogue from the trailer for Event Horizon.

== Selected discography ==
- 1993 Heaven EP as Skanna
- 1994: "Saxy Lady" (UK #56) (as Quivver) (A&M Records Lt. UK)
- 1994: "Twist + Shout" (as Quivver) (AM:PM)
- 1995: "Believe in Me" (UK #56) (as Quivver) (Perfecto)
- 1999: "Everything's Not You" (UK #68) (as Stoneproof) (VC Recordings)
- 1999: "Stage One" (UK #25) (as Space Manoeuvres) (Hooj Choons)
- 2003: Loveless (as Quivver)
- 2005: Factoid [LOSTLP04XX] (as Space Manoeuvres) (Lost Language) Limited 100 edition run of unreleased mixes from Deeptone, Gardner and Southall, & Probspot.
- 2005: Oid (as Space Manoeuvres) (Lost Language)
- 2008: Dirty Nails & Vapour Trails (as Quivver) (Boz Boz)
- 2015: The Fever (as Quivver - feat. Matt Lange) (mau5trap)
- 2018: ReKonstruct (as Quivver) (Controlled Substance)
- 2021: Revelate (as Quivver) (Bedrock Records)
