= Distinctive Records =

British record label

- Parent company: Avex UK (former)
- Founded: 1995
- Country of origin: United Kingdom
- Location: London, United Kingdom
- Official website: distinctiverecords.com

Distinctive Records (formerly Distinct'ive Records) is a UK based record label founded in 1995. The label has hundreds of releases from artists, most notably Hybrid, Way Out West, and Ils.

== History ==
Distinctive Records was initially founded in 1995 and started out as a sublabel of Avex Recordings (UK). In 1998, Avex reorganized, closed two of its labels and only continued trading music recordings as Distinct'ive Records. In 1999, The company began categorizing its genres within the label, sometimes retitling itself "Distinct'ive Breaks", which was often mistaken to be a sublabel of Distinct'ive.

The label gained popularity in 2000 at the launch of its own "Y3K" series.

== Y3K series ==
- Y3K: Deep Progressive Breaks
- Y3K: Soundtrack to the Future

== Y4K series ==
- Y4K: Tayo/Further Still
- Koma & Bones Present: Y4K
- Freq Nasty Presents: Y4K: Next Level Breaks
- Dub Pistols Present: Y4K
- Tayo Presents: Y4K
- ILS Presents: Y4K
- Y4K: Past Lessons, Future Theories
- Überzone Presents: Y4K
- Hybrid Present: Y4K
- Soul of Man Presents: Y4K: Breakin' in Tha House
- Phil K Presents: Y4K
- Ali B Presents: Y4K
- Evil Nine Present: Y4K
- Nubreed Present: Y4K
- DJ Icey Presents: Y4K
- Trouble Soup Present: Y4K
- Annie Nightingale Presents: Y4K
- General Midi Presents: Y4K
- Distinctive Presents: Y4K: The 20th

== Artists ==
- Adam Fielding
- Boom Jinx
- Chris Coco
- DJ Hyper
- Dub Pistols
- General Midi
- Hexadecimal
- Hybrid
- ILL Audio
- Ils
- John Graham
- Way Out West

== See also ==
- List of record labels
