= Ronald Krauss =

Ronald Krauss may refer to:

- Ronald Krauss (medical researcher)
- Ronald Krauss (filmmaker)
