= Parallax (Star Trek: Voyager) =

- Star Trek: Voyager episode
- Episode no.: Season 1 Episode 3
- Directed by: Kim Friedman
- Story by: Jim Trombetta
- Teleplay by: Brannon Braga
- Production code: 103
- Original air date: January 23, 1995

Guest appearances
- Josh Clark – Lieutenant Joseph Carey; Martha Hackett – Ensign Seska; Justin Williams – Crewman Jarvin

Episode chronology
← Previous "Caretaker"	Next → "Time and Again"
- Star Trek: Voyager season 1

"Parallax" is the third episode of the science fiction television series Star Trek: Voyager. The episode was directed by Kim Friedman. The story was written by Jim Trombetta with the teleplay by Brannon Braga.

The starship Voyager detects a distress call and stops to investigate.

This episode aired on UPN on January 23, 1995.

== Casting ==
In this episode, actor Josh Clark guest stars as Starfleet Lt. Joseph Carey, and Martha Hackett as a Maquis, Seska. Martha Hackett had previously guest starred on Star Trek: Deep Space Nine, in "The Search".

== Writing ==
This episode's teleplay was written by Brannon Braga from a story by Jim Trombetta. Brannon Braga was one of the major writers for Star Trek in the late 1990s and early 2000s. Another input to the writing was the Star Trek science advisor Andre Bormanis. One of the inspirations for this story, was the idea of submarine trapped under ice, which then must get to the surface. One idea for being trapped was something like black hole or collapsed star, but because that did not work well from a real science perspective, Bormanis invented the idea of a "Class 4 Singularity" for the episode.

== Plot ==
As Voyager starts its way back home from the Delta Quadrant, tensions between the Starfleet and the Maquis crewmembers begin to rise, and some brief hostilities are incurred. However, both Captain Kathryn Janeway and her first officer, Chakotay, originally the captain of the Maquis crew, agree they need to integrate the two crews as one to fill vacancies left by the disastrous events to date. Of note, Chakotay recommends B'Elanna Torres, one of the more outspoken Maquis and a former Starfleet cadet, to be Chief of Engineering, a move that Janeway is hesitant about, considering that Torres recently broke another engineer's nose in a fight.

As the ship passes near a quantum singularity, the Voyager crew detect a ship stuck in the singularity's event horizon. Receiving no contact with the ship, they attempt to move in closer to engage the ship via tractor beams, but the result damages more of Voyager's systems. Janeway orders the crew to take Voyager to a nearby planet to seek help for the trapped ship. However, after some time has passed, the crew finds themselves back at the singularity, and quickly realize the ship they are seeing is themselves from before. The ship has become trapped in the singularity, and it is impacting several of the ship's systems.

Eventually, they discover a point in space where Voyager crossed into the singularity, but it has since shrunk, too small for Voyager to exit through. Janeway takes Torres, who has knowledge of singularities, on a shuttle to the opening, using the shuttle's shields to expand the opening large enough for Voyager to pass through. However, the result damages their communications systems; on returning to Voyager they find two versions of the ship, both appearing real to their sensors. Though they have a heated argument about which ship is the correct Voyager, Janeway makes the ultimate decision, and correctly picks the right vessel. Voyager leaves the singularity safely and begins to effect repairs. Janeway follows through on Chakotay's advice and promotes Torres to Chief Engineer. Torres in turn apologizes to Lieutenant Carey, whom she had punched, and asks for his assistance. He in turn congratulates her and promises to give her his best.

== Reception ==
"Parallax" was evaluated by USA Today as an interesting episode of the franchise and this series, noting the performance by Kate Mulgrew as Captain Janeway.

This episode explored the idea of temporal reflections. This concept was acknowledged by the 2016 Star Trek novella, Department of Temporal Investigations: Time Lock.

The website Doux Reviews had said "that the "main problem for this episode is that it’s simply dull."

In 2020, Tor.com rated this episode six out of ten.
