= The Stickup =

2002 film by Rowdy Herrington

- Directed by: Rowdy Herrington
- Written by: Rowdy Herrington
- Produced by: Shelly Strong; Dan Howard
- Starring: James Spader; Leslie Stefanson; David Keith; John Livingston; Robert Miano
- Cinematography: Chris Manley
- Edited by: Harry B. Miller III
- Music by: David Kitay
- Production companies: Promark Entertainment Group; Videal GmbH
- Distributed by: DEJ Productions
- Release date: March 21, 2002
- Running time: 97 minutes
- Country: United States
- Language: English

The Stickup is a 2002 American action crime-drama film written and directed by Rowdy Herrington and starring James Spader with Leslie Stefanson and David Keith. It was released in 2002.

== Plot ==
Former police detective John Parker is accused of stealing a half million dollars from a small-town bank. Police detective Ray DeCarlo launches a daring high-speed chase through narrow mountain passes to catch him. In order to prove his innocence, Parker finds Natalie Wright, DeCarlo's ex wife.

== Cast ==
- James Spader as John Parker
- Leslie Stefanson as Natalie Wright
- David Keith as Ray DeCarlo
- John Livingston as FBI Agent Rick Kendall
- Robert Miano as Lt. Vincent Marino
- Alf Humphreys as Mike O'Grady
- Tim Henry as Arlen Morris
- Mark Holden as Roy Freeman
- Scott Heindl as Steve Spizak
- Alex Zahara as Tommy Meeker
- Alvin Sanders as Harris
- Cindy Maines as Female Teller
- Karin Konoval as Dr. Alvarez
- Christina Jastrzembska as Farm Woman
- Chief Leonard George as Chief Samson Redcloud
