= I Witness =

- DVD cover
- Directed by: Rowdy Herrington
- Written by: Colin Greene & Robert Ozn
- Produced by: David Bixler; Art Linson; Shelly Strong
- Starring: Jeff Daniels; James Spader; Portia de Rossi; Clifton Collins, Jr. Wade Williams
- Cinematography: Donald McAlpine
- Edited by: Pasquale Buba
- Music by: David Kitay
- Distributed by: Universal Pictures
- Release dates: 2003 (International); 2007 (Domestic)
- Language: English

I Witness is a 2003 American action thriller film directed by Rowdy Herrington, starring Jeff Daniels, James Spader, Portia de Rossi, Clifton Collins Jr. and Wade Williams. Released in the United States on February 1, 2003, and re-released by Universal in 2007.

== Plot ==
On his last assignment prior to resigning, burned out human rights activist James Rhodes arrives in Tijuana to help oversee local union elections, which are occurring in a chemical factory built by a US corporation, an election tainted with violence.

While there, he becomes embroiled in the investigation of a mass murder in what appears to be a drug runners' tunnel on the Tijuana/San Diego border, which was casually discovered. He teams up with a local honest street cop and a US official all under the watchful eye of State Department attache, eager to pin the killings on a drug cartel. But when Rhodes links the human rights atrocity to the murder of two American teenage dirt bikers and discovers they all have been poisoned with chemicals, he uncovers a web of corruption between the US corporation, who owns the factory, and the local police, only to realize that he himself has become a dangerous liability to those who pull the puppet strings on one of the world's most dangerous borders.

Now he has to solve the murders before becoming the next victim.

== Cast ==
- Jeff Daniels as James Rhodes
- James Spader as Douglas Draper
- Portia de Rossi as Emily Thompson
- Clifton Collins, Jr. as Claudio Castillo
- Wade Williams as Roy Logan
- Jordi Caballero as Captain Madrid
- Pablo Cunqueiro as Father Perez

== History ==
Originally entitled "God's Witness," the script is by Colin Greene and synthpop musician Robert Ozn.
