= The Cloud (Star Trek: Voyager) =

- Star Trek: Voyager episode
- Episode no.: Season 1 Episode 6
- Directed by: David Livingston
- Story by: Brannon Braga
- Teleplay by: Tom Szollosi; Michael Piller
- Production code: 106
- Original air date: February 13, 1995

Guest appearances
- Luigi Amodeo – The Gigolo; Angela Dohrmann – Ricky; Judy Geeson – Sandrine; Larry Hankin – Gaunt Gary

Episode chronology
← Previous "Phage"	Next → "Eye of the Needle"
- Star Trek: Voyager season 1

"The Cloud" is the sixth episode of the television series Star Trek: Voyager. The teleplay was written by Tom Szolosi and Michael Piller, based on a story by Brannon Braga, and directed by David Livingston.

The USS Voyager spacecraft continues to search for supplies in the Delta Quadrant.

In this episode, Captain Janeway says: "There's coffee in that nebula" - a line an astronaut tweeted from the International Space Station in 2015.

This episode aired on UPN on February 13, 1995.

== Plot ==
Captain Janeway's log states that several weeks have passed and the crew have become more like an "extended family". Neelix has been serving his special recipes to the crew, to help save replicator power, but Janeway has been cut off from her regular coffee and Neelix's alternative is unpalatable. After encountering a strange nebula with signs of omicron particles, which could supplement their rapidly depleting energy reserves, Janeway orders the ship to go into the nebula. En route, Janeway and Chakotay discuss the lack of a ship's counselor and the effect it could have on morale. As the ship goes through the cloud, it comes across a natural energy barrier keeping them 7000 km from the particles they need. Tom Paris engages thrusters to breach the barrier, which closes behind them.

As the ship enters further into the nebula, it encounters trouble: the shields begin to drop in power, reserves begin to fade, and the impulse drive triggers a dangerous reaction. Voyager leaves the nebula immediately, but now must use a photon torpedo to breach the barrier. The ship has sustained damage, and unidentified material from the nebula is attached to the hull. B'Elanna Torres and the Doctor investigate the material and discover that it is organic. They now realize that the nebula is in fact a living organism, and that by breaching the barrier they injured it.

The crew find a way to heal the nebula: the Doctor points out that it has a regenerative power, so they need only be a helping hand. Janeway takes Voyager back inside to repair the damage done in the first encounter. Torres attempts to modify the engines to produce a suitable beam of energy, though the ship is more depleted than before. As they enter, the natural defenses of the nebula attack the ship more intensely, lodging it deeper and further from the wound. Chakotay finds a flow of energy in the nebula and believes it is a circulatory system. The ship reaches the injury using the flow, initiates the repair, and leaves as it heals.

In side stories, Neelix appoints himself the ship's morale officer; Janeway receives help from Chakotay in finding her animal guide from Native American folklore; and Tom Paris takes Kim to "Chez Sandrine", a French bistro he frequented on Earth that he has recreated in the holodeck. After the mission, Janeway and other crew members relax at Chez Sandrine.

== Reception ==
Reviewers Lance Parkin and Mark Jones said the episode was "almost ridiculously straightforward and predictable".

In 2017, ScreenRant ranked "The Cloud" as the tenth most hopeful episode of all Star Trek episodes up to that time, and said it was the source of Captain Janeway's line: "There is coffee in that nebula".

In 2017, Den of Geek said that the episode was dull and is one of the reasons "why Voyager isn’t everyone’s favourite".

In 2020 Tor rated the episode six out of ten and said it had comedic performances by Robert Picardo (as the EMH) as well as the introduction of the holographic French bar, Sandrine's.

== Video releases ==
This episode was released on LaserDisc in Germany in 1996, paired with "Phage" for 49 DEM. 1st Season vol.3 included "Phage" with the German language title Transplantationen and "The Cloud" as Der Mysteriöse Nebel on a single double sided 12" LaserDisc, with a German audio Dolby Surround soundtrack.

== Astronaut connection ==
In 2015, astronaut Samantha Cristoforetti tweeted the line from this episode about coffee from the International Space Station, accompanied by an image of her wearing a Star Trek uniform. The station was getting a shipment of supplies including coffee in an incoming Dragon cargo spacecraft. The spacecraft carried the ISSpresso machine which would allow coffee beverages to be made aboard the Space Station. The tweet was accompanied by her wearing a Star Trek uniform.

Cristoforetti was the first Italian woman in space and broke records with nearly 200 days in space; she was awarded the Ordine al merito della Repubblica Italiana.
