= Amexica (film) =

- Promotional poster
- Directed by: Ronald Krauss
- Written by: Ronald Krauss
- Produced by: Ronald Krauss
- Starring: AnnaLynne McCord; Joseph Ferrante; Jordan James; Kelly Wing
- Cinematography: Jason Lehel
- Edited by: Mark Sult
- Music by: Assaf Rinde
- Release date: 2010
- Running time: 25 minutes
- Country: United States
- Languages: Spanish; English

Amexica is a 2010 American short film written and directed by Ronald Krauss and starring Joseph Ferrante, AnnaLynne McCord and Kelly Wing. It has won "Best Short Film" at such festivals as the Palm Springs International Festival of Short Films, Mexico International Film Festival, the Hawaii International Film Festival in Honolulu, Malibu International Film Festival, and The Beijing International Film Festival.

== Premise ==
A couple of con artists buy a young boy from a child trafficking ring and use him for a get-rich scheme in a series of false roads accidents.

== Cast ==
- Joseph Ferrante as Man
- AnnaLynne McCord as Woman
- Jordan James as Boy
- Gloria Sandoval as El Pastor
- Bernadette Wysocki as Accident Victim #1
- Cary Joseph as Doctor
- David Schroeder as Accident Victim #2
- Yasmine Nickle as Girl with doll
- Andres Salazar as Trafficker
- AJ Anselmo as Boy in warehouse
- Alexa Gardner as Girl in warehouse
- Hannah Taylor Greene as Child at playground
- Bonnie Hellman as Waitress
- Jenny M. Rich as Receptionist
- Evan Lake Schelton as Child at playground
- Kelly Wing as Entrepreneur
- Ronnie Flynn as Ronald
