= Gimme Shelter (2013 film) =

Film by Ronald Krauss

- Theatrical release poster
- Directed by: Ronald Krauss
- Written by: Ronald Krauss
- Produced by: Ronald Krauss; Jeff Rice
- Starring: Vanessa Hudgens; James Earl Jones; Rosario Dawson; Stéphanie Szostak; Emily Meade; Ann Dowd; Brendan Fraser
- Cinematography: Eric Steven Kirkland
- Edited by: Marie-Hélène Dozo; Mark Sult
- Music by: Ólafur Arnalds
- Production company: Day 28 Films
- Distributed by: Roadside Attractions
- Release dates: October 17, 2013 (Heartland Film Festival); January 24, 2014 (United States)
- Running time: 101 minutes
- Country: United States
- Language: English
- Box office: $1.3 million

Gimme Shelter is a 2013 American independent Christian drama film written and directed by Ronald Krauss and starring Vanessa Hudgens, James Earl Jones, Rosario Dawson, Stéphanie Szostak, Emily Meade, Ann Dowd, and Brendan Fraser. The film is based on a true story about a runaway teenage girl who becomes pregnant and is placed in a home for pregnant girls. It was released at the Heartland Film Festival on October 17, 2013, and later in the United States on January 24, 2014.

== Plot ==
Agnes "Apple" Bailey has never had an easy life. She has been in and out of foster care for years, and her mother, June, is an abusive drug addict who only wants her for the welfare money she provides. She decides to run away and go in search of her absent father Tom Fitzpatrick who she discovers is now a wealthy Wall Street broker with a family. Tom agrees to take her in, but she is quickly forced out again when he and his wife learn she is pregnant, and do not agree with her decision to keep the baby.

When a pimp forces her into his vehicle to discuss "business", thinking that she is someone else, Apple jumps into the driver's seat, speeds away and crashes the car. Apple awakes in a hospital where a priest, Father Frank McCarthy, is waiting to speak with her. Her mother shows up at the hospital with a social worker and has a moment of genuine emotion with Apple, but overall is mainly trying to convince her to come back for the benefits she and the baby will receive. Apple goes back and apologizes to Father McCarthy. After gaining her trust, Father McCarthy arranges for her to stay in a home for pregnant teenage girls. The shelter is run by a formerly homeless woman, Kathy. June is informed that Apple will be staying there, and she goes to the shelter in an attempt to take her to her home, but is forced to leave after she gets violent.

Apple bonds with the other girls at the shelter, beginning to open up and trust them. She gives birth to a baby girl and names her Hope. Tom comes to visit and the two reconcile. He offers to let Apple and Hope come live with him, but as they are leaving, Apple realizes she has already made a home for herself at the shelter and decides to stay.

== Cast ==
- Vanessa Hudgens as Agnes "Apple" Bailey
- James Earl Jones as Father McCarthy
- Rosario Dawson as June Bailey
- Stéphanie Szostak as Joanna Fitzpatrick
- Emily Meade as Cassandra
- Ann Dowd as Kathy
- Brendan Fraser as Tom Fitzpatrick
- Dascha Polanco as Carmel

== Production ==
The film was filmed in New York, and New Jersey. Filming started June 9, 2011.

Before the film, director Ronald Krauss had spent a year documenting the stories of girls who were coming in the Several Sources Shelter founded by Kathy DiFlore, and grew to know DiFiore, the shelter, and the two girls Apple Bailey is based on. The film was shot in the home of Kathy DiFiore and the original Several Sources Shelter.

Discussing why her role as Apple's drug-addicted mother June had special meaning for her, Rosario Dawson said, "My mom had me when she was 17. I grew up in a squat in the Lower East Side, and the dropout rate and teen pregnancy rate in my hood was very high. Luckily, my mom had some support and was a good role model. She told me I could be anything I wanted to be. But not everybody gets a happy ending. Some people make some bad choices, and they never, ever recover from them.”

Brendan Fraser and James Earl Jones donated their salaries to the real-life shelters (Several Sources Shelters) portrayed in the film.

== Reception ==
On the review aggregator website Rotten Tomatoes, 27% of 75 critics' reviews are positive, with an average rating of 4.8/10. The website's consensus reads: "In spite of its obvious good intentions — and the compelling true story that inspired it — the heavy-handed Gimme Shelter can't overcome its cliche-riddled script." Metacritic, which uses a weighted average, assigned the film a score of 37 out of 100, based on 29 critics, indicating "generally unfavorable" reviews.

On RogerEbert.com, critic Sheila O'Malley rated the film 2-1/2 stars out of 4, saying the "scenes between Dawson and Hudgens vibrate with pain and ugliness. The script is often obvious, with all feelings laid out too cleanly, but both actresses still manage to create a jagged relationship based on their characters' codependence and shared traumas. One of the film's strengths is its portrayal of the 'system' and what it does to abused children, and the layers of bureaucracy that make it hard to bring about meaningful change in people's lives." Michael O'Sullivan of The Washington Post praised Hudgens for showing "great conviction" in her role's physical transformation to capture the "character's vulnerability" and Dowd for giving an "unvarnished performance" as Kathy DiFiore, but felt that Krauss' scripting "attempts at wringing drama out of real life are more strenuous than is strictly necessary", concluding that: "It's not the only time "Gimme Shelter" doesn't trust the power of its own story — and the truth of its acting — to deliver the point." Betsy Sharkey of the Los Angeles Times criticized Krauss for writing a predictable plot with "hackneyed moments" and "many missed opportunities to bring some real meaning" to the movie, but gave praise to Hudgens for making a "surprisingly affecting turn" in her role, saying, "[T]here are moments of vulnerability and indecision in her performance that begin to illuminate the serious issues facing kids in such straits. Those moments are fleeting. What sticks in the sense that the actress is on her way to making a mark." Rolling Stone's Peter Travers commended Hudgens' performance for being "a decent try at authenticity", but criticized Krauss for crafting the film around her by using cornball clichés with "a broad Hollywood brush", concluding that "Gimme Shelter appears hijacked by the Christian right. Propaganda is a bitch to act. And this misguided movie leaves Hudgens buried in it."
