= Juliana Donald =

American actress (born 1964)

Julianna Donald
- Born: January 1, 1964 (age 62); Washington, D.C., U.S.
- Occupations: Actress; jewellery designer
- Years active: 1984–2018
- Known for: The Muppets Take Manhattan; A Matter of Perspective; The Purple Rose of Cairo; Prophet Motive

Juliana Donald (born January 1, 1964) is an American film and television actress and jewellery designer.

She was born in Washington, D.C. She played "Jenny" in the 1984 Jim Henson movie The Muppets Take Manhattan, her feature film debut. She later appeared in such films as The Purple Rose of Cairo, Dragnet, and Brain Donors. She has appeared on television in Riptide, The Law and Harry McGraw, Star Trek: The Next Generation, Star Trek: Deep Space Nine, Melrose Place, NYPD Blue, Babylon 5, The X-Files and Close to Home, as well as doing voiceover work on animated films. Her most recent film was in the 2005 movie One More Round.

== Filmography ==
=== Animation ===
Year	Title	Role	Notes
1979	The Castle of Cagliostro	Hostess	Streamline Pictures, Credited as Julie Donald
1987	Dirty Pair OVA	Secretary	Credited as Julie Donald
1987	Dirty Pair: Project Eden	Secretary	Credited as Julie Donald
1988	Cyber Ninja	Princess Saki	
1991	3x3 Eyes	Additional Voices	Manga Entertainment, Credited as Julie Donald
1991	Silent Möbius	Yuki Saiko	Streamline Pictures, Credited as Julie Donald
1991	Zeiram	Bartender	
1992	Babel II: Perfect Collection	Additional Voices	
1994	Crimson Wolf	Walla	

=== Films ===
Year	Title	Role	Notes
1984	The Muppets Take Manhattan	Jenny	
1985	The Purple Rose of Cairo	Usherette	
1987	Dragnet	Zookeeper	Credited as Julie Donald
1992	Brain Donors	Lisa Le Baron	Credited as Juli Donald
1995	Midnight Man	Lily Gray	Credited as Julie Donald
1998	A Civil Action	Reporter	Credited as Julie Donald
2005	One More Round	Hillary	

=== TV ===
Year	Title	Role	Notes
1984	Riptide	Heather Price	1 episode, "Where the Girls Are"
1988	Hotel	Andrea Green	1 episode, "Till Death Do Us Part", Credited as Julie Donald
1987	The Law and Harry McGraw	E.J. Brunson	16 episodes, Credited as Julie Donald
1988	Superboy	Ellen Jensen	1 episode, "Troubled Waters", Credited as Julie Donald
1989	Murder, She Wrote	Irene Terhune	1 episode, "First Burn, Cauldron Bubble", Credited as Julie Donald
1990	Star Trek: The Next Generation	Tayna	1 episode, "A Matter of Perspective", Credited as Julie Donald
1990	Nightmare on the 13th Floor	Hotel Waitress	TV movie, Credited as Julie Donald
1990	Major Dad	Gail Callaghan	1 episode, "Love on the Run", Credited as Julie Donald
1990	Father Dowling Mysteries	Lucy Aspell	1 episode, "The Vanishing Victim Mystery", Credited as Julie Donald
1991	The Gambler Returns: The Luck of the Draw	Ruby Roy Bean	TV movie, Credited as Julie Donald
1992	Civil Wars	Alicia Mitford	1 episode, "His Honor's Offer", Credited as Juli Donald
1992	Melrose Place	Lily Gray	1 episode, "Drawing the Line", Credited as Julie Donald
1995	Star Trek: Deep Space Nine	Emi	1 episode, "Prophet Motive"
1995	Babylon 5	Pilot #1	1 episode, "The Fall of Night", Credited as Julie Donald
1996	Murder One	Julia Antonelli	6 episodes
1996	The John Larroquette Show	Isabella	1 episode, "Independence Day", Credited as Julie Donald
1996	Chicago Hope	Laura Collings	1 episode, "A Time to Kill"
1999	The X-Files	Nancy Kine	1 episode, "Arcadia"
2000	Walker, Texas Ranger	Sage County D.A. Kristy Clark	1 episode, "Deadly Situation", Credited as Julie Donald
2000	Family Law	Susan	1 episode, "Telling Lies"
2001	Touched by an Angel	Jamie Cadegan	1 episode, "Winners, Losers & Leftovers"
2001	NYPD Blue	Cynthia Bunin	8 episodes
2004	Without a Trace	Rachel Owen	1 episode, "Exposure", Credited as Julianna Donald
2004	Judging Amy	Katherine Adams	1 episode, "Lullaby"
2006	Monk	Madeline Kroger	1 episode, "Mr. Monk Gets a New Shrink", Credited as Julie Donald
2006	7th Heaven	Woman Adopting 5 Children	1 episode, "You Don't Know What You've Got 'Til He's Gone", Credited as Julie Donald
2007	Close to Home	Dr. Rose Stille	1 episode, "Getting In", Credited as Julie Donald
2018	How to Get Away With Murder	Patient	1 episode, "Everything We Did Was for Nothing"

=== Video games ===
Year	Title	Role	Notes
1996	Star Trek: Borg	Shoreham	Credited as Julie Donald
