= Leslie Stefanson =

American actress and sculptor (born 1971)

- Born: May 10, 1971 (age 55); Fargo, North Dakota, U.S.
- Education: Barnard College (BA)
- Occupation: Actress
- Years active: 1994–2003
- Partner: James Spader (2002–present)
- Children: 1
- Website: lesliestefanson.com

Leslie Stefanson (born May 10, 1971) is a former American actress and sculptor. She is most known for playing the title role as Capt. Elisabeth Campbell in the film The General's Daughter, and Joan Bennett Kennedy in the television miniseries Jackie, Ethel, Joan: The Women of Camelot. Her sculpture, La Bestia, won the top prize from the National Sculpture Society in 2019.

== Biography ==
Stefanson was born in Fargo, North Dakota in 1971, and raised in Moorhead, Minnesota, the youngest of three girls. Her father, Randy Gustafson, was a lawyer while her mother, Corinne, operated a clothing store. She is of Icelandic heritage, with her paternal grandparents, Skúli Stefánsson and Heffie Einarson, emigrating from Iceland. She studied literature in New Jersey at Drew University and in New York City at Columbia University. In 1993, she graduated with a degree in English literature from Barnard College. She was a member of a New York theater group, modeled, and appeared in an advertisement for Lee's Jeans in 1997, which was shown during the Super Bowl.

In August 2008, Stefanson gave birth to her first child, a son, with actor James Spader.

As of 2024, she makes bronze and terracotta sculptures in New York City.

== Filmography ==
Year	Title	Role	Notes
1994	The Cowboy Way	Girl At Party	
1996	The Mirror Has Two Faces	Sara Myers	
1997	Fool's Paradise	Elizabeth "Liz"	
1997	Flubber	Sylvia, Weebo's Hologram	
1997	As Good as It Gets	Cafe 24 Waitress	
1998	Delivered	Claire Moore	
1998	An Alan Smithee Film: Burn Hollywood Burn	Michelle Rafferty	
1998	Break Up	Shelly	
1999	The General's Daughter	Captain Elisabeth Campbell	
2000	Beautiful	Joyce Parkins	
2000	Unbreakable	Kelly	
2001	The Stickup	Natalie Wright	
2001	Jackie, Ethel, Joan: The Women of Camelot	Joan Bennett Kennedy	TV miniseries
2002	Desert Saints	FBI Agent Donna Marbury	
2002	MDs	Shelly Pangborn	10 episodes
2003	The Hunted	Irene Kravitz	
2003	Alien Hunter	Nyla Olson	
2019	Glass	Kelly	Archival footage from Unbreakable
