= Ex Post Facto (Star Trek: Voyager) =

- Star Trek: Voyager episode
- Episode no.: Season 1 Episode 8
- Directed by: LeVar Burton
- Story by: Evan Carlos Somers
- Teleplay by: Michael Piller; Evan Carlos Somers
- Production code: 108
- Original air date: February 27, 1995

Guest appearances
- Henry Brown - Numiri Captain; Francis Guinan - Minister Kray; Aaron Lustig - Doctor; Robin McKee - Lidell Ren; Ray Reinhardt - Tolen Ren

Episode chronology
← Previous "Eye of the Needle"	Next → "Emanations"
- Star Trek: Voyager season 1

"Ex Post Facto" is the eighth episode of Star Trek: Voyager. In this science fiction television show episode, the 24th century spaceship USS Voyager is trying to make its way back to Earth, after being stranded on the other side of the Galaxy. In this episode, one of its crew, Tom Paris, is convicted of murder by aliens.

This episode aired on UPN on February 27, 1995.

== Plot ==
While on a visit to the home planet of the Baneans, Lieutenant Tom Paris is convicted of the murder of engineering physicist Tolen Ren. As punishment, he must relive Ren's last moments every 14 hours. As Ren's memory plays back in Paris's mind, he sees himself with Ren's wife before stabbing Ren in his living room.

Voyager discover Paris's fate after Ensign Harry Kim returns to the ship. Kim relates that Ren was helping him and Paris with a damaged piece of equipment, and invited them for dinner at his house. While there, Paris got bored and spent some time with Tolen's wife Lidell Ren. Soon after, Tolen was stabbed to death in his living room in front of Lidell. Paris was arrested and Kim forced to leave without him.

Voyager heads to the Banean homeworld and soon arrives despite encountering the Numiri, another space-faring race the Baneans are at war with. The Baneans allow Captain Kathryn Janeway to see Paris, who denies killing Tolen even though he did spend some time with Lidell. Immediately afterward, Paris relives Ren's memory once again and loses consciousness. The Voyager crew finds Paris suffering ill effects of the treatment, and the Banean minister allows them to return Paris to the ship for medical care, on the advice of the Banean doctor who implanted Ren's memory into Paris.

Soon after, Voyager's Chief of Security Tuvok begins investigating the murder. He decides he must perform a mind meld with Paris to witness Ren's memories. As he experiences the memory for himself, Tuvok notices alien writing overplayed on top of the visions. From the memories, Tuvok establishes that Paris is innocent, recognizing that the height difference between Paris and Lidell in the memory is different from reality, and the murderer must have been familiar with Banean anatomy to kill Ren with a single stab. Tuvok reveals the strange glyphs in the video are confidential technical information important to the Banean war effort against the Numiri. The Banean doctor, who is Lidell's lover, has altered the memory implants to implicate Paris and use him as a means of smuggling data to the Numiri attackers. Lidell and the doctor are arrested by the Banean authorities, and the memory implanted into Paris is removed.

== Director ==
This is the first of eight episodes that LeVar Burton directed, across the seven seasons of Star Trek: Voyager. He had first joined the Star Trek franchise when he played Geordi La Forge in the series Star Trek: The Next Generation, and reprised that role in the Star Trek: Voyager episode "Timeless", which he also directed. Burton directed 28 episodes of Star Trek television, over the period 1993 to 2005, including for Star Trek: The Next Generation, Star Trek: Deep Space Nine, Star Trek: Voyager and Star Trek: Enterprise.

== Production ==
This episode was filmed at Paramount Studios in Los Angeles, California.

== Reception ==
The episode has some similarities with the earlier Star Trek: The Next Generation episode "A Matter of Perspective" and the later Star Trek: Deep Space Nine episode "Hard Time". In 2020, The Digital Fix felt this episode copied "A Matter of Perspective", but did help establish the character Tom Paris in the first season.

This episode is also noted for the Star Trek Vulcan "mind meld" between the characters Tuvok and Tom Paris. In this alien procedure, their two minds are connected, and it's noted how this is a plot device that advances the final stages of the story. The show is noted among Star Trek episodes, along with "Hard Time", as an example where the manipulation of a person's memories is used as punishment for a crime.
