= Rave (film) =

- Directed by: Ronald Krauss
- Written by: Ronald Krauss; Mario Zavala; Oona Croese (as Kristine A. Tata)
- Produced by: Michael Kolko; Ronald Krauss; Ilan Lewinger
- Starring: Douglas Spain; Aimee Graham; Nicholle Tom; Tamara Mello; Efren Ramirez
- Cinematography: Mario Zavala
- Edited by: Don Pollard
- Music by: Jeffrey R. Gund
- Production company: Twelve Corners Entertainment
- Distributed by: Lightyear Entertainment
- Release date: September 22, 2000 (Woodstock Film Festival)
- Running time: 90 minutes
- Country: United States
- Language: English

Rave is a 2000 American drama film written and directed by Ronald Krauss and starring Douglas Spain, Aimee Graham, Nicholle Tom, Tamara Mello, and Efren Ramirez.

== Premise ==
On a Saturday night in downtown Los Angeles, several teenagers converge at a rave. The teens range from Daffy, an upstanding Mexican-American from a good home; Jay Hoon, a Korean-American teen who defies his strict father; JP and his friend Lazy; and Sadie, Mary, and Tracy the group of rich girls. In a day, we see a portrait of these teenagers finding their way through all the attractions and dangers of the wild underbelly of Los Angeles.

== Cast ==
- Douglas Spain as Daffy
- Aimee Graham as Mary Griffith
- Nicholle Tom as Sadie
- Tamara Mello as Nette
- Efren Ramirez as Bookie
- Dante Basco as Jay Hoon
- Franco Vega as JP
- Shaun Weiss as Lazy
- Lela Lee as Lisa
- Steven Bauer as Antonio
- Tricia Dickson as Tracy
- Scott Torrence as Brian aka Amanda
- Chris Weber as Sky

== Reception ==
Dennis Harvey of Variety gave the film a negative review, citing its clichéd, by-the-numbers plotlines. He wrote, "No more imaginative than its title, indie feature exploits a rave as colorful background for retrograde troubled-youth dramatics that pile on one alarmist cliche — drug O.D., drive-by shooting, Parents Who Don’t Love Enough, etc. — after another to absolutely no credible effect." Harvey concluded "Most real-life teens, not to mention ravers, will find Rave absurdly condescending and exploitative."

Marc Savlov of The Austin Chronicle wrote, "The acting and technique (not to mention a rousing credit sequence) are uniformly good, but viewers familiar with the rave scene may come away feeling as if they've just been hit over the head with an American Family Association two-by-four. Peace, love, unity, and respect may be the bywords of rave culture, but Krauss' film plays more like a dreary ABC After-School Special in which common teenage quandaries result in death or worse, and your friendly neighborhood E dealer is a psycho killer."

== See also ==
- Groove, a film about rave culture released in the same year
