= A Matter of Perspective =

- Star Trek: The Next Generation episode
- Episode no.: Season 3 Episode 14
- Directed by: Cliff Bole
- Written by: Ed Zuckerman
- Cinematography by: Marvin Rush
- Production code: 162
- Original air date: February 12, 1990

Guest appearances
- Colm Meaney as Miles O'Brien; Craig Richard Nelson as Krag; Mark Margolis as Nel Apgar; Gina Hecht as Manua Apgar; Juliana Donald as Tayna; Majel Barrett as Computer Voice

Episode chronology
← Previous "Deja Q"	Next → "Yesterday's Enterprise"
- Star Trek: The Next Generation season 3

"A Matter of Perspective" is the 14th episode of the third season of the American syndicated science fiction television series Star Trek: The Next Generation (TNG), and the 62nd episode of the series overall. It was inspired by Akira Kurosawa's 1950 film Rashomon. The 45-minute episode was broadcast on February 12, 1990 on television. It was written by Ed Zuckerman.

Set in the 24th century, the series follows the adventures of the Starfleet crew of the Federation starship Enterprise-D. In this episode, Commander Riker is accused of murdering a scientist and faces an extradition hearing aboard the Enterprise, where everyone's version of what transpired is re-created in the holodeck. Meanwhile, the ship is damaged by a mysterious radiation that the rest of crew works to resolve.

The episode involves themes of subjectivity in perception and memory, as well as the principle of presumed innocence in legal proceedings. This follows in the tradition of Star Trek episodes that examine law and justice.

== Plot ==
With a routine planetary survey ahead, the Federation starship Enterprise drops Commander Riker (Jonathan Frakes) and Chief Engineer La Forge (LeVar Burton) at the Botanica Four research space station orbiting Tanuga Four to check on the progress of the work of Dr. Nel Apgar (Mark Margolis), a Tanugan who has been working on Krieger waves, a new promised energy source for the Federation. When the Enterprise returns, Captain Picard (Patrick Stewart) is told that Riker stayed behind to have a private meeting with Apgar, and moments after Riker transports back to the ship, the station explodes, killing Apgar, and almost killing Riker due to the explosion disrupting the transporter process. Tanugan investigator Krag (Craig Richard Nelson) comes aboard to accuse Riker of murder; under Tanugan law, Riker is guilty until proven innocent, and Krag demands Riker's extradition. Captain Picard requests that they hold a hearing aboard the Enterprise to determine Riker's guilt. This involves the use of a holodeck, recreating the events on the station from data logs and testimony from Riker, Dr. Apgar's wife Manua (Gina Hecht) and his research assistant Tayna (Juliana Donald).

In the holodeck recreation, Krag demonstrates that a directed energy beam – from Riker's location prior to transport – struck the Krieger wave converter, destroying it and the station, but his theory is that Riker fired a phaser just before beaming out. Riker presents his case first, with his simulation showing Apgar highly agitated with a Federation presence before he is ready for them, and Manua openly flirting with Riker. Manua then makes aggressive passes at Riker in the guest quarters when Apgar walks in on them, attempts to attack Riker, but Riker subdues him. Apgar leaves with Manua giving Riker a veiled threat. Riker's simulation concludes with his final confrontation where Apgar tells Riker that he will lodge a formal complaint about Riker's behavior and accuses Riker of potentially damaging the project with baseless information in Riker's progress report.

In Manua's version of the events, she is a doting wife, with her husband promising rich rewards coming from the project. From her point of view, Riker is the one making the advances, and when they are alone in the guest quarters, Riker threatens to rape her when her husband storms in to defend her, but Riker overpowers him and threatens to have the project shut down. During a recess, Riker asserts to Counselor Troi (Marina Sirtis) that he never assaulted Manua, and Troi believes him, but she tells him that Manua believes the events happened as described, and that "it is the truth as each of you remembers it".

Tayna's testimony is her version of events from Apgar's point of view as he told her. Picard tries to have the testimony dismissed as hearsay, however, Tanugan law allows such testimony, so they proceed. In her simulation, when Apgar walks in on Riker and Manua, Apgar is the one to successfully subdue Riker, leaving Riker threatening to kill Apgar. Based on the testimonies presented, Picard is not sure Riker's case is strong enough to avoid extradition.

Meanwhile, the crew of the Enterprise find highly focused pulses of an unknown, intense radiation striking parts of the ship, putting holes through the bulkheads. La Forge fears what would happen if this should occur inside the warp reactor. The initial assessment is that the only commonality is the timing of these events, which upon further examination they soon trace to be precisely in time with the wave generator on the surface, which had remained operating after the station's destruction. Picard comes to realize the truth, and prepares a new simulation on the holodeck.

With Krag, Manua, Tayna and Riker all present, Picard demonstrates through a combination of the testimonies that Apgar was more interested in the potential financial success of completing the Krieger wave converter; he would not get this through the Federation, and Picard postulates that he in fact was trying to weaponize the project to make money, thus explaining his hostility towards Riker's presence. Further, Picard suggests that Apgar had successfully built the converter; the holodeck simulation of it, also being fully functional, has been focusing the energy from the generator on the planet, resulting in the damaging radiation experienced on the ship, which La Forge identified as Krieger waves. Picard completes his explanation by running the holodeck simulation of the moment of Riker's transport, synchronized with the planetary generator – the holodeck simulation shows that Apgar had aimed the Krieger wave generator at Riker, but when the energy beam struck him, the beam bounced off the transporter field and hit the converter, destroying it and the station. Krag agrees with the conclusion that Apgar accidentally killed himself and Riker is exonerated.

== Production ==
Guest star Juliana Donald, who played the character Tayna (Apgar's assistant), said in an interview the most difficult part of playing the role of Tayna in "A Matter of Perspective" was how stoic the character was, which meant relating the character's internal emotions more subtly. To be selected for the role of Tayna, she had to audition many times. The audition group for cast included the producer, director, and writers. Donald had further appearances in the Star Trek franchise, as different characters, in the Star Trek: Deep Space Nine episode "Prophet Motive" and in the video game Star Trek: Borg.

"A Matter of Perspective" was directed by Cliff Bole, who also directed 25 other Star Trek: The Next Generation episodes. David Krieger was the science advisor for this episode, and the episode's plot element technology is named after him.

The space station design model in the show is from the feature films Star Trek II: The Wrath of Khan and Star Trek: The Motion Picture.

== Broadcast and release ==
The episode was aired on broadcast television on February 12, 1990.

This was released in Japan on LaserDisc on July 5, 1996, in the half season set Log. 5: Third Season Part. 1 by CIC Video. This included episodes up to "A Matter of Perspective" on 12-inch double sided optical discs. The video was in NTSC format with both English and Japanese audio tracks.

"A Matter of Perspective" was released on VHS (video tape cassette) on May 23, 1995. This was a release as a single episode on the tape. The episode was released with Star Trek: The Next Generation season three DVD box set, released in the United States on July 2, 2002. This had 26 episodes of Season 3 on seven discs, with a Dolby Digital 5.1 audio track. It was released in high-definition Blu-ray in the United States on April 30, 2013.

An example of a streaming release was in 2015 the remastered HD version came to the streaming video service Netflix.

== Reception ==
In a review of this episode in 2010 by The A.V. Club, they noted the humour of Data's commentary on Picard's painting, and overall rated the episode a B−. They also suggested that the episode would have been better if another character had played the role Riker was in.

== Notes ==
- The episode's theme is derived from the 1950 Japanese film Rashomon.
- This episode is similar to Star Trek: The Original Series episodes "Court Martial" and "Wolf in the Fold".
- This episode also has some similarities to Star Trek: Voyager episode "Ex Post Facto" (S1,E8)
