= Rowdy Herrington =

American film director

Rowdy L. Herrington
- Born: 1951 (age 74–75); Pittsburgh, Pennsylvania, U.S.
- Education: Penn State University
- Occupations: Film director, writer
- Known for: Road House
- Spouse: Toni Semple

Rowdy L. Herrington (born 1951 in Pittsburgh, Pennsylvania) is a Hollywood director and writer currently residing in Livingston, Montana. He is married and has no children.

== Career ==
Rowdy attended Penn State from 1969 to 1973 and majored in television production. After college, Rowdy worked at WQED (TV) for two years in a number of production roles. He has, in total, worked fourteen years in television.

== Filmography ==
Year	Title	Director	Writer
1988	Jack's Back	Yes	Yes
1989	Road House	Yes	No
1992	Gladiator	Yes	No
1993	Striking Distance	Yes	Yes
1998	A Murder of Crows	Yes	Yes
2002	The Stickup	Yes	Yes
2003	I Witness	Yes	No
2004	Bobby Jones: Stroke of Genius	Yes	Yes
2025	Looking Through Water *	No	Yes

* Also credited as co-producer

Electrician

- H.O.T.S. (1979)
- Humanoids from the Deep (1980)

Grip

- Repo Man (1984)

Best boy electric

- Maria's Lovers (1984)
- A Nightmare on Elm Street (1984)

Gaffer

- That's Life! (1986)
- Native Son (1986)
- Shy People (1987)
- Nightflyers (1987)
