= Joel Polis =

American actor

- Born: October 3, 1951 (age 74); Philadelphia, Pennsylvania, U.S.
- Education: University of Southern California (BA); Yale University (MFA)
- Occupation: Actor
- Years active: 1982–present

Joel Polis (born October 3, 1951) is an American television, film and stage actor.

Polis has appeared in over one hundred television programs and films during his career.

== Career ==
Polis' first film role was the character Fuchs in the 1982 science fiction film The Thing. He appeared in numerous television series including Cheers, Alien Nation, Northern Exposure, Star Trek: Voyager, Roseanne, Seinfeld, Chicago Hope, Boston Legal and CSI. He appeared in a recurring role on the television series Cheers as the mischievous Gary, owner of the rival bar, Gary's Olde Towne Tavern.

Polis's theater credits include performances at the Astor Place Theatre, Hartford Stage, Old Globe Theater, South Coast Repertory, Mark Taper Forum, Odyssey Theatre, Laguna Playhouse, Lillian Theater and the Pasadena Playhouse. He was a guest on NCIS

== Filmography ==
=== Film ===
Year	Title	Role	Notes
1982	The Thing	Fuchs	
1983	Born Beautiful	Ted	
1984	Best Defense	First Agent	
1989	True Believer	Dean Rabin	
1990	My Blue Heaven	U.S. Attorney	
1990	The Rookie	Detective Lance	
1992	Fly by Night	Halbein	
1996	It's My Party	Tim Bergen	
1999	Tumbleweeds	Vice Principal	
2000	Attraction	William	
2002	A Light in the Darkness	Corporate Flunkie #1	
2003	Alien Hunter	Copeland	
2006	Fallen Angels	Horace Millhouse	
2015	The Return of Mike and Ike	Bad Guy 1	

=== Television ===
Year	Title	Role	Notes
1983	Remington Steele	Eldon Veckmer	1 episode
1984	St. Elsewhere	Jeff Hassett	1 episode
1984	Fatal Vision	Brian Murtagh	2 episodes
1985	T.J. Hooker	John Jenkins	1 episode
1985	Moonlighting	Frank Harbert	1 episode
1985	Scarecrow and Mrs. King	Eddie Munson	1 episode
1985	Cagney & Lacey	Deputy D.A. Ackerman	1 episode
1985	The Twilight Zone	Dad	1 episode
1985-1990	Cheers	Gary	3 episodes
1985	The Hitchhiker	Carl	1 episode
1985	Misfits of Science	Dwayne / Lonnie	1 episode
1989	Gideon Oliver	Iselin Cort	1 episode
1989	Alien Nation	Carl Peterson / Dr. Edward Windsor	2 episodes
1992	Northern Exposure	Matthew Miller	Episode 43: "Blowing Bubbles"
1993-1994	Home Improvement	Wes Davidson, President of Binford Tools	2 episodes
1995	Star Trek: Voyager	Ny Terla	Episode: "Time and Again"
1997	Seinfeld	Reilly	Episode: "The Comeback"
2009	Bones	Mario Trivisonno	Episode: "The Witch in the Wardrobe"
2010	Cold Case	Steve Burke	Episode: "Almost Paradise"
