= Time and Again (Star Trek: Voyager) =

- Star Trek: Voyager episode
- Episode no.: Season 1 Episode 4
- Directed by: Les Landau
- Story by: David Kemper
- Teleplay by: David Kemper; Michael Piller
- Production code: 104
- Original air date: January 30, 1995

Guest appearances
- Nicolas Surovy as Pe'Nar Makull; Joel Polis as Ny Terla; Brady Bluhm as Latika; Ryan MacDonald as Shopkeeper; Jerry Spicer as Guard; Steve Vaught as Officer

Episode chronology
← Previous "Parallax"	Next → "Phage"
- Star Trek: Voyager season 1

"Time and Again" is the fourth episode of the science fiction television series Star Trek: Voyager.

Voyager, commanded by Captain Janeway, is hit by a shock wave come from a nearby solar system, and goes to investigate. On arrival they trace the origin of the wave and beam down an away team to a planet devastated by a terrible expolsion.

This episode aired on UPN on January 30, 1995.

== Production ==
Scenes in this episode were filmed at Tillman Water Reclamation Plant in California, which has been a popular shooting location for the Star Trek franchise.

== Plot ==
While Lt. Tom Paris is pressuring Ensign Harry Kim to go on a date with the Delaney sisters from stellar cartography, Voyager is hit by a "polaric" detonation from a nearby planet. On arrival, they find the planet's population has been completely wiped out. An away team, including Captain Kathryn Janeway and Lieutenant Tom Paris, transports to the surface and estimates from the ruins that the explosion only happened a day earlier. Signs of temporal anomalies have been left in its wake. Janeway and Paris become caught in one, finding themselves on the planet the day before the explosion. Quickly integrating themselves into the general population, they learn that the planet's civilization is powered by a volatile form of energy known as "polaric" energy, an option that has been met with some protest. Janeway and Paris become caught up with a group of saboteurs threatening to compromise one of the polaric power plants. Janeway and Paris's strange Starfleet equipment prompt the saboteurs to believe they are infiltrators, so they confiscate the equipment, bring forward their sabotage plan and force Janeway and Paris to accompany them to the power plant.

Meanwhile, a day in the future, Kes's nascent psychic ability allows her to identify that Janeway and Paris have fallen back into the past. The remaining senior Voyager officers develop a method to create a short-lived rift to the past through which they hope to evacuate Janeway and Paris.

The saboteurs use Janeway and Paris as a diversion to allow them access to the polaric plant, during which Paris is shot and wounded. As they begin their sabotage, the Voyager crew initiates the rift. Janeway recognizes that it is the rift which, if not closed, will trigger the detonation that kills all life on the planet. The saboteurs allow Janeway to use her phaser to force the rift to close, changing the future.

Events then return to the start of the episode: Voyager detects the nearby planet, bustling with a pre-warp civilization using polaric energy. Kes appears on the bridge, concerned about a feeling of deja vu, but is relieved to see the planet's civilization is alive and well. In accordance with the Prime Directive, Voyager refrains from communicating with it and continues on its journey home.

== Reception ==
In their book Beyond the Final Frontier: An Unauthorised Review of the Trek Universe on Television and Film, authors Lance Parkin and Mark Jones expressed disappointment at the similarity between this episode and the previous one, "Parallax", which also relies heavily on technobabble and involves a temporal anomaly for which the crew are themselves unwittingly responsible.

Den of Geek recommended the episode in a binge-watching guide focused on time-travel episodes, described it as "by the numbers but perfectly serviceable." In 2017, Netflix listed "Time and Again" among the top ten most re-watched Star Trek episodes on its streaming service.

Tor.com rated the episode five out of ten in 2020. Similarly, Trek Today concluded that the episode "ends up feeling like waste of time and energy".

In 2021, a Screen Rant reviewer complimented the orange-striped outfits but criticized their ubiquity, writing: "When everyone on the entire planet wears the same exact striped, orange shirts? That gets weird", and suggested more costume variety.
