= Beyond the Glory =

- Also known as: Beyond the Game (working title)
- Genre: Documentary
- Written by: Jason Rem; Anthony Storm; Ronald Krauss
- Directed by: Jason Rem; Anthony Storm; Ronald Krauss
- Presented by: Michael Irvin; Michael Moorer
- Narrated by: Jay Mohr; Roy Firestone
- Theme music composer: Stewart Copeland
- Country of origin: United States
- Original language: English
- No. of seasons: 5
- No. of episodes: 53

Production
- Executive producers: Steve Michaels; Frank Sinton
- Production company: Asylum Entertainment

Original release
- Network: Fox Sports Net
- Release: January 7, 2001 – January 1, 2006

Related
- SportsCentury

Beyond the Glory is a documentary series that profiles some of the most legendary and controversial athletes in recent history. Executive produced by Steve Michaels and Frank Sinton and narrated by Jay Mohr, and later by Roy Firestone, the show used stock footage, on-camera interviews, and photographs of the athletes' lives, who grew up.

The series was produced by Asylum Entertainment.

== Athletes ==
The series had delved into the lives of such athletes as Mike Tyson in a special two-hour Emmy-nominated episode, and also conducted in-depth interviews with some sports notables. Athletes profiled include:

- Oksana Baiul
- Charles Barkley
- Jerome Bettis
- Larry Bird
- Manute Bol
- Bobby Bowden
- Jim Brown
- Kobe Bryant
- Bill Buckner
- Vince Carter
- Chris Chelios
- Mark Cuban
- Daunte Culpepper
- Terrell Davis
- Corey Dillon
- Mike Ditka
- Tony Dorsett
- Roberto Durán
- Dale Earnhardt
- Sean Elliott
- Doug Flutie
- George Foreman
- Steve Francis
- Joe Frazier
- Jeff Garcia
- Kevin Garnett
- Tony Hawk
- Grant Hill
- Larry Holmes
- Priest Holmes
- Evander Holyfield
- Bernard Hopkins
- Oscar De La Hoya
- Brett Hull
- Michael Irvin
- Dale Jarrett
- Chipper Jones
- Roy Jones Jr.
- Michael Jordan
- Jackie Joyner-Kersee
- Mike Krzyzewski
- Jim Kelly
- Matt Kenseth
- Anna Kournikova
- Mario Lemieux
- Sugar Ray Leonard
- Carl Lewis
- Lennox Lewis
- Ray Lewis
- Greg Louganis
- Karl Malone
- Sterling Marlin
- Curtis Martin
- Mark Martin
- Denny McLain
- Donovan McNabb
- Reggie Miller
- Warren Moon
- Alonzo Mourning
- Hakeem Olajuwon
- Walter Payton
- Paul Pierce
- Jerry Rice
- Cal Ripken Jr.
- Dennis Rodman
- Pete Rose
- Pete Sampras
- Deion Sanders
- Gary Sheffield
- Ozzie Smith
- Sammy Sosa
- Kordell Stewart
- Lawrence Taylor
- Vinny Testaverde
- Isiah Thomas
- Mike Tyson
- Nick Van Exel
- Rusty Wallace
- Kurt Warner
- Chris Webber
- Reggie White
- Dominique Wilkins
- The Andrettis (Mario, Michael, John, et al.)
- The Buss Family (Jeanie Buss, Dr. Jerry Buss)
- Duke University/University of Kentucky
- The Fab Five (Michigan)
- The Legends of Poker
- The Petty Family (Lee, Richard, Kyle, and Adam)
- U.S. Women's Soccer Team
- The Waltrips (Darrell and Michael)
