= Puppies for Sale =

1998 film by Ronald Krauss

- Theatrical release poster
- Directed by: Ronald Krauss
- Written by: Ronald Krauss; Mario Zavala
- Produced by: Ronald Krauss
- Starring: Jack Lemmon; Jesse James; Harvey Krauss
- Cinematography: Mario Zavala
- Edited by: Howard E. Smith
- Music by: Elmer Bernstein
- Distributed by: Aron Productions
- Release date: April 5, 1998
- Running time: 9 minutes
- Country: United States
- Language: English

Puppies for Sale is a 1998 American short film starring two-time Academy Award winner Jack Lemmon (one of Lemmon's last films) and seven year old Jesse James in his first role. The film's score was composed by Elmer Bernstein. The film's message is that disabilities are no match against the power of love and compassion.

== Plot ==
The short is about a young boy (James), while walking down the street sees a pet shop sign that says “Puppies For Sale”. The boy enters the pet shop owned by Lemmon, to see the puppies. There are five puppies to pick from, one with a congenital hip problem. "That's the puppy I want to buy" exclaims the young boy. Lemmon tries to dissuade the boy from taking the imperfect pup, but the boy insists and gets down on the floor to play with his new pet. The owner gets a surprise - and a lesson.

Puppies for Sale was the first film written, produced, and directed by Ronald Krauss. His goal was to help get people of all ages to take a second look at the needs and feelings of persons with disabilities.

== Cast ==
- Jack Lemmon as Pet Shop Owner
- Jesse James as Young Boy
- Harvey Krauss as Barber

== Honors and awards ==
- Aspen Shortsfest 1998 - Won, Jurdy Award, Best of Category, Children, for "Puppies for Sale" (1998)
- Berlin International Film Festival 1998 - Won, Best Short Film for "Puppies for Sale" (1998)
- Carrousel International du Film 1998 - Won, Camério, Best Short Film for "Puppies for Sale" (1998)
- Giffoni Film Festival 1998 - Won, Bronze Gryphon, Best Short Film, for "Puppies for Sale" (1998)
- Heartland Film Festival 1998 - Won, Crystal Heart Award for "Puppies for Sale" (1998)
- Kodak Vision Award 1998 - Ronald Krauss for "Puppies for Sale" (1998)
- Temecula Valley International Film Festival 1998 - Won, Best Short Film for "Puppies for Sale" (1998)
- Chicago International Children's Film Festival 1999 - Won, Children's Jury Award, Short Film and Video, Live-Action, for "Puppies for Sale" (1998)
- Montevideo Film Festival for Children and Young People 1998 - Won, Best Short Film for "Puppies for Sale" (1998).

Puppies for Sale was awarded "Best Short Film"and was celebrated in over twenty film festivals worldwide including Sundance Film Festival, Cannes Film Festival, The Berlin International Film Festival, Giffoni Film Festival, Aspen Shortsfest, Rimouski International, Montevideo Uruguay, The Heartland Film, Chicago International Film Festival, Cinequest Film Festival, Oberhausen Kurtz Film Festival, Temecula Film Festival, Tokyo International Film Festival, Beijing International Film Festival, American Short Shorts Tokyo, Rio International Film Festival Brazil, New Zealand International Film Festival, BFI London International Film Festival, and many others.

In addition, Krauss was the recipient of the Kodak Vision Award for excellence presented by George Lucas.

Puppies was then theatrically released accompanying the screenings the re-release of Disney's "The Little Mermaid.”

Puppies for Sale also had the highest honor of being exhibited at The National Gallery Museum of Art in Washington D.C.
