= Eye of the Needle (Star Trek: Voyager) =

- Star Trek: Voyager episode
- Episode no.: Season 1 Episode 7
- Directed by: Winrich Kolbe
- Story by: Hilary Bader
- Teleplay by: Bill Dial; Jeri Taylor
- Production code: 107
- Original air date: February 20, 1995

Guest appearances
- Vaughn Armstrong - Telek; Tom Virtue - Baxter

Episode chronology
← Previous "The Cloud"	Next → "Ex Post Facto"
- Star Trek: Voyager season 1

"Eye of the Needle" is the seventh episode of the American science fiction television series Star Trek: Voyager. The screenplay was written by Bill Dial and Jeri Taylor based on a story by Hilary Bader, and it was directed by Winrich Kolbe.

In this episode, Voyager discovers and explores the nature of a wormhole.

This episode aired on UPN on February 20, 1995.

== Plot ==
Voyager detects the signs of a wormhole and changes course to investigate, in the hope that it can be used to shorten Voyager's journey to Earth. To the crew's disappointment, it is a decaying micro-wormhole whose aperture is only about 30 centimetres (12 in) in diameter. Nevertheless, Captain Janeway suspects that it could be used to transmit a message to the Alpha Quadrant, and launches a micro-probe into the wormhole to determine where it exits.

The probe gets stuck in gravitational eddies, and is unable to pass any further. Meanwhile, a vessel at the other end of the wormhole is investigating and making scans of the probe. The crew of Voyager detect the scans and make contact, using the probe as a communications relay. The vessel identifies itself as a Romulan ship in the Alpha Quadrant. Janeway asks the Romulan captain, Telek R'Mor, to relay messages from the crew to their families and Starfleet. At first he refuses, but relents after Janeway asks about his own family, who are far away on Romulus.

Before long, Chief Engineer Torres suggests to Janeway that the probe could be used as a relay not only for communications, but for transporting the crew directly back to the Alpha Quadrant. Tests are conducted and all found successful. The Romulan captain volunteers to transport to Voyager to confirm the safety of transporting a life form, and will arrange for a support vessel to rendezvous and accommodate the Voyager crew. He is then successfully transported to Voyager.

It is then discovered that R'Mor is from 20 years in the past — the micro-wormhole transits through both space and time. The crew are unable to transport back to the Alpha Quadrant for fear of altering history, and similarly the Romulan cannot try to prevent Voyager's fate before it occurs without also altering events. Instead, they decide that R'Mor will deliver the messages in 20 years, after Voyager has left the Alpha Quadrant, thus preserving the timeline.

After R'Mor is beamed back to his ship, Chief of Security Tuvok reveals that, upon researching the computer's data banks, he has discovered that R'Mor died four years before Voyager left the Alpha Quadrant. The crew hope that R'Mor arranged for someone else to deliver them after his death, but are left with no way of knowing for certain.

== Reception ==
Reviewers Lance Parkin and Mark Jones enjoyed the episode, praising its suspense, its twists and its depiction of the crew's frustration at their fate.

Out of the 16 episodes in the first season of Star Trek: Voyager aired in early 1995, "Eye of the Needle" tied "Caretaker" for the highest rated episode on TV.com as of 2018. Both of the episodes had a rating of 8.7 surpassing the next closest which was "State of Flux" which had a rating of 8.5 as of 2018.

In 2015, Den of Geek suggested "Eye of a Needle" for a binge-watching guide that focused on Star Trek: Voyager episodes featuring time travel.

In 2016, Vox rated this one of the top 25 essential episodes of all Star Trek.

In 2017, Den of Geek ranked actor Vaughn Armstrong as the Romulan character Telek R’Mor, as the fifth best guest star on Star Trek: Voyager.

In 2019, Screen Rant ranked the character introduced in this episode, Telek R’mor, as one of the ten most important Romulans of the Star Trek franchise.

In 2019, Higgy Pop noted this episode as one of the time travel stories of the Star Trek franchise.

In 2020, SyFy Wire ranked "Eye of the Needle" the 14th best episode of Star Trek: Voyager; they note that crew is able to make contact with a ship in the Alpha Quadrant but there is a plot twist. Also in 2020, Gizmodo listed this episode as one of the "Must watch" episodes from season one of the show.

In 2020, The Digital Fix said this was the best episode in season one, and praised Vaughn Armstrong's acting. They felt the episode connected the audience with feelings of loss the crew were feeling by being lost in space.

In 2020, io9 listed this as one of the seven "must-watch" episodes of Star Trek: Voyager's first season.

In 2020, Tor.com gave the episode nine out of ten and praised guest star Vaughn Armstrong, who they said delivered a "rounded, complex, fascinating character", as well as Kate Mulgrew and Roxann Dawson's scenes.
