= Quantum singularity =

Type of spacetime singularity in fiction

The term quantum singularity is used to refer to many different phenomena in fiction. They often only approximate a gravitational singularity in the scientific sense in that they are massive, localized distortions of space and time. The name invokes one of the most fundamental problems remaining in modern physics: the difficulty in uniting Einstein's theory of relativity, which includes singularities within its models of black holes, and quantum mechanics. In fact, since according to relativity, singularities, by definition, are infinitely small, and expected to be quantum mechanical by nature, a theory of quantum gravity would be required to describe their behavior. No such theory has yet been formulated.

== Star Trek ==
A Star Trek quantum singularity is a phenomenon of multiple varieties. One such variety appears in the Star Trek: Voyager episode "Parallax" which creates a mirror image along with a temporal distortion. Voyager flies into the singularity after seeing an image of itself inside, and becomes trapped. To escape, the crew uses a shuttle to fire a tachyon beam at the entry point along the event horizon. In the Voyager episode "Hunters", the crew discover a Hirogen relay station almost 100,000 years old, powered by a quantum singularity, which Tom Paris explicitly refers to in this episode as a black hole. The word "tiny" is used to describe the quantum singularity in this case, as about "a centimeter" in diameter, making it relatively large, although it is more likely that the stated diameter instead refers to the singularity's event horizon. In the episode "Scorpion", Species 8472 and the Borg, make use of quantum singularities to travel to and from fluidic space, an extra-galactic realm (and implied parallel universe) housing the former.

Artificial quantum singularities are also used to power Romulan Warbirds as first described in the Star Trek: The Next Generation episode "Face of the Enemy". Additionally, in the Star Trek: Deep Space Nine episode "Visionary", the side effects from such quantum singularities interacting with "delta-series radiation" cause Miles O'Brien to shift through time. Previously, the episode Past Tense had the side effects of a quantum singularity explosion causing the ship's transporter to send people back through time.

== Futurama ==
In the Futurama episode "Love and Rocket", after Bender breaks up with the Planet Express Ship, whom he only dated during this episode, the ship, which took the break-up pretty hard, threatens to fly into a giant quasar. Thus "the power of 10 billion black holes will smush me and Bender together into a beautiful eternal quantum singularity." Bender gets the crew out of the situation by professing his love for the ship, albeit sarcastically, which distracts her long enough for Fry and Leela to disable the ship's logical processes and restore life-support systems.

== Megas XLR ==
In the Megas XLR episode "Battle Royale", the villain Magnanimous threatens to drop Kiva and Jamie into a quantum singularity, which he says is "like a black hole, only portable, and with a cooler name."

== Farscape ==
In the Farscape episode "Back and Back and Back to the Future", a scientist belonging to the Ilanic race develops a quantum singularity ultimate weapon, described essentially as a portable black hole, to be used against their enemies.

== Stargate SG-1 ==
The Supergate, a gigantic Stargate designed by the Ori to allow the intergalactic transport of starships, is made up of 90 smaller pieces assembled using a regular Stargate. Once interconnected, a nearby planet is collapsed into a quantum singularity using a special force field to provide the massive power needed to open a wormhole to the Ori galaxy. Samantha Carter theorizes that the singularity allows a connection to be maintained indefinitely.

The first Ori attempt to create a Supergate in the Milky Way fails, when Vala Mal Doran inserts her Tel'tak into the incomplete ring and prevents the segments from connecting completely. The shockwave from the forming singularity blasts the gate into oblivion. A second Supergate is later successfully built allowing a fleet of Ori motherships passage into the Milky Way. The SGC eventually blocks Ori access to the Supergate by opening a connection from a Pegasus gate powered by a "natural" black hole.

== City of Heroes ==
In the MMORPG City of Heroes, the quantum singularity is the "pet" power a gravity controller attains at level 32. The singularity takes the form of a portable human sized ball of light surrounded by waves of coloured energy that follows its summoner. The singularity has a variety of gravity based attacks.
