= Jack's Back =

1988 film by Rowdy Herrington

- Theatrical release poster
- Directed by: Rowdy Herrington
- Written by: Rowdy Herrington
- Produced by: Tim Moore; Cassian Elwes
- Starring: James Spader; Cynthia Gibb
- Cinematography: Shelly Johnson
- Edited by: Harry B. Miller III
- Music by: Danny Di Paola
- Production company: Palisades Entertainment
- Distributed by: Palisades Entertainment
- Release date: May 6, 1988
- Running time: 97 minutes
- Country: United States
- Language: English
- Budget: $1.5 million

Jack's Back is a 1988 American mystery thriller film written and directed by Rowdy Herrington in his directorial debut. It stars James Spader in dual roles, Cynthia Gibb, Jim Haynie, Robert Picardo, Rod Loomis, and Rex Ryon. It follows a serial killer who celebrates Jack the Ripper's 100th anniversary by committing similar murders.

The film began a limited theatrical release in the United States on May 6, 1988. It received mixed reviews from critics, while Spader's performance was praised and earned him a nomination for the Saturn Award for Best Actor.

== Plot ==
In Los Angeles, a young doctor named John Wesford becomes a suspect when a series of Jack the Ripper copycat killings is committed. John and another young doctor, Jack Pendler, are at the scene of the latest crime in the series; they know each other because they both work for the same medical unit, reporting to the abusive Dr. Sidney Tannerson. Pendler seems to realize that John's testimony will likely lead to his being arrested as the killer and murders him, staging the scene to resemble a suicide. The police quickly name John as the copycat killer and hypothesize that he killed himself out of guilt.

To the surprise of everybody involved, John's identical twin brother, Rick, appears and claims to know John did not kill himself because he has seen visions of the true killer and Pendler killing John. The police humor Rick, but only because his existence calls into question the eyewitness testimony that had put the identical looking John at the scene of the crime, and Rick's suspicious knowledge of the crime scene makes him an attractive suspect himself. Under scrutiny by the police, Rick allies himself with another of John's colleagues, Dr. Chris Moscari, and carries out his own investigation. He successfully identifies, tracks down and confronts Pendler, who attacks him and is arrested. Pendler is in some regards an excellent suspect — physical evidence puts him at the scene of the final murder. But in other regards he is a terrible one, not matching known characteristics or habits of the killer.

Rick continues to dream about John's murder and asks police psychologist Dr. Carlos Battera to hypnotize him to clarify these visions. In the refined vision, he again sees Pendler attack John, but also notices that Pendler's shoes do not match those worn by the copycat killer and that Tannerson had been at the scene. He intuits that Tannerson will next attack Chris and speeds to her house, attracting a string of police cars with his reckless driving. Chris survives and Rick avenges John's death by killing Tannerson, who seemingly had manipulated Pendler into killing John.

== Cast ==
- James Spader as John Wesford / Rick Wesford
- Cynthia Gibb as Christine Moscari
- Jim Haynie as Sergeant Gabriel
- Robert Picardo as Dr. Carlos Battera
- Rod Loomis as Dr. Sidney Tannerson
- Rex Ryon as Jack Pendler
- Chris Mulkey as Scott Morofsky
- Wendell Wright as Captain Walter Prentis
- John Wesley as Sam Hilliard
- Bobby Hosea as Tom Dellerton
- Danitza Kingsley as Denise Johnson
- Anne Betancourt as Mary
- John Sutherland as "Chooch"
- Diane Erickson as Andrea Banks
- Sis Greenspon as Martha
- Graham Timbes as Surgeon
- Mario Machado as Anchorman
- Paul Du Pratt as Collin Marsh
- Rana Ford as Emily Miller
- Kevin Glover as Neil Finchley
- Daniela Petr as Sister
- Shawne Rowe as Helen
- Cassian Elwes as Pimp
- Spencer Clarke as Pimp
- Pola Del Mar as Mrs. Battera
- Kathryn O'Reilly as Hooker
- Brian Bender as Fatman
- Cindy Guyer as Neighbor
- Richard Parker as Reporter
- Frances Fleming as 911 Operator

== Production ==
Originally, director Rowdy Herrington wanted to call the film Red Rain and have the song of the same name by Peter Gabriel playing as the opening credits theme. However the budget didn't allow for licensing the song, so instead Paul Saax was brought on board to co-write a new theme, "Red Harvest". The film's title was changed to Jack's Back as a result.

== Release ==
=== Theatrical ===
Jack's Back premiered in New York City on May 6, 1988, and was released in Los Angeles and other Southern California locations on May 13, 1988. The film opened in Chicago on June 3, 1988.

=== Home media ===
UK-based distributor Slam Dunk Media released the film on DVD in May 2007 in a 1.33:1 full frame format. It is the only DVD release to date in that area. It was available on Netflix video streaming service in SD widescreen format. Scream Factory released the film in fall 2015 for the first time on Blu-ray in the US, and also included a DVD in the package, knowing that the film had never made it to the format in North America.

== Reception ==
=== Critical response ===
On the review aggregator website Rotten Tomatoes, 71% of 7 critics' reviews are positive, with an average rating of 6.3/10.

Roger Ebert gave the film 3 out of 4 stars and stated, "It's not a great movie, but it's the kind of film that makes you curious about what Harrington will do next." Ebert particularly praised James Spader's performance, writing that "But apart from the pleasures of the plot, what makes Jack's Back worth seeing is the work of Spader, a young actor who I believe has as much promise as anyone of his generation."

Odie Henderson opined, "Jack's Back maintains a giddy storyteller's glee from beginning to end, painting itself into corner after corner, only to escape every time. It works because of its stubborn belief in all aspects of the pulpy yarn it spins. There's real charm in its compulsive desire to tie its preposterous loose ends, no matter how complicated the knots become."

On the other hand, Caryn James of The New York Times gave the film a negative review and wrote that it "is so dull it leaves you plenty of time to marvel at how a plot can be this rickety, how a production can look this shabby, and how the first-time writer and director Rowdy Herrington could borrow a story with so relentless a grip on our imaginations and in no time at all declaw it."

Michael Wilmington of the Los Angeles Times called the film "a psychological shocker that carves up the Jack the Ripper legend in convoluted but predictable ways" and wrote that "Herrington gets stuck in his triple-twists, stock characters, chases and movie-movie plotting." Wilmington also stated, "But beyond Spader's performance, the only really interesting thing about Jack's Back is the lighting."

=== Accolades ===
Year	Award	Category	Nominee	Result
1990	16th Saturn Awards	Best Actor	James Spader	Nominated
