= Stape (surname) =

Stape is the surname of the following people:

== People ==
- John Stape, a fictional character from the soap opera Coronation Street
- William N. Stape, American screenwriter

== Characters ==
- Fiona Stape, character Coronation Street, first appearing in 2001
- Hope Stape, character Coronation Street, first appearing in 2010
