= SportsCentury =

- Genre: Documentary
- Written by: Michael Husain (11 episodes, 2001–2006); Pat Smith (1 episode, 1999); Michael Douglas Callan (1 episode, 2001); Michael Strom (unknown episodes)
- Directed by: Michael Husain (2 episodes, 2001–2005); Michael Douglas Callan (1 episode, 2001); Sean Waters (1 episode, 2006)
- Presented by: Chris Fowler
- Composers: Geoff Zanelli (8 episodes, 2000–2003); Gregg Lehrman (3 episodes, 2004–2005); Robert Leslie Bennett (2 episodes, 2000–2003); Pedro Bromfman (2 episodes, 2003–2005); Ramón Balcázar (1 episode, 2000); Robin Lynn (1 episode, 2000); Charles A. Wolschon (2 episodes, 2003–2005)
- Country of origin: United States
- Original language: English
- No. of episodes: 261

Production
- Cinematography: Jim Grieco (87 episodes, 1999–2006); Jared Manders (8 episodes, 2000–2005); Doug Longwill (5 episodes, 2001–2004)
- Running time: 30—60 minutes
- Production company: ESPN

Original release
- Network: ESPN
- Release: January 22, 1999 – 2007

Related
- Beyond the Glory

SportsCentury is an ESPN biography television program that reviews the people and events that defined sports in North America throughout the 20th and 21st centuries, using stock footage, photographs and on-camera interviews.

In 1999, ESPN counted down the Top 50 Athletes of the 20th Century, selected from North American athletes and voted on by a panel of sports journalists and observers, premiering a new biography highlighting each top athlete every week throughout the year. The episodes for the top two athletes, Michael Jordan and Babe Ruth, appeared on a special combined edition broadcast on Christmas Day on ABC. The top two names were announced in no particular order, and the final positioning was announced at the conclusion of the two episodes. An additional list of numbers 51–100 were announced on the ESPN SportsCentury website. Themed specials such as Greatest Games, Greatest Coaches, Greatest Dynasties, and Most Influential Individuals were premiered throughout the year, as well as six SportsCenter of the Decade programs.

After the initial run was complete, the episodes were rerun at various times on ESPN, ESPN2 and ESPN Classic. The original plan for the series was to expand to include #51 through #100. Ultimately, the series featured just over half of the athletes from #51 to #100, and instead expanded to include over 150 other athletes, coaches, owners, personalities, and notable moments in sports history. Acknowledgements were given to athletes that were notable for more recent accomplishments, even if they spent only a small part of their career in the 20th century (e.g., Tiger Woods, Tom Brady), or were recently deceased (e.g. Pat Tillman, Dale Earnhardt). Special subsets of episodes were created revolving around a particular event, including athletes associated with the particular sport. They would typically air in the days leading up to those events. (e.g., Winter Olympics, golf majors, Indianapolis 500, etc.)

ESPN Classic began to feature the program, with host Chris Fowler, as the highlight of its weeknight prime-time programing, airing five nights a week. After cycling through the entire series several times, and after debuting several new episodes, it was removed as a nightly program. As of 2007, reruns of the documentary series airs Monday through Friday at 4 p.m. Eastern time. The last original program was that of Shaquille O'Neal, which aired in November 2007.

== Controversy ==
The final order of choices led to debate, some of which came from the SportsCentury camp. Bob Costas, one of the series' voters, said, "I had Babe Ruth as my number one, but I think the list they came up with was a good one. Everybody more or less deserved to be there." ESPN writer Bud Morgan conceded that the Secretariat pick "was kind of controversial because a lot of people took the attitude 'What is a four-legged animal doing on this list?'"

Tony Kornheiser, whose ballot was topped by Ruth, Muhammad Ali and Michael Jordan, said, "I can't conceive of how Ruth didn't finish number one. He had the greatest impact of anybody on a sport by far... Michael Jordan didn't have as many championships as Bill Russell and didn't score as many points as Wilt Chamberlain, and really didn't do anything to advance his sport, so maybe in retrospect I upgraded him a bit too much because the way he performed was so spectacular, and because of television I got to see highlights. They may have overpersuaded a lot of us... Did Jim Thorpe get the praise he deserved? Probably not, because there weren't enough people old enough to really remember him."

ESPN anchor Charley Steiner said "I think picking [Jordan] number one was a generational decision, not a historical one. Babe Ruth deserved it more."

=== Don King lawsuit ===
In 2005, Don King and his promotional company, Don King Productions, Inc. filed a $2.5 billion defamation suit against the Walt Disney Company, the current owners of ESPN and ABC Cable Networks Group, and Advocate Communications, after a documentary alleged that King had "killed, not once, but twice", threatened to break Larry Holmes' legs, had a hospital invest into a film that was never made, cheated Meldrick Taylor out of $1 million, and then threatened to have Taylor killed. Though the documentary repeated many claims that were already made, King said he had now had enough. King's attorney said "It was slanted to show Don in the worst way. It was one-sided from day one, Don is a strong man, but he has been hurt by this."

The case was dismissed on summary judgment with a finding that King could not show "actual malice" from the defendants, and that King had failed to prove that any of the challenged statements were false. The judgement also pointed out that the studio had tried on a number of occasions to interview King for the documentary, but he had declined; while not suggesting that King had a legal obligation to do so, the court sympathized with ESPN's circumstances on those grounds. King appealed the decision and, 3 years later, the Second District Court of Appeals upheld the summary judgement, but disagreed with the original finding that none of the statements were false. In any case, Judge Dorian Damoorgian ruled, "Nothing in the record shows that ESPN purposefully made false statements about King in order to bolster the theme of the program or to inflict harm on King".

== Recognition ==
SportsCentury won a Peabody Award in 1999 "for overall excellence in sports broadcasting."

== SportsCentury: Top 50 American Athletes of the 20th Century (Original series) ==
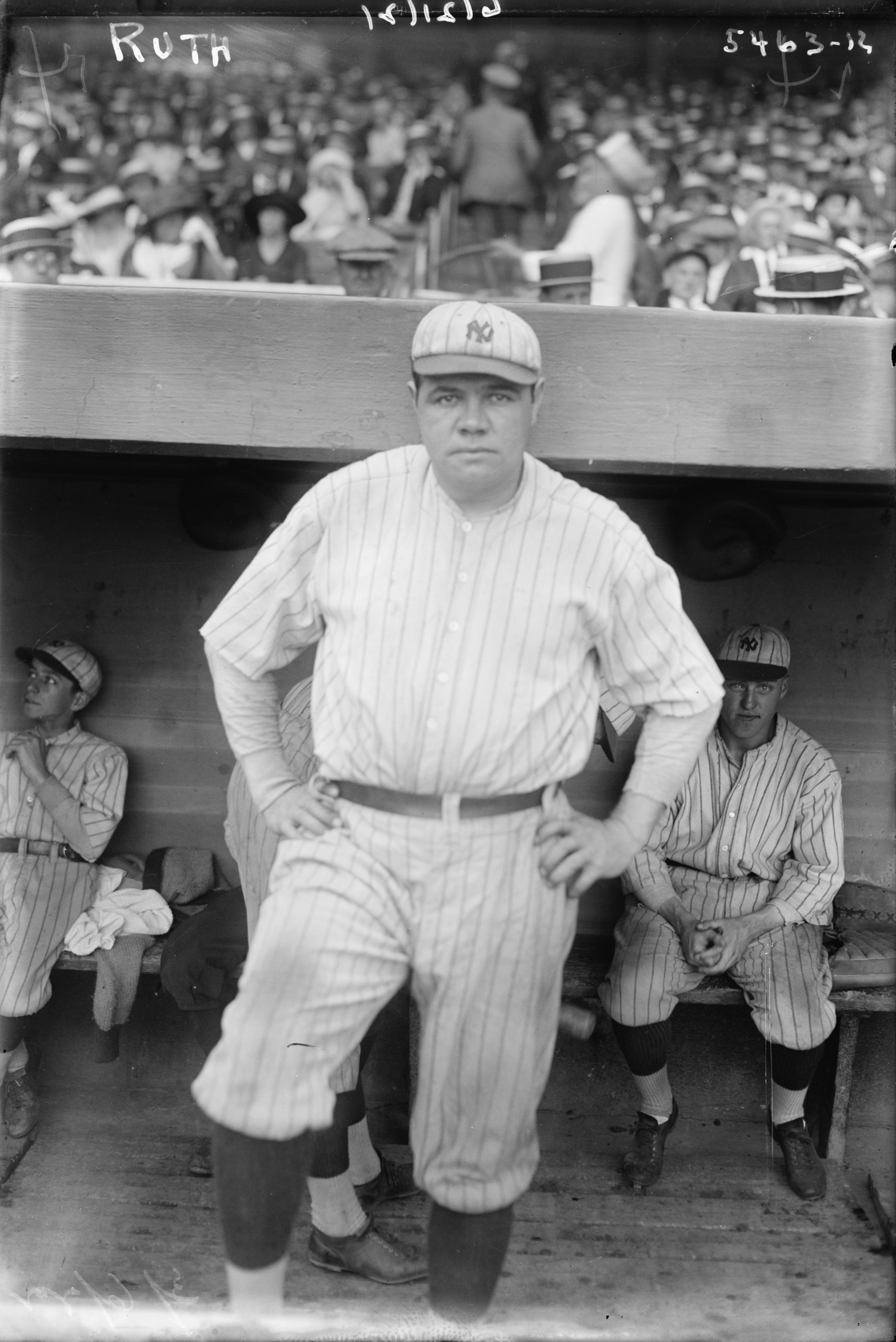
Babe Ruth was voted No. 2

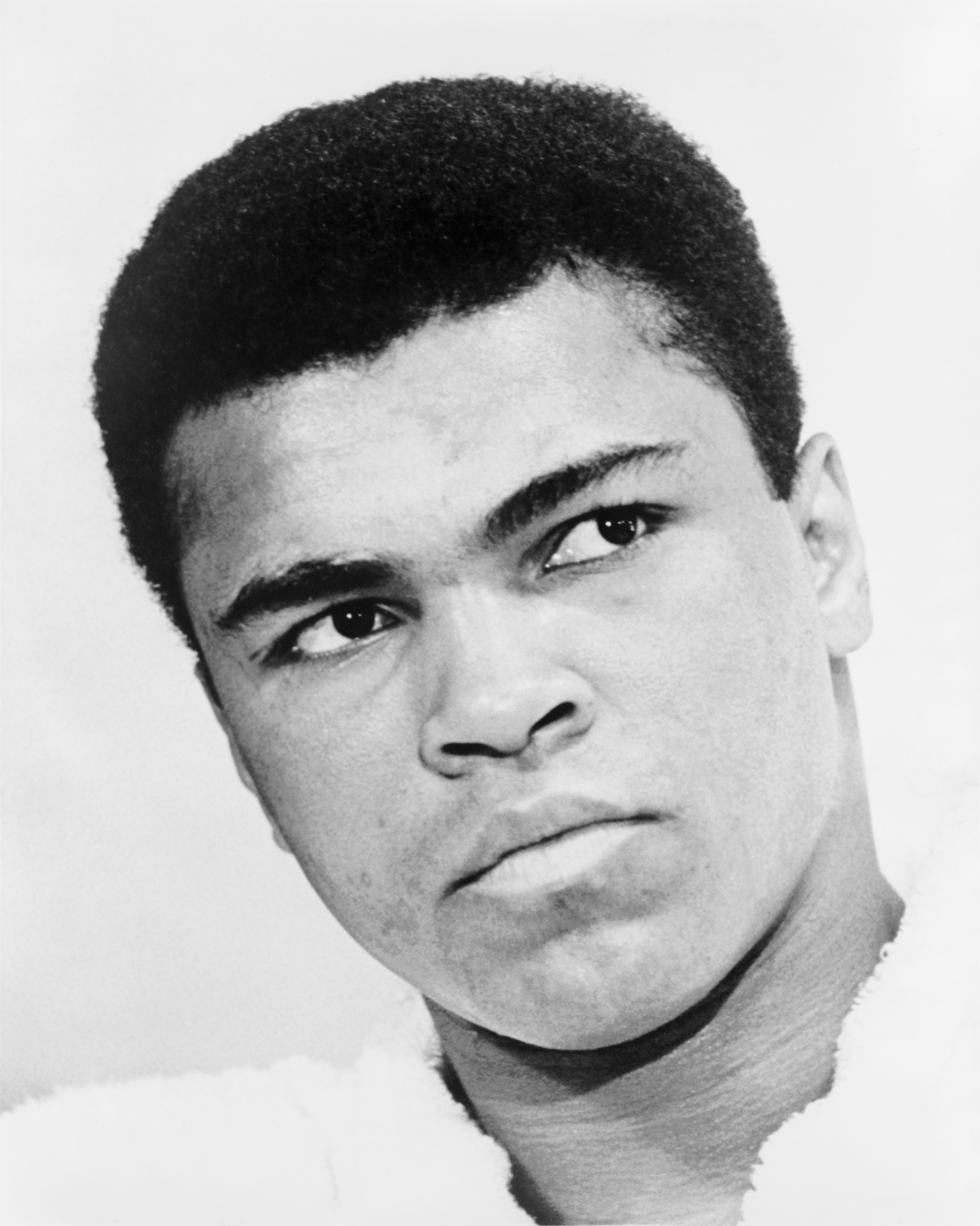
Muhammad Ali was voted No. 3

Number	Athlete	Sport
1	Michael Jordan	Basketball
2	Babe Ruth	Baseball
3	Muhammad Ali	Boxing
4	Jim Brown	Football
5	Wayne Gretzky	Ice hockey
6	Jesse Owens	Track and field
7	Jim Thorpe	Multiple sports
8	Willie Mays	Baseball
9	Jack Nicklaus	Golf
10	Babe Zaharias	Multiple sports
11	Joe Louis	Boxing
12	Carl Lewis	Track and field
13	Wilt Chamberlain	Basketball
14	Hank Aaron	Baseball
15	Jackie Robinson	Baseball
16	Ted Williams	Baseball
17	Magic Johnson	Basketball
18	Bill Russell	Basketball
19	Martina Navratilova	Tennis
20	Ty Cobb	Baseball
21	Gordie Howe	Ice hockey
22	Joe DiMaggio	Baseball
23	Jackie Joyner-Kersee	Track and field
24	Sugar Ray Robinson	Boxing
25	Joe Montana	Football
26	Kareem Abdul-Jabbar	Basketball
27	Jerry Rice	Football
28	Red Grange	Football
29	Arnold Palmer	Golf
30	Larry Bird	Basketball
31	Bobby Orr	Ice hockey
32	Johnny Unitas	Football
33	Mark Spitz	Swimming
34	Lou Gehrig	Baseball
35	Secretariat	Horse racing
36	Oscar Robertson	Basketball
37	Mickey Mantle	Baseball
38	Ben Hogan	Golf
39	Walter Payton	Football
40	Lawrence Taylor	Football
41	Wilma Rudolph	Track and field
42	Sandy Koufax	Baseball
43	Julius Erving	Basketball
44	Bobby Jones	Golf
45	Bill Tilden	Tennis
46	Eric Heiden	Speed skating, cycling
47	Edwin Moses	Track and field
48	Pete Sampras	Tennis
49	O. J. Simpson	Football
50	Chris Evert	Tennis

== SportsCentury: 51–100 ==
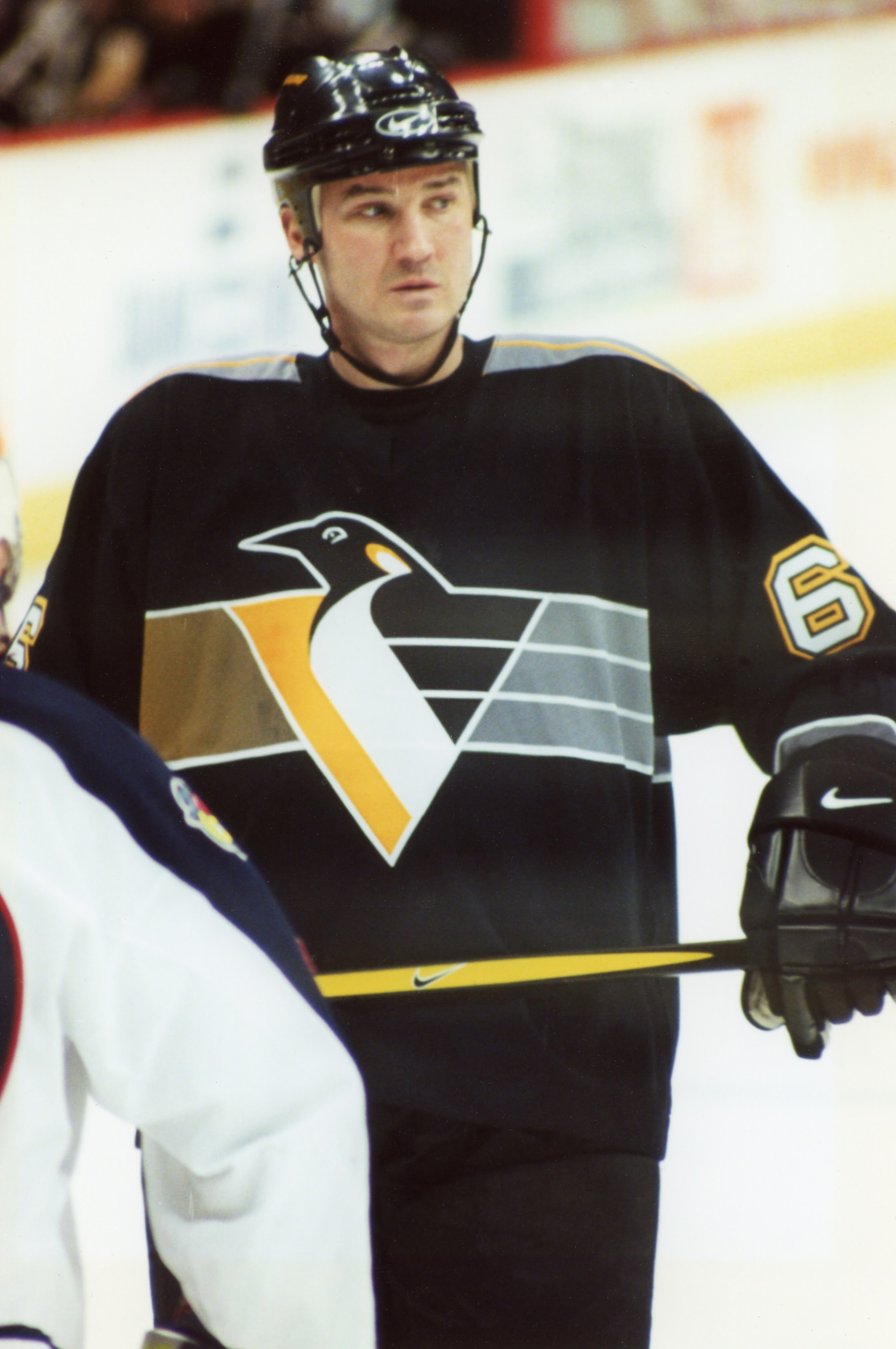
Mario Lemieux was voted no. 55

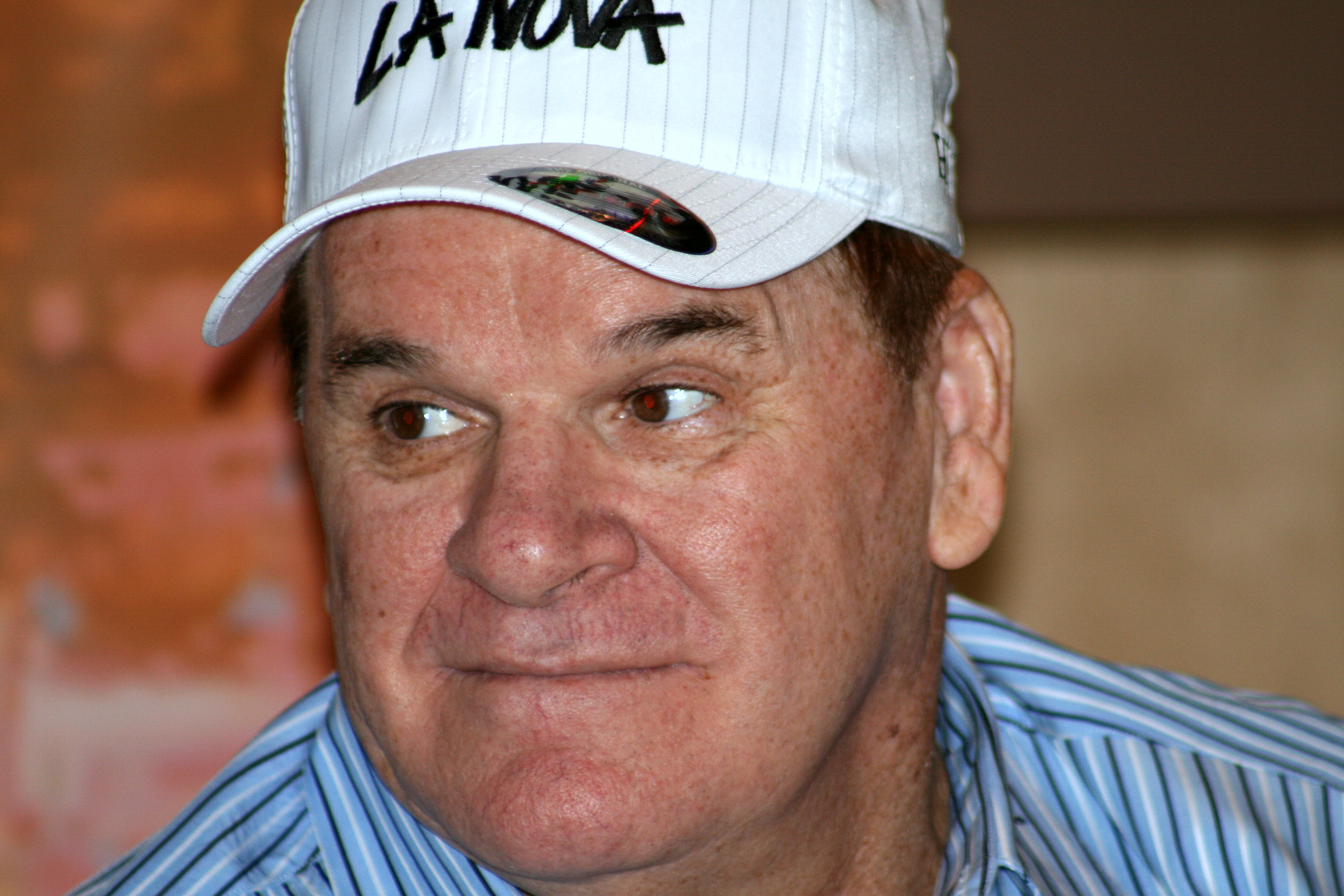
Pete Rose was voted no. 56 despite serving a lifetime ban from baseball.

Number	Athlete	Sport
51	Rocky Marciano	Boxing
52	Jack Dempsey	Boxing
53	Rafer Johnson	Track and field
54	Greg Louganis	Diving
55	Mario Lemieux	Ice hockey
56	Pete Rose	Baseball
57	Bill Shoemaker	Horse racing
58	Elgin Baylor	Basketball
59	Billie Jean King	Tennis
60	Walter Johnson	Baseball
61	Stan Musial	Baseball
62	Jerry West	Basketball
63	Satchel Paige	Baseball
64	Sammy Baugh	Football
65	Althea Gibson	Tennis, golf
66	Eddie Arcaro	Horse racing
67	Bob Gibson	Baseball
68	Al Oerter	Track and field
69	Bonnie Blair	Speed skating
70	Dick Butkus	Football
71	Roberto Clemente	Baseball
72	Bo Jackson	Football, baseball
73	Josh Gibson	Baseball
74	Deion Sanders	Football, baseball
75	Dan Marino	Football
76	Barry Sanders	Football
77	Cy Young	Baseball
78	Bob Mathias	Track and field
79	Gale Sayers	Football
80	A. J. Foyt	Auto racing
81	Jimmy Connors	Tennis
82	Bobby Hull	Ice hockey
83	Honus Wagner	Baseball
84	Man o' War	Horse racing
85	Maurice Richard	Ice hockey
86	Otto Graham	Football
87	Henry Armstrong	Boxing
88	Joe Namath	Football
89	Rogers Hornsby	Baseball
90	Richard Petty	Auto racing
91	Bob Beamon	Track and field
92	Mario Andretti	Auto racing
93	Don Hutson	Football
94	Bob Cousy	Basketball
95	George Blanda	Football
96	Michael Johnson	Track and field
97	Citation	Horse racing
98	Don Budge	Tennis
99	Sam Snead	Golf
100	Jack Johnson	Boxing

== Athlete statistics ==
By sport

- Baseball: 22
- Football: 20
- Track/Field: 12
- Basketball: 11
- Tennis: 8
- Boxing: 7
- Hockey: 6
- Golf: 6
- Horse racing: 5 (2 jockeys, 3 horses)
- Auto racing: 3
- Swimming / Diving: 2
- Speed skating: 2
- Gymnastics: 1

By gender

- 89 male
- 8 female
- 3 thoroughbred horses

== Additional SportsCentury episodes ==
=== Athletes ===
- Affirmed & Alydar
- Andre Agassi
- Lyle Alzado
- Lance Armstrong
- Arthur Ashe
- Charles Barkley
- Chuck Bednarik
- Albert Belle
- Johnny Bench
- Yogi Berra
- Moe Berg
- Barry Bonds
- Terry Bradshaw
- Tom Brady
- Kobe Bryant
- Roy Campanella
- Jennifer Capriati
- Steve Carlton
- Rubin Carter
- Roger Clemens
- Cynthia Cooper
- Jim Craig
- John Daly
- Ernie Davis
- Oscar De La Hoya
- Dale Earnhardt
- Dale Earnhardt Jr.
- Dennis Eckersley
- John Elway
- Brett Favre
- Bob Feller
- Mark Fidrych
- Charlie Finley
- Carlton Fisk
- Peggy Fleming
- Tim Flock
- Curt Flood
- Richmond Flowers
- Doug Flutie
- Cheryl Ford
- George Foreman
- Bevo Francis
- Joe Frazier
- Dan Gable
- Kevin Garnett
- Zina Garrison
- Mark Gastineau
- Frank Gifford
- Jeff Gordon
- Steffi Graf
- Red Grange
- Rocky Graziano
- Hank Greenberg
- Florence Griffith Joyner
- Marvin Hagler
- Dorothy Hamill
- Mia Hamm
- Connie Hawkins
- Evander Holyfield
- Paul Hornung
- Sam Huff
- Allen Iverson
- Reggie Jackson
- Dan Jansen
- Bruce Jenner (Note: Jenner changed her first name to Caitlyn due to gender transition in 2015.)
- Derek Jeter
- Nile Kinnick
- Anna Kournikova
- Michelle Kwan
- Don Larsen
- Sugar Ray Leonard
- Ray Lewis
- Eric Lindros
- Sonny Liston
- Nancy Lopez
- Jerry Lucas
- Karl Malone
- Peyton Manning
- Pete Maravich
- Roger Maris
- Billy Martin (2-part)
- Pedro Martínez
- Gene Mauch
- Bill Mazeroski
- John McEnroe
- Mark McGwire
- Denny McLain
- Jim McMahon
- Rick Mears
- Phil Mickelson
- Archie Moore
- Randy Moss
- Alonzo Mourning
- Greg Norman
- Shaquille O'Neal
- Terrell Owens
- Pelé
- Brian Piccolo
- Jimmy Piersall
- Jacques Plante
- Gary Player
- Jim Plunkett
- Cal Ripken Jr.
- Frank Robinson
- Andy Roddick
- Dennis Rodman
- Seabiscuit
- Curt Schilling
- Willie Shoemaker
- Emmitt Smith
- Seattle Slew
- Sammy Sosa
- Latrell Sprewell
- Bart Starr
- Casey Stengel
- Tony Stewart
- Darryl Strawberry
- Maurice Stokes
- Picabo Street
- Isiah Thomas
- Pat Tillman
- Lee Trevino
- Mike Tyson
- Al Unser Sr.
- Bill Vukovich
- Bill Walton
- Bud Wilkinson
- Chris Webber
- Reggie White
- Jayson Williams
- Venus & Serena Williams
- Tyrone Willingham
- Tiger Woods
- Carl Yastrzemski
- Sources

=== Coaches, owners, and other personalities ===
- Sparky Anderson
- Red Auerbach
- Bobby Bowden
- Larry Brown
- Bear Bryant
- Al Davis
- Woody Hayes
- Phil Jackson
- Willie Jeffries
- Don King
- Bob Knight
- Mike Krzyzewski
- Tom Landry
- Vince Lombardi
- Bill Parcells
- Rick Pitino
- Pete Rozelle
- Adolph Rupp
- Don Shula
- Dean Smith
- George Steinbrenner
- Bill Veeck
- Dick Vermeil
- John Wooden

=== Games, teams, and other special episodes ===
- 1972 Olympic Men's Basketball Final
- 1977 British Open
- Game 5 of the 1997 NBA Finals ("The Flu Game")
- Ball Four
- Epic in Miami (Chargers vs. Dolphins)
- New York Yankees
- Jerry's Cowboys
- Bears 46 defense
- Villanova vs. Georgetown (1985 NCAA Championship)
- Disciples of Jackie Robinson
- 1999 Ryder Cup

== Special episodes ==
=== SportsCentury: Greatest Games of the 20th Century ===
"Greatest Games" was a top ten countdown of the best games/matches voted on from a wide variety of team and individual sports.

1. "The Greatest Game Ever Played" – (1958 NFL Championship): Baltimore Colts vs. New York Giants (1958)
2. The Shot Heard 'Round the World – Bobby Thomson's home run (1951)
3. Super Bowl III – New York Jets defeat Baltimore Colts (1969)
4. Miracle on Ice – U.S.A defeats U.S.S.R. (1980)
5. "Thrilla in Manila" – Muhammad Ali vs. Joe Frazier (1975)
6. "Ice Bowl" – Green Bay vs. Dallas (1967)
7. Game 6 of the 1975 World Series – Carlton Fisk's home run (1975)
8. Tiger Woods wins the Masters (1997)
9. Willis Reed and Knicks beat Lakers in Game 7 (1970)
10. Borg-McEnroe Wimbledon thriller (1980)

=== SportsCentury: Greatest Coaches of the 20th Century ===
"Greatest Coaches" was a top ten countdown of the best coaches voted on from a wide variety of team sports

1. Vince Lombardi
2. John Wooden
3. Red Auerbach
4. Dean Smith
5. Bear Bryant
6. John McGraw
7. George Halas
8. Don Shula
9. Paul Brown
10. Knute Rockne

=== SportsCentury: Greatest Dynasties ===
- New York Yankees
- Boston Celtics
- Montreal Canadiens
- John Wooden's UCLA Bruins (1960s and 1970s)
- Notre Dame Fighting Irish football team (1946–1949)
- Dallas Cowboys (1990s)
- Atlanta Braves (1990s)
- Chicago Bulls (1990s)
- San Francisco 49ers (1980s)

=== SportsCentury: Most Influential Individuals ===
Another top ten countdown special, focusing on influential figures in sports during the twentieth century, namely off-the-field contributors.

1. Branch Rickey
2. Pete Rozelle
3. Roone Arledge
4. Marvin Miller
5. Kenesaw Mountain Landis
6. David Stern
7. Avery Brundage
8. Walter O'Malley
9. George Halas
10. Mark McCormack

=== SportsCentury: The Year in Review ===
- 1980 Year in Review
- 1981 Year in Review
- 1982 Year in Review
- 1983 Year in Review
- 1984 Year in Review
- 1985 Year in Review
- 1986 Year in Review
- 1987 Year in Review
- 1988 Year in Review
- 1989 Year in Review
- 1990 Year in Review
- 1991 Year in Review
- 1992 Year in Review
- 1993 Year in Review
- 1994 Year in Review
- 1995 Year in Review
- 1996 Year in Review
- 1997 Year in Review
- 1998 Year in Review
- 1999 Year in Review
- 2000 Year in Review
- 2001 Year in Review

Also included in the overall production was "SportsCenter of the Decade", a series of six two-hour programs (1900–1949, 1950s, 1960s, 1970s, 1980s and 1990s). Each episode was presented as a fictional episode of SportsCenter, in the way ESPN would have covered the events at the time (styles, studio/production design, and other various pop culture references).
