= Ronald Krauss (filmmaker) =

American film director, producer, and screenwriter

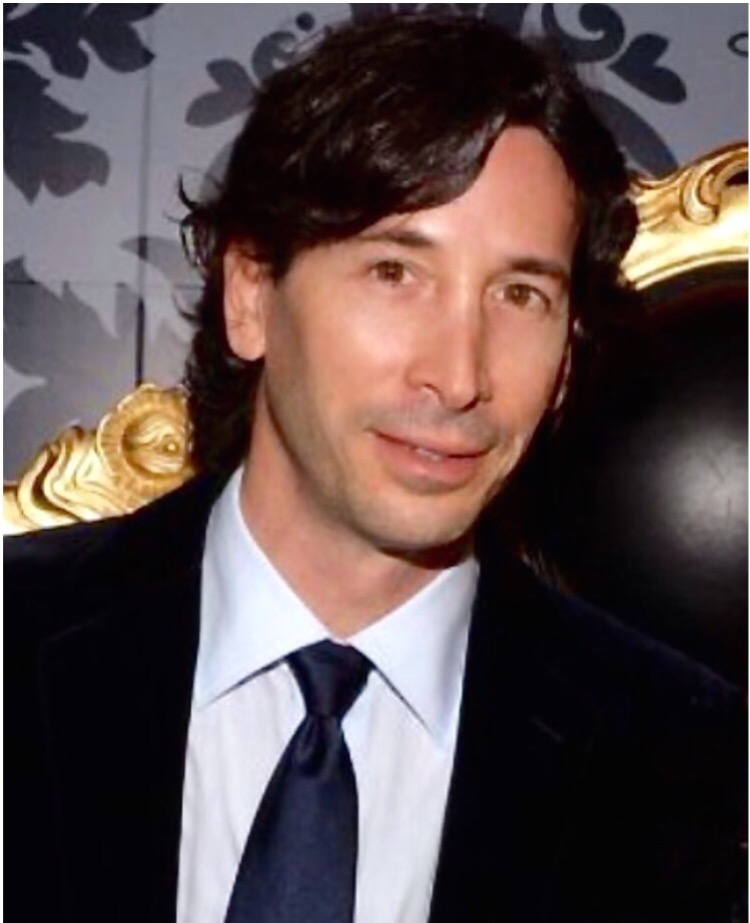
- Born: Manhattan, New York City, New York, United States
- Occupations: Film director, producer, writer
- Notable work: Gimme Shelter, "Amexica", "Alien Hunter", "Puppies for Sale"

Ronald Krauss is an American film director, producer, and screenwriter. He directed the films Puppies for Sale (1998), Amexica (2010), and Gimme Shelter (2013).

== Life and career ==
Ronald Krauss was born in Manhattan. He studied architecture, design, and communications at Syracuse University. Early in his career, Krauss worked in the art department at Roger Corman Studios for two years and learned all departments of filmmaking.

He moved on to produce and direct music videos and commercials starting his own production company Aron Productions, Inc. He worked with several musical artists such as Lit, Nas, Luca, Joe, Whitney Houston, Guns N' Roses, and Algebra. Aron Productions produced over one hundred music video and commercial productions, which included several national advertising campaigns.

Krauss continued building his career in film by writing, producing, and directing his first short film "Puppies for Sale" (1998) starring Academy Award winner Jack Lemmon. The film garnered critical acclaim, winning "Best Short Film" in more than twenty film festivals worldwide, and appeared before special screenings of The Little Mermaid (1984) during a 1997 re-release.

For television, Krauss produced the television series "Chicken Soup for the Soul" (1999-2001), an adaptation of the bestselling books. The family drama starred Martin Sheen, Julie Hagerty, Ed Asner, and others. While producing the show, Krauss would contribute on writing and directing select episodes. Ninety episodes were completed from 1999-2001.

Krauss served as producer for "Beyond the Glory", a documentary series that profiles some of the most legendary and controversial athletes in history. He wrote, produced, and directed an episode on Carl Lewis, work which led to an Emmy nomination for the show.

Krauss made his feature debut with "Rave" (2000). He followed "Rave" with his second feature "Alien Hunter" (2003), a science fiction picture starring James Spader.

In 2008, Krauss started his new company, Day 28 Films, combining his experience in documentary film and humanitarian efforts to create a media company that focuses on inspirational and socially relevant entertainment dealing with the human condition.

Krauss then wrote, produced, and directed Amexica, a story set in the underworld of human trafficking, starring AnnaLynne McCord and Joseph Ferrante. He worked closely with several anti-human trafficking organizations to create an accurate portrayal and raise awareness in the fight against this global issue. It was screened in the United Nations.

In January 2014, Krauss’ third feature Gimme Shelter released in theaters, starring Vanessa Hudgens, Rosario Dawson, Brendan Fraser, and James Earl Jones. The film was inspired by a true story of a pregnant teenager and her experiences with Kathy DiFiore’s Several Sources Shelters.

== Humanitarian causes ==
- The Crippled Children's Society - Fundraising Campaign and Project Manager (1996-1998)
- The Project to End Human Trafficking - Volunteer (2009-2011)
- Respect Challenges - Founder and Chair (2015–present)

== Honors and awards ==
- Writers Guild of America 1997 - Nominated, WGA Award (TV), Children's Script for "Reading Rainbow", “Fly Away Home" (1983)
- Aspen Shortsfest 1998 - Won, Jurdy Award, Best of Category, Children, for "Puppies for Sale" (1998)
- Berlin International Film Festival 1998 - Won, Best Short Film for "Puppies for Sale" (1998)
- Carrousel International du Film 1998 - Won, Camério, Best Short Film for "Puppies for Sale" (1998)
- Giffoni Film Festival 1998 - Won, Bronze Gryphon, Best Short Film, for "Puppies for Sale" (1998)
- Heartland Film Festival 1998 - Won, Crystal Heart Award for "Puppies for Sale" (1998)
- Kodak Vision Award 1998 - Ronald Krauss for "Puppies for Sale" (1998)
- Temecula Valley International Film Festival 1998 - Won, Best Short Film for "Puppies for Sale" (1998)
- Chicago International Children's Film Festival 1999 - Won, Children's Jury Award, Short Film and Video, Live-Action, for "Puppies for Sale" (1998)
- Montevideo Film Festival for Children and Young People 1998 - Won, Best Short Film for "Puppies for Sale" (1998).
- Temecula Valley International Film Festival 2000 - Won, Best Feature Film for "Rave" (2000)
- Sports Emmy Awards 2005 - Nominated, Emmy, Sports Series/Anthology for "Beyond the Glory" (2001)
- Mount Shasta International Film Festival 2008 - Won, Jury Award, Best Short Film for "Saving Angelo" (2007)
- Honolulu International Festival (II) 2010 - Won, Silver Lei Award for "Amexica" (2010)
- Malibu Film Festival 2010 - Won, Best of the Fest, Best Drama for "Amexica" (2010)
- United Nations 2011 - Honorary screening for "Amexica" (2010)
- Heartland Film Festival 2013 - Won, Truly Moving Picture Award for "Gimme Shelter"
- Christopher Awards 2014- Won, Christopher Award, Feature Films, for "Gimme Shelter"
- United Nations 2014 - Honorary screening of "Gimme Shelter"

== Filmography ==
=== Film ===
- Gimme Shelter (2013) – director, producer, writer
- Amexica (2010) – director, producer, writer
- Saving Angelo (2007) – producer, writer
- Fellowship of the Dice - Producer
- Alien Hunter (2003) – director
- Rave (2000) – director, producer, writer
- Puppies for Sale (1998) – director, producer, writer

=== Television ===
- Chicken Soup for the Soul
- Beyond the Glory
