= Phage (Star Trek: Voyager) =

- Star Trek: Voyager episode
- Episode no.: Season 1 Episode 5
- Directed by: Winrich Kolbe
- Story by: Timothy De Haas
- Teleplay by: Brannon Braga; Skye Dent
- Production code: 105
- Original air date: February 6, 1995

Guest appearances
- Cully Fredricksen - Dereth; Stephen Rappaport - Motura; Martha Hackett - Seska

Episode chronology
← Previous "Time and Again"	Next → "The Cloud"
- Star Trek: Voyager season 1

"Phage" is the fifth episode of the first season of the American science fiction television series Star Trek: Voyager. The episode was directed by Winrich Kolbe. Set in the 24th century, the series follows the adventures of the Starfleet and Maquis crew of the starship USS Voyager after they are stranded in the Delta Quadrant far from the rest of the Federation.

Voyager's crew beams deep into a planet they hope is rich in fuel for their resource-deprived spacecraft, but they are thwarted when aliens steal a crew member's lungs.

This episode aired on UPN on February 6, 1995.

== Plot ==
An away team is beamed into a network of caverns in a planetoid to search for dilithium deposits. In the course of the search, Neelix is attacked by a previously undetected alien and left in a state of shock. He is beamed directly to the ship's sickbay where it is discovered that his lungs have been transported out of his body. The Emergency Medical Hologram keeps him alive by projecting a pair of holographic lungs into his torso using the sickbay's holographic emitters. As a result, Neelix must remain absolutely motionless, able only to talk, for the rest of his life or until his lungs are recovered.

Another away mission is quickly organized to find the perpetrator and retrieve Neelix's lungs. They return to the planetoid and discover an alien facility behind sophisticated cloaking technology, and conclude that the facility is being used to store organic material, particularly respiratory organs. The aliens escape the planetoid on a ship, and Voyager goes in pursuit. Eventually, Voyager catches up with them and captures the two alien life forms aboard the ship. An interrogation reveals that they are Vidiians, an alien race that have been suffering for generations from an incurable disease called the Phage. The Vidiians harvest organs from other races to replace their own in an attempt to outpace the degeneration caused by the Phage.

It transpires that Neelix's lungs have already been transplanted into one of the aliens, and Captain Kathryn Janeway's ethical obligations force her to let them go rather than condemn the alien to death by retrieving the lungs. In response to her leniency, the aliens offer to help Neelix, and provide the expertise necessary to perform a transplant from another crew member, a procedure which the Medical Hologram originally considered impossible due to anatomical incompatibility. Neelix receives a donor lung from his partner, Kes.

== Reception ==
Reviewers Lance Parkin and Mark Jones found Neelix (played by Ethan Phillips) "too irritating" to care whether he died or not, but revelled in the performance of Robert Picardo as the holographic Doctor. The story is similar to that of "Spock's Brain", an episode from the original series, in which aliens harvest Spock's brain.

In 2004, the website Trek Today called the episode "Voyager's first really successful issue-oriented episode, "Phage" had everything going for it - terrific characterization, a frightening new alien adversary, a complex decision on the part of the captain."

In 2016, Empire ranked this the 44th best out of the top 50 episodes of all 700-plus Star Trek television episodes.

In 2020, io9 listed this as one of the seven "must-watch" episodes of Star Trek: Voyager's first season.

In 2021, Nerdist said this was one of the top ten Star Trek episodes with first alien contact, praising the disgusting Vidiians as the best enemy alien species of the early seasons.

== Video releases ==
This episode was released on LaserDisc in Germany in 1996, paired with "The Cloud" for 49 DEM. 1st Season Vol. 3 included "Phage" with the German language title Transplantationen and "The Cloud" as Der Mysteriöse Nebel on a single double sided 12" LaserDisc, with a German audio Dolby Surround soundtrack.
