= Emanations (Star Trek: Voyager) =

- Star Trek: Voyager episode
- Episode no.: Season 1 Episode 9
- Directed by: David Livingston
- Written by: Brannon Braga
- Production code: 109
- Original air date: March 13, 1995

Guest appearances
- Cecile Callan - Ptera; Jeffrey Alan Chandler - Hatil; John Cirigliano - Dr. Renora; Robin Groves - Loria; Martha Hackett - Seska; Jerry Hardin - Dr. Neria

Episode chronology
← Previous "Ex Post Facto"	Next → "Prime Factors"
- Star Trek: Voyager season 1

"Emanations" is the ninth episode of Star Trek: Voyager, an American science fiction television show about a spacecraft, set in the 24th century of the Star Trek universe. The starship USS Voyager encounters an alien species and investigates. This episode centers on the experiences of Harry Kim, and is also noted for an exploration of afterlife concepts.

This episode aired on UPN on March 13, 1995.

== Plot ==
Voyager detects the signature of an as-yet undiscovered heavy element within the ring system of a planet and organises an away team to investigate the cavern systems of one of the rocks. In doing so, they discover numerous humanoid bodies, covered in a cobweb-like substance, and conclude that the cavern system is a burial ground. They discover that the burial ground is still in use when a "subspace vacuole" opens and deposits a body shrouded in webbing. Another vacuole begins to form and the away team is beamed out for safety reasons, but Ensign Kim disappears into the vacuole and is replaced by a female alien body, also wrapped in the webs.

Kim has been transported to a mortuary on the aliens' homeworld and finds himself in a pod-shaped device, which the aliens open to release him. They identify themselves as the Vhnori and believe that Kim has come from the "Next Emanation", their name for the afterlife. The pods, when activated, open a vacuole and transport the dying Vhnori inside to the emanation. Confined to the mortuary building, Kim meets Hatil, who has been scheduled by his family to go to the Next Emanation. Hatil had had an accident that made it necessary for his family to care for him. The confusion surrounding Kim's arrival to the planet reinforces his doubts about the nature of the afterlife and about wanting to go to the Next Emanation.

Meanwhile on Voyager, the Doctor revives the body of the woman who replaced Kim. She becomes hysterical when she realises that the afterlife is not as she had believed. Eventually she agrees to be transported into a forming vacuole in an attempt to be returned to her homeworld, but the attempt fails. Her dead body rematerializes, swathed in the web-like substance.

On the homeworld, Kim and Hatil agree to switch places so that Kim can be transported back through a vacuole using the burial pod, and Hatil can escape and live out his life in a rural village. Hatil wraps Kim in a burial shroud. Kim is rescued by Voyager and revived after being transported through the pod. Later, he worries about his experience, but Captain Kathryn Janeway reassures him that their scans picked up emanations of neural energy coming from the bodies of the deceased Vhnori, and a giant energy field made of thousands of these energy patterns is around the asteroid field, indicating a possible afterlife for the Vhnori.

== Cast commentary ==
Tim Russ (cast as Tuvok) thought that "Emanations" (along with "Elogium") were stories that challenged concepts, ideas, attitudes and traditions — all things that Star Trek creator Gene Roddenberry originally wrote science fiction about: "That, I think, is the most important part of Star Trek".

== Reception ==
This had a Nielsen rating of 7.1 points when it was aired in 1995. The book The Religions Of Star Trek described the Voyager television episode "Emanations" as having a "detailed and fascinating exploration of the afterlife and resurrection".

In 2021, Screen Rant said this was a "fascinating examination of life and death" and a great episode for Harry Kim.
