= Alien Hunter =

2003 American-Bulgarian film

- Australian DVD cover
- Directed by: Ronald Krauss
- Written by: Boaz Davidson; J.S. Cardone
- Produced by: Boaz Davidson; David Yost
- Starring: James Spader; Janine Eser; John Lynch; Leslie Stefanson; Carl Lewis; Anthony Crivello; Roy Dotrice; Keir Dullea
- Cinematography: Darko Suvak
- Edited by: Amanda I. Kirpaul
- Music by: Tim Jones
- Production companies: Millennium Films; Sandstorm Films; Nu Image
- Distributed by: Columbia TriStar Home Video
- Release date: July 19, 2003
- Running time: 92 minutes
- Countries: United States; Bulgaria
- Languages: English; Russian

Alien Hunter is a 2003 American-Bulgarian science-fiction-thriller film directed by Ronald Krauss and starring James Spader, Carl Lewis and Leslie Stefanson.

== Plot ==
In 1947 New Mexico, a radio operator receives a bizarre signal coming from Roswell, New Mexico. He decides to investigate its origin and disappears tracking it.

In the present day, the same signal is received from the South Pole and then retransmitted from the Falkland Islands to the United States. A satellite image captures an unknown object sitting on the Antarctic snow. Cryptologist Julian Rome, a teacher at the University of California, Berkeley, is invited to investigate the mystery. He is sent to an Antarctic research base, which includes a large greenhouse of genetically modified plants being studied by scientists. They discover what appears to be an alien vehicle frozen in a large block of ice. The object is shaped like a shell or pod and is emitting the mysterious encrypted signal, with Julian concluding it to be a black box. Once it is released from the ice, Julian discovers that it has a powerful static electric charge on its surface and painfully shocks anyone who touches it.

Julian tries to decrypt the signal, while another team works to open the alien shell. Discovering the signal says: "Do not open!", Julian tries and fails to stop them from cutting off the lid, allowing a viscous liquid to pour out. An alien also escapes, while at the same time an airborne virus sealed in the shell kills four scientists by melting them from within. It is unclear whether or not the survivors are truly immune to the virus, and they are aware of the risk that, even if themselves healthy, they could still be carriers.

Being made aware of the alien virus and the global risk that it poses, the government asks a Russian nuclear submarine to fire a nuclear missile at the base before the threat can spread. As the submarine nears its firing position, Julian manages to communicate with the alien, before it is killed by one of the survivors. From communications with Washington, the scientists learn that if the virus escapes the lab, it will cause a pandemic destroying all life on Earth. Unsure whether or not they are infected, most agree to stay and accept death. Others seek to escape, killing a colleague in their effort to escape the incoming missile. On the way out of the base, they pass through an agricultural lab, where the corn immediately withers and dies. Despite this proof they are infected, one of the cowards opens the outside door in a bid to escape the imminent blast. There he finds an alien spaceship waiting. It apparently had homed in on the same signal Julian was studying. The ship kills the fleeing scientist but not Julian, who followed close on his heels in an effort to stop his escape. It is implied that the aliens made this selection after reading the minds of the two men. The final four scientists — Julian, Shelly, Kate, and Dr. Gierach, approach the ship and allow themselves to be brought on board, leaving seconds before the missile destroys the base.

In the aftermath, the government mounts a cover-up campaign by claiming that an experimental nuclear reactor at the base went into meltdown, destroying all of the facilities and killing everyone. The film ends with the alien spacecraft, still carrying the human survivors, leaving the Solar System.

== Cast ==
- James Spader as Julian Rome
- Janine Eser as Kate Brecher
- John Lynch as Dr. Michael Straub
- Nikolay Binev as Dr. Alexi Gierach
- Leslie Stefanson as Nyla Olson
- Aimee Graham as Shelly Klein
- Stuart Charno as Abell
- Carl Lewis as Grisham
- Svetla Vasileva as Dacia Petrova
- Anthony Crivello as Pilot
- Kaloian Vodenicharov as Co-Pilot
- George Stanchev as Airman
- Rufus Dorsey as Navigator
- Roy Dotrice as Dr. John Bachman
- Woody Schultz as Sam
- Ron Krauss as First Man
- William Ladd Skinner as Second Man
- Franklin A. Vallente as Third Man
- Hristo Aleksandrov as Fourth Man
- Ross W. Clarkson as Falkland Man # 1
- Willie Botha as Falkland Man # 2
- Tyrone Pinkham as Kitt Peak Man #1
- Atanas Srebrev as Kitt Peak Man #2
- Joel Polis as Copeland
- Keir Dullea as Secretary Bayer
- Bert Emmett as Gordon Osler
- Marianne Stanicheva as Reporter
- Dobrin Dosev as Captain Sokolov
- Atanas Atanasov as Executive Officer Volkov
- Hristo Shopov as Navigator Petrenko
- Harry Anichkin as Army General
- Velimir Velev as Alien
