= James Spader =

American actor (born 1960)

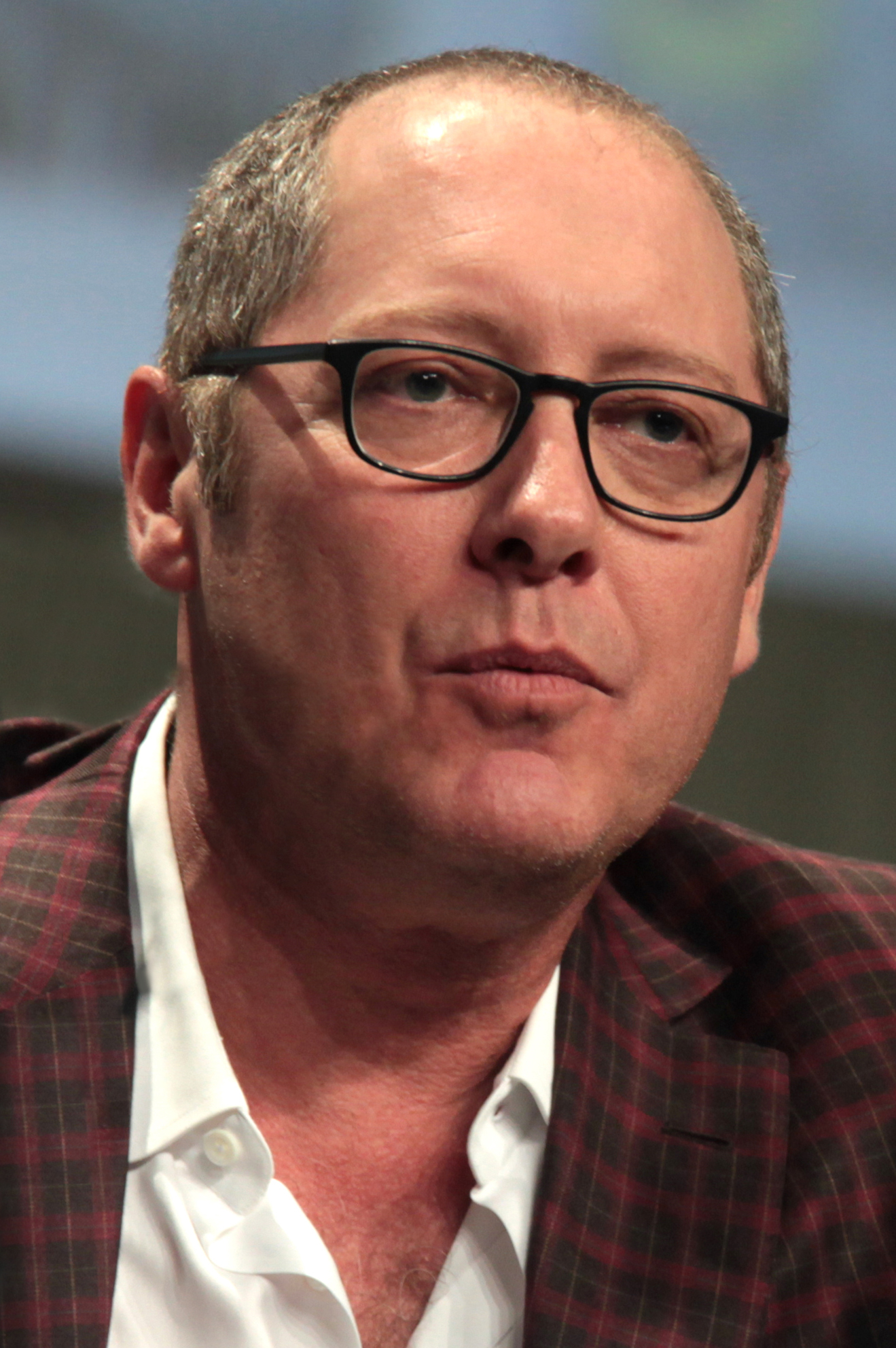
- Spader at the 2014 San Diego Comic-Con
- Born: James Todd Spader; February 7, 1960 (age 66); Boston, Massachusetts, U.S.
- Occupation: Actor
- Years active: 1978–present
- Spouse: Victoria Kheel (m. 1987; div. 2004)
- Partner: Leslie Stefanson (2002–present)
- Children: 3

James Todd Spader (/ˈspeɪdər/; born February 7, 1960) is an American actor. He is known for often portraying morally ambiguous and eccentric characters. His accolades include three Primetime Emmy Awards, a Cannes Film Festival Award for Best Actor, and nominations for three Golden Globe Awards and ten Screen Actors Guild Awards.

Spader began acting in youth-oriented films such as Tuff Turf, The New Kids (both 1985), Pretty in Pink (1986), and Mannequin (1987). His breakthrough role came in Steven Soderbergh's drama Sex, Lies, and Videotape (1989), for which he received the Cannes Film Festival Award for Best Actor. He then starred in films such as White Palace (1990), True Colors (1991), Stargate (1994), 2 Days in the Valley (1996), and Secretary (2002). Spader took supporting roles in Bob Roberts (1992), Wolf (1994), Shorts (2009), Lincoln (2012), and The Homesman (2014). He also played the role of Ultron in the Marvel Cinematic Universe film Avengers: Age of Ultron (2015) and reprised the role in the Disney+ miniseries VisionQuest (2026).

His television roles include the attorney Alan Shore in the last season of The Practice (2003–2004) and its spin-off Boston Legal (2004–2008), which earned him three Emmy Awards for Outstanding Lead Actor in a Drama Series. He portrayed Robert California in the sitcom The Office (2011–2012). He then starred as Raymond Reddington in the NBC crime thriller television series The Blacklist (2013–2023), for which he received two Golden Globe Award nominations for Best Actor – Television Series Drama.

== Early life and education ==
James Todd Spader was born on February 7, 1960, in Boston, Massachusetts, and is the youngest of three children. His parents, Jean (née Fraser) and Stoddard ("Todd") Greenwood Spader, were both teachers. He grew up on the North Shore near Andover, Massachusetts, and in Marion, Massachusetts, near Cape Cod. He worked at the General Grocery Store where he was simply known as "Jimmy". He has two older sisters, Libby Spader and Annie Spader. According to Spader, he had a very progressive and liberal upbringing. "I was always around dominant and influential women, and that left a great impression". Spader is a sixth-generation descendant of Connecticut politician Seth P. Beers. Laurent Clerc, co-founder of the American School for the Deaf, is his 3rd great-grandfather.

During his early education, he attended many private schools, including The Pike School in Andover where his mother taught art, and the Brooks School in North Andover where his father was a teacher. He later transferred to Phillips Academy, befriended President John F. Kennedy's son John F. Kennedy Jr., dropped out at the age of seventeen, and moved to New York City to pursue his acting career. While studying to become a full-time actor, Spader undertook jobs including bartending, teaching yoga, driving a meat truck, loading railroad cars, and being a stable boy.

== Acting career ==
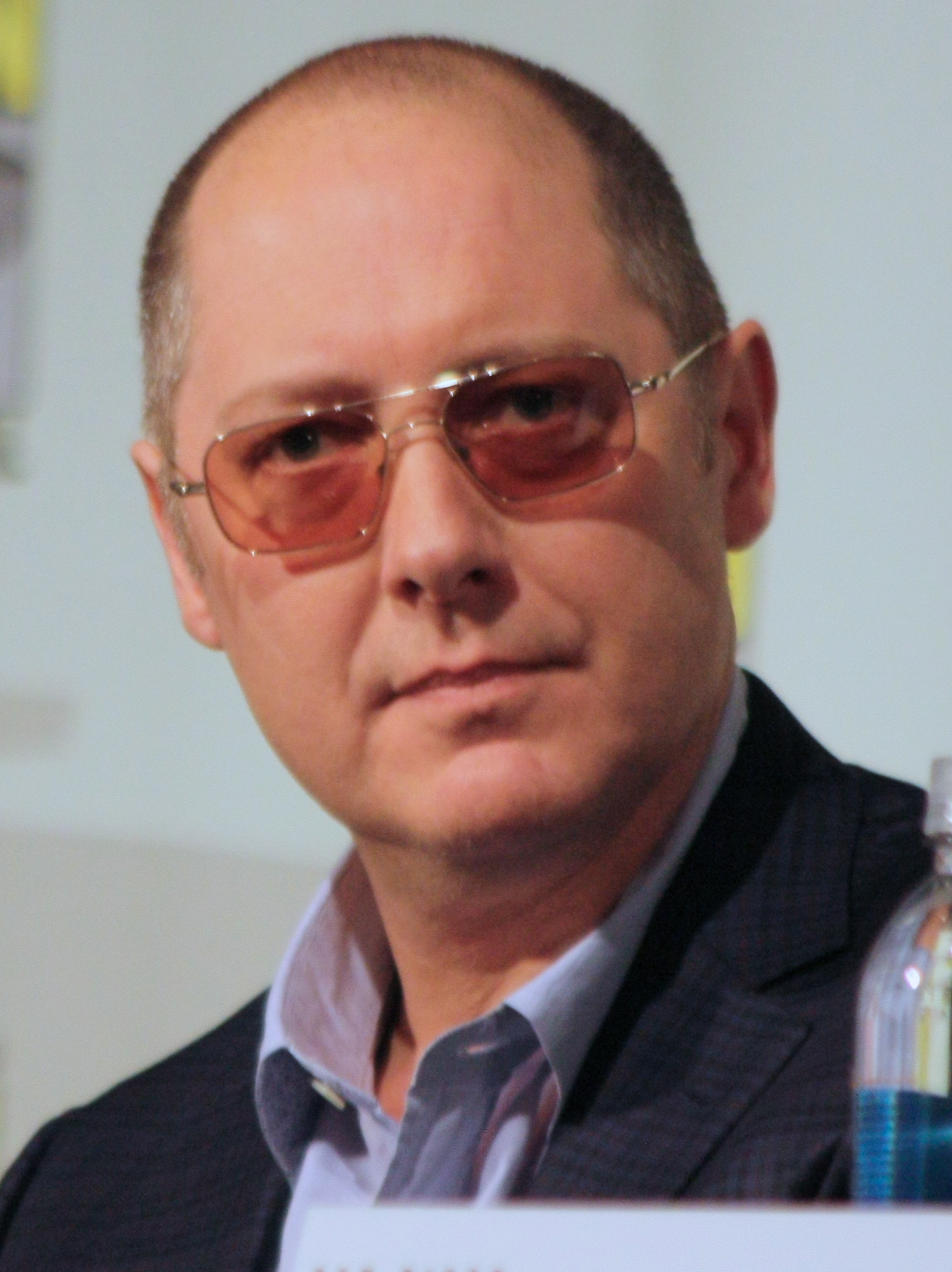
Spader features in The Blacklist as Raymond Reddington

Spader's first major film role was in the film Endless Love (1981), and his first starring role was in Tuff Turf (1985). He rose to stardom in 1986, when he played the rich, arrogant playboy Steff in Pretty in Pink. He co-starred in Mannequin (1987) and the film adaptation of Less than Zero (1987), in which he played a drug dealer named Rip. Supporting roles in films such as Baby Boom (1987) and Wall Street (1987) followed until his breakthrough in Sex, Lies, and Videotape (1989), in which he played a sexual voyeur who complicates the lives of three Baton Rouge, Louisiana residents. For this performance, he received the Best Actor Award at the Cannes Film Festival.

Spader's roles in the early 1990s included a young, affluent widower opposite Susan Sarandon in the romantic drama White Palace (1990), a yuppie who meets the mysterious Rob Lowe in the Noir drama Bad Influence (1990), John Cusack's best friend in the drama True Colors (1991), and a poker-playing drifter in The Music of Chance (1993). In 1994, he starred as Egyptologist Daniel Jackson in the sci-fi film Stargate. In 1996, he played car accident fetishist James Ballard in the controversial Canadian film Crash and assassin Lee Woods in 2 Days in the Valley. In 1997, Spader guest starred in the Seinfeld episode "The Apology", as an angry recovering alcoholic who refuses to apologize to George for making fun of him. In 2000, he played a drug-addicted detective tracking a serial killer in The Watcher. In 2002, he starred as a sadomasochistic lawyer in Secretary.

From 2004 to 2008, Spader starred as Alan Shore in Boston Legal, in which he reprised his role from The Practice (2003). Longtime writer-producer David E. Kelley said there was resistance when he first tried to cast Spader in the role: "I was told that no one would ever welcome James Spader into their living room." During a TV Game Changers interview, Kelley noted, "People will watch him (Spader) in the movies, but they will never let him in their own home."

He won the Emmy Award for Outstanding Lead Actor in a Drama Series in 2004 for his portrayal on The Practice and won it again in 2005 and 2007 for Boston Legal. With the 2005 win, he became one of only a few actors to win an Emmy Award while playing the same character in two series. Even rarer, he won a second consecutive Emmy while playing the same character in two series. He also won the Satellite Award for Best Actor in a Series, Comedy or Musical for Boston Legal in 2006.

In October 2006, Spader narrated "China Revealed", the first episode of Discovery Channel's documentary series Discovery Atlas. He also did voice-over in several television commercials for Acura. He starred in Race, a play written and directed by David Mamet, which opened on December 6, 2009, at the Ethel Barrymore Theatre on Broadway. The show closed on August 21, 2010, after 297 performances. In March 2011, he was named to star in the film By Virtue Fall, written and to be directed by Sheldon Turner. As of June 2011, the movie was in pre-production.

Spader guest-starred as Robert California in "Search Committee", the season 7 finale of The Office. He then joined the cast as a regular member for the eighth season. While the original plan was just to do a guest appearance, executive producer Paul Lieberstein later said, "Those two scenes became a season".

Spader starred in the television series The Blacklist, which premiered on NBC on September 23, 2013, and had its series finale on July 13, 2023, for a total of 10 seasons. He portrayed Raymond "Red" Reddington, one of the FBI's most wanted fugitives.

He also played the villainous robot Ultron in Avengers: Age of Ultron (2015), and reprised the role in the Disney+ series VisionQuest, which premiered on October 14, 2026.

== Personal life ==
Spader met his future wife, decorator Victoria Kheel, while she was working in a yoga studio after he moved to New York City in the 1980s. They married in 1987 and had two sons. Spader filed for divorce from Kheel in 2004. He began dating his former Alien Hunter (2003) co-star, Leslie Stefanson, in 2002. They have a son together.

In an interview with Rolling Stone in 2014, Spader revealed he has obsessive–compulsive disorder.

== Acting credits ==
=== Film ===
| Year | Title | Role | Notes |
|---|---|---|---|
| 1978 | Team Mates | Jimmy | Acting debut |
| 1981 | Endless Love | Keith Butterfield | Credited as Jimmy Spader |
| 1985 | Tuff Turf | Morgan Hiller | |
| 1985 | The New Kids | Eddie "Dutra" Dutra | |
| 1986 | Pretty in Pink | Steff | |
| 1987 | Mannequin | Richards | |
| 1987 | Baby Boom | Ken Arrenberg | |
| 1987 | Less than Zero | Rip | |
| 1987 | Wall Street | Roger Barnes | |
| 1988 | Greasy Lake | Digby | Short film |
| 1988 | Jack's Back | John / Rick Westford | |
| 1989 | Sex, Lies, and Videotape | Graham Dalton | |
| 1989 | The Rachel Papers | Deforest | |
| 1990 | Bad Influence | Michael Boll | |
| 1990 | White Palace | Max Baron | |
| 1991 | True Colors | Tim Gerrity | |
| 1992 | Storyville | Cray Fowler | |
| 1992 | Bob Roberts | Chuck Marlin | |
| 1993 | The Music of Chance | Jack Pozzi | |
| 1993 | Dream Lover | Ray Reardon | |
| 1994 | Wolf | Stewart Swinton | |
| 1994 | Stargate | Dr. Daniel Jackson | |
| 1996 | Crash | James Ballard | |
| 1996 | 2 Days in the Valley | Lee Woods | |
| 1997 | Keys to Tulsa | Ronnie Stover | |
| 1997 | Driftwood | The Man | |
| 1997 | Critical Care | Dr. Werner Ernst | |
| 1998 | Curtain Call | Stevenson Lowe | |
| 2000 | Supernova | Nick Vanzant | |
| 2000 | The Watcher | Joel Campbell | |
| 2000 | Slow Burn | Marcus | |
| 2001 | Speaking of Sex | Dr. Roger Klink | |
| 2002 | Secretary | E. Edward Grey | |
| 2002 | The Stickup | John Parker | |
| 2003 | I Witness | Douglas Draper | |
| 2003 | Alien Hunter | Julian Rome | |
| 2004 | Shadow of Fear | William Ashbury | |
| 2009 | Shorts | Carbon Black | |
| 2012 | Lincoln | William Bilbo | |
| 2014 | The Homesman | Aloysius Duffy | |
| 2015 | Avengers: Age of Ultron | Ultron | Voice and motion-capture |

=== Television ===
| Year | Title | Role | Notes |
|---|---|---|---|
| 1983 | Diner | Fenwick | Television short |
| 1983 | The Family Tree | Jake Nichols | 6 episodes |
| 1983 | Cocaine: One Man's Seduction | Buddy Gant | Television film |
| 1983 | A Killer in the Family | Donny Tison | Television film |
| 1984 | Family Secrets | Lowell Everall | Television film |
| 1985 | Starcrossed | Joey Callaghan | Television film |
| 1994 | Frasier | Steven | Voice; episode: "Slow Tango in South Seattle" |
| 1997 | Seinfeld | Jason "Stanky" Hanke | Episode: "The Apology" |
| 2003 | The Pentagon Papers | Daniel Ellsberg | Television film |
| 2003–2004 | The Practice | Alan Shore | 22 episodes |
| 2004–2008 | Boston Legal | Alan Shore | 101 episodes |
| 2006 | Discovery Atlas | Narrator | Voice; episode: "China Revealed" |
| 2011–2012 | The Office | Robert California | 20 episodes |
| 2013–2023 | The Blacklist | Raymond "Red" Reddington / "Pinky" / "Ray" | 218 episodes; also executive producer |
| 2026 | VisionQuest | Ultron, Virgil P. Horton | 8 episodes |

=== Theater ===
| Year | Title | Role | Playwright | Venue | Ref. |
|---|---|---|---|---|---|
| 2009 | Race | Jack Lawson | David Mamet | Ethel Barrymore Theatre, Broadway | |
