= Ronald Krauss (medical researcher) =

American professor of pediatrics

Ronald M. Krauss
- Education: Harvard Medical School
- Occupation: Professor of Pediatrics
- Known for: Research on lipoproteins, saturated fat controversy, low-carbohydrate diet advocacy
- Awards: Fellow of the American Heart Association; Member of the American Society for Clinical Investigation

Ronald M. Krauss is an American professor of pediatrics, medical researcher and low-carbohydrate diet advocate. He studies genetic, dietary, and hormonal effects on plasma lipoproteins and coronary disease risk.

== Biography ==
Krauss is Professor of Pediatrics and Medicine, UCSF, and Adjunct Professor of Nutritional Sciences, University of California at Berkeley. He received his medical degree at Harvard Medical School and received postdoctoral training at the National Institutes of Health. He is board certified in internal medicine, endocrinology and metabolism.

He has disclosed that he received grants from the National Cattlemen's Beef Association and National Dairy Council. He is also on the scientific advisory board of Virta Health, a company that provides ketogenic diet counselling for people with diabetes.

Krauss is a Fellow of the American Heart Association and member of the American Society for Clinical Investigation.

== Views on saturated fat ==
Krauss disputes the current saturated fat guidelines. Krauss has argued that "the amount of saturated fat that we consume in our diet has a relatively small effect on the saturated fat in our body compared with the amount that is produced from carbohydrates." In a 2016 interview with Mark Hyman, Krauss stated that his research has not found a connection between saturated fat intake and increased heart disease risk and that it is carbohydrates that increase the risk.
