= List of minor planets: 682001–683000 =

The following is a partial list of minor planets, running from minor-planet number 682001 through 683000, inclusive. The primary data for this and other partial lists is based on JPL's "Small-Body Orbital Elements" and data available from the Minor Planet Center. Critical list information is also provided by the MPC, unless otherwise specified from Lowell Observatory. A detailed description of the table's columns and additional sources are given on the main page including a complete list of every page in this series, and a statistical break-up on the dynamical classification of minor planets.

Also see the summary list of all named bodies in numerical and alphabetical order, and the corresponding naming citations for the number range of this particular list. New namings may only be added to this list after official publication, as the preannouncement of names is condemned by the Working Group for Small Bodies Nomenclature of the International Astronomical Union.

Near-Earth obj.	MBA (inner)	MBA (outer)	Centaur
Mars-crosser	MBA (middle)	Jupiter trojan	Trans-Neptunian obj.
Unclassified

== 682001–682100 ==
Designation			Discovery			Properties		Ref
Permanent	Provisional	Named after	Date	Site	Discoverer(s)	Category	Diam.	Ref
682001	2006 AL_{78}	—	December 30, 2005	Kitt Peak	Spacewatch	·	1.5 km	MPC; JPL
682002	2006 AO_{87}	—	January 4, 2006	Kitt Peak	Spacewatch	JUN	1.0 km	MPC; JPL
682003	2006 AL_{88}	—	January 5, 2006	Kitt Peak	Spacewatch	VER	1.9 km	MPC; JPL
682004	2006 AM_{89}	—	January 5, 2006	Kitt Peak	Spacewatch	·	1.2 km	MPC; JPL
682005	2006 AU_{89}	—	February 12, 2002	Kitt Peak	Spacewatch	·	1.1 km	MPC; JPL
682006	2006 AN_{91}	—	January 7, 2006	Kitt Peak	Spacewatch	T_{j} (2.93)	3.3 km	MPC; JPL
682007	2006 AX_{94}	—	January 4, 2006	Mount Lemmon	Mount Lemmon Survey	·	970 m	MPC; JPL
682008	2006 AB_{103}	—	January 7, 2006	Mauna Kea	P. A. Wiegert, D. D. Balam	·	2.6 km	MPC; JPL
682009	2006 AR_{103}	—	January 7, 2006	Mauna Kea	P. A. Wiegert, D. D. Balam	·	2.4 km	MPC; JPL
682010	2006 AH_{106}	—	January 5, 2006	Kitt Peak	Spacewatch	URS	2.5 km	MPC; JPL
682011	2006 AA_{109}	—	January 10, 2006	Mount Lemmon	Mount Lemmon Survey	·	1.5 km	MPC; JPL
682012	2006 AC_{110}	—	July 13, 2013	Mount Lemmon	Mount Lemmon Survey	·	1.7 km	MPC; JPL
682013	2006 AS_{110}	—	January 13, 2011	Mount Lemmon	Mount Lemmon Survey	EOS	1.7 km	MPC; JPL
682014	2006 AV_{110}	—	April 7, 2007	Mount Lemmon	Mount Lemmon Survey	·	1.7 km	MPC; JPL
682015	2006 AK_{111}	—	January 7, 2006	Kitt Peak	Spacewatch	·	1.7 km	MPC; JPL
682016	2006 AD_{113}	—	January 15, 2018	Mount Lemmon	Mount Lemmon Survey	·	2.1 km	MPC; JPL
682017	2006 AL_{113}	—	January 13, 2011	Mount Lemmon	Mount Lemmon Survey	KOR	1.1 km	MPC; JPL
682018	2006 AJ_{114}	—	March 24, 2014	Haleakala	Pan-STARRS 1	CLA	1.2 km	MPC; JPL
682019	2006 AP_{115}	—	January 7, 2006	Kitt Peak	Spacewatch	·	2.3 km	MPC; JPL
682020	2006 AV_{115}	—	January 5, 2006	Kitt Peak	Spacewatch	·	730 m	MPC; JPL
682021	2006 AR_{116}	—	January 7, 2006	Mount Lemmon	Mount Lemmon Survey	·	2.7 km	MPC; JPL
682022	2006 AK_{117}	—	January 5, 2006	Kitt Peak	Spacewatch	VER	2.3 km	MPC; JPL
682023	2006 AP_{117}	—	January 10, 2006	Mount Lemmon	Mount Lemmon Survey	·	2.1 km	MPC; JPL
682024	2006 AR_{117}	—	January 5, 2006	Kitt Peak	Spacewatch	EOS	1.4 km	MPC; JPL
682025	2006 AM_{118}	—	January 7, 2006	Mount Lemmon	Mount Lemmon Survey	THM	1.8 km	MPC; JPL
682026	2006 BE_{4}	—	January 21, 2006	Kitt Peak	Spacewatch	THM	2.1 km	MPC; JPL
682027	2006 BO_{4}	—	January 8, 2006	Kitt Peak	Spacewatch	·	960 m	MPC; JPL
682028	2006 BP_{4}	—	January 8, 2006	Kitt Peak	Spacewatch	·	2.3 km	MPC; JPL
682029	2006 BJ_{10}	—	January 10, 2006	Mount Lemmon	Mount Lemmon Survey	·	2.6 km	MPC; JPL
682030	2006 BY_{15}	—	January 22, 2006	Mount Lemmon	Mount Lemmon Survey	·	680 m	MPC; JPL
682031	2006 BY_{18}	—	December 27, 2005	Kitt Peak	Spacewatch	EUN	910 m	MPC; JPL
682032	2006 BE_{35}	—	January 22, 2006	Mount Lemmon	Mount Lemmon Survey	3:2	4.0 km	MPC; JPL
682033	2006 BC_{48}	—	February 13, 2002	Kitt Peak	Spacewatch	·	1.2 km	MPC; JPL
682034	2006 BH_{48}	—	January 25, 2006	Kitt Peak	Spacewatch	·	2.4 km	MPC; JPL
682035	2006 BZ_{49}	—	January 25, 2006	Kitt Peak	Spacewatch	·	540 m	MPC; JPL
682036	2006 BP_{70}	—	January 23, 2006	Kitt Peak	Spacewatch	·	1.2 km	MPC; JPL
682037	2006 BT_{72}	—	January 23, 2006	Kitt Peak	Spacewatch	·	2.4 km	MPC; JPL
682038	2006 BD_{75}	—	January 23, 2006	Kitt Peak	Spacewatch	·	2.2 km	MPC; JPL
682039	2006 BN_{83}	—	January 25, 2006	Kitt Peak	Spacewatch	·	2.7 km	MPC; JPL
682040	2006 BF_{86}	—	January 25, 2006	Kitt Peak	Spacewatch	·	1.7 km	MPC; JPL
682041	2006 BP_{105}	—	January 25, 2006	Kitt Peak	Spacewatch	·	1.4 km	MPC; JPL
682042	2006 BO_{117}	—	December 6, 2005	Mount Lemmon	Mount Lemmon Survey	·	1.6 km	MPC; JPL
682043	2006 BJ_{146}	—	January 22, 2006	Mount Lemmon	Mount Lemmon Survey	·	1.9 km	MPC; JPL
682044	2006 BL_{163}	—	January 26, 2006	Mount Lemmon	Mount Lemmon Survey	·	2.4 km	MPC; JPL
682045	2006 BD_{169}	—	January 26, 2006	Mount Lemmon	Mount Lemmon Survey	·	1.2 km	MPC; JPL
682046	2006 BF_{171}	—	January 27, 2006	Kitt Peak	Spacewatch	·	540 m	MPC; JPL
682047	2006 BJ_{171}	—	January 22, 2006	Mount Lemmon	Mount Lemmon Survey	·	1.3 km	MPC; JPL
682048	2006 BY_{173}	—	January 5, 2006	Kitt Peak	Spacewatch	·	1.8 km	MPC; JPL
682049	2006 BD_{177}	—	April 19, 1996	Kitt Peak	Spacewatch	·	1.9 km	MPC; JPL
682050	2006 BE_{177}	—	January 27, 2006	Kitt Peak	Spacewatch	·	1.9 km	MPC; JPL
682051	2006 BU_{177}	—	January 27, 2006	Mount Lemmon	Mount Lemmon Survey	ELF	3.0 km	MPC; JPL
682052	2006 BV_{177}	—	January 27, 2006	Mount Lemmon	Mount Lemmon Survey	AGN	950 m	MPC; JPL
682053	2006 BH_{181}	—	January 27, 2006	Mount Lemmon	Mount Lemmon Survey	·	2.6 km	MPC; JPL
682054	2006 BD_{182}	—	January 27, 2006	Mount Lemmon	Mount Lemmon Survey	·	2.8 km	MPC; JPL
682055	2006 BU_{189}	—	January 28, 2006	Kitt Peak	Spacewatch	·	1.4 km	MPC; JPL
682056	2006 BL_{192}	—	January 30, 2006	Kitt Peak	Spacewatch	·	2.1 km	MPC; JPL
682057	2006 BL_{198}	—	January 30, 2006	Kitt Peak	Spacewatch	HNS	1.0 km	MPC; JPL
682058	2006 BN_{202}	—	October 7, 2005	Mauna Kea	A. Boattini	·	1.8 km	MPC; JPL
682059	2006 BH_{206}	—	January 31, 2006	Mount Lemmon	Mount Lemmon Survey	·	2.4 km	MPC; JPL
682060	2006 BL_{206}	—	January 31, 2006	Mount Lemmon	Mount Lemmon Survey	·	1.4 km	MPC; JPL
682061	2006 BD_{228}	—	January 31, 2006	Junk Bond	D. Healy	VER	2.7 km	MPC; JPL
682062	2006 BM_{230}	—	January 31, 2006	Kitt Peak	Spacewatch	·	1.7 km	MPC; JPL
682063	2006 BY_{230}	—	January 23, 2006	Kitt Peak	Spacewatch	·	2.4 km	MPC; JPL
682064	2006 BL_{235}	—	January 31, 2006	Kitt Peak	Spacewatch	·	1.4 km	MPC; JPL
682065	2006 BY_{236}	—	January 23, 2006	Kitt Peak	Spacewatch	·	1.1 km	MPC; JPL
682066	2006 BB_{239}	—	January 31, 2006	Mount Lemmon	Mount Lemmon Survey	·	1.4 km	MPC; JPL
682067	2006 BM_{249}	—	November 7, 2005	Mauna Kea	A. Boattini	·	1.1 km	MPC; JPL
682068	2006 BW_{249}	—	January 7, 2006	Mount Lemmon	Mount Lemmon Survey	·	2.7 km	MPC; JPL
682069	2006 BA_{250}	—	January 31, 2006	Mount Lemmon	Mount Lemmon Survey	EOS	1.5 km	MPC; JPL
682070	2006 BP_{250}	—	January 31, 2006	Kitt Peak	Spacewatch	·	1.1 km	MPC; JPL
682071	2006 BE_{264}	—	January 31, 2006	Kitt Peak	Spacewatch	·	2.7 km	MPC; JPL
682072	2006 BU_{279}	—	January 22, 2006	Mount Lemmon	Mount Lemmon Survey	·	620 m	MPC; JPL
682073	2006 BP_{286}	—	January 26, 2006	Mount Lemmon	Mount Lemmon Survey	·	1.9 km	MPC; JPL
682074	2006 BL_{289}	—	October 16, 2013	Oukaïmeden	M. Ory	·	1.0 km	MPC; JPL
682075	2006 BL_{290}	—	October 18, 2009	Mount Lemmon	Mount Lemmon Survey	·	1.6 km	MPC; JPL
682076	2006 BQ_{290}	—	August 24, 2003	Cerro Tololo	Deep Ecliptic Survey	EOS	1.5 km	MPC; JPL
682077	2006 BX_{290}	—	March 20, 2012	Haleakala	Pan-STARRS 1	·	2.7 km	MPC; JPL
682078	2006 BN_{291}	—	September 30, 2017	Mount Lemmon	Mount Lemmon Survey	·	1.5 km	MPC; JPL
682079	2006 BB_{292}	—	January 26, 2017	Haleakala	Pan-STARRS 1	·	780 m	MPC; JPL
682080	2006 BF_{293}	—	April 30, 2008	Mount Lemmon	Mount Lemmon Survey	·	2.2 km	MPC; JPL
682081	2006 BF_{294}	—	August 8, 2016	Haleakala	Pan-STARRS 1	·	1.2 km	MPC; JPL
682082	2006 BP_{294}	—	January 25, 2015	Haleakala	Pan-STARRS 1	·	1.3 km	MPC; JPL
682083	2006 BR_{294}	—	November 7, 2005	Mauna Kea	A. Boattini	·	1.3 km	MPC; JPL
682084	2006 BS_{294}	—	September 21, 2017	Haleakala	Pan-STARRS 1	·	1.3 km	MPC; JPL
682085	2006 BW_{294}	—	January 23, 2006	Kitt Peak	Spacewatch	HYG	2.1 km	MPC; JPL
682086	2006 BK_{295}	—	September 20, 2011	Mount Lemmon	Mount Lemmon Survey	·	1.1 km	MPC; JPL
682087	2006 BU_{295}	—	January 31, 2006	Kitt Peak	Spacewatch	·	1.3 km	MPC; JPL
682088	2006 BY_{295}	—	February 24, 2017	Haleakala	Pan-STARRS 1	·	1.8 km	MPC; JPL
682089	2006 BT_{297}	—	January 30, 2006	Kitt Peak	Spacewatch	·	680 m	MPC; JPL
682090	2006 BC_{298}	—	January 22, 2006	Mount Lemmon	Mount Lemmon Survey	THM	1.9 km	MPC; JPL
682091	2006 BO_{298}	—	January 27, 2006	Mount Lemmon	Mount Lemmon Survey	·	1.2 km	MPC; JPL
682092	2006 BJ_{299}	—	January 23, 2006	Kitt Peak	Spacewatch	·	980 m	MPC; JPL
682093	2006 BO_{299}	—	January 21, 2006	Mount Lemmon	Mount Lemmon Survey	·	1.5 km	MPC; JPL
682094	2006 BO_{300}	—	January 23, 2006	Kitt Peak	Spacewatch	·	2.6 km	MPC; JPL
682095	2006 BY_{300}	—	January 23, 2006	Catalina	CSS	TIR	2.8 km	MPC; JPL
682096	2006 BZ_{300}	—	January 30, 2006	Kitt Peak	Spacewatch	·	1.7 km	MPC; JPL
682097	2006 BO_{301}	—	January 26, 2006	Kitt Peak	Spacewatch	V	410 m	MPC; JPL
682098	2006 BO_{302}	—	January 22, 2006	Mount Lemmon	Mount Lemmon Survey	·	2.1 km	MPC; JPL
682099	2006 CU_{1}	—	February 1, 2006	Kitt Peak	Spacewatch	·	1.5 km	MPC; JPL
682100	2006 CH_{2}	—	November 25, 2005	Mount Lemmon	Mount Lemmon Survey	·	1.4 km	MPC; JPL

== 682101–682200 ==
back to top

Designation			Discovery			Properties		Ref
Permanent	Provisional	Named after	Date	Site	Discoverer(s)	Category	Diam.	Ref
682101	2006 CM_{2}	—	January 22, 2006	Mount Lemmon	Mount Lemmon Survey	·	2.4 km	MPC; JPL
682102	2006 CB_{3}	—	February 1, 2006	Mount Lemmon	Mount Lemmon Survey	·	1.2 km	MPC; JPL
682103	2006 CF_{3}	—	February 1, 2006	Mount Lemmon	Mount Lemmon Survey	·	580 m	MPC; JPL
682104	2006 CQ_{6}	—	February 1, 2006	Mount Lemmon	Mount Lemmon Survey	·	860 m	MPC; JPL
682105	2006 CW_{6}	—	February 1, 2006	Mount Lemmon	Mount Lemmon Survey	·	1.7 km	MPC; JPL
682106	2006 CV_{10}	—	December 25, 2005	Mount Lemmon	Mount Lemmon Survey	PHO	910 m	MPC; JPL
682107	2006 CC_{12}	—	February 1, 2006	Kitt Peak	Spacewatch	V	500 m	MPC; JPL
682108	2006 CR_{14}	—	February 1, 2006	Kitt Peak	Spacewatch	·	1.3 km	MPC; JPL
682109	2006 CO_{16}	—	February 1, 2006	Mount Lemmon	Mount Lemmon Survey	·	1.1 km	MPC; JPL
682110	2006 CX_{16}	—	February 1, 2006	Mount Lemmon	Mount Lemmon Survey	VER	2.1 km	MPC; JPL
682111	2006 CL_{17}	—	February 1, 2006	Mount Lemmon	Mount Lemmon Survey	·	550 m	MPC; JPL
682112	2006 CH_{19}	—	February 1, 2006	Mount Lemmon	Mount Lemmon Survey	·	2.9 km	MPC; JPL
682113	2006 CF_{30}	—	October 24, 2005	Mauna Kea	A. Boattini	·	3.2 km	MPC; JPL
682114	2006 CG_{34}	—	February 2, 2006	Mount Lemmon	Mount Lemmon Survey	·	580 m	MPC; JPL
682115	2006 CK_{34}	—	February 2, 2006	Mount Lemmon	Mount Lemmon Survey	V	540 m	MPC; JPL
682116	2006 CY_{45}	—	January 7, 2006	Mount Lemmon	Mount Lemmon Survey	·	1.2 km	MPC; JPL
682117	2006 CS_{55}	—	February 4, 2006	Mount Lemmon	Mount Lemmon Survey	VER	2.0 km	MPC; JPL
682118	2006 CM_{64}	—	January 24, 2003	La Silla	A. Boattini, Hainaut, O.	·	660 m	MPC; JPL
682119	2006 CR_{64}	—	February 2, 2006	Mauna Kea	P. A. Wiegert	·	1.3 km	MPC; JPL
682120	2006 CB_{65}	—	December 4, 2005	Kitt Peak	Spacewatch	·	2.4 km	MPC; JPL
682121	2006 CH_{67}	—	February 1, 2006	Mount Lemmon	Mount Lemmon Survey	EOS	2.0 km	MPC; JPL
682122	2006 CZ_{71}	—	September 24, 2008	Kitt Peak	Spacewatch	·	920 m	MPC; JPL
682123	2006 CB_{74}	—	November 11, 2004	Kitt Peak	Spacewatch	·	1.5 km	MPC; JPL
682124	2006 CN_{74}	—	February 7, 2006	Mount Lemmon	Mount Lemmon Survey	·	2.6 km	MPC; JPL
682125	2006 CM_{77}	—	February 7, 2006	Kitt Peak	Spacewatch	·	2.9 km	MPC; JPL
682126	2006 CZ_{79}	—	January 19, 2012	Haleakala	Pan-STARRS 1	·	1.9 km	MPC; JPL
682127	2006 CJ_{82}	—	January 3, 2009	Kitt Peak	Spacewatch	·	730 m	MPC; JPL
682128	2006 CO_{84}	—	January 30, 2011	Kitt Peak	Spacewatch	EOS	1.4 km	MPC; JPL
682129	2006 CV_{84}	—	February 18, 2015	Haleakala	Pan-STARRS 1	·	990 m	MPC; JPL
682130	2006 CC_{85}	—	November 17, 2009	Mount Lemmon	Mount Lemmon Survey	·	1.1 km	MPC; JPL
682131	2006 CC_{86}	—	February 24, 2015	Haleakala	Pan-STARRS 1	·	1.0 km	MPC; JPL
682132	2006 CF_{87}	—	September 2, 2008	Kitt Peak	Spacewatch	·	1.3 km	MPC; JPL
682133	2006 CO_{87}	—	February 4, 2006	Kitt Peak	Spacewatch	EOS	1.8 km	MPC; JPL
682134	2006 CY_{87}	—	January 10, 2013	Haleakala	Pan-STARRS 1	·	520 m	MPC; JPL
682135	2006 CL_{91}	—	February 1, 2006	Kitt Peak	Spacewatch	·	1.6 km	MPC; JPL
682136	2006 CP_{91}	—	February 2, 2006	Kitt Peak	Spacewatch	T_{j} (2.99)	3.2 km	MPC; JPL
682137	2006 CE_{92}	—	January 21, 2006	Mount Lemmon	Mount Lemmon Survey	·	2.3 km	MPC; JPL
682138	2006 DF_{15}	—	February 1, 2006	Kitt Peak	Spacewatch	MAS	460 m	MPC; JPL
682139	2006 DX_{19}	—	February 20, 2006	Kitt Peak	Spacewatch	·	1.0 km	MPC; JPL
682140	2006 DM_{43}	—	February 20, 2006	Kitt Peak	Spacewatch	·	1.2 km	MPC; JPL
682141	2006 DL_{51}	—	February 1, 2006	Kitt Peak	Spacewatch	·	1.1 km	MPC; JPL
682142	2006 DS_{51}	—	February 24, 2006	Kitt Peak	Spacewatch	·	1.2 km	MPC; JPL
682143	2006 DF_{75}	—	January 31, 2006	Kitt Peak	Spacewatch	·	1.2 km	MPC; JPL
682144	2006 DW_{78}	—	February 24, 2006	Kitt Peak	Spacewatch	·	1.7 km	MPC; JPL
682145	2006 DU_{81}	—	February 24, 2006	Kitt Peak	Spacewatch	·	970 m	MPC; JPL
682146	2006 DX_{82}	—	February 24, 2006	Kitt Peak	Spacewatch	·	1.4 km	MPC; JPL
682147	2006 DH_{89}	—	February 24, 2006	Kitt Peak	Spacewatch	·	720 m	MPC; JPL
682148	2006 DO_{103}	—	February 25, 2006	Mount Lemmon	Mount Lemmon Survey	·	640 m	MPC; JPL
682149	2006 DJ_{107}	—	February 25, 2006	Mount Lemmon	Mount Lemmon Survey	·	1.2 km	MPC; JPL
682150	2006 DK_{112}	—	February 27, 2006	Mount Lemmon	Mount Lemmon Survey	·	680 m	MPC; JPL
682151	2006 DM_{115}	—	February 27, 2006	Kitt Peak	Spacewatch	·	1.2 km	MPC; JPL
682152	2006 DO_{118}	—	February 28, 2006	Mount Lemmon	Mount Lemmon Survey	EUN	1.0 km	MPC; JPL
682153	2006 DX_{125}	—	February 25, 2006	Kitt Peak	Spacewatch	·	980 m	MPC; JPL
682154	2006 DG_{126}	—	February 25, 2006	Kitt Peak	Spacewatch	·	1.4 km	MPC; JPL
682155	2006 DA_{127}	—	January 26, 2006	Kitt Peak	Spacewatch	·	1.9 km	MPC; JPL
682156	2006 DD_{127}	—	February 25, 2006	Kitt Peak	Spacewatch	EOS	1.4 km	MPC; JPL
682157	2006 DF_{127}	—	February 25, 2006	Kitt Peak	Spacewatch	·	1.4 km	MPC; JPL
682158	2006 DS_{129}	—	February 25, 2006	Kitt Peak	Spacewatch	·	900 m	MPC; JPL
682159	2006 DJ_{135}	—	February 25, 2006	Mount Lemmon	Mount Lemmon Survey	·	2.4 km	MPC; JPL
682160	2006 DK_{135}	—	February 25, 2006	Mount Lemmon	Mount Lemmon Survey	·	2.6 km	MPC; JPL
682161	2006 DL_{135}	—	January 31, 2006	Kitt Peak	Spacewatch	·	2.3 km	MPC; JPL
682162	2006 DY_{139}	—	February 25, 2006	Kitt Peak	Spacewatch	·	1.2 km	MPC; JPL
682163	2006 DE_{144}	—	February 25, 2006	Mount Lemmon	Mount Lemmon Survey	·	970 m	MPC; JPL
682164	2006 DE_{145}	—	February 25, 2006	Mount Lemmon	Mount Lemmon Survey	(7744)	1.2 km	MPC; JPL
682165	2006 DE_{146}	—	February 25, 2006	Mount Lemmon	Mount Lemmon Survey	·	580 m	MPC; JPL
682166	2006 DM_{148}	—	February 25, 2006	Kitt Peak	Spacewatch	·	2.0 km	MPC; JPL
682167	2006 DK_{154}	—	September 29, 2003	Kitt Peak	Spacewatch	·	1.6 km	MPC; JPL
682168	2006 DO_{162}	—	February 27, 2006	Mount Lemmon	Mount Lemmon Survey	·	1.2 km	MPC; JPL
682169	2006 DA_{166}	—	February 27, 2006	Kitt Peak	Spacewatch	·	960 m	MPC; JPL
682170	2006 DG_{167}	—	February 27, 2006	Kitt Peak	Spacewatch	·	1.0 km	MPC; JPL
682171	2006 DT_{175}	—	February 27, 2006	Mount Lemmon	Mount Lemmon Survey	·	2.3 km	MPC; JPL
682172	2006 DG_{177}	—	February 27, 2006	Mount Lemmon	Mount Lemmon Survey	JUN	860 m	MPC; JPL
682173	2006 DJ_{191}	—	February 27, 2006	Kitt Peak	Spacewatch	NYS	640 m	MPC; JPL
682174	2006 DN_{192}	—	July 24, 2003	Palomar	NEAT	·	1.0 km	MPC; JPL
682175	2006 DC_{194}	—	February 28, 2006	Mount Lemmon	Mount Lemmon Survey	·	640 m	MPC; JPL
682176	2006 DD_{205}	—	February 25, 2006	Mount Lemmon	Mount Lemmon Survey	·	2.5 km	MPC; JPL
682177	2006 DS_{213}	—	February 24, 2006	Catalina	CSS	T_{j} (2.99)	3.5 km	MPC; JPL
682178	2006 DN_{217}	—	January 30, 2006	Kitt Peak	Spacewatch	V	470 m	MPC; JPL
682179	2006 DD_{218}	—	February 25, 2006	Mount Lemmon	Mount Lemmon Survey	·	930 m	MPC; JPL
682180	2006 DK_{220}	—	February 24, 2006	Kitt Peak	Spacewatch	·	2.6 km	MPC; JPL
682181	2006 DV_{220}	—	June 4, 2011	Mount Lemmon	Mount Lemmon Survey	·	1.3 km	MPC; JPL
682182	2006 DL_{221}	—	April 28, 2011	Haleakala	Pan-STARRS 1	JUN	990 m	MPC; JPL
682183	2006 DD_{222}	—	September 3, 2013	Kitt Peak	Spacewatch	·	2.3 km	MPC; JPL
682184	2006 DQ_{222}	—	December 18, 2009	Mount Lemmon	Mount Lemmon Survey	·	1.1 km	MPC; JPL
682185	2006 DN_{225}	—	February 27, 2006	Mount Lemmon	Mount Lemmon Survey	·	1.0 km	MPC; JPL
682186	2006 DW_{225}	—	February 27, 2006	Kitt Peak	Spacewatch	·	640 m	MPC; JPL
682187	2006 DB_{226}	—	February 25, 2006	Mount Lemmon	Mount Lemmon Survey	·	1.1 km	MPC; JPL
682188	2006 DE_{226}	—	February 24, 2006	Kitt Peak	Spacewatch	·	930 m	MPC; JPL
682189	2006 EG_{2}	—	February 27, 2006	Kitt Peak	Spacewatch	·	2.2 km	MPC; JPL
682190	2006 EH_{4}	—	January 31, 2006	Kitt Peak	Spacewatch	·	1.1 km	MPC; JPL
682191	2006 EQ_{4}	—	March 2, 2006	Kitt Peak	Spacewatch	·	1.2 km	MPC; JPL
682192	2006 EZ_{5}	—	March 2, 2006	Kitt Peak	Spacewatch	·	1.1 km	MPC; JPL
682193	2006 EL_{8}	—	March 2, 2006	Kitt Peak	Spacewatch	·	1.8 km	MPC; JPL
682194	2006 EB_{9}	—	March 2, 2006	Kitt Peak	Spacewatch	·	1.2 km	MPC; JPL
682195	2006 EM_{11}	—	March 2, 2006	Kitt Peak	Spacewatch	MAS	540 m	MPC; JPL
682196	2006 EV_{11}	—	March 2, 2006	Kitt Peak	Spacewatch	TEL	1.2 km	MPC; JPL
682197	2006 EB_{17}	—	October 24, 2005	Mauna Kea	A. Boattini	MAS	740 m	MPC; JPL
682198	2006 EQ_{22}	—	March 3, 2006	Kitt Peak	Spacewatch	·	2.2 km	MPC; JPL
682199	2006 ET_{22}	—	March 3, 2006	Kitt Peak	Spacewatch	·	2.1 km	MPC; JPL
682200	2006 EE_{24}	—	March 3, 2006	Kitt Peak	Spacewatch	·	1.2 km	MPC; JPL

== 682201–682300 ==
back to top

Designation			Discovery			Properties		Ref
Permanent	Provisional	Named after	Date	Site	Discoverer(s)	Category	Diam.	Ref
682201	2006 EM_{24}	—	March 3, 2006	Kitt Peak	Spacewatch	EOS	1.7 km	MPC; JPL
682202	2006 EA_{26}	—	March 3, 2006	Kitt Peak	Spacewatch	HYG	1.9 km	MPC; JPL
682203	2006 EM_{27}	—	March 3, 2006	Mount Lemmon	Mount Lemmon Survey	·	900 m	MPC; JPL
682204	2006 EW_{35}	—	March 3, 2006	Mount Lemmon	Mount Lemmon Survey	·	660 m	MPC; JPL
682205	2006 EG_{36}	—	March 3, 2006	Mount Lemmon	Mount Lemmon Survey	·	1.7 km	MPC; JPL
682206	2006 EG_{46}	—	March 4, 2006	Kitt Peak	Spacewatch	·	1.5 km	MPC; JPL
682207	2006 EN_{64}	—	March 5, 2006	Kitt Peak	Spacewatch	·	1.6 km	MPC; JPL
682208	2006 EZ_{64}	—	March 5, 2006	Kitt Peak	Spacewatch	·	750 m	MPC; JPL
682209	2006 EM_{75}	—	February 18, 2015	Kitt Peak	Research and Education Collaborative Occultation Network	·	1.3 km	MPC; JPL
682210	2006 EM_{76}	—	March 23, 2012	Les Engarouines	L. Bernasconi	T_{j} (2.98) · EUP	3.6 km	MPC; JPL
682211	2006 EN_{76}	—	September 3, 2013	Mount Lemmon	Mount Lemmon Survey	L5	7.7 km	MPC; JPL
682212	2006 EY_{76}	—	February 20, 2006	Kitt Peak	Spacewatch	·	1.8 km	MPC; JPL
682213	2006 EQ_{77}	—	May 20, 2010	Mount Lemmon	Mount Lemmon Survey	·	680 m	MPC; JPL
682214	2006 EA_{78}	—	February 11, 2015	Mount Lemmon	Mount Lemmon Survey	·	1.6 km	MPC; JPL
682215	2006 EL_{78}	—	August 28, 2014	Kitt Peak	Spacewatch	·	700 m	MPC; JPL
682216	2006 EO_{78}	—	April 12, 2012	Haleakala	Pan-STARRS 1	·	2.4 km	MPC; JPL
682217	2006 EX_{78}	—	April 1, 2012	Mount Lemmon	Mount Lemmon Survey	·	2.5 km	MPC; JPL
682218	2006 EG_{79}	—	November 9, 2013	Haleakala	Pan-STARRS 1	·	1.2 km	MPC; JPL
682219	2006 EZ_{79}	—	October 28, 2014	Haleakala	Pan-STARRS 1	·	2.0 km	MPC; JPL
682220	2006 EY_{80}	—	February 17, 2015	Haleakala	Pan-STARRS 1	·	1.3 km	MPC; JPL
682221	2006 ED_{81}	—	March 4, 2006	Kitt Peak	Spacewatch	·	850 m	MPC; JPL
682222	2006 EC_{82}	—	March 4, 2006	Kitt Peak	Spacewatch	·	1.3 km	MPC; JPL
682223	2006 FS_{28}	—	March 24, 2006	Mount Lemmon	Mount Lemmon Survey	ERI	970 m	MPC; JPL
682224	2006 FK_{31}	—	March 25, 2006	Mount Lemmon	Mount Lemmon Survey	·	580 m	MPC; JPL
682225	2006 FY_{57}	—	March 3, 2006	Kitt Peak	Spacewatch	·	730 m	MPC; JPL
682226	2006 FG_{58}	—	October 8, 2008	Kitt Peak	Spacewatch	·	2.4 km	MPC; JPL
682227	2006 FT_{60}	—	March 24, 2006	Kitt Peak	Spacewatch	·	930 m	MPC; JPL
682228	2006 FQ_{61}	—	March 26, 2006	Mount Lemmon	Mount Lemmon Survey	·	1.1 km	MPC; JPL
682229	2006 GB_{9}	—	April 2, 2006	Kitt Peak	Spacewatch	·	670 m	MPC; JPL
682230	2006 GB_{21}	—	April 2, 2006	Kitt Peak	Spacewatch	·	2.1 km	MPC; JPL
682231	2006 GS_{23}	—	April 2, 2006	Kitt Peak	Spacewatch	·	2.6 km	MPC; JPL
682232	2006 GY_{28}	—	April 2, 2006	Kitt Peak	Spacewatch	·	1.4 km	MPC; JPL
682233	2006 GL_{33}	—	March 10, 2005	Mount Lemmon	Mount Lemmon Survey	3:2 · SHU	5.0 km	MPC; JPL
682234	2006 GZ_{55}	—	September 26, 2012	Mount Lemmon	Mount Lemmon Survey	·	1.5 km	MPC; JPL
682235	2006 GO_{56}	—	March 12, 2016	Mount Lemmon	Mount Lemmon Survey	H	340 m	MPC; JPL
682236	2006 GX_{56}	—	April 7, 2006	Kitt Peak	Spacewatch	NYS	950 m	MPC; JPL
682237	2006 GP_{57}	—	June 17, 2015	Haleakala	Pan-STARRS 1	·	1.1 km	MPC; JPL
682238	2006 GV_{57}	—	May 20, 2015	Mount Lemmon	Mount Lemmon Survey	·	1.4 km	MPC; JPL
682239	2006 GM_{58}	—	April 2, 2006	Kitt Peak	Spacewatch	·	2.1 km	MPC; JPL
682240	2006 GO_{58}	—	November 21, 2015	Mount Lemmon	Mount Lemmon Survey	·	640 m	MPC; JPL
682241	2006 GT_{58}	—	April 7, 2006	Kitt Peak	Spacewatch	·	660 m	MPC; JPL
682242	2006 GY_{58}	—	April 7, 2006	Mount Lemmon	Mount Lemmon Survey	·	560 m	MPC; JPL
682243	2006 HK_{10}	—	April 19, 2006	Kitt Peak	Spacewatch	·	690 m	MPC; JPL
682244	2006 HE_{13}	—	April 19, 2006	Kitt Peak	Spacewatch	·	2.5 km	MPC; JPL
682245	2006 HE_{14}	—	April 19, 2006	Mount Lemmon	Mount Lemmon Survey	·	1.9 km	MPC; JPL
682246	2006 HU_{14}	—	October 24, 2003	Kitt Peak	Spacewatch	·	2.3 km	MPC; JPL
682247	2006 HC_{18}	—	April 19, 2006	Mount Lemmon	Mount Lemmon Survey	PHO	810 m	MPC; JPL
682248	2006 HH_{32}	—	April 19, 2006	Kitt Peak	Spacewatch	·	2.2 km	MPC; JPL
682249	2006 HZ_{33}	—	April 7, 2006	Kitt Peak	Spacewatch	·	640 m	MPC; JPL
682250	2006 HM_{34}	—	September 20, 2003	Kitt Peak	Spacewatch	·	770 m	MPC; JPL
682251	2006 HQ_{46}	—	April 20, 2006	Kitt Peak	Spacewatch	·	710 m	MPC; JPL
682252	2006 HX_{47}	—	April 20, 2006	Kitt Peak	Spacewatch	·	860 m	MPC; JPL
682253	2006 HV_{61}	—	March 23, 2006	Kitt Peak	Spacewatch	NYS	670 m	MPC; JPL
682254	2006 HG_{69}	—	April 24, 2006	Mount Lemmon	Mount Lemmon Survey	MAS	570 m	MPC; JPL
682255	2006 HO_{70}	—	February 7, 2002	Kitt Peak	Spacewatch	NYS	970 m	MPC; JPL
682256	2006 HA_{73}	—	April 21, 2006	Kitt Peak	Spacewatch	EOS	1.5 km	MPC; JPL
682257	2006 HE_{77}	—	April 25, 2006	Kitt Peak	Spacewatch	·	1.8 km	MPC; JPL
682258	2006 HS_{84}	—	April 26, 2006	Kitt Peak	Spacewatch	·	730 m	MPC; JPL
682259	2006 HA_{92}	—	April 29, 2006	Kitt Peak	Spacewatch	·	1.3 km	MPC; JPL
682260	2006 HC_{96}	—	April 30, 2006	Kitt Peak	Spacewatch	MAS	560 m	MPC; JPL
682261	2006 HV_{98}	—	April 30, 2006	Kitt Peak	Spacewatch	MAR	950 m	MPC; JPL
682262	2006 HD_{104}	—	April 30, 2006	Kitt Peak	Spacewatch	·	2.2 km	MPC; JPL
682263	2006 HK_{124}	—	December 20, 2011	ESA OGS	ESA OGS	·	840 m	MPC; JPL
682264	2006 HM_{125}	—	April 27, 2006	Cerro Tololo	Deep Ecliptic Survey	·	1.2 km	MPC; JPL
682265	2006 HK_{126}	—	April 28, 2006	Cerro Tololo	Deep Ecliptic Survey	·	1.7 km	MPC; JPL
682266	2006 HT_{139}	—	April 26, 2006	Cerro Tololo	Deep Ecliptic Survey	EOS	1.6 km	MPC; JPL
682267	2006 HM_{140}	—	April 26, 2006	Cerro Tololo	Deep Ecliptic Survey	·	2.4 km	MPC; JPL
682268	2006 HV_{145}	—	April 27, 2006	Cerro Tololo	Deep Ecliptic Survey	·	2.0 km	MPC; JPL
682269	2006 HD_{148}	—	February 9, 2005	Kitt Peak	Spacewatch	·	2.0 km	MPC; JPL
682270	2006 HV_{148}	—	September 30, 2003	Kitt Peak	Spacewatch	MAS	550 m	MPC; JPL
682271	2006 HB_{155}	—	April 19, 2006	Mount Lemmon	Mount Lemmon Survey	EOS	1.4 km	MPC; JPL
682272	2006 HN_{155}	—	May 21, 2012	Haleakala	Pan-STARRS 1	HYG	2.5 km	MPC; JPL
682273	2006 HV_{155}	—	March 28, 2014	Mount Lemmon	Mount Lemmon Survey	·	1.3 km	MPC; JPL
682274	2006 HD_{157}	—	September 2, 2008	Kitt Peak	Spacewatch	·	2.5 km	MPC; JPL
682275	2006 HN_{157}	—	December 7, 2015	Haleakala	Pan-STARRS 1	PHO	880 m	MPC; JPL
682276	2006 HV_{157}	—	April 13, 2015	Mount Lemmon	Mount Lemmon Survey	·	920 m	MPC; JPL
682277	2006 HZ_{160}	—	April 29, 2006	Kitt Peak	Spacewatch	·	1.5 km	MPC; JPL
682278	2006 HC_{161}	—	April 24, 2006	Kitt Peak	Spacewatch	MAS	580 m	MPC; JPL
682279	2006 JT_{30}	—	May 3, 2006	Mount Lemmon	Mount Lemmon Survey	MAS	750 m	MPC; JPL
682280	2006 JV_{31}	—	May 3, 2006	Kitt Peak	Spacewatch	·	1.8 km	MPC; JPL
682281	2006 JQ_{40}	—	April 21, 2006	Kitt Peak	Spacewatch	·	3.0 km	MPC; JPL
682282	2006 JJ_{46}	—	May 5, 2006	Kitt Peak	Spacewatch	H	420 m	MPC; JPL
682283	2006 JJ_{51}	—	April 20, 2006	Kitt Peak	Spacewatch	·	2.6 km	MPC; JPL
682284	2006 JQ_{63}	—	March 2, 2006	Mount Lemmon	Mount Lemmon Survey	·	630 m	MPC; JPL
682285	2006 JE_{67}	—	April 28, 2006	Cerro Tololo	Deep Ecliptic Survey	·	2.5 km	MPC; JPL
682286	2006 JJ_{67}	—	April 28, 2006	Cerro Tololo	Deep Ecliptic Survey	·	1.4 km	MPC; JPL
682287	2006 JF_{69}	—	March 25, 2006	Kitt Peak	Spacewatch	·	1.1 km	MPC; JPL
682288	2006 JV_{71}	—	May 1, 2006	Mauna Kea	P. A. Wiegert	·	1.5 km	MPC; JPL
682289	2006 JD_{76}	—	May 1, 2006	Mauna Kea	P. A. Wiegert	·	920 m	MPC; JPL
682290	2006 JK_{76}	—	May 31, 2006	Mount Lemmon	Mount Lemmon Survey	·	2.4 km	MPC; JPL
682291	2006 JZ_{77}	—	April 19, 2006	Mount Lemmon	Mount Lemmon Survey	EUP	3.1 km	MPC; JPL
682292	2006 JX_{82}	—	January 14, 2016	Haleakala	Pan-STARRS 1	·	2.7 km	MPC; JPL
682293	2006 JG_{84}	—	November 2, 2012	Haleakala	Pan-STARRS 1	GAL	1.6 km	MPC; JPL
682294	2006 JL_{84}	—	September 25, 2012	Mount Lemmon	Mount Lemmon Survey	·	1.4 km	MPC; JPL
682295	2006 JD_{85}	—	August 26, 1998	Kitt Peak	Spacewatch	·	1.5 km	MPC; JPL
682296	2006 JT_{87}	—	September 24, 2008	Kitt Peak	Spacewatch	·	1.8 km	MPC; JPL
682297	2006 JQ_{88}	—	September 29, 2003	Kitt Peak	Spacewatch	·	1.2 km	MPC; JPL
682298	2006 JY_{89}	—	May 6, 2006	Kitt Peak	Spacewatch	·	1.4 km	MPC; JPL
682299	2006 KH_{18}	—	May 21, 2006	Kitt Peak	Spacewatch	EOS	1.8 km	MPC; JPL
682300	2006 KZ_{22}	—	May 21, 2006	Mount Lemmon	Mount Lemmon Survey	·	1.1 km	MPC; JPL

== 682301–682400 ==
back to top

Designation			Discovery			Properties		Ref
Permanent	Provisional	Named after	Date	Site	Discoverer(s)	Category	Diam.	Ref
682301	2006 KU_{25}	—	May 19, 2006	Mount Lemmon	Mount Lemmon Survey	·	1.5 km	MPC; JPL
682302	2006 KH_{27}	—	May 20, 2006	Mount Lemmon	Mount Lemmon Survey	·	1.7 km	MPC; JPL
682303	2006 KH_{29}	—	May 20, 2006	Kitt Peak	Spacewatch	·	710 m	MPC; JPL
682304	2006 KN_{32}	—	May 20, 2006	Kitt Peak	Spacewatch	·	1.3 km	MPC; JPL
682305	2006 KR_{33}	—	May 20, 2006	Kitt Peak	Spacewatch	·	3.0 km	MPC; JPL
682306	2006 KH_{34}	—	November 18, 1998	La Palma	A. Fitzsimmons, R. Budden	·	1.2 km	MPC; JPL
682307	2006 KZ_{40}	—	October 20, 2012	Kitt Peak	Spacewatch	·	1.3 km	MPC; JPL
682308	2006 KA_{45}	—	May 21, 2006	Kitt Peak	Spacewatch	·	1.4 km	MPC; JPL
682309	2006 KV_{45}	—	May 21, 2006	Mount Lemmon	Mount Lemmon Survey	·	1.2 km	MPC; JPL
682310	2006 KP_{54}	—	May 21, 2006	Kitt Peak	Spacewatch	·	1.4 km	MPC; JPL
682311	2006 KT_{54}	—	May 21, 2006	Kitt Peak	Spacewatch	·	1.6 km	MPC; JPL
682312	2006 KG_{70}	—	May 22, 2006	Kitt Peak	Spacewatch	·	2.1 km	MPC; JPL
682313	2006 KY_{74}	—	May 23, 2006	Kitt Peak	Spacewatch	·	820 m	MPC; JPL
682314	2006 KD_{78}	—	May 24, 2006	Mount Lemmon	Mount Lemmon Survey	·	2.7 km	MPC; JPL
682315	2006 KB_{80}	—	May 25, 2006	Mount Lemmon	Mount Lemmon Survey	·	2.4 km	MPC; JPL
682316	2006 KL_{87}	—	May 24, 2006	Kitt Peak	Spacewatch	·	1.1 km	MPC; JPL
682317	2006 KL_{88}	—	May 24, 2006	Kitt Peak	Spacewatch	·	1.5 km	MPC; JPL
682318	2006 KJ_{92}	—	May 25, 2006	Kitt Peak	Spacewatch	(5)	1.3 km	MPC; JPL
682319	2006 KD_{95}	—	May 25, 2006	Kitt Peak	Spacewatch	·	1.6 km	MPC; JPL
682320	2006 KA_{98}	—	May 26, 2006	Kitt Peak	Spacewatch	·	3.3 km	MPC; JPL
682321	2006 KX_{105}	—	April 24, 2006	Anderson Mesa	LONEOS	PHO	1.2 km	MPC; JPL
682322	2006 KC_{112}	—	May 23, 2006	Mount Lemmon	Mount Lemmon Survey	·	2.4 km	MPC; JPL
682323	2006 KN_{112}	—	May 7, 2006	Kitt Peak	Spacewatch	·	1.2 km	MPC; JPL
682324	2006 KJ_{116}	—	May 20, 2006	Kitt Peak	Spacewatch	·	700 m	MPC; JPL
682325	2006 KX_{117}	—	May 31, 2006	Mount Lemmon	Mount Lemmon Survey	·	2.6 km	MPC; JPL
682326	2006 KK_{127}	—	May 25, 2006	Mauna Kea	P. A. Wiegert	3:2	4.5 km	MPC; JPL
682327	2006 KM_{127}	—	May 25, 2006	Mauna Kea	P. A. Wiegert	·	750 m	MPC; JPL
682328	2006 KQ_{127}	—	May 25, 2006	Mauna Kea	P. A. Wiegert	·	1.5 km	MPC; JPL
682329	2006 KX_{129}	—	May 25, 2006	Mauna Kea	P. A. Wiegert	·	1.4 km	MPC; JPL
682330	2006 KP_{130}	—	May 25, 2006	Mauna Kea	P. A. Wiegert	·	1.4 km	MPC; JPL
682331	2006 KL_{134}	—	May 23, 2006	Mount Lemmon	Mount Lemmon Survey	·	1.4 km	MPC; JPL
682332	2006 KW_{139}	—	May 25, 2006	Mauna Kea	P. A. Wiegert	·	2.5 km	MPC; JPL
682333	2006 KW_{145}	—	February 6, 2014	Mount Lemmon	Mount Lemmon Survey	WIT	860 m	MPC; JPL
682334	2006 KL_{146}	—	May 25, 2006	Mount Lemmon	Mount Lemmon Survey	·	1.7 km	MPC; JPL
682335	2006 KO_{146}	—	December 13, 2015	Haleakala	Pan-STARRS 1	·	3.3 km	MPC; JPL
682336	2006 KS_{147}	—	May 29, 2006	Kitt Peak	Spacewatch	·	2.2 km	MPC; JPL
682337	2006 KD_{148}	—	February 23, 2015	Haleakala	Pan-STARRS 1	MRX	780 m	MPC; JPL
682338	2006 KK_{148}	—	May 24, 2006	Kitt Peak	Spacewatch	PHO	700 m	MPC; JPL
682339	2006 KX_{148}	—	May 23, 2006	Kitt Peak	Spacewatch	·	2.8 km	MPC; JPL
682340	2006 KY_{148}	—	May 21, 2006	Kitt Peak	Spacewatch	HYG	2.4 km	MPC; JPL
682341	2006 KK_{149}	—	May 22, 2006	Mount Lemmon	Mount Lemmon Survey	·	2.5 km	MPC; JPL
682342	2006 KL_{150}	—	April 12, 2011	Mount Lemmon	Mount Lemmon Survey	·	2.6 km	MPC; JPL
682343	2006 KW_{151}	—	November 12, 2012	Mount Lemmon	Mount Lemmon Survey	H	440 m	MPC; JPL
682344	2006 KF_{152}	—	November 19, 2014	Haleakala	Pan-STARRS 1	VER	2.5 km	MPC; JPL
682345	2006 KW_{153}	—	October 8, 2007	Mount Lemmon	Mount Lemmon Survey	·	1.0 km	MPC; JPL
682346	2006 KO_{154}	—	May 20, 2006	Kitt Peak	Spacewatch	·	2.4 km	MPC; JPL
682347	2006 KK_{155}	—	May 23, 2006	Kitt Peak	Spacewatch	·	1.4 km	MPC; JPL
682348	2006 KZ_{155}	—	May 21, 2006	Kitt Peak	Spacewatch	·	1.3 km	MPC; JPL
682349	2006 KJ_{156}	—	June 4, 2006	Mount Lemmon	Mount Lemmon Survey	·	890 m	MPC; JPL
682350	2006 KK_{156}	—	May 25, 2006	Mount Lemmon	Mount Lemmon Survey	NYS	950 m	MPC; JPL
682351	2006 LT_{8}	—	May 8, 2014	Haleakala	Pan-STARRS 1	EUN	870 m	MPC; JPL
682352	2006 LB_{9}	—	November 2, 2008	Mount Lemmon	Mount Lemmon Survey	EOS	1.6 km	MPC; JPL
682353	2006 LH_{9}	—	October 12, 2016	Haleakala	Pan-STARRS 1	·	1.7 km	MPC; JPL
682354	2006 MU_{2}	—	May 24, 2006	Kitt Peak	Spacewatch	PHO	740 m	MPC; JPL
682355	2006 MW_{5}	—	May 24, 2006	Kitt Peak	Spacewatch	MAR	980 m	MPC; JPL
682356	2006 MC_{10}	—	June 21, 2006	Kitt Peak	Spacewatch	·	760 m	MPC; JPL
682357	2006 MY_{15}	—	August 14, 2013	Haleakala	Pan-STARRS 1	·	2.8 km	MPC; JPL
682358	2006 MG_{16}	—	July 8, 2018	Haleakala	Pan-STARRS 2	·	2.3 km	MPC; JPL
682359	2006 NA_{1}	—	July 2, 2006	Bergisch Gladbach	W. Bickel	·	3.0 km	MPC; JPL
682360	2006 OX_{3}	—	July 21, 2006	Mount Lemmon	Mount Lemmon Survey	·	1.0 km	MPC; JPL
682361	2006 OM_{8}	—	June 8, 2002	Kitt Peak	Spacewatch	·	1.0 km	MPC; JPL
682362	2006 OS_{17}	—	July 18, 2006	Siding Spring	SSS	TIN	790 m	MPC; JPL
682363	2006 OX_{22}	—	June 18, 2006	Kitt Peak	Spacewatch	·	1.1 km	MPC; JPL
682364	2006 OA_{25}	—	July 21, 2006	Mount Lemmon	Mount Lemmon Survey	AGN	1.1 km	MPC; JPL
682365	2006 OU_{26}	—	July 21, 2006	Mount Lemmon	Mount Lemmon Survey	·	1.4 km	MPC; JPL
682366	2006 OR_{27}	—	November 13, 2007	Kitt Peak	Spacewatch	·	1.3 km	MPC; JPL
682367	2006 OS_{32}	—	July 19, 2006	Mauna Kea	P. A. Wiegert, D. Subasinghe	·	2.4 km	MPC; JPL
682368	2006 OG_{36}	—	July 19, 2006	Mauna Kea	P. A. Wiegert, D. Subasinghe	·	1.4 km	MPC; JPL
682369	2006 OO_{39}	—	April 15, 2013	Haleakala	Pan-STARRS 1	NYS	790 m	MPC; JPL
682370	2006 PA_{2}	—	June 3, 2006	Mount Lemmon	Mount Lemmon Survey	·	1.7 km	MPC; JPL
682371	2006 PN_{5}	—	August 12, 2006	Palomar	NEAT	DOR	2.4 km	MPC; JPL
682372	2006 PV_{15}	—	August 17, 2006	Palomar	NEAT	·	3.8 km	MPC; JPL
682373	2006 PY_{25}	—	August 13, 2006	Palomar	NEAT	·	1.1 km	MPC; JPL
682374	2006 PH_{26}	—	August 15, 2006	Palomar	NEAT	·	1.0 km	MPC; JPL
682375	2006 QF_{34}	—	July 20, 2006	Palomar	NEAT	·	1.5 km	MPC; JPL
682376	2006 QM_{40}	—	August 25, 2006	Pla D'Arguines	R. Ferrando, Ferrando, M.	·	1.7 km	MPC; JPL
682377	2006 QG_{42}	—	August 17, 2006	Palomar	NEAT	·	1.1 km	MPC; JPL
682378	2006 QR_{44}	—	August 19, 2006	Anderson Mesa	LONEOS	PHO	640 m	MPC; JPL
682379	2006 QK_{68}	—	August 21, 2006	Kitt Peak	Spacewatch	KOR	960 m	MPC; JPL
682380	2006 QQ_{71}	—	August 21, 2006	Kitt Peak	Spacewatch	·	1.3 km	MPC; JPL
682381	2006 QA_{73}	—	August 21, 2006	Kitt Peak	Spacewatch	·	1.9 km	MPC; JPL
682382	2006 QE_{75}	—	August 21, 2006	Kitt Peak	Spacewatch	KOR	1.2 km	MPC; JPL
682383	2006 QC_{83}	—	August 19, 2006	Kitt Peak	Spacewatch	·	1.6 km	MPC; JPL
682384	2006 QG_{86}	—	August 19, 2006	Kitt Peak	Spacewatch	KOR	1.1 km	MPC; JPL
682385	2006 QQ_{87}	—	August 27, 2006	Kitt Peak	Spacewatch	·	920 m	MPC; JPL
682386	2006 QO_{89}	—	August 29, 2006	Wrightwood	J. W. Young	AGN	980 m	MPC; JPL
682387	2006 QM_{94}	—	August 19, 2006	Kitt Peak	Spacewatch	·	920 m	MPC; JPL
682388	2006 QL_{97}	—	July 21, 2006	Catalina	CSS	·	3.7 km	MPC; JPL
682389	2006 QJ_{100}	—	August 24, 2006	Palomar	NEAT	H	620 m	MPC; JPL
682390	2006 QH_{105}	—	September 19, 2003	Kitt Peak	Spacewatch	·	1.1 km	MPC; JPL
682391	2006 QL_{109}	—	August 28, 2006	Kitt Peak	Spacewatch	EUN	760 m	MPC; JPL
682392	2006 QG_{112}	—	August 23, 2006	Palomar	NEAT	·	2.6 km	MPC; JPL
682393	2006 QU_{124}	—	August 5, 2006	Lulin	LUSS	·	790 m	MPC; JPL
682394	2006 QD_{139}	—	August 17, 2006	Palomar	NEAT	·	920 m	MPC; JPL
682395	2006 QE_{142}	—	August 19, 2006	Kitt Peak	Spacewatch	·	1.1 km	MPC; JPL
682396	2006 QE_{149}	—	August 18, 2006	Kitt Peak	Spacewatch	·	1.1 km	MPC; JPL
682397	2006 QN_{150}	—	August 19, 2006	Kitt Peak	Spacewatch	·	1.6 km	MPC; JPL
682398	2006 QQ_{163}	—	August 19, 2006	Kitt Peak	Spacewatch	EOS	1.7 km	MPC; JPL
682399	2006 QC_{176}	—	August 22, 2006	Cerro Tololo	Deep Ecliptic Survey	·	1.7 km	MPC; JPL
682400	2006 QM_{177}	—	August 29, 2006	Catalina	CSS	·	1.5 km	MPC; JPL

== 682401–682500 ==
back to top

Designation			Discovery			Properties		Ref
Permanent	Provisional	Named after	Date	Site	Discoverer(s)	Category	Diam.	Ref
682401	2006 QX_{188}	—	February 28, 2009	Kitt Peak	Spacewatch	KOR	1.3 km	MPC; JPL
682402	2006 QW_{190}	—	January 4, 2014	Haleakala	Pan-STARRS 1	·	2.2 km	MPC; JPL
682403	2006 QO_{191}	—	October 11, 2010	Mount Lemmon	Mount Lemmon Survey	·	1.0 km	MPC; JPL
682404	2006 QO_{194}	—	August 28, 2006	Kitt Peak	Spacewatch	·	1.4 km	MPC; JPL
682405	2006 QS_{196}	—	November 15, 2007	Mount Lemmon	Mount Lemmon Survey	·	1.6 km	MPC; JPL
682406	2006 QF_{200}	—	March 24, 2014	Haleakala	Pan-STARRS 1	·	2.1 km	MPC; JPL
682407	2006 QU_{201}	—	September 18, 2011	Mount Lemmon	Mount Lemmon Survey	KOR	1.0 km	MPC; JPL
682408	2006 QU_{202}	—	August 18, 2006	Kitt Peak	Spacewatch	V	490 m	MPC; JPL
682409	2006 QE_{203}	—	August 28, 2006	Kitt Peak	Spacewatch	·	1.4 km	MPC; JPL
682410	2006 QL_{204}	—	August 29, 2006	Kitt Peak	Spacewatch	DOR	1.8 km	MPC; JPL
682411	2006 QT_{205}	—	August 19, 2006	Kitt Peak	Spacewatch	·	1.4 km	MPC; JPL
682412	2006 QR_{206}	—	August 28, 2006	Kitt Peak	Spacewatch	·	810 m	MPC; JPL
682413	2006 QT_{207}	—	August 21, 2006	Kitt Peak	Spacewatch	·	1.7 km	MPC; JPL
682414	2006 RQ_{12}	—	September 14, 2006	Kitt Peak	Spacewatch	·	1.9 km	MPC; JPL
682415	2006 RC_{13}	—	September 14, 2006	Kitt Peak	Spacewatch	·	1.9 km	MPC; JPL
682416	2006 RD_{14}	—	September 14, 2006	Kitt Peak	Spacewatch	·	960 m	MPC; JPL
682417	2006 RG_{25}	—	August 29, 2006	Kitt Peak	Spacewatch	·	1.5 km	MPC; JPL
682418	2006 RT_{25}	—	August 29, 2006	Kitt Peak	Spacewatch	·	1.3 km	MPC; JPL
682419	2006 RM_{38}	—	September 13, 2006	Palomar	NEAT	·	1.2 km	MPC; JPL
682420	2006 RU_{47}	—	September 14, 2006	Palomar	NEAT	·	960 m	MPC; JPL
682421	2006 RR_{51}	—	September 14, 2006	Kitt Peak	Spacewatch	·	590 m	MPC; JPL
682422	2006 RV_{69}	—	September 15, 2006	Kitt Peak	Spacewatch	NYS	920 m	MPC; JPL
682423	2006 RW_{69}	—	September 15, 2006	Kitt Peak	Spacewatch	KOR	1.3 km	MPC; JPL
682424	2006 RJ_{76}	—	September 15, 2006	Kitt Peak	Spacewatch	MAS	530 m	MPC; JPL
682425	2006 RD_{79}	—	September 15, 2006	Kitt Peak	Spacewatch	KOR	1.2 km	MPC; JPL
682426	2006 RX_{82}	—	September 15, 2006	Kitt Peak	Spacewatch	H	390 m	MPC; JPL
682427	2006 RR_{106}	—	September 14, 2006	Mauna Kea	Masiero, J., R. Jedicke	·	710 m	MPC; JPL
682428	2006 RW_{106}	—	September 14, 2006	Mauna Kea	J. Masiero, R. Jedicke	AGN	910 m	MPC; JPL
682429	2006 RZ_{106}	—	September 14, 2006	Mauna Kea	Masiero, J., R. Jedicke	·	910 m	MPC; JPL
682430	2006 RK_{113}	—	September 26, 2006	Mount Lemmon	Mount Lemmon Survey	·	1.4 km	MPC; JPL
682431	2006 RF_{126}	—	September 15, 2006	Kitt Peak	Spacewatch	·	1.3 km	MPC; JPL
682432	2006 RH_{126}	—	September 14, 2006	Kitt Peak	Spacewatch	H	390 m	MPC; JPL
682433	2006 SG_{2}	—	September 16, 2006	Catalina	CSS	·	2.2 km	MPC; JPL
682434	2006 SX_{9}	—	September 16, 2006	Kitt Peak	Spacewatch	·	3.8 km	MPC; JPL
682435	2006 ST_{19}	—	September 18, 2006	Vallemare Borbona	V. S. Casulli	·	1.6 km	MPC; JPL
682436	2006 SY_{30}	—	August 29, 2006	Kitt Peak	Spacewatch	·	1.6 km	MPC; JPL
682437	2006 SW_{44}	—	August 18, 2006	Palomar	NEAT	·	1.8 km	MPC; JPL
682438	2006 SN_{61}	—	September 16, 2006	Catalina	CSS	·	980 m	MPC; JPL
682439	2006 SX_{67}	—	September 19, 2006	Kitt Peak	Spacewatch	·	960 m	MPC; JPL
682440	2006 SW_{91}	—	September 18, 2006	Kitt Peak	Spacewatch	·	1.5 km	MPC; JPL
682441	2006 SO_{100}	—	September 19, 2006	Kitt Peak	Spacewatch	EOS	1.1 km	MPC; JPL
682442	2006 SG_{114}	—	September 23, 2006	Kitt Peak	Spacewatch	·	1.2 km	MPC; JPL
682443	2006 SX_{120}	—	September 18, 2006	Catalina	CSS	·	670 m	MPC; JPL
682444	2006 SX_{138}	—	September 21, 2006	Anderson Mesa	LONEOS	·	1.4 km	MPC; JPL
682445	2006 SS_{146}	—	September 19, 2006	Kitt Peak	Spacewatch	·	1.4 km	MPC; JPL
682446	2006 SS_{147}	—	September 19, 2006	Kitt Peak	Spacewatch	KOR	1.0 km	MPC; JPL
682447	2006 SK_{180}	—	September 15, 2006	Kitt Peak	Spacewatch	·	1.5 km	MPC; JPL
682448	2006 SH_{189}	—	September 18, 2006	Kitt Peak	Spacewatch	·	1.3 km	MPC; JPL
682449	2006 SQ_{189}	—	September 26, 2006	Kitt Peak	Spacewatch	BAP	670 m	MPC; JPL
682450	2006 SS_{190}	—	September 26, 2006	Mount Lemmon	Mount Lemmon Survey	MAS	570 m	MPC; JPL
682451	2006 SZ_{193}	—	September 19, 2006	Kitt Peak	Spacewatch	KOR	1.1 km	MPC; JPL
682452	2006 SJ_{203}	—	September 16, 2006	Kitt Peak	Spacewatch	·	1.0 km	MPC; JPL
682453	2006 SN_{204}	—	September 25, 2006	Kitt Peak	Spacewatch	·	890 m	MPC; JPL
682454	2006 SP_{208}	—	September 18, 2006	Anderson Mesa	LONEOS	·	1.1 km	MPC; JPL
682455	2006 SG_{210}	—	September 26, 2006	Mount Lemmon	Mount Lemmon Survey	SYL	3.2 km	MPC; JPL
682456	2006 SX_{210}	—	March 17, 2005	Mount Lemmon	Mount Lemmon Survey	·	1.2 km	MPC; JPL
682457	2006 SA_{219}	—	September 26, 2006	Piszkéstető	K. Sárneczky, B. Csák	·	1.7 km	MPC; JPL
682458	2006 SU_{233}	—	September 26, 2006	Kitt Peak	Spacewatch	·	1.4 km	MPC; JPL
682459	2006 SG_{235}	—	September 26, 2006	Kitt Peak	Spacewatch	·	1.4 km	MPC; JPL
682460	2006 SV_{236}	—	September 26, 2006	Mount Lemmon	Mount Lemmon Survey	·	1.5 km	MPC; JPL
682461	2006 SD_{248}	—	September 26, 2006	Mount Lemmon	Mount Lemmon Survey	·	1.4 km	MPC; JPL
682462	2006 SQ_{253}	—	September 18, 2006	Kitt Peak	Spacewatch	MAS	560 m	MPC; JPL
682463	2006 SO_{255}	—	September 26, 2006	Mount Lemmon	Mount Lemmon Survey	NEM	1.8 km	MPC; JPL
682464	2006 ST_{259}	—	September 26, 2006	Mount Lemmon	Mount Lemmon Survey	·	1.4 km	MPC; JPL
682465	2006 ST_{263}	—	September 26, 2006	Kitt Peak	Spacewatch	·	1.8 km	MPC; JPL
682466	2006 SJ_{266}	—	September 26, 2006	Kitt Peak	Spacewatch	·	1.6 km	MPC; JPL
682467	2006 SL_{271}	—	September 27, 2006	Mount Lemmon	Mount Lemmon Survey	·	810 m	MPC; JPL
682468	2006 SV_{282}	—	September 25, 2006	Anderson Mesa	LONEOS	·	890 m	MPC; JPL
682469	2006 SB_{293}	—	September 25, 2006	Kitt Peak	Spacewatch	·	970 m	MPC; JPL
682470	2006 SM_{293}	—	September 25, 2006	Kitt Peak	Spacewatch	·	910 m	MPC; JPL
682471	2006 SG_{301}	—	September 26, 2006	Mount Lemmon	Mount Lemmon Survey	·	1.6 km	MPC; JPL
682472	2006 SG_{309}	—	September 27, 2006	Kitt Peak	Spacewatch	·	2.8 km	MPC; JPL
682473	2006 SK_{309}	—	September 17, 2006	Kitt Peak	Spacewatch	·	1.6 km	MPC; JPL
682474	2006 SG_{311}	—	September 17, 2006	Kitt Peak	Spacewatch	·	1.5 km	MPC; JPL
682475	2006 SL_{311}	—	September 27, 2006	Kitt Peak	Spacewatch	EOS	1.3 km	MPC; JPL
682476	2006 SV_{319}	—	September 27, 2006	Kitt Peak	Spacewatch	·	1.1 km	MPC; JPL
682477	2006 SU_{323}	—	September 17, 2006	Kitt Peak	Spacewatch	·	910 m	MPC; JPL
682478	2006 SH_{325}	—	September 27, 2006	Kitt Peak	Spacewatch	·	950 m	MPC; JPL
682479	2006 SB_{330}	—	September 27, 2006	Kitt Peak	Spacewatch	·	480 m	MPC; JPL
682480	2006 SJ_{333}	—	September 28, 2006	Kitt Peak	Spacewatch	·	2.0 km	MPC; JPL
682481	2006 SZ_{340}	—	September 28, 2006	Kitt Peak	Spacewatch	·	970 m	MPC; JPL
682482	2006 SS_{346}	—	September 28, 2006	Kitt Peak	Spacewatch	SYL	3.4 km	MPC; JPL
682483	2006 SD_{355}	—	September 30, 2006	Mount Lemmon	Mount Lemmon Survey	KOR	1.1 km	MPC; JPL
682484	2006 SE_{355}	—	September 30, 2006	Mount Lemmon	Mount Lemmon Survey	·	1.1 km	MPC; JPL
682485	2006 SA_{371}	—	September 14, 2006	Kitt Peak	Spacewatch	·	1.6 km	MPC; JPL
682486	2006 SB_{375}	—	September 16, 2006	Apache Point	SDSS Collaboration	·	1.0 km	MPC; JPL
682487	2006 SR_{383}	—	September 16, 2006	Apache Point	SDSS Collaboration	·	1.6 km	MPC; JPL
682488	2006 SN_{384}	—	September 29, 2006	Apache Point	SDSS Collaboration	·	1.8 km	MPC; JPL
682489	2006 SK_{388}	—	September 16, 2006	Apache Point	SDSS Collaboration	·	1.9 km	MPC; JPL
682490	2006 SH_{395}	—	September 30, 2006	Kitt Peak	Spacewatch	KOR	1.1 km	MPC; JPL
682491	2006 SK_{395}	—	September 17, 2006	Mauna Kea	Masiero, J., R. Jedicke	KOR	980 m	MPC; JPL
682492	2006 SJ_{416}	—	September 26, 2006	Kitt Peak	Spacewatch	PAD	1.4 km	MPC; JPL
682493	2006 SD_{422}	—	September 18, 2006	Kitt Peak	Spacewatch	MAS	630 m	MPC; JPL
682494	2006 SE_{422}	—	September 26, 2006	Mount Lemmon	Mount Lemmon Survey	MAS	590 m	MPC; JPL
682495	2006 SO_{425}	—	September 14, 2006	Kitt Peak	Spacewatch	HYG	2.4 km	MPC; JPL
682496	2006 SV_{428}	—	October 31, 2010	Mount Lemmon	Mount Lemmon Survey	·	920 m	MPC; JPL
682497	2006 SS_{437}	—	October 17, 2012	Haleakala	Pan-STARRS 1	·	2.1 km	MPC; JPL
682498	2006 SM_{439}	—	March 5, 2013	Haleakala	Pan-STARRS 1	·	1.5 km	MPC; JPL
682499	2006 SR_{439}	—	March 24, 2009	Mount Lemmon	Mount Lemmon Survey	·	1.8 km	MPC; JPL
682500	2006 SA_{440}	—	September 28, 2006	Kitt Peak	Spacewatch	·	1.3 km	MPC; JPL

== 682501–682600 ==
back to top

Designation			Discovery			Properties		Ref
Permanent	Provisional	Named after	Date	Site	Discoverer(s)	Category	Diam.	Ref
682501	2006 SR_{441}	—	May 27, 2014	Haleakala	Pan-STARRS 1	·	1.3 km	MPC; JPL
682502	2006 SZ_{442}	—	January 12, 2013	Mount Lemmon	Mount Lemmon Survey	·	1.5 km	MPC; JPL
682503	2006 SZ_{445}	—	September 30, 2006	Mount Lemmon	Mount Lemmon Survey	·	430 m	MPC; JPL
682504	2006 SL_{449}	—	September 28, 2006	Kitt Peak	Spacewatch	·	760 m	MPC; JPL
682505	2006 SX_{456}	—	September 19, 2006	Kitt Peak	Spacewatch	·	1.3 km	MPC; JPL
682506	2006 SB_{457}	—	September 18, 2006	Kitt Peak	Spacewatch	·	1.8 km	MPC; JPL
682507	2006 SK_{459}	—	September 26, 2006	Mount Lemmon	Mount Lemmon Survey	KOR	1.2 km	MPC; JPL
682508	2006 SN_{459}	—	September 17, 2006	Kitt Peak	Spacewatch	·	1.6 km	MPC; JPL
682509	2006 SQ_{462}	—	September 27, 2006	Kitt Peak	Spacewatch	·	1.3 km	MPC; JPL
682510	2006 TL_{2}	—	October 2, 2006	Mount Lemmon	Mount Lemmon Survey	·	1.4 km	MPC; JPL
682511	2006 TW_{27}	—	September 27, 2006	Mount Lemmon	Mount Lemmon Survey	GEF	1.1 km	MPC; JPL
682512	2006 TK_{30}	—	September 25, 2006	Mount Lemmon	Mount Lemmon Survey	·	800 m	MPC; JPL
682513	2006 TP_{60}	—	October 14, 2006	Bergisch Gladbach	W. Bickel	·	1.4 km	MPC; JPL
682514	2006 TB_{87}	—	October 13, 2006	Kitt Peak	Spacewatch	·	1.6 km	MPC; JPL
682515	2006 TW_{88}	—	October 13, 2006	Kitt Peak	Spacewatch	NAE	1.9 km	MPC; JPL
682516	2006 TW_{97}	—	October 13, 2006	Kitt Peak	Spacewatch	V	510 m	MPC; JPL
682517	2006 TX_{97}	—	September 27, 2006	Mount Lemmon	Mount Lemmon Survey	·	1.0 km	MPC; JPL
682518	2006 TN_{101}	—	October 2, 2006	Mount Lemmon	Mount Lemmon Survey	·	570 m	MPC; JPL
682519	2006 TV_{112}	—	October 1, 2006	Apache Point	SDSS Collaboration	MAR	640 m	MPC; JPL
682520	2006 TW_{117}	—	September 18, 2006	Apache Point	SDSS Collaboration	·	1.6 km	MPC; JPL
682521	2006 TE_{121}	—	October 12, 2006	Apache Point	SDSS Collaboration	·	1.2 km	MPC; JPL
682522	2006 TA_{124}	—	October 2, 2006	Mount Lemmon	Mount Lemmon Survey	·	1.1 km	MPC; JPL
682523	2006 TG_{125}	—	October 12, 2006	Palomar	NEAT	·	1.7 km	MPC; JPL
682524	2006 TM_{127}	—	October 13, 2006	Kitt Peak	Spacewatch	·	630 m	MPC; JPL
682525	2006 TP_{128}	—	September 19, 2006	Kitt Peak	Spacewatch	·	1.5 km	MPC; JPL
682526	2006 TH_{133}	—	October 4, 2006	Mount Lemmon	Mount Lemmon Survey	·	760 m	MPC; JPL
682527	2006 TV_{134}	—	October 9, 2016	Mount Lemmon	Mount Lemmon Survey	·	1.7 km	MPC; JPL
682528	2006 TV_{136}	—	December 22, 2012	Haleakala	Pan-STARRS 1	·	1.5 km	MPC; JPL
682529	2006 TF_{139}	—	April 5, 2014	Haleakala	Pan-STARRS 1	EOS	1.5 km	MPC; JPL
682530	2006 TG_{140}	—	October 2, 2006	Kitt Peak	Spacewatch	·	900 m	MPC; JPL
682531	2006 TJ_{140}	—	October 13, 2006	Kitt Peak	Spacewatch	·	930 m	MPC; JPL
682532	2006 TK_{142}	—	October 13, 2006	Kitt Peak	Spacewatch	AGN	1 km	MPC; JPL
682533	2006 TM_{143}	—	October 2, 2006	Mount Lemmon	Mount Lemmon Survey	·	1.6 km	MPC; JPL
682534	2006 TM_{144}	—	October 2, 2006	Mount Lemmon	Mount Lemmon Survey	·	1.3 km	MPC; JPL
682535	2006 TP_{144}	—	October 4, 2006	Mount Lemmon	Mount Lemmon Survey	V	490 m	MPC; JPL
682536	2006 UP_{9}	—	October 16, 2006	Kitt Peak	Spacewatch	·	520 m	MPC; JPL
682537	2006 UN_{10}	—	October 2, 2006	Mount Lemmon	Mount Lemmon Survey	V	490 m	MPC; JPL
682538	2006 UL_{21}	—	October 16, 2006	Kitt Peak	Spacewatch	·	1.0 km	MPC; JPL
682539	2006 UX_{22}	—	August 28, 2006	Kitt Peak	Spacewatch	·	1.5 km	MPC; JPL
682540	2006 UR_{28}	—	October 16, 2006	Kitt Peak	Spacewatch	·	760 m	MPC; JPL
682541	2006 UL_{34}	—	October 16, 2006	Kitt Peak	Spacewatch	·	1.4 km	MPC; JPL
682542	2006 UX_{48}	—	October 17, 2006	Kitt Peak	Spacewatch	·	1.6 km	MPC; JPL
682543	2006 UO_{51}	—	October 17, 2006	Kitt Peak	Spacewatch	V	570 m	MPC; JPL
682544	2006 UF_{88}	—	September 25, 2006	Mount Lemmon	Mount Lemmon Survey	·	2.0 km	MPC; JPL
682545	2006 UJ_{89}	—	October 17, 2006	Kitt Peak	Spacewatch	·	1.5 km	MPC; JPL
682546	2006 UE_{98}	—	October 2, 2006	Mount Lemmon	Mount Lemmon Survey	EOS	1.4 km	MPC; JPL
682547	2006 UB_{101}	—	October 18, 2006	Kitt Peak	Spacewatch	AGN	1.1 km	MPC; JPL
682548	2006 UZ_{101}	—	October 18, 2006	Kitt Peak	Spacewatch	·	810 m	MPC; JPL
682549	2006 UC_{112}	—	August 21, 2006	Kitt Peak	Spacewatch	·	970 m	MPC; JPL
682550	2006 UH_{115}	—	September 27, 2006	Kitt Peak	Spacewatch	·	1.3 km	MPC; JPL
682551	2006 UP_{116}	—	October 19, 2006	Kitt Peak	Spacewatch	BRA	1.2 km	MPC; JPL
682552	2006 UT_{128}	—	October 19, 2006	Kitt Peak	Spacewatch	EOS	1.3 km	MPC; JPL
682553	2006 UH_{138}	—	October 19, 2006	Kitt Peak	Spacewatch	·	980 m	MPC; JPL
682554	2006 UY_{145}	—	October 20, 2006	Kitt Peak	Spacewatch	·	1.3 km	MPC; JPL
682555	2006 UJ_{146}	—	August 21, 2006	Kitt Peak	Spacewatch	NEM	1.8 km	MPC; JPL
682556	2006 UM_{150}	—	October 20, 2006	Mount Lemmon	Mount Lemmon Survey	EOS	1.3 km	MPC; JPL
682557	2006 UL_{161}	—	October 21, 2006	Mount Lemmon	Mount Lemmon Survey	V	540 m	MPC; JPL
682558	2006 UF_{165}	—	October 2, 2006	Mount Lemmon	Mount Lemmon Survey	·	1.5 km	MPC; JPL
682559	2006 UL_{165}	—	October 3, 2006	Mount Lemmon	Mount Lemmon Survey	·	1.4 km	MPC; JPL
682560	2006 UL_{169}	—	October 21, 2006	Mount Lemmon	Mount Lemmon Survey	·	480 m	MPC; JPL
682561	2006 UF_{171}	—	October 21, 2006	Mount Lemmon	Mount Lemmon Survey	NYS	930 m	MPC; JPL
682562	2006 UX_{172}	—	October 22, 2006	Kitt Peak	Spacewatch	AGN	990 m	MPC; JPL
682563	2006 US_{178}	—	October 16, 2006	Catalina	CSS	·	1.7 km	MPC; JPL
682564	2006 UF_{189}	—	September 28, 2006	Catalina	CSS	·	2.2 km	MPC; JPL
682565	2006 UR_{191}	—	October 11, 2006	Palomar	NEAT	·	1.9 km	MPC; JPL
682566	2006 UG_{195}	—	October 12, 2006	Kitt Peak	Spacewatch	KOR	1.1 km	MPC; JPL
682567	2006 UH_{198}	—	October 20, 2006	Kitt Peak	Spacewatch	·	1.5 km	MPC; JPL
682568	2006 UR_{209}	—	October 23, 2006	Kitt Peak	Spacewatch	·	2.0 km	MPC; JPL
682569	2006 UW_{210}	—	October 23, 2006	Kitt Peak	Spacewatch	·	2.3 km	MPC; JPL
682570	2006 UY_{213}	—	October 23, 2006	Kitt Peak	Spacewatch	·	1.5 km	MPC; JPL
682571	2006 UJ_{234}	—	October 22, 2006	Kitt Peak	Spacewatch	KOR	1.0 km	MPC; JPL
682572	2006 UX_{237}	—	October 23, 2006	Kitt Peak	Spacewatch	·	1.3 km	MPC; JPL
682573	2006 UM_{238}	—	October 23, 2006	Kitt Peak	Spacewatch	·	950 m	MPC; JPL
682574	2006 UZ_{249}	—	March 25, 2003	Mauna Kea	B. J. Gladman, J. J. Kavelaars	THM	1.6 km	MPC; JPL
682575	2006 UQ_{253}	—	October 12, 2006	Kitt Peak	Spacewatch	·	1.4 km	MPC; JPL
682576	2006 UT_{258}	—	September 25, 2006	Kitt Peak	Spacewatch	·	1.6 km	MPC; JPL
682577	2006 UU_{260}	—	October 28, 2006	Mount Lemmon	Mount Lemmon Survey	·	680 m	MPC; JPL
682578	2006 UX_{264}	—	October 27, 2006	Mount Lemmon	Mount Lemmon Survey	·	1.5 km	MPC; JPL
682579	2006 UQ_{283}	—	October 16, 2006	Kitt Peak	Spacewatch	(11882)	1.4 km	MPC; JPL
682580	2006 UB_{292}	—	October 16, 2006	Kitt Peak	Spacewatch	·	1.4 km	MPC; JPL
682581	2006 UE_{297}	—	October 19, 2006	Kitt Peak	Deep Ecliptic Survey	·	2.1 km	MPC; JPL
682582	2006 UQ_{297}	—	September 30, 2006	Mount Lemmon	Mount Lemmon Survey	NYS	1.0 km	MPC; JPL
682583	2006 UU_{302}	—	August 28, 2006	Kitt Peak	Spacewatch	·	2.6 km	MPC; JPL
682584	2006 UE_{312}	—	October 19, 2006	Kitt Peak	Deep Ecliptic Survey	·	490 m	MPC; JPL
682585	2006 UO_{316}	—	November 23, 2006	Kitt Peak	Spacewatch	·	740 m	MPC; JPL
682586	2006 UJ_{332}	—	October 21, 2006	Apache Point	SDSS Collaboration	·	1.4 km	MPC; JPL
682587	2006 UF_{344}	—	February 3, 2008	Mount Lemmon	Mount Lemmon Survey	NEM	1.9 km	MPC; JPL
682588	2006 UZ_{348}	—	October 26, 2006	Mauna Kea	P. A. Wiegert	·	1 km	MPC; JPL
682589	2006 UD_{358}	—	October 2, 2006	Mount Lemmon	Mount Lemmon Survey	·	3.0 km	MPC; JPL
682590	2006 UZ_{362}	—	October 22, 2006	Catalina	CSS	·	2.2 km	MPC; JPL
682591	2006 UV_{363}	—	October 19, 2006	Catalina	CSS	H	570 m	MPC; JPL
682592	2006 UZ_{364}	—	October 22, 2006	Mount Lemmon	Mount Lemmon Survey	·	2.8 km	MPC; JPL
682593	2006 UH_{368}	—	October 22, 2006	Mount Lemmon	Mount Lemmon Survey	·	2.4 km	MPC; JPL
682594	2006 UX_{369}	—	October 20, 2006	Kitt Peak	Spacewatch	·	1.8 km	MPC; JPL
682595	2006 UU_{372}	—	October 23, 2006	Mount Lemmon	Mount Lemmon Survey	·	2.2 km	MPC; JPL
682596	2006 UH_{375}	—	October 28, 2006	Mount Lemmon	Mount Lemmon Survey	·	1.7 km	MPC; JPL
682597	2006 UZ_{375}	—	October 28, 2006	Mount Lemmon	Mount Lemmon Survey	·	480 m	MPC; JPL
682598	2006 UG_{378}	—	May 8, 2014	Haleakala	Pan-STARRS 1	·	1.1 km	MPC; JPL
682599	2006 UN_{380}	—	October 27, 2006	Mount Lemmon	Mount Lemmon Survey	KOR	1.1 km	MPC; JPL
682600	2006 UB_{383}	—	October 21, 2006	Mount Lemmon	Mount Lemmon Survey	EOS	1.4 km	MPC; JPL

== 682601–682700 ==
back to top

Designation			Discovery			Properties		Ref
Permanent	Provisional	Named after	Date	Site	Discoverer(s)	Category	Diam.	Ref
682601	2006 UU_{385}	—	October 21, 2006	Mount Lemmon	Mount Lemmon Survey	·	1.5 km	MPC; JPL
682602	2006 UP_{386}	—	October 17, 2006	Mount Lemmon	Mount Lemmon Survey	GAL	1.6 km	MPC; JPL
682603	2006 US_{388}	—	October 31, 2006	Kitt Peak	Spacewatch	PAD	1.3 km	MPC; JPL
682604	2006 UT_{391}	—	October 22, 2006	Kitt Peak	Spacewatch	·	1.9 km	MPC; JPL
682605	2006 UY_{391}	—	October 28, 2006	Mount Lemmon	Mount Lemmon Survey	·	1.5 km	MPC; JPL
682606	2006 UU_{393}	—	October 21, 2006	Kitt Peak	Spacewatch	·	600 m	MPC; JPL
682607	2006 VN_{10}	—	October 20, 2006	Palomar	NEAT	·	620 m	MPC; JPL
682608	2006 VX_{11}	—	November 11, 2006	Mount Lemmon	Mount Lemmon Survey	·	680 m	MPC; JPL
682609	2006 VC_{59}	—	November 11, 2006	Kitt Peak	Spacewatch	EOS	1.4 km	MPC; JPL
682610	2006 VB_{127}	—	November 15, 2006	Kitt Peak	Spacewatch	TEL	1.0 km	MPC; JPL
682611	2006 VA_{133}	—	November 15, 2006	Kitt Peak	Spacewatch	·	1.1 km	MPC; JPL
682612	2006 VY_{136}	—	November 15, 2006	Kitt Peak	Spacewatch	TEL	1.1 km	MPC; JPL
682613	2006 VK_{137}	—	November 15, 2006	Kitt Peak	Spacewatch	H	360 m	MPC; JPL
682614	2006 VT_{137}	—	October 28, 2006	Mount Lemmon	Mount Lemmon Survey	·	1.6 km	MPC; JPL
682615	2006 VQ_{176}	—	November 11, 2006	Kitt Peak	Spacewatch	EUN	1.2 km	MPC; JPL
682616	2006 VF_{178}	—	October 4, 2011	Piszkés-tető	K. Sárneczky, S. Kürti	·	1.9 km	MPC; JPL
682617	2006 VO_{179}	—	October 2, 2006	Mount Lemmon	Mount Lemmon Survey	·	1.7 km	MPC; JPL
682618	2006 VE_{181}	—	November 13, 2006	Kitt Peak	Spacewatch	·	1.4 km	MPC; JPL
682619	2006 VZ_{182}	—	November 1, 2006	Kitt Peak	Spacewatch	·	1.0 km	MPC; JPL
682620	2006 VN_{187}	—	November 12, 2006	Mount Lemmon	Mount Lemmon Survey	·	1.5 km	MPC; JPL
682621 Badalamenti	2006 WD_{1}	Badalamenti	November 18, 2006	Nogales	J.-C. Merlin	·	1.5 km	MPC; JPL
682622	2006 WV_{15}	—	November 17, 2006	Kitt Peak	Spacewatch	EOS	1.3 km	MPC; JPL
682623	2006 WO_{21}	—	November 17, 2006	Mount Lemmon	Mount Lemmon Survey	·	910 m	MPC; JPL
682624	2006 WP_{21}	—	November 17, 2006	Mount Lemmon	Mount Lemmon Survey	·	830 m	MPC; JPL
682625	2006 WM_{31}	—	November 12, 2006	Mount Lemmon	Mount Lemmon Survey	·	1.4 km	MPC; JPL
682626	2006 WW_{32}	—	November 16, 2006	Kitt Peak	Spacewatch	·	1.5 km	MPC; JPL
682627	2006 WD_{40}	—	November 16, 2006	Kitt Peak	Spacewatch	·	1.8 km	MPC; JPL
682628	2006 WE_{41}	—	November 16, 2006	Kitt Peak	Spacewatch	·	550 m	MPC; JPL
682629	2006 WH_{45}	—	November 16, 2006	Mount Lemmon	Mount Lemmon Survey	H	440 m	MPC; JPL
682630	2006 WB_{48}	—	November 16, 2006	Mount Lemmon	Mount Lemmon Survey	·	790 m	MPC; JPL
682631	2006 WD_{48}	—	November 16, 2006	Kitt Peak	Spacewatch	·	1.7 km	MPC; JPL
682632	2006 WW_{51}	—	November 16, 2006	Kitt Peak	Spacewatch	·	1.6 km	MPC; JPL
682633	2006 WG_{57}	—	September 25, 2006	Kitt Peak	Spacewatch	AGN	1.0 km	MPC; JPL
682634	2006 WJ_{63}	—	November 17, 2006	Mount Lemmon	Mount Lemmon Survey	·	1.7 km	MPC; JPL
682635	2006 WG_{72}	—	November 18, 2006	Kitt Peak	Spacewatch	·	1.3 km	MPC; JPL
682636	2006 WL_{78}	—	October 19, 2006	Mount Lemmon	Mount Lemmon Survey	·	690 m	MPC; JPL
682637	2006 WN_{81}	—	November 18, 2006	Kitt Peak	Spacewatch	·	490 m	MPC; JPL
682638	2006 WP_{87}	—	November 18, 2006	Mount Lemmon	Mount Lemmon Survey	·	1.9 km	MPC; JPL
682639	2006 WK_{95}	—	November 19, 2006	Kitt Peak	Spacewatch	KOR	1.1 km	MPC; JPL
682640	2006 WO_{98}	—	October 4, 2006	Mount Lemmon	Mount Lemmon Survey	·	2.0 km	MPC; JPL
682641	2006 WF_{106}	—	October 28, 2006	Mount Lemmon	Mount Lemmon Survey	·	1.8 km	MPC; JPL
682642	2006 WB_{107}	—	November 19, 2006	Catalina	CSS	·	1.8 km	MPC; JPL
682643	2006 WS_{113}	—	October 23, 2006	Mount Lemmon	Mount Lemmon Survey	·	1.2 km	MPC; JPL
682644	2006 WN_{116}	—	November 20, 2006	Mount Lemmon	Mount Lemmon Survey	·	1.7 km	MPC; JPL
682645	2006 WS_{117}	—	December 29, 2003	Kitt Peak	Spacewatch	(883)	750 m	MPC; JPL
682646	2006 WK_{118}	—	November 20, 2006	Mount Lemmon	Mount Lemmon Survey	TEL	930 m	MPC; JPL
682647	2006 WH_{121}	—	November 21, 2006	Mount Lemmon	Mount Lemmon Survey	·	2.0 km	MPC; JPL
682648	2006 WJ_{121}	—	November 21, 2006	Mount Lemmon	Mount Lemmon Survey	·	1.6 km	MPC; JPL
682649	2006 WD_{122}	—	November 21, 2006	Mount Lemmon	Mount Lemmon Survey	·	1.7 km	MPC; JPL
682650	2006 WG_{133}	—	November 18, 2006	Kitt Peak	Spacewatch	AGN	1.1 km	MPC; JPL
682651	2006 WO_{134}	—	July 13, 2013	Haleakala	Pan-STARRS 1	·	940 m	MPC; JPL
682652	2006 WN_{147}	—	November 20, 2006	Kitt Peak	Spacewatch	·	1.7 km	MPC; JPL
682653	2006 WB_{155}	—	November 22, 2006	Kitt Peak	Spacewatch	·	450 m	MPC; JPL
682654	2006 WA_{163}	—	November 12, 2006	Mount Lemmon	Mount Lemmon Survey	EOS	1.5 km	MPC; JPL
682655	2006 WO_{165}	—	November 23, 2006	Kitt Peak	Spacewatch	KOR	1.1 km	MPC; JPL
682656	2006 WY_{166}	—	November 15, 2006	Kitt Peak	Spacewatch	·	570 m	MPC; JPL
682657	2006 WX_{171}	—	November 23, 2006	Kitt Peak	Spacewatch	AGN	950 m	MPC; JPL
682658	2006 WG_{179}	—	November 24, 2006	Mount Lemmon	Mount Lemmon Survey	RAF	830 m	MPC; JPL
682659	2006 WM_{186}	—	November 22, 2006	Socorro	LINEAR	H	520 m	MPC; JPL
682660	2006 WB_{192}	—	December 20, 2001	Apache Point	SDSS Collaboration	·	2.0 km	MPC; JPL
682661	2006 WX_{192}	—	November 27, 2006	Kitt Peak	Spacewatch	·	920 m	MPC; JPL
682662	2006 WT_{203}	—	November 23, 2006	Kitt Peak	Spacewatch	·	520 m	MPC; JPL
682663	2006 WO_{204}	—	November 14, 2006	Kitt Peak	Spacewatch	·	1.6 km	MPC; JPL
682664	2006 WL_{205}	—	November 22, 2006	Kitt Peak	Spacewatch	·	480 m	MPC; JPL
682665	2006 WB_{207}	—	February 9, 2008	Mount Lemmon	Mount Lemmon Survey	·	1.8 km	MPC; JPL
682666	2006 WL_{209}	—	November 23, 2006	Mount Lemmon	Mount Lemmon Survey	·	1.7 km	MPC; JPL
682667	2006 WM_{209}	—	November 25, 2006	Mount Lemmon	Mount Lemmon Survey	·	1.9 km	MPC; JPL
682668	2006 WO_{211}	—	May 3, 2016	Haleakala	Pan-STARRS 1	H	490 m	MPC; JPL
682669	2006 WC_{212}	—	December 17, 2001	Socorro	LINEAR	·	1.6 km	MPC; JPL
682670	2006 WM_{213}	—	April 30, 2016	Haleakala	Pan-STARRS 1	·	1.1 km	MPC; JPL
682671	2006 WQ_{213}	—	October 20, 2011	Mount Lemmon	Mount Lemmon Survey	·	1.7 km	MPC; JPL
682672	2006 WJ_{214}	—	November 17, 2006	Kitt Peak	Spacewatch	LIX	1.9 km	MPC; JPL
682673	2006 WM_{214}	—	November 23, 2006	Kitt Peak	Spacewatch	·	1.1 km	MPC; JPL
682674	2006 WE_{217}	—	April 4, 2008	Mount Lemmon	Mount Lemmon Survey	·	710 m	MPC; JPL
682675	2006 WO_{218}	—	November 22, 2006	Mount Lemmon	Mount Lemmon Survey	·	800 m	MPC; JPL
682676	2006 WQ_{218}	—	December 12, 2010	Kitt Peak	Spacewatch	·	860 m	MPC; JPL
682677	2006 WT_{218}	—	November 16, 2006	Mount Lemmon	Mount Lemmon Survey	·	2.3 km	MPC; JPL
682678	2006 WB_{220}	—	November 23, 2006	Mount Lemmon	Mount Lemmon Survey	·	800 m	MPC; JPL
682679	2006 WG_{220}	—	November 18, 2006	Kitt Peak	Spacewatch	·	1.7 km	MPC; JPL
682680	2006 WQ_{220}	—	October 2, 2015	Mount Lemmon	Mount Lemmon Survey	HOF	2.0 km	MPC; JPL
682681	2006 WD_{221}	—	November 18, 2011	Mount Lemmon	Mount Lemmon Survey	·	1.4 km	MPC; JPL
682682	2006 WX_{221}	—	November 22, 2006	Kitt Peak	Spacewatch	·	1.4 km	MPC; JPL
682683	2006 WZ_{222}	—	November 24, 2006	Kitt Peak	Spacewatch	·	950 m	MPC; JPL
682684	2006 WO_{223}	—	August 26, 2016	Haleakala	Pan-STARRS 1	EOS	1.5 km	MPC; JPL
682685	2006 WQ_{223}	—	November 16, 2006	Mount Lemmon	Mount Lemmon Survey	·	1.6 km	MPC; JPL
682686	2006 WR_{223}	—	November 25, 2006	Mount Lemmon	Mount Lemmon Survey	·	1.7 km	MPC; JPL
682687	2006 WO_{224}	—	April 5, 2014	Haleakala	Pan-STARRS 1	EOS	1.5 km	MPC; JPL
682688	2006 WF_{225}	—	January 10, 2013	Haleakala	Pan-STARRS 1	·	1.4 km	MPC; JPL
682689	2006 WN_{225}	—	August 3, 2016	Haleakala	Pan-STARRS 1	·	1.8 km	MPC; JPL
682690	2006 WE_{226}	—	November 16, 2006	Mount Lemmon	Mount Lemmon Survey	AGN	1.1 km	MPC; JPL
682691	2006 WJ_{226}	—	January 3, 2014	Mount Lemmon	Mount Lemmon Survey	·	530 m	MPC; JPL
682692	2006 WS_{226}	—	September 24, 2011	Haleakala	Pan-STARRS 1	·	1.4 km	MPC; JPL
682693	2006 WO_{227}	—	May 1, 2012	Mount Lemmon	Mount Lemmon Survey	·	750 m	MPC; JPL
682694	2006 WP_{229}	—	November 18, 2006	Kitt Peak	Spacewatch	·	870 m	MPC; JPL
682695	2006 WX_{230}	—	November 19, 2006	Catalina	CSS	·	510 m	MPC; JPL
682696	2006 WD_{231}	—	November 16, 2006	Mount Lemmon	Mount Lemmon Survey	·	510 m	MPC; JPL
682697	2006 WW_{231}	—	November 24, 2006	Mount Lemmon	Mount Lemmon Survey	3:2	3.9 km	MPC; JPL
682698	2006 WT_{235}	—	November 16, 2006	Kitt Peak	Spacewatch	EOS	1.4 km	MPC; JPL
682699	2006 WV_{235}	—	November 20, 2006	Kitt Peak	Spacewatch	·	1.8 km	MPC; JPL
682700	2006 WO_{236}	—	November 17, 2006	Mount Lemmon	Mount Lemmon Survey	·	2.0 km	MPC; JPL

== 682701–682800 ==
back to top

Designation			Discovery			Properties		Ref
Permanent	Provisional	Named after	Date	Site	Discoverer(s)	Category	Diam.	Ref
682701	2006 WS_{236}	—	November 25, 2006	Mount Lemmon	Mount Lemmon Survey	·	1.0 km	MPC; JPL
682702	2006 XT	—	December 10, 2006	Pla D'Arguines	R. Ferrando, Ferrando, M.	AEO	850 m	MPC; JPL
682703	2006 XL_{12}	—	November 24, 2006	Kitt Peak	Spacewatch	·	500 m	MPC; JPL
682704	2006 XG_{20}	—	December 11, 2006	Kitt Peak	Spacewatch	·	750 m	MPC; JPL
682705	2006 XQ_{22}	—	December 12, 2006	Kitt Peak	Spacewatch	·	540 m	MPC; JPL
682706	2006 XW_{24}	—	December 12, 2006	Mount Lemmon	Mount Lemmon Survey	THM	1.6 km	MPC; JPL
682707	2006 XW_{25}	—	November 12, 2006	Lulin	LUSS	·	1.7 km	MPC; JPL
682708	2006 XB_{29}	—	November 16, 2006	Mount Lemmon	Mount Lemmon Survey	EOS	1.3 km	MPC; JPL
682709	2006 XC_{30}	—	December 13, 2006	Mount Lemmon	Mount Lemmon Survey	·	450 m	MPC; JPL
682710	2006 XH_{37}	—	December 11, 2006	Kitt Peak	Spacewatch	·	500 m	MPC; JPL
682711	2006 XW_{53}	—	December 15, 2006	Socorro	LINEAR	·	1.2 km	MPC; JPL
682712	2006 XH_{62}	—	December 15, 2006	Kitt Peak	Spacewatch	·	2.0 km	MPC; JPL
682713	2006 XS_{67}	—	December 13, 2006	Mauna Kea	D. D. Balam, K. M. Perrett	·	2.2 km	MPC; JPL
682714	2006 XF_{68}	—	December 15, 2006	Mount Lemmon	Mount Lemmon Survey	·	1.2 km	MPC; JPL
682715	2006 XW_{74}	—	December 15, 2006	Kitt Peak	Spacewatch	·	1.2 km	MPC; JPL
682716	2006 XL_{77}	—	December 11, 2006	Kitt Peak	Spacewatch	·	1.0 km	MPC; JPL
682717	2006 XY_{77}	—	December 1, 2006	Mount Lemmon	Mount Lemmon Survey	·	930 m	MPC; JPL
682718	2006 XA_{78}	—	December 1, 2006	Mount Lemmon	Mount Lemmon Survey	·	1.9 km	MPC; JPL
682719	2006 XP_{78}	—	January 12, 2018	Mount Lemmon	Mount Lemmon Survey	·	1.5 km	MPC; JPL
682720	2006 XH_{79}	—	October 26, 2011	Haleakala	Pan-STARRS 1	·	1.2 km	MPC; JPL
682721	2006 XU_{79}	—	December 11, 2006	Kitt Peak	Spacewatch	·	1.2 km	MPC; JPL
682722	2006 XK_{80}	—	December 1, 2006	Mount Lemmon	Mount Lemmon Survey	EUN	920 m	MPC; JPL
682723	2006 XL_{80}	—	December 14, 2006	Kitt Peak	Spacewatch	THM	1.8 km	MPC; JPL
682724	2006 XP_{80}	—	December 13, 2006	Mount Lemmon	Mount Lemmon Survey	·	750 m	MPC; JPL
682725	2006 XP_{82}	—	December 13, 2006	Mount Lemmon	Mount Lemmon Survey	·	1.1 km	MPC; JPL
682726	2006 YW	—	December 16, 2006	Kitt Peak	Spacewatch	·	1.9 km	MPC; JPL
682727	2006 YH_{24}	—	December 13, 2006	Kitt Peak	Spacewatch	·	1.8 km	MPC; JPL
682728	2006 YW_{24}	—	December 21, 2006	Kitt Peak	Spacewatch	·	870 m	MPC; JPL
682729	2006 YU_{28}	—	December 21, 2006	Kitt Peak	Spacewatch	·	1.1 km	MPC; JPL
682730	2006 YH_{30}	—	December 21, 2006	Kitt Peak	Spacewatch	·	920 m	MPC; JPL
682731	2006 YE_{34}	—	December 21, 2006	Kitt Peak	Spacewatch	·	1.8 km	MPC; JPL
682732	2006 YR_{35}	—	December 21, 2006	Kitt Peak	Spacewatch	·	1.9 km	MPC; JPL
682733	2006 YX_{35}	—	December 21, 2006	Kitt Peak	Spacewatch	·	470 m	MPC; JPL
682734	2006 YG_{42}	—	December 22, 2006	Kitt Peak	Spacewatch	·	2.3 km	MPC; JPL
682735	2006 YC_{44}	—	December 25, 2006	Kitt Peak	Spacewatch	PHO	940 m	MPC; JPL
682736	2006 YP_{55}	—	December 27, 2006	Mount Lemmon	Mount Lemmon Survey	·	1.1 km	MPC; JPL
682737	2006 YO_{58}	—	July 24, 2015	Haleakala	Pan-STARRS 1	·	2.3 km	MPC; JPL
682738	2006 YD_{59}	—	November 1, 2011	Kitt Peak	Spacewatch	·	1.8 km	MPC; JPL
682739	2006 YZ_{59}	—	April 10, 2016	Haleakala	Pan-STARRS 1	H	440 m	MPC; JPL
682740	2006 YE_{60}	—	July 24, 2015	Haleakala	Pan-STARRS 1	·	1.7 km	MPC; JPL
682741	2006 YA_{61}	—	September 19, 2014	Haleakala	Pan-STARRS 1	H	380 m	MPC; JPL
682742	2006 YD_{61}	—	October 1, 2016	Mount Lemmon	Mount Lemmon Survey	·	2.1 km	MPC; JPL
682743	2006 YF_{62}	—	December 24, 2006	Kitt Peak	Spacewatch	·	1.7 km	MPC; JPL
682744	2006 YO_{62}	—	December 26, 2006	Kitt Peak	Spacewatch	AGN	990 m	MPC; JPL
682745	2006 YW_{62}	—	January 12, 2018	Kitt Peak	Spacewatch	·	1.8 km	MPC; JPL
682746	2006 YY_{62}	—	December 24, 2006	Kitt Peak	Spacewatch	H	390 m	MPC; JPL
682747	2006 YC_{63}	—	October 24, 2011	Haleakala	Pan-STARRS 1	·	1.7 km	MPC; JPL
682748	2006 YD_{63}	—	November 19, 2011	Mount Lemmon	Mount Lemmon Survey	·	1.8 km	MPC; JPL
682749	2006 YK_{63}	—	November 2, 2010	Mount Lemmon	Mount Lemmon Survey	·	1.3 km	MPC; JPL
682750	2006 YL_{63}	—	May 8, 2014	Haleakala	Pan-STARRS 1	TIR	1.8 km	MPC; JPL
682751	2006 YX_{63}	—	June 27, 2015	Haleakala	Pan-STARRS 1	·	2.4 km	MPC; JPL
682752	2006 YG_{65}	—	September 12, 2015	Haleakala	Pan-STARRS 1	KOR	1.1 km	MPC; JPL
682753	2006 YH_{66}	—	March 14, 2011	Mount Lemmon	Mount Lemmon Survey	·	590 m	MPC; JPL
682754	2006 YN_{67}	—	December 26, 2006	Kitt Peak	Spacewatch	·	840 m	MPC; JPL
682755	2006 YG_{68}	—	December 16, 2006	Mount Lemmon	Mount Lemmon Survey	EOS	1.7 km	MPC; JPL
682756	2006 YW_{68}	—	December 27, 2006	Mount Lemmon	Mount Lemmon Survey	·	1.7 km	MPC; JPL
682757	2006 YO_{69}	—	December 27, 2006	Kitt Peak	Spacewatch	·	1.9 km	MPC; JPL
682758	2006 YA_{70}	—	December 27, 2006	Mount Lemmon	Mount Lemmon Survey	·	520 m	MPC; JPL
682759	2007 AE_{8}	—	December 9, 2006	Palomar	NEAT	·	990 m	MPC; JPL
682760	2007 AM_{8}	—	January 9, 2007	Mount Lemmon	Mount Lemmon Survey	·	1.9 km	MPC; JPL
682761 Mittermaiertom	2007 AH_{11}	Mittermaiertom	January 15, 2007	Gaisberg	Gierlinger, R.	MRX	870 m	MPC; JPL
682762	2007 AW_{28}	—	January 10, 2007	Mount Lemmon	Mount Lemmon Survey	·	1.2 km	MPC; JPL
682763	2007 AM_{29}	—	January 10, 2007	Mount Lemmon	Mount Lemmon Survey	EOS	1.8 km	MPC; JPL
682764	2007 AD_{32}	—	January 10, 2007	Mount Lemmon	Mount Lemmon Survey	·	640 m	MPC; JPL
682765	2007 AG_{32}	—	January 10, 2007	Mount Lemmon	Mount Lemmon Survey	·	960 m	MPC; JPL
682766	2007 AM_{32}	—	January 15, 2007	Mauna Kea	P. A. Wiegert	·	1.9 km	MPC; JPL
682767	2007 AS_{32}	—	January 9, 2007	Mount Lemmon	Mount Lemmon Survey	·	2.1 km	MPC; JPL
682768	2007 AT_{33}	—	November 27, 2014	Haleakala	Pan-STARRS 1	·	820 m	MPC; JPL
682769	2007 AW_{33}	—	December 16, 2017	Mount Lemmon	Mount Lemmon Survey	H	400 m	MPC; JPL
682770	2007 AY_{33}	—	December 12, 2017	Haleakala	Pan-STARRS 1	·	2.1 km	MPC; JPL
682771	2007 AK_{34}	—	January 10, 2008	Kitt Peak	Spacewatch	·	1.0 km	MPC; JPL
682772	2007 AY_{35}	—	January 10, 2007	Kitt Peak	Spacewatch	·	1.0 km	MPC; JPL
682773	2007 AN_{36}	—	January 10, 2007	Kitt Peak	Spacewatch	·	790 m	MPC; JPL
682774	2007 AQ_{37}	—	January 12, 2007	Calar Alto	R. Stoss, J.-L. Ortiz	·	540 m	MPC; JPL
682775	2007 BY_{8}	—	January 17, 2007	Kitt Peak	Spacewatch	·	2.4 km	MPC; JPL
682776	2007 BC_{13}	—	January 17, 2007	Kitt Peak	Spacewatch	3:2	3.5 km	MPC; JPL
682777	2007 BG_{24}	—	January 17, 2007	Kitt Peak	Spacewatch	·	880 m	MPC; JPL
682778	2007 BP_{24}	—	November 17, 2006	Mount Lemmon	Mount Lemmon Survey	·	640 m	MPC; JPL
682779	2007 BT_{24}	—	January 24, 2007	Mount Lemmon	Mount Lemmon Survey	EOS	1.7 km	MPC; JPL
682780	2007 BB_{28}	—	January 17, 2007	Kitt Peak	Spacewatch	·	2.1 km	MPC; JPL
682781	2007 BZ_{28}	—	January 24, 2007	Mount Nyukasa	Japan Aerospace Exploration Agency	·	520 m	MPC; JPL
682782	2007 BG_{33}	—	January 9, 2007	Kitt Peak	Spacewatch	·	610 m	MPC; JPL
682783	2007 BK_{33}	—	December 24, 2006	Kitt Peak	Spacewatch	3:2	3.5 km	MPC; JPL
682784	2007 BK_{46}	—	January 26, 2007	Kitt Peak	Spacewatch	(5)	920 m	MPC; JPL
682785	2007 BD_{53}	—	March 23, 2003	Apache Point	SDSS Collaboration	·	1.8 km	MPC; JPL
682786	2007 BU_{54}	—	January 10, 2007	Kitt Peak	Spacewatch	·	950 m	MPC; JPL
682787	2007 BW_{54}	—	January 24, 2007	Mount Lemmon	Mount Lemmon Survey	·	2.0 km	MPC; JPL
682788	2007 BA_{60}	—	January 26, 2007	Kitt Peak	Spacewatch	·	1.8 km	MPC; JPL
682789	2007 BS_{62}	—	January 27, 2007	Mount Lemmon	Mount Lemmon Survey	·	2.3 km	MPC; JPL
682790	2007 BJ_{64}	—	November 27, 2006	Mount Lemmon	Mount Lemmon Survey	·	2.4 km	MPC; JPL
682791	2007 BR_{66}	—	January 27, 2007	Mount Lemmon	Mount Lemmon Survey	·	1.7 km	MPC; JPL
682792	2007 BB_{68}	—	October 29, 2005	Mount Lemmon	Mount Lemmon Survey	·	2.1 km	MPC; JPL
682793	2007 BQ_{68}	—	January 27, 2007	Mount Lemmon	Mount Lemmon Survey	·	2.0 km	MPC; JPL
682794	2007 BZ_{71}	—	January 28, 2007	Kitt Peak	Spacewatch	(5931)	2.5 km	MPC; JPL
682795	2007 BO_{80}	—	January 17, 2007	Kitt Peak	Spacewatch	H	470 m	MPC; JPL
682796	2007 BD_{84}	—	January 19, 2007	Mauna Kea	P. A. Wiegert	·	1.7 km	MPC; JPL
682797	2007 BG_{92}	—	January 19, 2007	Mauna Kea	P. A. Wiegert	·	580 m	MPC; JPL
682798	2007 BU_{96}	—	January 19, 2007	Mauna Kea	P. A. Wiegert	·	990 m	MPC; JPL
682799	2007 BV_{97}	—	January 27, 2007	Kitt Peak	Spacewatch	·	1.6 km	MPC; JPL
682800	2007 BH_{101}	—	January 27, 2007	Kitt Peak	Spacewatch	·	2.3 km	MPC; JPL

== 682801–682900 ==
back to top

Designation			Discovery			Properties		Ref
Permanent	Provisional	Named after	Date	Site	Discoverer(s)	Category	Diam.	Ref
682801	2007 BM_{103}	—	January 27, 2007	Kitt Peak	Spacewatch	·	2.4 km	MPC; JPL
682802	2007 BT_{104}	—	January 28, 2007	Mount Lemmon	Mount Lemmon Survey	·	1.5 km	MPC; JPL
682803	2007 BC_{105}	—	July 25, 2015	Haleakala	Pan-STARRS 1	·	2.2 km	MPC; JPL
682804	2007 BE_{105}	—	April 1, 2008	Mount Lemmon	Mount Lemmon Survey	·	1.5 km	MPC; JPL
682805	2007 BZ_{105}	—	January 29, 2007	Kitt Peak	Spacewatch	·	2.6 km	MPC; JPL
682806	2007 BA_{106}	—	November 20, 2009	Mount Lemmon	Mount Lemmon Survey	·	540 m	MPC; JPL
682807	2007 BB_{106}	—	January 28, 2007	Mount Lemmon	Mount Lemmon Survey	·	2.7 km	MPC; JPL
682808	2007 BY_{106}	—	January 17, 2007	Kitt Peak	Spacewatch	·	2.1 km	MPC; JPL
682809	2007 BJ_{107}	—	October 6, 2016	Mount Lemmon	Mount Lemmon Survey	·	2.5 km	MPC; JPL
682810	2007 BQ_{108}	—	October 21, 2012	Mount Lemmon	Mount Lemmon Survey	·	520 m	MPC; JPL
682811	2007 BX_{109}	—	June 27, 2014	Haleakala	Pan-STARRS 1	·	2.3 km	MPC; JPL
682812	2007 BZ_{109}	—	January 17, 2007	Kitt Peak	Spacewatch	·	520 m	MPC; JPL
682813	2007 BD_{110}	—	January 17, 2007	Kitt Peak	Spacewatch	HYG	1.7 km	MPC; JPL
682814	2007 BP_{110}	—	January 28, 2007	Catalina	CSS	·	1.7 km	MPC; JPL
682815	2007 BT_{110}	—	January 28, 2007	Mount Lemmon	Mount Lemmon Survey	·	2.0 km	MPC; JPL
682816	2007 BE_{111}	—	March 14, 2013	Kitt Peak	Spacewatch	·	2.1 km	MPC; JPL
682817	2007 BA_{112}	—	February 17, 2013	Mount Lemmon	Mount Lemmon Survey	·	2.1 km	MPC; JPL
682818	2007 BH_{113}	—	October 17, 2010	Mount Lemmon	Mount Lemmon Survey	·	1.4 km	MPC; JPL
682819	2007 BC_{114}	—	January 28, 2007	Mount Lemmon	Mount Lemmon Survey	·	2.5 km	MPC; JPL
682820	2007 BQ_{115}	—	January 13, 2015	Haleakala	Pan-STARRS 1	·	750 m	MPC; JPL
682821	2007 BL_{116}	—	January 28, 2007	Mount Lemmon	Mount Lemmon Survey	MAS	590 m	MPC; JPL
682822	2007 BV_{119}	—	January 25, 2007	Kitt Peak	Spacewatch	·	2.1 km	MPC; JPL
682823	2007 BF_{120}	—	January 25, 2007	Kitt Peak	Spacewatch	THM	1.9 km	MPC; JPL
682824	2007 BK_{120}	—	January 29, 2007	Kitt Peak	Spacewatch	·	2.1 km	MPC; JPL
682825	2007 BS_{120}	—	January 24, 2007	Mount Lemmon	Mount Lemmon Survey	·	570 m	MPC; JPL
682826	2007 BQ_{121}	—	January 28, 2007	Mount Lemmon	Mount Lemmon Survey	·	1.9 km	MPC; JPL
682827	2007 BA_{122}	—	January 17, 2007	Kitt Peak	Spacewatch	·	860 m	MPC; JPL
682828	2007 CJ_{4}	—	February 6, 2007	Mount Lemmon	Mount Lemmon Survey	·	500 m	MPC; JPL
682829	2007 CO_{18}	—	February 8, 2007	Mount Lemmon	Mount Lemmon Survey	·	2.0 km	MPC; JPL
682830	2007 CO_{28}	—	February 6, 2007	Kitt Peak	Spacewatch	·	2.5 km	MPC; JPL
682831	2007 CS_{31}	—	January 27, 2007	Mount Lemmon	Mount Lemmon Survey	·	930 m	MPC; JPL
682832	2007 CM_{32}	—	January 27, 2007	Mount Lemmon	Mount Lemmon Survey	·	820 m	MPC; JPL
682833	2007 CR_{39}	—	January 10, 2007	Mount Lemmon	Mount Lemmon Survey	·	440 m	MPC; JPL
682834	2007 CA_{40}	—	February 6, 2007	Mount Lemmon	Mount Lemmon Survey	·	2.4 km	MPC; JPL
682835	2007 CP_{49}	—	February 10, 2007	Mount Lemmon	Mount Lemmon Survey	EMA	2.4 km	MPC; JPL
682836	2007 CE_{56}	—	February 17, 2007	Mount Lemmon	Mount Lemmon Survey	·	2.3 km	MPC; JPL
682837	2007 CQ_{63}	—	February 6, 2007	Kitt Peak	Spacewatch	H	690 m	MPC; JPL
682838	2007 CM_{66}	—	September 19, 2001	Socorro	LINEAR	MAS	690 m	MPC; JPL
682839	2007 CG_{72}	—	February 14, 2007	Mauna Kea	P. A. Wiegert	·	1.8 km	MPC; JPL
682840	2007 CY_{75}	—	February 13, 2007	Mount Lemmon	Mount Lemmon Survey	·	1.8 km	MPC; JPL
682841	2007 CQ_{78}	—	November 7, 2002	Kitt Peak	Deep Ecliptic Survey	·	840 m	MPC; JPL
682842	2007 CE_{79}	—	February 8, 2007	Mount Lemmon	Mount Lemmon Survey	AGN	1.0 km	MPC; JPL
682843	2007 CM_{80}	—	February 8, 2007	Mount Lemmon	Mount Lemmon Survey	H	480 m	MPC; JPL
682844	2007 CP_{80}	—	February 10, 2007	Catalina	CSS	·	870 m	MPC; JPL
682845	2007 CA_{81}	—	January 28, 2007	Kitt Peak	Spacewatch	·	1.7 km	MPC; JPL
682846	2007 CM_{83}	—	July 26, 2015	Haleakala	Pan-STARRS 1	EOS	1.4 km	MPC; JPL
682847	2007 CU_{84}	—	February 10, 2007	Mount Lemmon	Mount Lemmon Survey	HNS	790 m	MPC; JPL
682848	2007 CD_{86}	—	February 10, 2007	Mount Lemmon	Mount Lemmon Survey	·	1.9 km	MPC; JPL
682849	2007 CH_{86}	—	February 10, 2007	Mount Lemmon	Mount Lemmon Survey	·	2.0 km	MPC; JPL
682850	2007 DU_{9}	—	February 17, 2007	Kitt Peak	Spacewatch	·	1.2 km	MPC; JPL
682851	2007 DK_{21}	—	February 17, 2007	Kitt Peak	Spacewatch	·	790 m	MPC; JPL
682852	2007 DA_{24}	—	February 17, 2007	Kitt Peak	Spacewatch	·	1.2 km	MPC; JPL
682853	2007 DR_{27}	—	February 17, 2007	Kitt Peak	Spacewatch	·	540 m	MPC; JPL
682854	2007 DK_{29}	—	February 17, 2007	Kitt Peak	Spacewatch	·	2.4 km	MPC; JPL
682855	2007 DU_{31}	—	February 17, 2007	Kitt Peak	Spacewatch	(5)	870 m	MPC; JPL
682856	2007 DM_{42}	—	January 24, 2007	Mount Lemmon	Mount Lemmon Survey	·	780 m	MPC; JPL
682857	2007 DV_{51}	—	February 17, 2007	Mount Lemmon	Mount Lemmon Survey	EUN	1.2 km	MPC; JPL
682858	2007 DO_{54}	—	February 21, 2007	Kitt Peak	Spacewatch	·	850 m	MPC; JPL
682859	2007 DO_{59}	—	February 22, 2007	Kitt Peak	Spacewatch	·	1.1 km	MPC; JPL
682860	2007 DR_{63}	—	February 21, 2007	Kitt Peak	Spacewatch	·	1.9 km	MPC; JPL
682861	2007 DE_{64}	—	November 4, 2005	Mount Lemmon	Mount Lemmon Survey	·	2.4 km	MPC; JPL
682862	2007 DQ_{69}	—	February 21, 2007	Kitt Peak	Spacewatch	·	2.3 km	MPC; JPL
682863	2007 DM_{71}	—	February 9, 2007	Kitt Peak	Spacewatch	·	1.8 km	MPC; JPL
682864	2007 DO_{72}	—	February 21, 2007	Kitt Peak	Spacewatch	EOS	1.4 km	MPC; JPL
682865	2007 DZ_{73}	—	February 8, 2002	Kitt Peak	Spacewatch	·	1.4 km	MPC; JPL
682866	2007 DN_{78}	—	February 23, 2007	Kitt Peak	Spacewatch	·	1.3 km	MPC; JPL
682867	2007 DA_{79}	—	February 23, 2007	Kitt Peak	Spacewatch	·	2.1 km	MPC; JPL
682868	2007 DG_{80}	—	February 23, 2007	Mount Lemmon	Mount Lemmon Survey	·	440 m	MPC; JPL
682869	2007 DY_{84}	—	February 21, 2007	Charleston	R. Holmes	·	1.7 km	MPC; JPL
682870	2007 DX_{116}	—	February 25, 2007	Catalina	CSS	·	2.0 km	MPC; JPL
682871	2007 DH_{118}	—	February 10, 2007	Mount Lemmon	Mount Lemmon Survey	EOS	1.5 km	MPC; JPL
682872	2007 DE_{120}	—	March 20, 2015	Haleakala	Pan-STARRS 1	·	1.5 km	MPC; JPL
682873	2007 DQ_{120}	—	April 10, 2013	Mount Lemmon	Mount Lemmon Survey	EUP	2.6 km	MPC; JPL
682874	2007 DV_{120}	—	May 7, 2016	Haleakala	Pan-STARRS 1	·	980 m	MPC; JPL
682875	2007 DY_{120}	—	January 26, 2012	Haleakala	Pan-STARRS 1	·	2.6 km	MPC; JPL
682876	2007 DJ_{121}	—	September 1, 2010	Mount Lemmon	Mount Lemmon Survey	·	2.1 km	MPC; JPL
682877	2007 DO_{121}	—	June 5, 2014	Haleakala	Pan-STARRS 1	·	2.0 km	MPC; JPL
682878	2007 DS_{122}	—	August 4, 2008	Siding Spring	SSS	·	760 m	MPC; JPL
682879	2007 DF_{123}	—	April 15, 2013	Haleakala	Pan-STARRS 1	·	1.8 km	MPC; JPL
682880	2007 DH_{123}	—	April 15, 2008	Mount Lemmon	Mount Lemmon Survey	EOS	1.9 km	MPC; JPL
682881	2007 DU_{123}	—	January 12, 2018	Haleakala	Pan-STARRS 1	LIX	2.7 km	MPC; JPL
682882	2007 DJ_{125}	—	October 12, 2016	Haleakala	Pan-STARRS 1	·	2.2 km	MPC; JPL
682883	2007 DQ_{125}	—	December 23, 2017	Haleakala	Pan-STARRS 1	·	2.1 km	MPC; JPL
682884	2007 DG_{126}	—	February 25, 2007	Kitt Peak	Spacewatch	·	490 m	MPC; JPL
682885	2007 DO_{127}	—	February 17, 2007	Mount Lemmon	Mount Lemmon Survey	HYG	1.9 km	MPC; JPL
682886	2007 DT_{127}	—	February 17, 2007	Kitt Peak	Spacewatch	·	830 m	MPC; JPL
682887	2007 DM_{128}	—	February 16, 2007	Mount Lemmon	Mount Lemmon Survey	·	1.1 km	MPC; JPL
682888	2007 DO_{128}	—	February 22, 2007	Siding Spring	SSS	TIR	3.0 km	MPC; JPL
682889	2007 DB_{129}	—	February 21, 2007	Mount Lemmon	Mount Lemmon Survey	·	2.1 km	MPC; JPL
682890	2007 DR_{129}	—	February 25, 2007	Mount Lemmon	Mount Lemmon Survey	·	2.6 km	MPC; JPL
682891	2007 DG_{131}	—	February 21, 2007	Kitt Peak	Spacewatch	·	590 m	MPC; JPL
682892	2007 DP_{131}	—	February 25, 2007	Kitt Peak	Spacewatch	·	2.2 km	MPC; JPL
682893	2007 DN_{132}	—	February 22, 2007	Kitt Peak	Spacewatch	·	1.8 km	MPC; JPL
682894	2007 DB_{133}	—	February 26, 2007	Mount Lemmon	Mount Lemmon Survey	THM	1.9 km	MPC; JPL
682895	2007 DY_{133}	—	February 21, 2007	Kitt Peak	Spacewatch	·	2.1 km	MPC; JPL
682896	2007 DZ_{133}	—	February 17, 2007	Mount Lemmon	Mount Lemmon Survey	KON	1.6 km	MPC; JPL
682897	2007 EW_{2}	—	February 25, 2007	Kitt Peak	Spacewatch	·	2.2 km	MPC; JPL
682898	2007 ES_{5}	—	February 23, 2007	Mount Lemmon	Mount Lemmon Survey	THM	1.7 km	MPC; JPL
682899	2007 ET_{6}	—	March 9, 2007	Mount Lemmon	Mount Lemmon Survey	·	420 m	MPC; JPL
682900	2007 EB_{40}	—	March 11, 2007	Kitt Peak	Spacewatch	·	1.5 km	MPC; JPL

== 682901–683000 ==
back to top

Designation			Discovery			Properties		Ref
Permanent	Provisional	Named after	Date	Site	Discoverer(s)	Category	Diam.	Ref
682901	2007 EY_{40}	—	February 25, 2007	Mount Lemmon	Mount Lemmon Survey	·	2.1 km	MPC; JPL
682902	2007 EQ_{50}	—	March 10, 2007	Mount Lemmon	Mount Lemmon Survey	·	1.2 km	MPC; JPL
682903	2007 EW_{54}	—	February 21, 2007	Mount Lemmon	Mount Lemmon Survey	EUN	940 m	MPC; JPL
682904	2007 EG_{59}	—	February 23, 2007	Mount Lemmon	Mount Lemmon Survey	·	950 m	MPC; JPL
682905	2007 EK_{62}	—	March 10, 2007	Kitt Peak	Spacewatch	615	1.3 km	MPC; JPL
682906	2007 EH_{65}	—	March 10, 2007	Kitt Peak	Spacewatch	·	960 m	MPC; JPL
682907	2007 EF_{66}	—	March 10, 2007	Kitt Peak	Spacewatch	·	920 m	MPC; JPL
682908	2007 EL_{81}	—	March 11, 2007	Kitt Peak	Spacewatch	·	1.2 km	MPC; JPL
682909	2007 EP_{90}	—	March 9, 2007	Mount Lemmon	Mount Lemmon Survey	KOR	1.3 km	MPC; JPL
682910	2007 EK_{91}	—	May 5, 2003	Kitt Peak	Spacewatch	·	1.9 km	MPC; JPL
682911	2007 EF_{94}	—	November 25, 2005	Kitt Peak	Spacewatch	KOR	1.4 km	MPC; JPL
682912	2007 EX_{106}	—	March 11, 2007	Kitt Peak	Spacewatch	·	930 m	MPC; JPL
682913	2007 EE_{109}	—	March 11, 2007	Kitt Peak	Spacewatch	·	2.2 km	MPC; JPL
682914	2007 EC_{121}	—	February 23, 2007	Mount Lemmon	Mount Lemmon Survey	·	570 m	MPC; JPL
682915	2007 EP_{123}	—	March 14, 2007	Mount Lemmon	Mount Lemmon Survey	EOS	1.4 km	MPC; JPL
682916	2007 EE_{129}	—	March 9, 2007	Kitt Peak	Spacewatch	·	430 m	MPC; JPL
682917	2007 EH_{129}	—	February 23, 2007	Mount Lemmon	Mount Lemmon Survey	·	1.8 km	MPC; JPL
682918	2007 EX_{141}	—	March 12, 2007	Kitt Peak	Spacewatch	·	2.5 km	MPC; JPL
682919	2007 EM_{143}	—	March 12, 2007	Kitt Peak	Spacewatch	·	1.6 km	MPC; JPL
682920	2007 ES_{146}	—	March 12, 2007	Mount Lemmon	Mount Lemmon Survey	KOR	1.2 km	MPC; JPL
682921	2007 EU_{146}	—	March 12, 2007	Mount Lemmon	Mount Lemmon Survey	KOR	1.2 km	MPC; JPL
682922	2007 EG_{149}	—	March 12, 2007	Mount Lemmon	Mount Lemmon Survey	·	810 m	MPC; JPL
682923	2007 EB_{151}	—	March 12, 2007	Mount Lemmon	Mount Lemmon Survey	KOR	1.1 km	MPC; JPL
682924	2007 EH_{151}	—	February 26, 2007	Mount Lemmon	Mount Lemmon Survey	V	430 m	MPC; JPL
682925	2007 EK_{151}	—	March 12, 2007	Mount Lemmon	Mount Lemmon Survey	·	770 m	MPC; JPL
682926	2007 EC_{155}	—	March 12, 2007	Kitt Peak	Spacewatch	·	2.4 km	MPC; JPL
682927	2007 EO_{159}	—	April 13, 2002	Kitt Peak	Spacewatch	VER	1.8 km	MPC; JPL
682928	2007 ES_{159}	—	March 14, 2007	Mount Lemmon	Mount Lemmon Survey	·	1.2 km	MPC; JPL
682929	2007 EO_{170}	—	January 27, 2007	Mount Lemmon	Mount Lemmon Survey	·	600 m	MPC; JPL
682930	2007 EK_{174}	—	March 14, 2007	Kitt Peak	Spacewatch	BRA	1.4 km	MPC; JPL
682931	2007 EL_{174}	—	March 14, 2007	Kitt Peak	Spacewatch	TIR	2.0 km	MPC; JPL
682932	2007 EJ_{177}	—	March 14, 2007	Kitt Peak	Spacewatch	·	1.1 km	MPC; JPL
682933	2007 EO_{179}	—	March 14, 2007	Mount Lemmon	Mount Lemmon Survey	·	470 m	MPC; JPL
682934	2007 EK_{186}	—	March 15, 2007	Mount Lemmon	Mount Lemmon Survey	·	2.4 km	MPC; JPL
682935	2007 EZ_{189}	—	November 12, 2001	Apache Point	SDSS Collaboration	·	920 m	MPC; JPL
682936	2007 EV_{191}	—	March 13, 2007	Kitt Peak	Spacewatch	·	530 m	MPC; JPL
682937	2007 EW_{208}	—	March 14, 2007	Mount Lemmon	Mount Lemmon Survey	·	1.1 km	MPC; JPL
682938	2007 EZ_{212}	—	March 11, 2007	Kitt Peak	Spacewatch	LIX	2.7 km	MPC; JPL
682939	2007 EF_{220}	—	March 13, 2007	Mount Lemmon	Mount Lemmon Survey	·	1.8 km	MPC; JPL
682940	2007 EH_{226}	—	March 10, 2007	Mount Lemmon	Mount Lemmon Survey	·	950 m	MPC; JPL
682941	2007 EO_{226}	—	March 10, 2007	Kitt Peak	Spacewatch	·	540 m	MPC; JPL
682942	2007 EQ_{227}	—	March 14, 2007	Kitt Peak	Spacewatch	KOR	1.2 km	MPC; JPL
682943	2007 EZ_{227}	—	June 1, 2012	Mount Lemmon	Mount Lemmon Survey	·	1.3 km	MPC; JPL
682944	2007 EA_{229}	—	March 9, 2007	Kitt Peak	Spacewatch	·	2.2 km	MPC; JPL
682945	2007 EZ_{229}	—	January 14, 2012	Kitt Peak	Spacewatch	·	1.8 km	MPC; JPL
682946	2007 EA_{230}	—	March 11, 2015	Mount Lemmon	Mount Lemmon Survey	·	1.0 km	MPC; JPL
682947	2007 EN_{230}	—	March 14, 2007	Mount Lemmon	Mount Lemmon Survey	·	2.6 km	MPC; JPL
682948	2007 EE_{232}	—	March 12, 2013	Mount Lemmon	Mount Lemmon Survey	·	1.8 km	MPC; JPL
682949	2007 EC_{233}	—	March 19, 2013	Haleakala	Pan-STARRS 1	·	2.6 km	MPC; JPL
682950	2007 ET_{233}	—	March 14, 2007	Mount Lemmon	Mount Lemmon Survey	·	2.2 km	MPC; JPL
682951	2007 EV_{233}	—	May 11, 2008	Mount Lemmon	Mount Lemmon Survey	L5	7.0 km	MPC; JPL
682952	2007 EC_{234}	—	February 23, 2012	Mount Lemmon	Mount Lemmon Survey	EOS	1.3 km	MPC; JPL
682953	2007 EH_{234}	—	March 10, 2007	Mount Lemmon	Mount Lemmon Survey	URS	2.4 km	MPC; JPL
682954	2007 EA_{237}	—	March 9, 2007	Mount Lemmon	Mount Lemmon Survey	·	470 m	MPC; JPL
682955	2007 EZ_{237}	—	March 9, 2007	Mount Lemmon	Mount Lemmon Survey	THM	1.8 km	MPC; JPL
682956	2007 EF_{238}	—	March 11, 2007	Mount Lemmon	Mount Lemmon Survey	·	810 m	MPC; JPL
682957	2007 EM_{238}	—	March 10, 2007	Kitt Peak	Spacewatch	·	560 m	MPC; JPL
682958	2007 EL_{239}	—	March 13, 2007	Mount Lemmon	Mount Lemmon Survey	(5)	950 m	MPC; JPL
682959	2007 ES_{239}	—	March 10, 2007	Mount Lemmon	Mount Lemmon Survey	MIS	2.1 km	MPC; JPL
682960	2007 EW_{239}	—	March 9, 2007	Kitt Peak	Spacewatch	·	950 m	MPC; JPL
682961	2007 EX_{239}	—	March 9, 2007	Kitt Peak	Spacewatch	·	1.0 km	MPC; JPL
682962	2007 ED_{240}	—	March 10, 2007	Kitt Peak	Spacewatch	THM	1.7 km	MPC; JPL
682963	2007 ED_{243}	—	March 10, 2007	Kitt Peak	Spacewatch	·	2.2 km	MPC; JPL
682964	2007 EJ_{243}	—	March 13, 2007	Kitt Peak	Spacewatch	·	980 m	MPC; JPL
682965	2007 EK_{243}	—	March 14, 2007	Kitt Peak	Spacewatch	LUT	2.9 km	MPC; JPL
682966	2007 EO_{244}	—	March 13, 2007	Kitt Peak	Spacewatch	·	990 m	MPC; JPL
682967	2007 FT	—	March 16, 2007	Mount Lemmon	Mount Lemmon Survey	·	2.3 km	MPC; JPL
682968	2007 FL_{4}	—	October 25, 2005	Mount Lemmon	Mount Lemmon Survey	·	1.2 km	MPC; JPL
682969	2007 FW_{9}	—	March 16, 2007	Kitt Peak	Spacewatch	T_{j} (2.98)	2.6 km	MPC; JPL
682970	2007 FA_{14}	—	March 19, 2007	Mount Lemmon	Mount Lemmon Survey	·	1.0 km	MPC; JPL
682971	2007 FD_{19}	—	March 9, 2007	Kitt Peak	Spacewatch	·	2.2 km	MPC; JPL
682972	2007 FN_{21}	—	October 30, 2005	Kitt Peak	Spacewatch	THM	1.8 km	MPC; JPL
682973	2007 FV_{28}	—	March 20, 2007	Mount Lemmon	Mount Lemmon Survey	·	2.3 km	MPC; JPL
682974	2007 FD_{29}	—	March 20, 2007	Mount Lemmon	Mount Lemmon Survey	·	2.2 km	MPC; JPL
682975	2007 FX_{37}	—	March 28, 2007	Mount Lemmon	Mount Lemmon Survey	·	440 m	MPC; JPL
682976	2007 FD_{49}	—	March 29, 2007	Kitt Peak	Spacewatch	3:2	5.9 km	MPC; JPL
682977	2007 FS_{50}	—	September 15, 2013	Mount Lemmon	Mount Lemmon Survey	·	830 m	MPC; JPL
682978	2007 FV_{51}	—	March 16, 2007	Mount Lemmon	Mount Lemmon Survey	THM	1.5 km	MPC; JPL
682979	2007 FW_{51}	—	March 25, 2007	Mount Lemmon	Mount Lemmon Survey	·	2.6 km	MPC; JPL
682980	2007 FE_{52}	—	September 19, 2009	Kitt Peak	Spacewatch	THM	2.0 km	MPC; JPL
682981	2007 FD_{53}	—	March 26, 2007	Mount Lemmon	Mount Lemmon Survey	EUN	920 m	MPC; JPL
682982	2007 FB_{54}	—	March 26, 2007	Kitt Peak	Spacewatch	·	2.4 km	MPC; JPL
682983	2007 FF_{54}	—	December 9, 2014	Haleakala	Pan-STARRS 1	H	530 m	MPC; JPL
682984	2007 FC_{55}	—	January 16, 2018	Haleakala	Pan-STARRS 1	·	2.4 km	MPC; JPL
682985	2007 FK_{55}	—	March 26, 2007	Mount Lemmon	Mount Lemmon Survey	·	2.6 km	MPC; JPL
682986	2007 FO_{55}	—	October 22, 2013	Mount Lemmon	Mount Lemmon Survey	·	970 m	MPC; JPL
682987	2007 FA_{57}	—	December 22, 2016	Haleakala	Pan-STARRS 1	·	2.0 km	MPC; JPL
682988	2007 FM_{57}	—	June 23, 2015	Haleakala	Pan-STARRS 2	·	750 m	MPC; JPL
682989	2007 FZ_{57}	—	January 2, 2012	Kitt Peak	Spacewatch	EOS	1.6 km	MPC; JPL
682990	2007 FC_{58}	—	February 22, 2018	Mount Lemmon	Mount Lemmon Survey	VER	2.4 km	MPC; JPL
682991	2007 FH_{58}	—	November 18, 2016	Mount Lemmon	Mount Lemmon Survey	TIR	2.1 km	MPC; JPL
682992	2007 FP_{59}	—	March 16, 2007	Mount Lemmon	Mount Lemmon Survey	·	2.2 km	MPC; JPL
682993	2007 FU_{59}	—	March 16, 2007	Mount Lemmon	Mount Lemmon Survey	·	2.1 km	MPC; JPL
682994	2007 FC_{60}	—	March 16, 2007	Kitt Peak	Spacewatch	·	1.3 km	MPC; JPL
682995	2007 FJ_{60}	—	March 26, 2007	Mount Lemmon	Mount Lemmon Survey	·	1.1 km	MPC; JPL
682996	2007 FE_{62}	—	March 16, 2007	Kitt Peak	Spacewatch	AGN	1.1 km	MPC; JPL
682997	2007 FX_{63}	—	March 25, 2007	Mount Lemmon	Mount Lemmon Survey	·	2.7 km	MPC; JPL
682998	2007 FG_{64}	—	March 16, 2007	Kitt Peak	Spacewatch	·	2.2 km	MPC; JPL
682999	2007 FM_{64}	—	March 16, 2007	Mount Lemmon	Mount Lemmon Survey	·	2.5 km	MPC; JPL
683000	2007 GE_{3}	—	March 16, 2007	Mount Lemmon	Mount Lemmon Survey	·	1.0 km	MPC; JPL

back to top

== Meaning of names ==
As minor planet discoveries are confirmed, they are given a permanent number by the IAU's Minor Planet Center (MPC), and the discoverers can then submit names for them, following the IAU's naming conventions. The list below concerns those minor planets in the specified number-range that have received names, and explains the meanings of those names.

Official naming citations of newly named small Solar System bodies are approved and published in a bulletin by IAU's Working Group for Small Bodies Nomenclature (WGSBN). Before May 2021, citations were published in MPC's Minor Planet Circulars for many decades. Recent citations can also be found on the JPL Small-Body Database (SBDB). Until his death in 2016, German astronomer Lutz D. Schmadel compiled these citations into the Dictionary of Minor Planet Names (DMP) and regularly updated the collection.

Based on Paul Herget's The Names of the Minor Planets, Schmadel also researched the unclear origin of numerous asteroids, most of which had been named prior to World War II. This article incorporates text from this source, which is in the public domain: SBDB New namings may only be added to this list below after official publication as the preannouncement of names is condemned. The WGSBN publishes a comprehensive guideline for the naming rules of non-cometary small Solar System bodies.

Named minor planet	Provisional	This minor planet was named for...	Ref; Catalog
682621 Badalamenti	2006 WD_{1}	Angelo Daniel Badalamenti, American composer and arranger best known for his film music, notably the scores for his collaborations with director David Lynch, including Blue Velvet, Twin Peaks and Mulholland Drive.	IAU · 682621
682761 Mittermaiertom	2007 AH_{11}	Thomas Mittermaier (1967–2023), a German farmer and entrepreneur.	IAU · 682761
