= Steve Brewer =

American fiction author (born 1957)

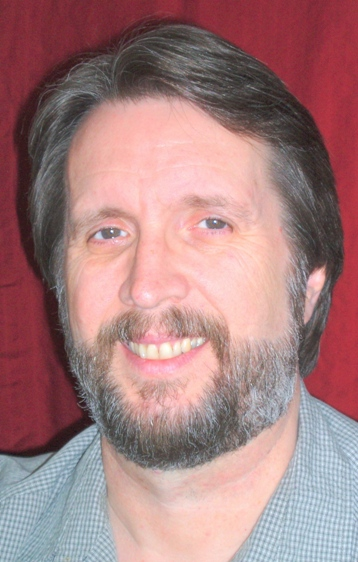
- Born: February 2, 1957 (age 69); Bremerton, Washington, U.S.
- Education: University of Arkansas at Little Rock (BA)
- Occupations: Author; humorist; lecturer; bookseller
- Writing career
- Pen name: Max Austin
- Language: English
- Genres: Mystery fiction; Mystery; crime; thriller; humor
- Website: stevebrewer.blogspot.com

Steve Brewer (born February 2, 1957) is an American author of mystery, detective and crime novels. His novel Lonely Street was made into the Hollywood film of the same name, starring Robert Patrick, Jay Mohr and Joe Mantegna.

== Biography ==
=== Writing ===
Brewer was a journalist for 22 years, writing for the Arkansas Gazette, Associated Press, and Albuquerque Journal. He continued to write a weekly syndicated humor column for 10 more years, many of them collected in the book Trophy Husband.

Brewer switched to fiction with the publication of his first novel, Lonely Street in 1994. He has published 34 books, including three under the pen name Max Austin. Ten of his novels, including Lonely Street, feature bumbling Albuquerque private eye Bubba Mabry.

=== Teaching ===
Brewer teaches writing at the Honors College of the University of New Mexico.

He has also taught classes at the Midwest Writers Workshop, SouthWest Writers, and the Tony Hillerman Writers Seminar, and regularly speaks at mystery conventions.

=== Bookstore ===
In 2018, Brewer opened Organic Books, an independent bookstore in Albuquerque, NM, with his wife Kelly and sons Max and Seth.

== Published works ==
=== Novels ===
- Lonely Street (1994), Pocket Books
- Baby Face (1995), Pocket Books
- Witchy Woman (1996), St. Martin's Press
- Shaky Ground (1997), St. Martin's Press
- Dirty Pool (1999), St. Martin's Press
- End Run (2000), Intrigue Press
- Crazy Love (2001), Intrigue Press
- Cheap Shot (2002), Intrigue Press
- Bullets (2003), Intrigue Press
- Fool's Paradise (2003), UNM Press
- Boost (2004), Speck Press
- Bank Job (2005), Intrigue Press
- Whipsaw (2006), Intrigue Press
- Monkey Man (2006), Intrigue Press
- Cutthroat (2007), Bleak House
- Firepower (2010), Amazon
- 1500 Rules for Successful Living (2011), Amazon
- Calabama (2011), Amazon
- The Big Wink (2011), Amazon
- Lost Vegas (2011), Amazon
- A Box of Pandoras (2012), Amazon
- Duke City Split (as Max Austin) (2014), Alibi
- Duke City Hit (as Max Austin) (2014), Alibi
- Duke City Desperado (as Max Austin) (2015), Alibi
- Shotgun Boogie (2016), Amazon
- Homesick Blues (2016), Amazon
- Side Eye (2017), Amazon
- Cold Cuts (2018), Amazon
- Upshot (2020), Amazon
- Trouble Town (2021), Amazon

=== Short fiction ===
- "Sanity Clause" (novella), in The Last Noel (2004), Worldwide
- "Payoff" (short story) in Damn Near Dead (2006), Busted Flush Press
- "Limbo" (short story), in the Mystery Writers of America anthology Crimes by Moonlight (2010), Berkley
- "Surf City" (short story), in West Coast Crime Wave (2011), Amazon
- "Showdown" (short story) (2012), Amazon
- "Found Money" (short story) (2012), Amazon
- "Party Doll" (novella) (2012), Amazon
- "Yvonne's Gone" (short story) (2012), Amazon
- "Cemetery Plot" (short story) (2013), Amazon (reprinted in the 2019 anthology Knucklehead Noir, Coffin Hop Press)
- "Up the Chimney"" (short story) in It's a Weird Winter Wonderland (2017), Coffin Hop Press
- "Babbling Brook" (short story) in Trouble & Strife (2019), Down and Out Books
- "Black Friday" (short story) in A Beast Without A Name (2019), Down and Out Books

=== Humor ===
- Trophy Husband (2003), University of New Mexico Press
- Rules for Successful Living (2020), Amazon

== Recognition ==
Brewer served two years on the national board of Mystery Writers of America and twice served as an Edgar Awards judge. He is also a member of International Thriller Writers and SouthWest Writers.

== See also ==
- Lonely Street
