= Mulholland Drive (film) =

2001 film by David Lynch

- Theatrical release poster
- Directed by: David Lynch
- Written by: David Lynch
- Produced by: Mary Sweeney; Alain Sarde; Neal Edelstein; Michael Polaire; Tony Krantz
- Starring: Naomi Watts; Laura Harring; Justin Theroux; Ann Miller; Robert Forster
- Cinematography: Peter Deming
- Edited by: Mary Sweeney
- Music by: Angelo Badalamenti; David Lynch (Note: Additional Music)
- Production companies: Les Films Alain Sarde; Asymmetrical Productions; Babbo Inc.; Le Studio Canal+; The Picture Factory
- Distributed by: Universal Pictures (United States) (Note: Some sources contradict each other as to whether Universal released Mulholland Drive on its own or through an arthouse division. Variety reported that Universal had bought U.S. distribution rights to the film and planned to release it under the Universal Focus banner, with some articles, reviews, and press kits also naming the division as distributor. However, the American Film Institute names Universal Pictures as the sole distributor of the film; copyright to the film in the U.S. was registered to Universal, with Universal Pictures' logo and a presenter credit appearing on existing U.S. theatrical release posters, trailers and early home video releases of the film in the U.S.); BAC Distribution (France)
- Release dates: May 16, 2001 (Cannes); October 12, 2001 (United States); November 21, 2001 (France)
- Running time: 146 minutes
- Countries: United States; France
- Language: English
- Budget: $15 million
- Box office: $20.1 million

Mulholland Drive (Note: Stylized as Mulholland Dr. in the opening credits and on the theatrical poster) is a 2001 mystery film written and directed by David Lynch. Its narrative is characterized by surrealist and neo-noir elements, and follows an aspiring actress (Naomi Watts) newly arrived in Los Angeles, where she befriends a car crash victim (Laura Harring) who is suffering from amnesia. Meanwhile, a Hollywood director (Justin Theroux) must deal with interference from the criminal underworld while casting his latest film.

The film was originally conceived as a television pilot for ABC, with footage shot and edited in 1999 as an open-ended mystery. After viewing Lynch's cut, however, ABC executives cancelled the proposed series. Lynch then secured funding from French production company StudioCanal to repurpose the footage into a film, for which he wrote an ending and filmed new material. The resulting film, edited and produced by Lynch's frequent collaborator (and briefly wife) Mary Sweeney, has left the story's events open to interpretation. Lynch's refusal to offer an explanation left audiences, critics, and even the film's own cast to speculate on its meaning. The film considerably boosted Watts's Hollywood profile and marked the last feature film role of veteran Hollywood star Ann Miller.

Mulholland Drive received critical acclaim, earning Lynch the Cannes Film Festival Award for Best Director and a nomination for the Academy Award for Best Director. It was also a moderate commercial success, grossing $20.1 million on a budget of $15 million. It is frequently cited as one of the greatest films of the 2000s, the 21st century, and of all time.

== Plot ==
The film opens with brightly lit images of couples dancing the jitterbug, over which a young blonde woman appears smiling and being applauded, followed by a point-of-view shot descending toward a pillow as someone lies down.

At night on Mulholland Drive, a brunette woman in an elegant evening gown narrowly escapes being shot by her chauffeur when another car crashes into them. Left with amnesia, she wanders into Los Angeles and hides in a vacant apartment. The next morning, she is discovered by Betty Elms, an aspiring actress newly arrived from Deep River, Ontario, who is staying at her aunt's place. The brunette adopts the name "Rita" after seeing a poster of Rita Hayworth and recalls only that she is in danger. The two become friends and discover a blue key and a large sum of cash in Rita's purse.

A man named Dan eats at a diner and recounts a nightmare to his friend in which he encounters a monstrous figure in the alley behind the diner. When they go outside to investigate, a filthy homeless person appears from around a corner and Dan collapses in shock.

Film director Adam Kesher is pressured by mob-connected businessmen to cast an unknown blonde, Camilla Rhodes, in his new film The Sylvia North Story. When he refuses, the mob shuts down production. He returns home to find his wife cheating on him, is beaten and thrown out, and discovers his bank account has been frozen. A mysterious cowboy warns him to cast Camilla. Meanwhile, incompetent hitman Joe Messing botches a job, killing bystanders.

Rita remembers the name "Diane Selwyn", and Betty locates her address in a phone book. A seemingly psychic neighbor warns that "someone is in trouble," and building manager Coco cautions Betty about letting Rita stay. Betty leaves for an audition, where she performs brilliantly; a casting agent brings her to Adam's audition for The Sylvia North Story. While Camilla auditions with a performance of "I've Told Ev'ry Little Star", Betty and Adam share a brief but intense glance before she slips away to meet Rita. Adam agrees to cast Camilla to appease the mob.

Betty and Rita visit Diane's apartment complex, where a neighbor who recently exchanged units with Diane says she has not been seen in some time and directs them to her apartment. Inside, they discover a woman's decomposing corpse on the bed. Rita panics and tries to cut her own hair, but Betty instead disguises her with a blonde wig. That night, they have sex and Betty twice confesses she is in love. Rita later wakes them both by chanting silencio, no hay banda ('silence, there is no band') in her sleep, and insists on visiting Club Silencio, where the host explains all performances are pre-recorded. Betty and Rita weep as Rebekah Del Rio performs a Spanish rendition of "Crying", and Betty discovers a blue box in her purse that matches Rita's key. Back at the apartment, Rita unlocks the box and realizes Betty has vanished, before disappearing herself.

The narrative shifts to Diane Selwyn, a depressed and struggling actress who looks exactly like Betty. She awakens in the bedroom where the corpse was found. Moving through her morning in a daze, she recalls memories of her former lover Camilla Rhodes, a femme fatale actress who resembles Rita: a volatile sexual encounter and breakup; being forced to watch Adam and Camilla kiss during a film rehearsal; and a dinner party at Adam's house, where Diane describes losing the lead in The Sylvia North Story to Camilla, to whom Adam announces his engagement. The memories culminate in Diane hiring Joe at the diner to kill Camilla, with a blue key promised as confirmation.

The homeless person behind the diner opens the blue box, releasing a tiny elderly couple – the same pair who accompanied Betty upon her arrival in Los Angeles. Back in the present, a traumatized Diane stares at the blue key on her coffee table. Terrorized by hallucinations of the elderly couple, she flees to her bedroom and commits suicide by shooting herself, dying in the same position as the earlier corpse. As the room fills with gunsmoke, Betty and Rita are shown smiling at each other. At Club Silencio, a blue-haired woman whispers "silencio".

== Cast ==
- Naomi Watts as Betty Elms / Diane Selwyn (credited as Betty and Diane Selwyn)
- Laura Harring as Rita / Camilla Rhodes (credited as Rita and Camilla Rhodes)
- Justin Theroux as Adam Kesher
- Ann Miller as Coco / Adam's Mother (credited as Coco)
- Mark Pellegrino as Joe Messing
- Brent Briscoe as Detective Domgaard
- Robert Forster as Detective McKnight
- Dan Hedaya as Vincenzo Castigliane
- Angelo Badalamenti as Luigi Castigliane
- Michael J. Anderson as Mr. Roque
- Robert Katims as Ray Hott
- Vincent Castellanos as Ed
- Diane Nelson as Heavy-Set Woman
- Rena Riffel as Laney
- Michael Des Barres as Billy
- Tony Longo as Kenny
- Katharine Towne as Cynthia
- Monty Montgomery as The Cowboy
- Lee Grant as Louise Bonner
- James Karen as Wally Brown
- Chad Everett as Jimmy Katz
- Wayne Grace as director Bob Brooker
- Rita Taggart as Linney James
- Michele Hicks as Nicki
- Michael Fairman as Jason
- Richard Green as The Magician
- Rebekah Del Rio as Herself
- Melissa George as Blonde Camilla Rhodes / The Mistress (credited as Camilla Rhodes)
- Geno Silva as Cookie / Emcee
- Lori Heuring as Lorraine Kesher
- Billy Ray Cyrus as Gene
- Jeanne Bates as Irene
- Dan Birnbaum as Irene's Companion
- Patrick Fischler as Dan
- Michael Cooke as Herb
- Melissa Crider as Waitress at Winkie's (Diane / Betty)
- Lisa Lackey as Carol
- Johanna Stein as Woman in #12
- Maya Bond as aunt Ruth
- David Schroeder as Robert Smith
- Marcus Graham as Mr. Darby
- Michael Weatherred as Hank
- Scott Coffey as Wilkins
- Bonnie Aarons as Bum Outside Winkie's
- Conte Candoli as Silencio Trumpet Player

== Themes and interpretations ==
Giving the film only the tagline, "A love story in the city of dreams," David Lynch refused to comment on Mulholland Drive's meaning or symbolism, leading to much discussion and multiple interpretations. The Christian Science Monitor film critic David Sterritt spoke with Lynch after the film screened at Cannes and wrote that the director "insisted that Mulholland Drive does tell a coherent, comprehensible story," unlike some of Lynch's earlier films like Lost Highway. On the other hand, Justin Theroux said of Lynch's feelings on the multiple meanings people perceive in the film, "I think he's genuinely happy for it to mean anything you want. He loves it when people come up with really bizarre interpretations. David works from his subconscious." The film was described as a neo-noir.

=== Dreams and alternative realities ===
An early interpretation of the film uses dream analysis to argue that the first part is a dream of the real Diane Selwyn, who has cast her dream-self as the innocent and hopeful, "Betty Elms," reconstructing her history and persona into something like an old Hollywood film. In the dream, Betty is successful, charming, and lives the fantasy life of a soon-to-be-famous actress. The remainder of the film presents Diane's real life, in which she has failed both personally and professionally. She arranges for Camilla, an ex-lover, to be killed; unable to cope with the guilt, she re-imagines her as the dependent, pliable amnesiac Rita. Clues to her inevitable demise, however, appear throughout her dream.

This interpretation is similar to what Naomi Watts construed; in a 2001 interview, she stated that "I thought Diane was the real character and that Betty was the person she wanted to be and had dreamed up. Rita is the damsel in distress and she's in absolute need of Betty, and Betty controls her as if she were a doll. Rita is Betty's fantasy of who she wants Camilla to be."

Watts' own early experiences in Hollywood paralleled those of Diane's. She endured some professional frustration before she became successful, auditioned for parts in which she did not believe, and encountered people who did not follow through with opportunities. She recalled, "There were a lot of promises, but nothing actually came off. I ran out of money and became quite lonely."

Michael Wilmington of the Chicago Tribune found that "everything in Mulholland Drive is a nightmare. It's a portrayal of the Hollywood golden dream turning rancid, curdling into a poisonous stew of hatred, envy, sleazy compromise and soul-killing failure. This is the underbelly of our glamorous fantasies, and the area Lynch shows here is realistically portrayed."

The Guardian asked six well-known film critics for their own perceptions of the overall meaning in Mulholland Drive. Neil Roberts of The Sun and Tom Charity of Time Out subscribe to the theory that Betty is Diane's projection of a happier life. Roger Ebert and Jonathan Ross seem to accept this interpretation, but both hesitate to overanalyze the film.

Ebert states, "There is no explanation. There may not even be a mystery." Ross observes that there are storylines that go nowhere: "Perhaps these were leftovers from the pilot it was originally intended to be, or perhaps these things are the non-sequiturs and subconscious of dreams." Philip French from The Observer sees it as an allusion to Hollywood tragedy, while Jane Douglas from the BBC rejects the theory of Betty's life as Diane's dream, but also warns against too much analysis.

David Lynch's 10 Clues to Unlocking This Thriller:

1. Pay particular attention in the beginning of the film: at least two clues are revealed before the credits.
2. Notice appearances of the red lampshade.
3. Can you hear the title of the film that Adam Kesher is auditioning actresses for? Is it mentioned again?
4. An accident is a terrible event... notice the location of the accident.
5. Who gives a key, and why?
6. Notice the robe, the ashtray, the coffee cup.
7. What is felt, realized and gathered at the club Silencio?
8. Did talent alone help Camilla?
9. Note the occurrences surrounding the man behind Winkies [sic].
10. Where is Aunt Ruth?

— Insert card from the 2002 DVD edition

Media theorist Siobhan Lyons similarly disagrees with the dream theory, arguing that it is a "superficial interpretation [which] undermines the strength of the absurdity of reality that often takes place in Lynch's universe." Instead, Lyons posits that Betty and Diane are in fact two different people who happen to look similar, a common motif among Hollywood starlets.

In a similar interpretation, Betty and Rita and Diane and Camilla may exist in parallel universes that sometimes interconnect. Another theory offered is that the narrative is a Möbius strip. It was also suggested that the entire film takes place in a dream, yet the identity of the dreamer is unknown. Repeated references to beds, bedrooms and sleeping represent the influence of dreams. Rita falls asleep several times; in between these episodes, disconnected scenes such as the men having a conversation at Winkie's, Betty's arrival in Los Angeles and the bungled hit take place, suggesting that Rita may be dreaming them.

The opening shot of the film zooms into a bed containing an unknown sleeper, instilling, according to film scholar Ruth Perlmutter, the necessity to question the reality of following events. Professor of dream studies Kelly Bulkeley argues that the early scene at the diner, being the only scene in which dreams or dreaming are explicitly mentioned, illustrates "revelatory truth and epistemological uncertainty in Lynch's film."

The monstrous being from the dream, who is the subject of conversation of the men in Winkie's, reappears at the end of the film right before and after Diane commits suicide. Bulkeley asserts that the lone discussion of dreams in that scene presents an opening to "a new way of understanding everything that happens in the movie."

Philosopher and film theorist Robert Sinnerbrink similarly notes that the images following Diane's apparent suicide undermine the "dream and reality" interpretation. After Diane shoots herself, the bed is consumed with smoke, and Betty and Rita are shown beaming at each other, after which a woman at Club Silencio whispers "silencio" as the screen fades to black. Sinnerbrink writes that the "concluding images float in an indeterminate zone between fantasy and reality, which is perhaps the genuinely metaphysical dimension of the cinematic image," also noting that it might be that the "last sequence comprises the fantasy images of Diane's dying consciousness, concluding with the real moment of her death: the final Silencio."

Referring to the same sequence, film theorist Andrew Hageman notes that "the ninety-second coda that follows Betty/Diane's suicide is a cinematic space that persists after the curtain has dropped on her living consciousness, and this persistent space is the very theatre where the illusion of illusion is continually unmasked."

Film theorist David Roche writes that Lynch films do not simply tell detective stories, but rather force the audience into the role of becoming detectives themselves to make sense of the narratives, and that Mulholland Drive, like other Lynch films, frustrates "the spectator's need for a rational diegesis by playing on the spectator's mistake that narration is synonymous with diegesis." In Lynch's films, the spectator is always "one step behind narration" and thus "narration prevails over diegesis."

Roche also notes that there are multiple mysteries in the film that ultimately go unanswered by the characters who meet dead ends, like Betty and Rita, or give in to pressures as Adam does. Although the audience still struggles to make sense of the stories, the characters are no longer trying to solve their mysteries. Roche concludes that Mulholland Drive is a mystery film not because it allows the audience to view the solution to a question, but the film itself is a mystery that is held together "by the spectator-detective's desire to make sense" of it.

=== A "poisonous valentine to Hollywood" ===
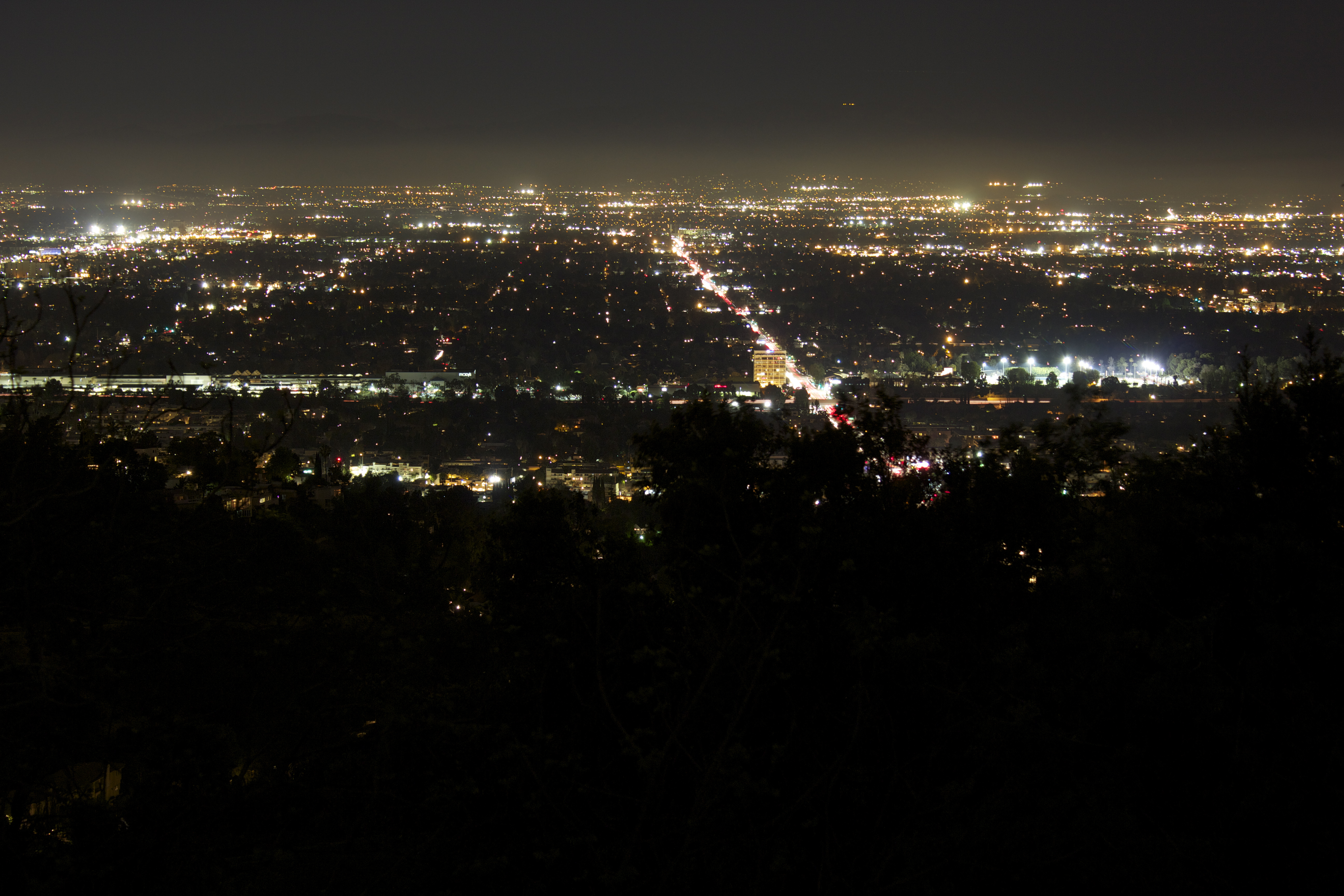
The view of Los Angeles from Mulholland Drive has become an iconic representation of the city.

Despite the proliferation of theories, critics note that no explanation satisfies all of the loose ends and questions that arise from the film. Stephen Holden of the New York Times writes, "Mulholland Drive has little to do with any single character's love life or professional ambition. The movie is an ever-deepening reflection on the allure of Hollywood and on the multiple role-playing and self-invention that the movie-going experience promises. ... What greater power is there than the power to enter and to program the dream life of the culture?" J. Hoberman from the Village Voice echoes this sentiment by calling it a "poisonous valentine to Hollywood."

Mulholland Drive has been compared with Billy Wilder's film noir Sunset Boulevard (1950), another tale about broken dreams in Hollywood, and early in the film Rita is shown crossing Sunset Boulevard at night. Apart from both titles being named after iconic Los Angeles streets, Mulholland Drive is "Lynch's unique account of what held Wilder's attention too: human putrefaction (a term Lynch used several times during his press conference at the New York Film Festival 2001) in a city of lethal illusions."

Lynch lived near Mulholland Drive, and stated in an interview, "At night, you ride on the top of the world. In the daytime you ride on top of the world, too, but it's mysterious, and there's a hair of fear because it goes into remote areas. You feel the history of Hollywood in that road." Watts also had experience with the road before her career was established: "I remember driving along the street many times sobbing my heart out in my car, going, 'What am I doing here?'"

Critic Gregory Weight cautions viewers against the cynicism of believing that Lynch presents only "the façade and that he believes only evil and deceit lie beneath it." As much as Lynch makes a statement about the deceit, manipulation and false pretenses in Hollywood culture, he also infuses nostalgia throughout the film and recognizes that real art comes from classic filmmaking, as Lynch cast and thereby paid tribute to veteran actors Ann Miller, Lee Grant and Chad Everett.

He also portrays Betty as extraordinarily talented and shows that her abilities are noticed by powerful people in the entertainment industry. Commenting on the contrasting positions between film nostalgia and the putrefaction of Hollywood, Steven Dillon writes that Mulholland Drive is critical of the culture of Hollywood as much as it is a condemnation of cinephilia.

Harring described her interpretation after seeing the film: "When I saw it the first time, I thought it was the story of Hollywood dreams, illusion and obsession. It touches on the idea that nothing is quite as it seems, especially the idea of being a Hollywood movie star. The second and third times I saw it, I thought it dealt with identity. Do we know who we are? And then I kept seeing different things in it. ... There's no right or wrong to what someone takes away from it or what they think the film is really about. It's a movie that makes you continuously ponder, makes you ask questions. I've heard over and over, 'This is a movie that I'll see again' or 'This is a movie you've got to see again.' It intrigues you. You want to get it, but I don't think it's a movie to be gotten. It's achieved its goal if it makes you ask questions."

=== Romantic content ===
The relationships between Betty and Rita, and Diane and Camilla have been variously described as "touching," "moving," as well as "titillating." The French critic Thierry Jousse, in his review for Cahiers du Cinéma, said that the love between the women depicted is "of lyricism practically without equal in contemporary cinema." In Film Comment, Phillip Lopate states that the pivotal romantic interlude between Betty and Rita was made poignant and tender by Betty's "understanding for the first time, with self-surprise, that all her helpfulness and curiosity about the other woman had a point: desire ... It is a beautiful moment, made all the more miraculous by its earned tenderness, and its distances from anything lurid."

Stephanie Zacharek of Salon magazine stated that the scene's "eroticism [was] so potent it blankets the whole movie, coloring every scene that came before and every one that follows." Betty and Rita were chosen by the Independent Film Channel as the emblematic romantic couple of the 2000s. Writer Charles Taylor said, "Betty and Rita are often framed against darkness so soft and velvety it's like a hovering nimbus, ready to swallow them if they awake from the film's dream. And when they are swallowed, when smoke fills the frame as if the sulfur of hell itself were obscuring our vision, we feel as if not just a romance has been broken, but the beauty of the world has been cursed."

Some film theorists have argued that Lynch inserts queerness in the aesthetic and thematic content of the film. The non-linear film is "incapable of sustaining narrative coherence," as Lee Wallace argues, and "lesbianism dissolves the ideological conventions of narrative realism, operating as the switch point for the contesting storyworlds within Lynch's elaborately plotted film." The presence of mirrors and doppelgangers throughout the film "are common representations of lesbian desire."

The co-dependency in the relationship between Betty and Rita—which borders on outright obsession—has been compared to the female relationships in two similar films, Ingmar Bergman's Persona (1966) and Robert Altman's 3 Women (1977), which also depict identities of vulnerable women that become tangled, interchanging and ultimately merged: "The female couples also mirror each other, with their mutual interactions conflating hero(ine) worship with same-sex desire."

Lynch pays direct homage to Persona in the scene where Rita dons the blonde wig, styled exactly like Betty's own hair. Rita and Betty then gaze at each other in the mirror "drawing attention to their physical similarity, linking the sequence to theme of embrace, physical coupling and the idea of merging or doubling." Mirroring and doubles, which are prominent themes throughout the film, serve to further queer the form and content of the film.

Several theorists have accused Lynch of perpetuating stereotypes and clichés of lesbians, bisexuals and lesbian relationships. Rita (the femme fatale) and Betty (the school girl) represent two classic stock lesbian characters; Heather Love identifies two key clichés used in the film: "Lynch presents lesbianism in its innocent and expansive form: lesbian desire appears as one big adventure, an entrée into a glamorous and unknown territory." Simultaneously, he presents the tragic lesbian triangle, "in which an attractive but unavailable woman dumps a less attractive woman who is figured as exclusively lesbian," perpetuating the stereotype of the bisexual "ending up with a man."

Maria San Filippo recognizes that Lynch relies on classic film noir archetypes to develop Camilla's eventual betrayal: these archetypes "become ingrained to such a degree that viewers are immediately cued that 'Rita' is not what she seems and that it is only a matter of time before she reveals her duplicitous nature." For Love, Diane's exclusively lesbian desire is "between success and failure, between sexiness and abjection, even between life and death" if she is rejected. In this context the character of Diane may be interpreted as the "tragic lesbian" cliché pining after the bisexual in the heterosexual relationship.

Love's analysis of the film notes the media's peculiar response to the film's lesbian content: "reviewers rhapsodized in particular and at length about the film's sex scenes, as if there were a contest to see who could enjoy this representation of female same-sex desire the most." She points out that the film used a classic theme in literature and film depicting lesbian relationships: Camilla as achingly beautiful and available, rejecting Diane for Adam.

Popular reaction to the film suggests the contrasting relationships between Betty and Rita and Diane and Camilla are "understood as both the hottest thing on earth and, at the same time, as something fundamentally sad and not at all erotic" as "the heterosexual order asserts itself with crushing effects for the abandoned woman."

Heterosexuality as primary is important in the latter half of the film, as the ultimate demise of Diane and Camilla's relationship springs from the matrimony of the heterosexual couple. At Adam's party, they begin to announce that Camilla and Adam are getting married; through laughs and kisses, the declaration is delayed because it is obvious and expected. The heterosexual closure of the scene is interrupted by a scene change.

As Lee Wallace suggests, by planning a hit against Camilla, "Diane circumvents the heterosexual closure of the industry story but only by going over to its storyworld, an act that proves fatal for both women, the cause and effect relations of the thriller being fundamentally incompatible with the plot of lesbianism as the film presents it."

Media portrayals of Naomi Watts's and Laura Elena Harring's views of their onscreen relationships were varied and conflicting. Watts said of the filming of the scene, "I don't see it as erotic, though maybe it plays that way. The last time I saw it, I actually had tears in my eyes because I knew where the story was going. It broke my heart a little bit." However, in another interview Watts stated, "I was amazed how honest and real all this looks on screen. These girls look really in love and it was curiously erotic."

While Harring was quoted saying, "The love scene just happened in my eyes. Rita's very grateful for the help Betty's given [her] so I'm saying goodbye and goodnight to her, thank you, from the bottom of my heart. I kiss her and then there's just an energy that takes us [over]. Of course, I have amnesia so I don't know if I've done it before, but I don't think we're really lesbians." Heather Love agreed somewhat with Harring's perception when she stated that identity in Mulholland Drive is not as important as desire: "who we are does not count for much—what matters instead is what we are about to do, what we want to do."

== Characters ==
Betty (Watts) arrives in Los Angeles; pictured with Irene (Jeanne Bates). Betty is bright and optimistic, in contrast to Diane—also played by Watts—in the later part of the film.

Betty Elms (Naomi Watts) is the bright and talented newcomer to Los Angeles, described as "wholesome, optimistic, determined to take the town by storm," and "absurdly naïve." Her perkiness and intrepid approach to helping Rita because it is the right thing to do is reminiscent of Nancy Drew for reviewers. Her entire persona at first is an apparent cliché of small-town naïveté. But it is Betty's identity, or loss of it, that appears to be the focus of the film.

For one critic, Betty performed the role of the film's consciousness and unconscious. Watts, who modeled Betty on Doris Day, Tippi Hedren and Kim Novak, observed that Betty is a thrill-seeker, someone "who finds herself in a world she doesn't belong in and is ready to take on a new identity, even if it's somebody else's." This has also led one theorist to conclude that since Betty had naïvely, yet eagerly entered the Hollywood system, she had become a "complicit actor" who had "embraced the very structure that" destroyed her. In an explanation of her development of the Betty character, Watts stated:

I had to therefore come up with my own decisions about what this meant and what this character was going through, what was dream and what was reality. My interpretation could end up being completely different, from both David and the audience. But I did have to reconcile all of that, and people seem to think it works.

Betty, however difficult to believe as her character is established, shows an astonishing depth in her audition. Previously rehearsed with Rita in the apartment, where Rita feeds her lines woodenly, the scene is "dreck" and "hollow; every line unworthy of a genuine actress's commitment," and Betty plays it in rehearsal as poorly as it is written. However, though nervous but plucky as ever at the audition, Betty enters the cramped room, and when pitted inches from her audition partner (Chad Everett), she turns it into a scene of powerful sexual tension that she fully controls and draws in every person in the room.

The sexuality erodes immediately as the scene ends and she stands before them shyly waiting for their approval. One film analyst asserts that Betty's previously unknown ability steals the show, specifically, taking the dark mystery away from Rita and assigning it to herself, and by Lynch's use of this scene, he illustrates his use of deception in his characters. Betty's acting ability prompts Ruth Perlmutter to speculate that if Betty is acting the role of Diane in either a dream or a parody of a film, ultimately her acting turns against her.

Rita (Laura Elena Harring) is the mysterious and helpless apparent victim, a classic femme fatale with her dark, strikingly beautiful appearance. Roger Ebert was so impressed with Harring that he said of her "all she has to do is stand there and she is the first good argument in 55 years for a Gilda remake." She serves as the object of desire, directly oppositional to Betty's bright self-assuredness. She is also the first character with whom the audience identifies, and as viewers know her as confused and frightened, not knowing who she is and where she is going, she represents their desire to make sense of the film through her identity.

Instead of threatening, she inspires Betty to nurture, console and help her. Her amnesia makes her a blank persona, which one reviewer notes is "the vacancy that comes with extraordinary beauty and the onlooker's willingness to project any combination of angelic and devilish onto her." A character analysis of Rita asserts that her actions are the most genuine of the first portion of the film, since she has no memory and nothing to use as a frame of reference for how to behave.

Todd McGowan, however, author of a book on themes in Lynch's films, states that the first portion of Mulholland Drive can be construed as Rita's fantasy, until Diane Selwyn is revealed; Betty is the object that overcomes Rita's anxiety about her loss of identity. According to film historian Steven Dillon, Diane transitions a former roommate into Rita: following a tense scene where the roommate collects her remaining belongings, Rita appears in the apartment, smiling at Diane.

Harring as the dark-haired woman

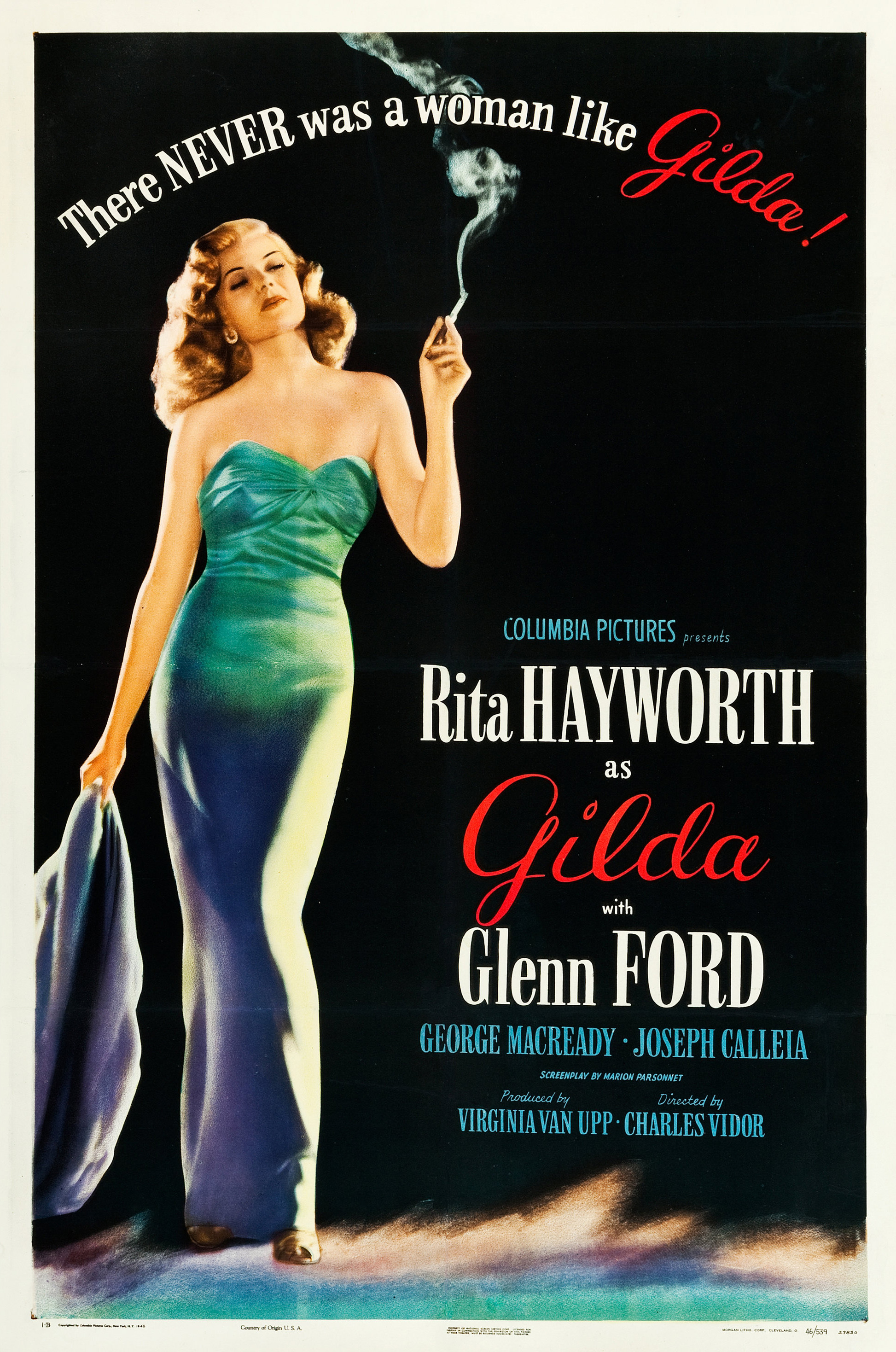
Gilda poster (1946)

The dark-haired woman assumes the name "Rita" after seeing the name on a poster. Her search for her identity has been interpreted by film scholars as representing the audience's desire to make sense of the film.

After Betty and Rita find the decomposing body, they flee the apartment and their images are split apart and reintegrated. David Roche notes that Rita's lack of identity causes a breakdown that "occurs not only at the level of the character but also at the level of the image; the shot is subjected to special effects that fragment their image and their voices are drowned out in reverb, the camera seemingly writing out the mental state of the characters".

Immediately they return to Betty's aunt's apartment where Rita dons a blonde wig—ostensibly to disguise herself—but making her look remarkably like Betty. It is this transformation that one film analyst suggests is the melding of both identities. This is supported by visual clues, like particular camera angles making their faces appear to be merging into one. This is further illustrated soon after by their sexual intimacy, followed by Rita's personality becoming more dominant as she insists they go to Club Silencio at 2 a.m., that eventually leads to the total domination by Camilla.

Diane Selwyn (Watts) is the palpably frustrated and depressed woman, who seems to have ridden the coattails of Camilla, whom she idolizes and adores, but who does not return her affection. She is considered to be the reality of the too-good-to-be-true Betty, or a later version of Betty after living too long in Hollywood. For Steven Dillon, the plot of the film "makes Rita the perfect empty vessel for Diane's fantasies", but because Rita is only a "blank cover girl" Diane has "invested herself in emptiness", which leads her to depression and apparently to suicide.

Hence, Diane is the personification of dissatisfaction, painfully illustrated when she is unable to climax while masturbating, in a scene that indicates "through blurred, jerky, point of view shots of the stony wall—not only her tears and humiliation but the disintegration of her fantasy and her growing desire for revenge". One analysis of Diane suggests her devotion to Camilla is based on a manifestation of narcissism, as Camilla embodies everything Diane wants and wants to be.

Although she is portrayed as weak and the ultimate loser, for Jeff Johnson, author of a book about morality in Lynch films, Diane is the only character in the second portion of the film whose moral code remains intact. She is "a decent person corrupted by the miscellaneous miscreants who populate the film industry". Her guilt and regret are evident in her suicide, and in the clues that surface in the first portion of the film. Rita's fear, the dead body and the illusion at Club Silencio indicate that something is dark and wrong in Betty and Rita's world. In becoming free from Camilla, her moral conditioning kills her.

Camilla Rhodes (Melissa George, Laura Elena Harring) is little more than a face in a photo and a name that has inspired many representatives of some vaguely threatening power to place her in a film against the wishes of Adam. Referred to as a "vapid moll" by one reviewer, she barely makes an impression in the first portion of the film, but after the blue box is opened and she is portrayed by Harring, she becomes a full person who symbolizes "betrayal, humiliation and abandonment", and is the object of Diane's sexual obsession and frustration.

Diane is a sharp contrast to Camilla, who is more voluptuous than ever, and who appears to have "sucked the life out of Diane". Immediately after telling Diane that "she drives her wild", Camilla tells her they must end their affair. On a film set where Adam is directing Camilla, he orders the set cleared, except for Diane—at Camilla's request—where Adam shows another actor just how to kiss Camilla correctly. Instead of punishing Camilla for such public humiliation, as is suggested by Diane's conversation with the bungling hit man, one critic views Rita as the vulnerable representation of Diane's desire for Camilla.

Adam Kesher (Justin Theroux) is established in the first portion of the film as a "vaguely arrogant", but apparently successful, director who endures one humiliation after another. Theroux said of his role, "He's sort of the one character in the film who doesn't know what the [hell's] going on. I think he's the one guy the audience says, 'I'm kind of like you right now. I don't know why you're being subjected to all this pain.'" After being stripped of creative control of his film, he is cuckolded by the pool cleaner (played by Billy Ray Cyrus), and thrown out of his own opulent house above Hollywood.

After he checks into a seedy motel and pays with cash, the manager arrives to tell him that his credit is no good. Witnessed by Diane, Adam is pompous and self-important. He is the only character whose personality does not seem to change completely from the first part of the film to the second. One analysis of Adam's character contends that because he capitulated and chose Camilla Rhodes for his film, that is the end of Betty's cheerfulness and ability to help Rita, placing the blame for her tragedy on the representatives of studio power.

Another analysis suggests that "Adam Kesher does not have the control, he wants and is willing to step over who or what is necessary to consolidate his career. Hungry for power, he uses the appearance of love or seduction only as one more tool. Love for power justifies that everything else is forgotten, be it pride, love or any other consideration. There are no regrets, it is Mulholland Drive in Los Angeles."

Minor characters include The Cowboy (Monty Montgomery), the Castigliani Brothers (Dan Hedaya and Angelo Badalamenti) and Mr. Roque (Michael J. Anderson), all of whom are somehow involved in pressuring Adam to cast Camilla Rhodes in his film. These characters represent the death of creativity for film scholars, and they portray a "vision of the industry as a closed hierarchical system in which the ultimate source of power remains hidden behind a series of representatives".

Ann Miller portrays Coco, the landlady who welcomes Betty to her wonderful new apartment. Coco, in the first part of the film, represents the old guard in Hollywood, who welcomes and protects Betty. In the second part of the film, however, she appears as Adam's mother, who impatiently chastises Diane for being late to the party and barely pays attention to Diane's embarrassed tale of how she got into acting.

== Style ==
Dwarf actor Michael J. Anderson, as Mr. Roque, was fitted with oversized prosthetic limbs to give him the appearance of an abnormally small head.

The filmmaking style of David Lynch has been written about extensively using descriptions like "ultraweird", "dark" and "oddball". Todd McGowan writes, "One cannot watch a Lynch film the way one watches a standard Hollywood film noir nor in the way that one watches most radical films." Through Lynch's juxtaposition of cliché and surreal, nightmares and fantasies, nonlinear story lines, camera work, sound and lighting, he presents a film that challenges viewers to suspend belief of what they are experiencing.

Many of the characters in Mulholland Drive are archetypes that can only be perceived as cliché: the new Hollywood hopeful, the femme fatale, the maverick director and shady powerbrokers that Lynch never seems to explore fully. Lynch places these often hackneyed characters in dire situations, creating dream-like qualities. By using these characters in scenarios that have components and references to dreams, fantasies and nightmares, viewers are left to decide, between the extremes, what is reality. One film analyst, Jennifer Hudson, writes of him, "Like most surrealists, Lynch's language of the unexplained is the fluid language of dreams."

David Lynch uses various methods of deception in Mulholland Drive. A shadowy figure named Mr. Roque, who seems to control film studios, is portrayed by dwarf actor Michael J. Anderson. Anderson, who has only two lines and is seated in an enormous wooden wheelchair, was fitted with oversized foam prosthetic arms and legs in order to portray his head as abnormally small.

During Adam and Camilla's party, Diane watches Camilla (played by Harring) with Adam on one arm, lean over and deeply kiss the same woman who appeared as Camilla (Melissa George) before the blue box was opened. Both then turn and smile pointedly at Diane. Film critic Franklin Ridgway writes that the depiction of such a deliberate "cruel and manipulative" act makes it unclear if Camilla is as capricious as she seems, or if Diane's paranoia is allowing the audience only to see what she senses.

In a scene immediately after Betty's audition, the film cuts to a woman singing without apparent accompaniment, but as the camera pulls backwards, the audience sees that it is a recording studio. In actuality, it is a sound stage where Betty has just arrived to meet Adam Kesher, that the audience realizes as the camera pulls back further. Ridgway insists that such deception through artful camera work sets the viewer full of doubt about what is being presented: "It is as if the camera, in its graceful fluidity of motion, reassures us that it (thinks it) sees everything, has everything under control, even if we (and Betty) do not."

According to Stephen Dillon, Lynch's use of different camera positions throughout the film, such as hand-held points of view, makes the viewer "identify with the suspense of the character in his or her particular space", but that Lynch at moments also "disconnects the camera from any particular point of view, thereby ungrounding a single or even a human perspective" so that the multiple perspectives keep contexts from merging, significantly troubling "our sense of the individual and the human".

Andrew Hageman similarly notes that the camera work in the film "renders a very disturbing sense of place and presence", such as the scene in Winkie's where the "camera floats irregularly during the shot-reverse shot dialogue" by which the "spectator becomes aware that a set of normally objective shots have become disturbingly subjective". Scholar Curt Hersey recognizes several avant-garde techniques used in the film including lack of transitions, abrupt transitions, motion speed, nontraditional camera movement, computer-generated imagery, nondiegetic images, nonlinear narration and intertextuality.

An emotionally troubled Diane exchanges words with Camilla. Diane's scenes were characterized by different lighting to symbolize her physical and spiritual impoverishment.

The first portion of the film that establishes the characters of Betty, Rita and Adam presents some of the most logical filmmaking of Lynch's career. The later part of the film that represents reality to many viewers, however, exhibits a marked change in cinematic effect that gives it a quality just as surreal as the first part. Diane's scenes feature choppier editing and dirtier lighting that symbolize her physical and spiritual impoverishment, which contrasts with the first portion of the film where "even the plainest decor seems to sparkle", Betty and Rita glow with light and transitions between scenes are smooth.

Lynch moves between scenes in the first portion of the film by using panoramic shots of the mountains, palm trees and buildings in Los Angeles. In the darker part of the film, sound transitions to the next scene without a visual reference where it is taking place. At Camilla's party, when Diane is most humiliated, the sound of crashing dishes is heard that carries immediately to the scene where dishes have been dropped in the diner, and Diane is speaking with the hit man.

Sinnerbrink also notes that several scenes in the film, such as the one featuring Diane's hallucination of Camilla after Diane wakes up, the image of the being from behind Winkie's after Diane's suicide, or the "repetition, reversal and displacement of elements that were differently configured" in the early portion of the film, creates the uncanny effect where viewers are presented with familiar characters or situations in altered times or locations. Similarly, Hageman has identified the early scene at Winkie's as "extremely uncanny", because it is a scene where the "boundaries separating physical reality from the imaginary realities of the unconscious disintegrate".

Author Valtteri Kokko has identified three groups of "uncanny metaphors"; the doppelgänger of multiple characters played by the same actors, dreams and an everyday object—primarily the blue box—that initiates Rita's disappearance and Diane's real life.

Another recurring element in Lynch's films is his experimentation with sound. He stated in an interview, "you look at the image and the scene silent, it's doing the job it's supposed to do, but the work isn't done. When you start working on the sound, keep working until it feels correct. There's so many wrong sounds and instantly you know it. Sometimes it's really magical." In the opening scene of the film, as the dark-haired woman stumbles off Mulholland Drive, silently it suggests she is clumsy. After Lynch added "a hint of the steam [from the wreck] and the screaming kids", however, it transformed Laura Elena Harring from clumsy to terrified.

Lynch also infused subtle rumblings throughout portions of the film that reviewers noted added unsettling and creepy effects. Hageman also identifies "perpetual and uncanny ambient sound", and places a particular emphasis on the scene where the man collapses behind Winkie's as normal sound is drowned out by a buzzing roar, noting that the noise "creates a dissonance and suspense that draws in the spectator as detective to place the sound and reestablish order". Mulholland Drive's ending with the woman at Club Silencio whispering is an example of Lynch's aural deception and surreality, according to Ruth Perlmutter, who writes, "The acting, the dreams, the search for identity, the fears and terrors of the undefined self are over when the film is over, and therefore, there is only silence and enigma."

== Production ==
=== Development ===
Originally conceived as a television series, Mulholland Drive began as a 90-minute pilot produced for Touchstone Television and intended for the ABC television network. Tony Krantz, the agent who was responsible for the development of Twin Peaks, was "fired up" about doing another television series. Lynch sold the idea to ABC executives based only on the story of Rita emerging from the car accident with her purse containing $125,000 in cash and the blue key, and Betty trying to help her figure out who she is. An ABC executive recalled, "I remember the creepiness of this woman in this horrible, horrible crash, and David teasing us with the notion that people are chasing her. She's not just 'in' trouble—she is trouble. Obviously, we asked, 'What happens next?' And David said, 'You have to buy the pitch for me to tell you.'"

Lynch had hesitations about returning to television, after his experience making Twin Peaks and the rapid cancellation of another series he and Mark Frost made for ABC, On the Air. "With all the commercials and its terrible sound and picture...TV is a hair of a joke really". Nevertheless, Lynch described the attractiveness of the longer format: "I'm a sucker for a continuing story ... Theoretically, you can get a very deep story and you can go so deep and open the world so beautifully, but it takes time to do that." The story included surreal elements, much like Lynch's earlier series Twin Peaks. Groundwork was laid for story arcs, such as the mystery of Rita's identity, Betty's career and Adam Kesher's film project. The planned series would also have featured a romance between Betty and Adam.

The pilot's budget was $7 million, on the proviso that Lynch shot a closed ending in case the network didn't order a series. While initially enthusiastic, ABC's expectations soon clashed with Lynch's vision. They found his pacing too slow and objected to his casting of Naomi Watts and Laura Harring. According to Krantz the two were "a little old...and ABC thinks Betty is too aw-shucks and Okie-from-Muskogee, and that at the beginning, after the accident, Rita looks kind of goofy." Even Lynch's penchant for cigarettes clashed with ABC's standards-and-practices department, which didn't want the network to appear as if it condoned smoking. Lynch made script changes to accommodate ABC, but in a later scene whispered to Justin Theroux, "Take a really fucking big drag—fucking love that cigarette".

When Lynch showed ABC a rough cut of the pilot, the person who saw it, according to Lynch, was watching it at six in the morning and was having coffee and standing up. He hated the pilot, and ABC immediately cancelled it. Pierre Edelman, Lynch's friend from Paris, came to visit and started talking to him about the film being a feature. Edelman went back to Paris. Canal+ wanted to give Lynch money to make it into a feature and it took a year to negotiate.

Actress Sherilyn Fenn stated in a 2014 interview that the original idea came during the filming of Twin Peaks, as a spin-off film for her character of Audrey Horne.

=== Casting ===
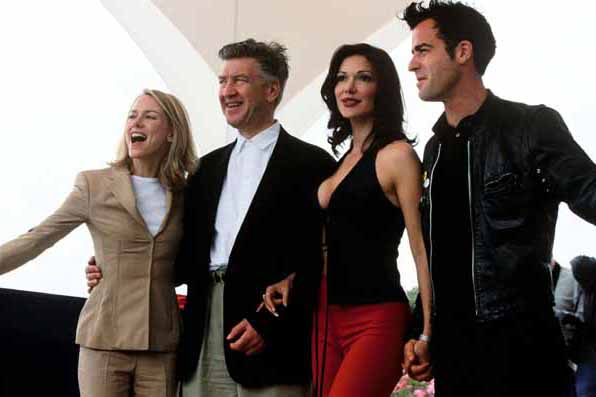
Naomi Watts, David Lynch, Laura Elena Harring and Justin Theroux at the 2001 Cannes Film Festival

Lynch cast Naomi Watts and Laura Harring by their photographs. He called them in separately for half-hour interviews and told them that he had not seen any of their previous works in film or television. Harring considered it fateful that she was involved in a minor car accident on the way to the first interview, only to learn her character would also be involved in a car accident in the film. Watts arrived wearing jeans for the first interview, direct from the airplane from New York City. Lynch asked her to return the next day "more glammed up".

She was offered the part two weeks later. Lynch explained his selection of Watts, "I saw someone that I felt had a tremendous talent, and I saw someone who had a beautiful soul, an intelligence—possibilities for a lot of different roles, so it was a beautiful full package." Justin Theroux also met Lynch directly after his airplane flight. After a long flight with little sleep, Theroux arrived dressed all in black, with untidy hair. Lynch liked the look and decided to cast Adam wearing similar clothes and the same hairstyle.

=== Filming ===
Filming for the television pilot began on location in Los Angeles in February 1999 and took six weeks. Ultimately, the network was unhappy with the pilot and decided not to place it on its schedule. Objections included the nonlinear storyline, the ages of Harring and Watts (whom they considered too old), cigarette smoking by Ann Miller's character and a close-frame shot of dog feces in one scene. Lynch remembered, "All I know is, I loved making it, ABC hated it, and I don't like the cut I turned in. I agreed with ABC that the longer cut was too slow, but I was forced to butcher it because we had a deadline, and there wasn't time to finesse anything. It lost texture, big scenes and storylines, and there are 300 tape copies of the bad version circulating around. Lots of people have seen it, which is embarrassing, because they're bad-quality tapes, too. I don't want to think about it."

One night, I sat down, the ideas came in, and it was a most beautiful experience. Everything was seen from a different angle ... Now, looking back, I see that [the film] always wanted to be this way. It just took this strange beginning to cause it to be what it is.

— David Lynch, 2001

The script was later rewritten and expanded when Lynch decided to transform it into a feature film. Lynch explained the process of developing an ending for the unfinished story: "The day came when I got the greenlight to turn it into a feature, and I had zero ideas. I just hadn’t been thinking about it. Then came the day I needed to get those ideas, and that night, I sat down during my meditation and in there, I say like a string of pearls, all the ideas came, all at once, and there it was."

He added that, "Now, looking back, I see that [the film] always wanted to be this way. It just took this strange beginning to cause it to be what it is." The result was an extra eighteen pages of material that included the romantic relationship between Rita and Betty and the events that occurred after the blue box was opened. Watts was relieved that the pilot was dropped by ABC. She found Betty too one-dimensional without the darker portion of the film that was put together afterward. Most of the new scenes were filmed in October 2000, funded with $7 million from French production company StudioCanal.

Theroux described approaching filming without entirely understanding the plot: "You get the whole script, but he might as well withhold the scenes you're not in, because the whole turns out to be more mystifying than the parts. David welcomes questions, but he won't answer any of them ... You work kind of half-blindfolded. If he were a first-time director and hadn't demonstrated any command of this method, I'd probably have reservations. But it obviously works for him." Theroux noted that the only answer Lynch did provide was that he was certain that Theroux's character, a Hollywood director, was not meant to be Lynch. Watts stated that she tried to bluff Lynch by pretending she had the plot figured out, and that he delighted in the cast's frustration. Ben Stiller visited the set one day; Lynch thought he was an extra and offered him a background role, but he declined.

"I'm not going to lie: I felt very vulnerable," Laura Harring said of filming the sex scene between Harring and Watts' characters. "I was in my dressing room and was on the verge of tears. It's hard. There are a lot of people there ... Naomi and I were friends. It was pretty awkward."

== Soundtrack ==
The soundtrack of Mulholland Drive was supervised by Angelo Badalamenti, who collaborated on previous Lynch projects Blue Velvet and Twin Peaks. Badalamenti, who was nominated for awards from the American Film Institute (AFI) and the British Academy of Film and Television Arts (BAFTA) for his work on the film, also has a cameo as an espresso aficionado and mobster.

Reviewers noted that Badalamenti's ominous score, described as his "darkest yet", contributes to the sense of mystery as the film opens on the dark-haired woman's limousine, that contrasts with the bright, hopeful tones of Betty's first arrival in Los Angeles, with the score "acting as an emotional guide for the viewer". Film music journalist Daniel Schweiger remarks that Badalamenti's contribution to the score alternates from the "nearly motionless string dread to noir jazz and audio feedback", with "the rhythms building to an explosion of infinite darkness." Badalamenti described a particular technique of sound design applied to the film, by which he would provide Lynch with multiple ten- to twelve-minute tracks at slow tempo, that they called "firewood", from which Lynch "would take fragments and experiment with them resulting in a lot of film's eerie soundscapes."

Lynch uses two pop songs from the 1960s directly after one another, playing as two actresses are auditioning by lip synching them. According to an analyst of music used in Lynch films, Lynch's female characters are often unable to communicate through normal channels and are reduced to lip-synching or being otherwise stifled. Connie Stevens's "Sixteen Reasons" is the song being sung while the camera pans backwards to reveal several illusions, and Linda Scott's version of "I've Told Ev'ry Little Star" is the audition for the first Camilla Rhodes, that film scholar Eric Gans considers a song of empowerment for Betty. Originally written by Jerome Kern as a duet, sung by Linda Scott in this rendition by herself, Gans suggests it takes on a homosexual overtone in Mulholland Drive.

Unlike "Sixteen Reasons", however, portions of "I've Told Ev'ry Little Star" are distorted to suggest "a sonic split-identity" for Camilla. When the song plays, Betty has just entered the sound stage where Adam is auditioning actresses for his film, and she sees Adam, locks eyes with him and abruptly flees after Adam has declared "This is the girl" about Camilla, thereby avoiding his inevitable rejection.

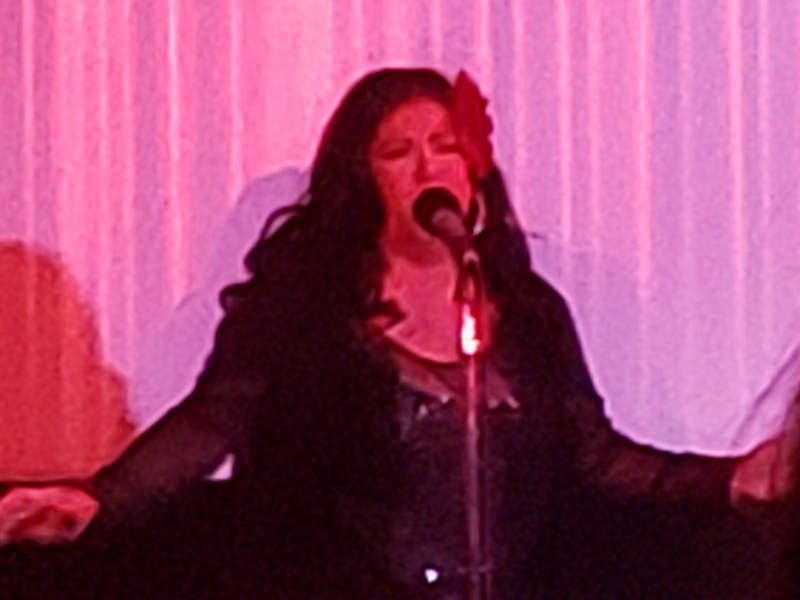
Rebekah Del Rio performing "Llorando", popularized in the film's Club Silencio sequence

At the hinge of the film is a scene in an unusual late night theater called Club Silencio where a performer announces "No hay banda (there is no band) ... but yet we hear a band", variated between English, Spanish and French. Described as "the most original and stunning sequence in an original and stunning film", Rebekah Del Rio's Spanish a cappella rendition of "Crying", named "Llorando", is praised as "show-stopping ... except that there's no show to stop" in the sparsely attended Club Silencio. Lynch had wanted to use Roy Orbison's version of "Crying" in Blue Velvet, but changed his mind when he heard Orbison's "In Dreams".

Del Rio, who popularized the Spanish version and who received her first recording contract on the basis of the song, stated that Lynch flew to Nashville where she was living, and she sang the song for him once without knowing that he was recording her. Lynch wrote a part for her in the film and used the version she sang for him in Nashville.

The song tragically serenades the lovers Betty and Rita, who sit spellbound and weeping, moments before their relationship disappears and is replaced by Diane and Camilla's dysfunction. According to one film scholar, the song and the entire theater scene marks the disintegration of Betty's and Rita's personalities, as well as their relationship. With the use of multiple languages and a song to portray such primal emotions, one film analyst states that Lynch exhibits his distrust of intellectual discourse and chooses to make sense through images and sounds. The disorienting effect of the music playing although del Rio is no longer there is described as "the musical version of Magritte's painting Ceci n'est pas une pipe [sic]".

== Release and reception ==
Mulholland Drive premiered at the 2001 Cannes Film Festival in May to major critical acclaim. Lynch was awarded the Best Director prize at the festival, shared with Joel Coen for The Man Who Wasn't There. It drew positive reviews from many critics and some of the strongest audience reactions of Lynch's career.

The film was publicized with cryptic posters bearing the abbreviation "Mulholland Dr."

=== Box office ===
Universal Pictures released Mulholland Drive theatrically in 66 theaters in the United States on October 12, 2001, grossing $587,591 over its opening weekend. It eventually expanded to its widest release of 247 theaters, ultimately grossing $7,220,243 at the U.S. box office. TVA Films released the film theatrically in Canada on October 26, 2001. In other territories outside the United States, the film grossed $12,897,096, for a worldwide total of $20,117,339 on the film's original release, plus much smaller sums on later re-releases.

=== Reception and legacy ===
Since its release, Mulholland Drive has received "both some of the harshest epithets and some of the most lavish praise in recent cinematic history". On review aggregator website Rotten Tomatoes, the film has an approval rating of 84% based on 264 reviews. The website's critical consensus reads, "David Lynch's dreamlike and mysterious Mulholland Drive is a twisty neo-noir with an unconventional structure that features a mesmerizing performance from Naomi Watts as a woman on the dark fringes of Hollywood." On Metacritic, which assigns a normalized rating to reviews, the film has a weighted average score of 87 out of 100 based on 37 critics, indicating "universal acclaim".

Roger Ebert of the Chicago Sun-Times, who had often been dismissive of Lynch's work, awarded the film four stars out of four, writing, "David Lynch has been working toward Mulholland Drive all of his career, and now that he's arrived there I forgive him for Wild at Heart and even Lost Highway. At last his experiment doesn't shatter the test tubes. The movie is a surrealist dreamscape in the form of a Hollywood film noir, and the less sense it makes, the more we can't stop watching it".

In The New York Times, Stephen Holden wrote that the film "ranks alongside Fellini's 8½ and other auteurist fantasias as a monumental self-reflection" and added: "Looked at lightly, it is the grandest and silliest cinematic carnival to come along in quite some time ... on a more serious level, its investigation into the power of movies pierces a void from which you can hear the screams of a ravenous demon whose appetites can never be slaked." Edward Guthmann of the San Francisco Chronicle called it "exhilarating ... for its dreamlike images and fierce, frequently reckless imagination" and added, "there's a mesmerizing quality to its languid pace, its sense of foreboding and its lost-in-time atmosphere ... it holds us, spellbound and amused, for all of its loony and luscious, exasperating 146 minutes [and] proves that Lynch is in solid form—and still an expert at pricking our nerves".

In Rolling Stone, Peter Travers observed, "Mulholland Drive makes movies feel alive again. This sinful pleasure is a fresh triumph for Lynch, and one of the best films of a sorry-ass year. For visionary daring, swooning eroticism and colors that pop like a whore's lip gloss, there's nothing like this baby anywhere."

J. Hoberman of The Village Voice stated, "This voluptuous phantasmagoria ... is certainly Lynch's strongest movie since Blue Velvet and maybe Eraserhead. The very things that failed him in the bad-boy rockabilly debacle of Lost Highway—the atmosphere of free-floating menace, pointless transmigration of souls, provocatively dropped plot stitches, gimcrack alternate universes—are here brilliantly rehabilitated." A. O. Scott of The New York Times wrote that, while some might consider the plot an "offense against narrative order", the film is "an intoxicating liberation from sense, with moments of feeling all the more powerful for seeming to emerge from the murky night world of the unconscious".

Among detractors, Rex Reed of The New York Observer said that it was the worst film he had seen in 2001, calling it "a load of moronic and incoherent garbage". In New York, Peter Rainer observed, "Although I like it more than some of his other dreamtime freakfests, it's still a pretty moribund ride ... Lynch needs to renew himself with an influx of the deep feeling he has for people, for outcasts, and lay off the cretins and hobgoblins and zombies for a while." In The Washington Post, Desson Howe called it "an extended mood opera, if you want to put an arty label on incoherence".

Todd McCarthy of Variety found much to praise—"Lynch cranks up the levels of bizarre humor, dramatic incident and genuine mystery with a succession of memorable scenes, some of which rank with his best"—but also noted, "the film jumps off the solid ground of relative narrative coherence into Lynchian fantasyland ... for the final 45 minutes, Lynch is in mind-twisting mode that presents a form of alternate reality with no apparent meaning or logical connection to what came before. Although such tactics are familiar from Twin Peaks and elsewhere, the sudden switcheroo to head games is disappointing because, up to this point, Lynch had so wonderfully succeeded in creating genuine involvement."

James Berardinelli also criticized it, saying: "Lynch cheats his audience, pulling the rug out from under us. He throws everything into the mix with the lone goal of confusing us. Nothing makes any sense because it's not supposed to make any sense. There's no purpose or logic to events. Lynch is playing a big practical joke on us." Film theorist Ray Carney notes, "You wouldn't need all the emotional back-flips and narrative trap doors if you had anything to say. You wouldn't need doppelgangers and shadow-figures if your characters had souls."

Later, Mulholland Drive was named the best film of the decade by the Los Angeles Film Critics Association, Cahiers du cinéma, IndieWire, Slant Magazine, Reverse Shot, The Village Voice and Time Out New York, who asked rhetorically in a reference to the September 11 attacks, "Can there be another movie that speaks as resonantly—if unwittingly—to the awful moment that marked our decade? ... Mulholland Drive is the monster behind the diner; it's the self-delusional dream turned into nightmare." It was also voted best of the decade in a Film Comment poll of international "critics, programmers, academics, filmmakers and others", and by the magazine's readers.

It appeared on lists among the ten best films of the decade, coming in third according to The Guardian, Rolling Stone critic Peter Travers, the Canadian Press, Access Hollywood critic Scott Mantz, and eighth on critic Michael Phillips's list. In 2010 it was named the second best arthouse film ever by The Guardian. The film was voted as the 11th best film set in Los Angeles in the last 25 years by a group of Los Angeles Times writers and editors with the primary criterion of communicating an inherent truth about the L.A. experience. Empire magazine placed Mulholland Drive at number 391 on their list of the five hundred greatest films ever.

It has also been ranked number 38 on the Channel 4 program 50 Films to See Before You Die. In 2011, online magazine Slate named Mulholland Drive in its piece on "New Classics" as the most enduring film since 2000. Ebert added Mulholland Drive to his canon of "Great Movies": "David Lynch loves movies, genres, archetypes and obligatory shots. Mulholland Drive employs the conventions of film noir in a pure form. One useful definition of noirs is that they're about characters who have committed a crime or a sin, are immersed with guilt, and fear they're getting what they deserve. Another is that they've done nothing wrong, but it nevertheless certainly appears as if they have. The second describes Hitchcock's favorite plot, the Innocent Man Wrongly Accused. The first describes the central dilemma of Mulholland Dr. Yet it floats in an uneasy psychic space, never defining who sinned. The film evokes the feeling of noir guilt while never attaching to anything specific. A neat trick. Pure cinema."

In the British Film Institute's 2012 Sight & Sound poll, Mulholland Drive was ranked the 28th greatest film ever made, and in the 2022 poll, its ranking rose to eighth. Having received 40 critics' votes, it is one of three films from the 21st century to be included in the top 50, along with In the Mood for Love (2000) and Portrait of a Lady on Fire (2019). In a 2015 BBC poll of the 100 greatest American films, it was ranked 21st. The following year, Mulholland Drive was named as the greatest film of the 21st century in a poll conducted by BBC Culture.

In July 2021, the 4K restoration of Mulholland Drive was shown in the Cannes Classics section at the 2021 Cannes Film Festival. In 2021, members of Writers Guild of America West (WGAW) and Writers Guild of America, East (WGAE) voted its screenplay 41st in "WGA’s 101 Greatest Screenplays of the 21st Century (So Far)".

In June 2025, the film ranked second on The New York Times' list of "The 100 Best Movies of the 21st Century", and it was also ranked as such on a "Readers' Choice" edition of the poll. In July 2025, it ranked number 9 on Rolling Stone's list of "The 100 Best Movies of the 21st Century".

The 2022 Sight and Sound Greatest Films of All Time critics' poll ranked it at No. 8, while the director's poll ranked it at No. 22. The BBC and IndieWire named it the best film of the 21st century, and the LA Film Critics Association listed it as the best film of the 2000s. In 2025, The Ringer named Watts's performance as the greatest of the 21st century.

=== Home media ===
The film was released on VHS and DVD by Universal Studios Home Video on April 9, 2002, in the United States and Canada, with few special features. It was released without chapter stops, a feature that Lynch objects to on the grounds that it "demystifies" the film.

Nick Coccellato of Eccentric Cinema gave the film a rating of nine out of ten and the DVD release an eight out of ten, saying that the lack of special features "only adds to the mystery the film itself possesses, in abundance". Special features in later versions and overseas versions of the DVD include a Lynch interview at the Cannes Film Festival and highlights of the debut of the film at Cannes.

Optimum Home Entertainment released Mulholland Drive to the European market on Blu-ray as part of its StudioCanal Collection on September 13, 2010. New special features exclusive to this release include: an introduction by Thierry Jousse; In the Blue Box, a retrospective documentary featuring directors and critics; two making-of documentaries: On the Road to Mulholland Drive and Back to Mulholland Drive, and several interviews with people involved in making the film. It is the second David Lynch film in this line of Blu-rays after The Elephant Man.

The Criterion Collection has released several versions of Mulholland Drive. In October 2015, it released a 2K digital transfer of a restoration of the film on Blu-Ray and DVD, along with interviews, portions of the 2005 edition of Chris Rodley's book Lynch on Lynch, and other special features. It was Lynch's second film to receive a Criterion Collection release on DVD and Blu-ray, following Eraserhead in 2014. Mulholland Drive was part of Criterion's first batch of 4K Ultra HD Blu-ray releases in 2021. Although the 2K Blu-ray release was under license from Focus Features and Universal Studios Home Entertainment, Criterion's parent company Janus Films subsequently acquired the distribution rights.

=== Awards and honors ===
Accolades for Mulholland Drive
Award	Category	Recipient	Result
AFI Awards	Actor of the Year (Female): Movies	Naomi Watts	Nominated
AFI Awards	Composer of the Year	Angelo Badalamenti	Nominated
AFI Awards	Director of the Year	David Lynch	Nominated
AFI Awards	Movie of the Year	Mulholland Drive	Nominated
Academy Awards	Achievement in Directing	David Lynch	Nominated
ALMA Awards	Outstanding Actress in a Motion Picture	Laura Harring	Won
BAFTA Awards	Best Editing	Mary Sweeney	Won
BAFTA Awards	Best Film Music	Angelo Badalamenti	Nominated
Cannes Film Festival	Best Director	David Lynch (shared)	Won
Chicago Film Critics Awards	Best Picture	Mulholland Drive	Won
Chicago Film Critics Awards	Best Director	David Lynch	Won
Chicago Film Critics Awards	Best Actress	Naomi Watts	Won
César Awards	Best Foreign Film	David Lynch	Won
Golden Globe Awards	Best Motion Picture – Drama	Mulholland Drive	Nominated
Golden Globe Awards	Best Director – Motion Picture	David Lynch	Nominated
Golden Globe Awards	Best Screenplay	David Lynch	Nominated
Golden Globe Awards	Best Original Score	Angelo Badalamenti	Nominated
Independent Spirit Awards	Best Cinematography	Peter Deming	Won
Los Angeles Film Critics Association	Best Director	David Lynch	Won
National Society of Film Critics	Best Actress	Naomi Watts	Won
New York Film Critics Circle Awards	Best Film	Mulholland Drive	Won
Online Film Critics Society	Best Picture	Mulholland Drive	Won
Online Film Critics Society	Best Director	David Lynch	Won
Online Film Critics Society	Best Actress	Naomi Watts	Won
Online Film Critics Society	Best Original Screenplay	David Lynch	Won
Online Film Critics Society	Best Original Score	Angelo Badalamenti	Won
Online Film Critics Society	Best Breakthrough Performance	Naomi Watts	Won

== See also ==
- List of films featuring miniature people

== Bibliography ==
- Dillon, Steven (2006). The Solaris Effect: Art and Artifice in Contemporary American Film. University of Texas Press. ISBN 978-0-292-71345-1.
- Filippo, Maria San (2013). The B Word: Bisexuality in Contemporary Film and Television. Indiana University Press. ISBN 978-0-253-00892-3.
- Johnson, Jeff (2004). Pervert in the Pulpit: Morality in the Works of David Lynch. McFarland & Company. ISBN 978-0-7864-1753-7.
- McGowan, Todd (2007). The Impossible David Lynch. Columbia University Press. ISBN 978-0-231-13955-7.
- Odell, Colin; Le Blanc, Michelle (2007). David Lynch. Kamera Books. ISBN 978-1-84243-225-9.
- Sheen, Erica; Davison, A., eds. (2004). The Cinema of David Lynch: American Dreams, Nightmare Visions. Wallflower Press. ISBN 978-1-903364-85-7.
- Woods, Paul, ed. (2000). Weirdsville USA: The Obsessive Universe of David Lynch. Plexus Publishing. ISBN 978-0-85965-291-9.
