= 2001 National Society of Film Critics Awards =

Annual US film awards ceremony

36th NSFC Awards

January 4, 2002

Best Film:
Mulholland Dr.

The 36th National Society of Film Critics Awards, given on 4 January 2002, honored the best in film for 2001.

== Winners ==
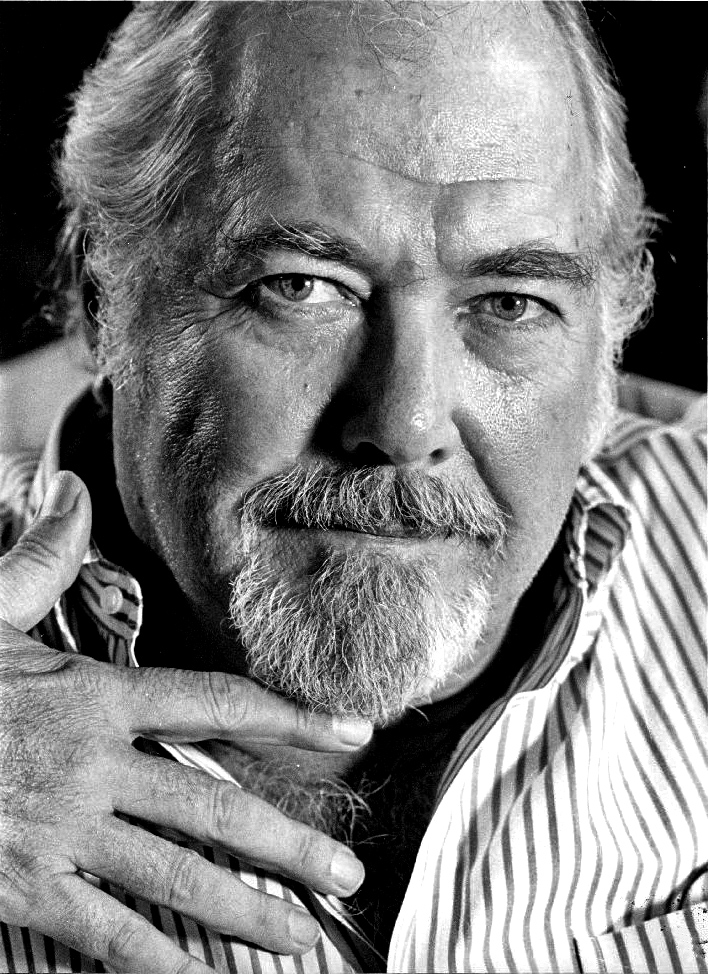
Robert Altman, Best Director winner

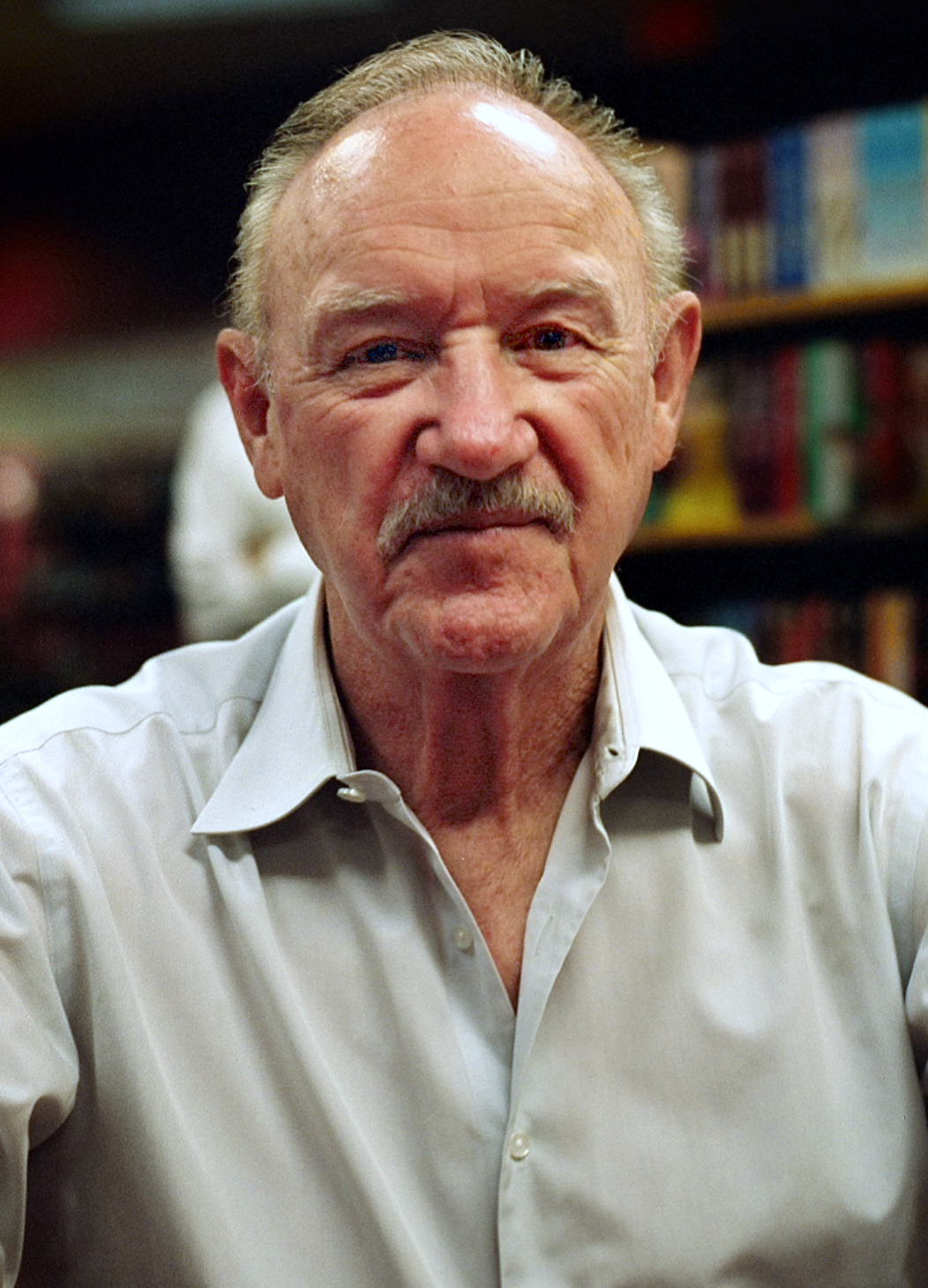
Gene Hackman, Best Actor winner

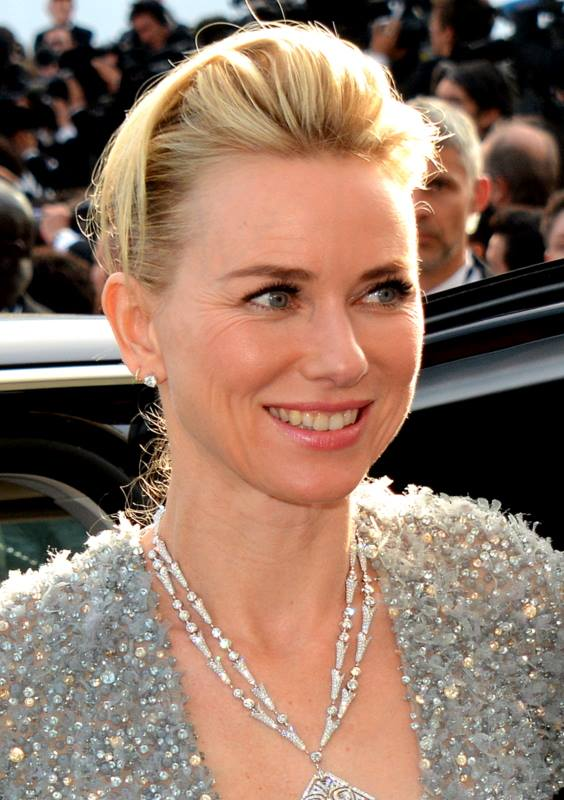
Naomi Watts, Best Actress winner

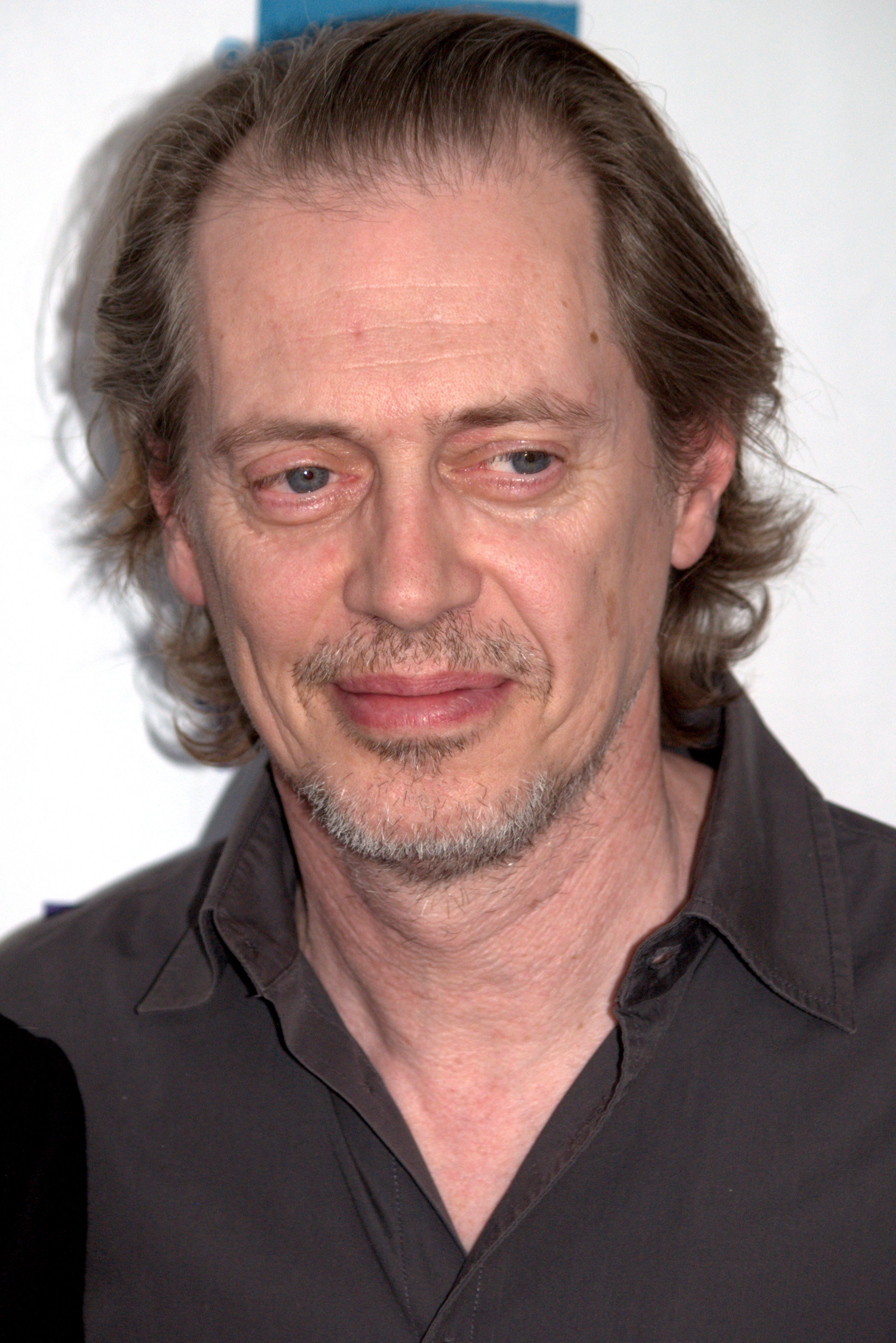
Steve Buscemi, Best Supporting Actor winner

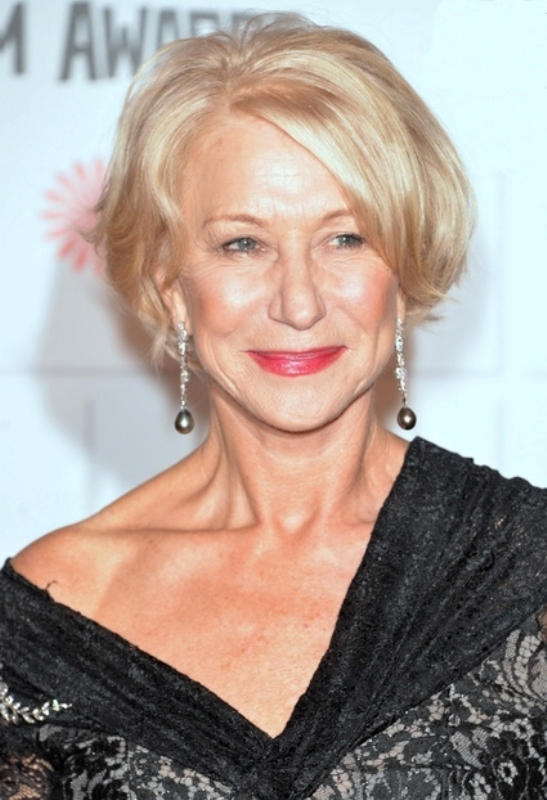
Helen Mirren, Best Supporting Actress winner

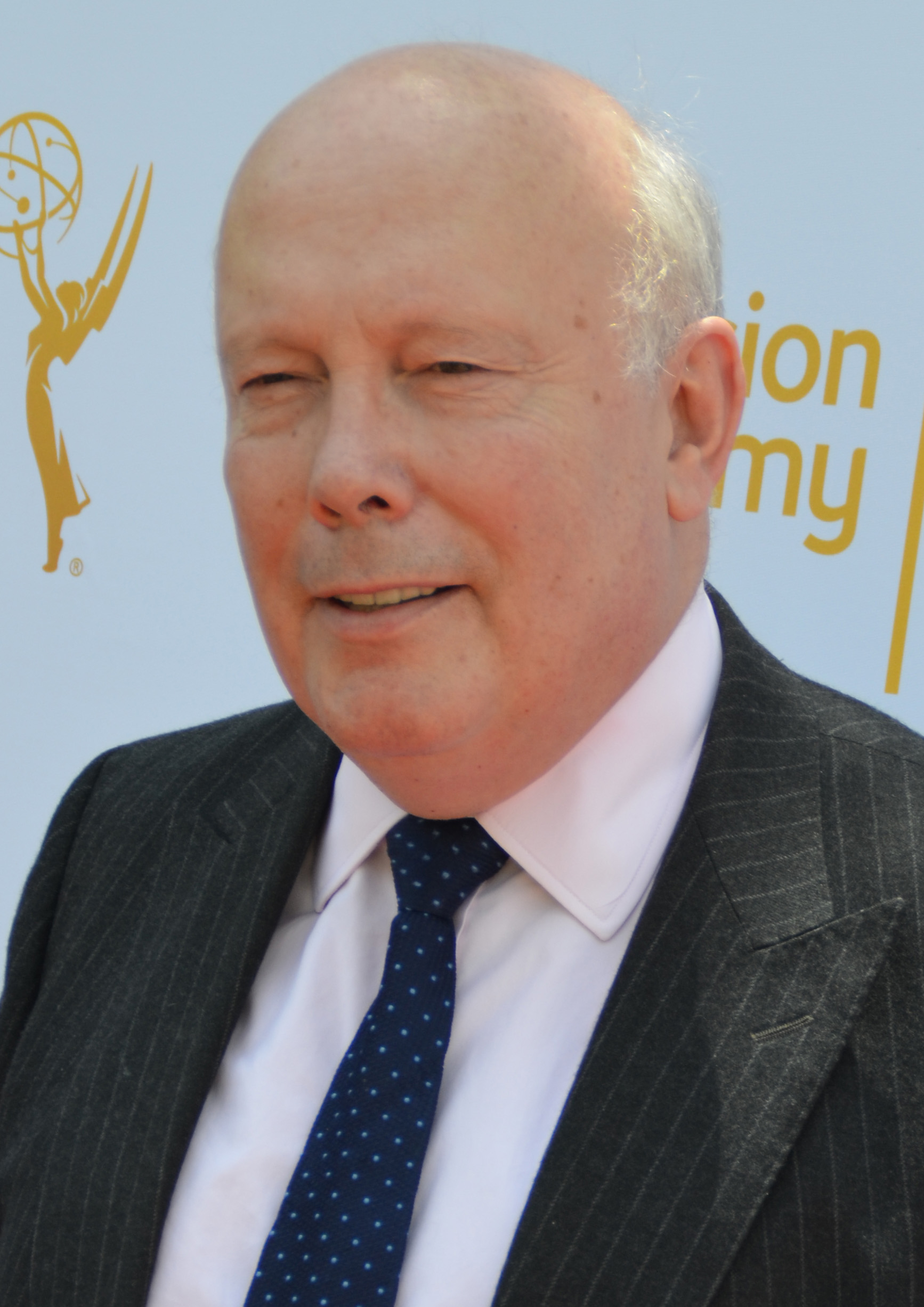
Julian Fellowes, Best Screenplay winner

=== Best Picture ===
1. Mulholland Drive
2. Gosford Park
3. The Lord of the Rings: The Fellowship of the Ring

=== Best Director ===
1. Robert Altman – Gosford Park
2. David Lynch – Mulholland Drive
3. Peter Jackson – The Lord of the Rings: The Fellowship of the Ring

=== Best Actor ===
1. Gene Hackman – The Royal Tenenbaums
2. Denzel Washington – Training Day
3. Tom Wilkinson – In the Bedroom

=== Best Actress ===
1. Naomi Watts – Mulholland Drive
2. Sissy Spacek – In the Bedroom
3. Charlotte Rampling – Under the Sand (Sous le sable)

=== Best Supporting Actor ===
1. Steve Buscemi – Ghost World
2. Ben Kingsley – Sexy Beast
3. Brian Cox – L.I.E.

=== Best Supporting Actress ===
1. Helen Mirren – Gosford Park
2. Maggie Smith – Gosford Park
3. Marisa Tomei – In the Bedroom

=== Best Screenplay ===
1. Julian Fellowes – Gosford Park
2. Daniel Clowes and Terry Zwigoff – Ghost World
3. Christopher Nolan – Memento

=== Best Cinematography ===
1. Christopher Doyle and Mark Lee Ping Bin – In the Mood for Love (Faa yeung nin wa)
2. Peter Deming – Mulholland Drive
3. Roger Deakins – The Man Who Wasn't There

=== Best Foreign Language Film ===
1. In the Mood for Love (Faa yeung nin wa)
2. The Circle (Dayereh)
3. Amores perros

=== Best Non-Fiction Film ===
1. The Gleaners and I (Les glaneurs et la glaneuse)
2. The Endurance: Shackleton's Legendary Antarctic Expedition
3. My Voyage to Italy (Il mio viaggio in Italia)

=== Experimental Film Award ===
- Waking Life

=== Film Heritage Award ===
- My Voyage to Italy (Il mio viaggio in Italia)

=== Special Citation ===
- Faith Hubley
