= Speaking of Sex =

2001 film

- Theatrical release poster
- Directed by: John McNaughton
- Written by: Gary Tieche
- Produced by: Pierre Edelman; Alain Sarde; Rob Scheidlinger
- Starring: Bill Murray; James Spader; Lara Flynn Boyle; Jay Mohr
- Cinematography: Ralf D. Bode
- Edited by: Elena Maganini
- Music by: George S. Clinton
- Production companies: Canal; Les Films Alain Sarde; Omnibus
- Distributed by: Lionsgate
- Release date: October 5, 2001 (Chicago International Film Festival)
- Running time: 97 minutes
- Countries: Canada; United States; France
- Language: English
- Budget: $16 million

Speaking of Sex is a 2001 Canadian/American/French comedy film directed by John McNaughton and starring Bill Murray, James Spader, Lara Flynn Boyle, and Jay Mohr.

== Premise ==
When a couple having marital problems see a female marriage counselor who advertises on a bus bench, she recommends that the wife see a male depression expert, who ends up initiating an affair with the wife.

== Cast ==
- Bill Murray as Ezri Stovall
- James Spader as Dr. Roger Klink
- Lara Flynn Boyle as Dr. Emily Page
- Jay Mohr as Dan
- Melora Walters as Melinda
- Phil LaMarr as Joel Johnson Jr.
- Megan Mullally as Jennifer Klink
- Nathaniel Arcand as Calvin
- Nick Offerman as Sheriff Panghorn
- Catherine O'Hara as Connie Barker

== Production ==
Filming for the film began on May 24, 2000, in Calgary, Alberta, Canada.

== Reception ==
Nathan Rabin of The A.V. Club graded the film a B.
