= James Brown (Elvis impersonator) =

James Brown a.k.a. Jim Brown
- Also known as: The King
- Born: 1968 (age 57–58); Belfast, Northern Ireland
- Years active: 1998–present
- Website: www.homeoftheking.com

James "The King" Brown (born 1968) is a Belfast-born Elvis Presley tribute act known for his covers of songs done in the style of Elvis. In the vein of "songs that Elvis should have done," Brown often performs songs by other artists such as "Whole Lotta Rosie", originally by AC/DC, and "Crazy Little Thing Called Love", originally by Queen.

== Career ==
Initially a career Belfast postman, Brown became a singer after the positive reaction he received performing "Suspicious Minds" and "The Wonder of You" at a bar in Belfast, and attracting the attention of local singer-songwriter, record producer & former Energy Orchard frontman Bap Kennedy.

Brown's first album, Gravelands was originally recorded for and released by the London-based Dressed To Kill label in 1997 before being licensed to EMI Electrola in 1998. The album contained his biggest hits "Come as You Are" by Nirvana and "Whole Lotta Rosie" by AC/DC. Gravelands would go on to sell half a million copies. In 2000, Brown released his second album Return to Splendor which contained the hit "Under The Bridge" originally by Red Hot Chili Peppers. Brown also toured with the Fun Lovin' Criminals and Stereophonics. Due to a management dispute in 2000, he parted ways with his band. Thanks to music producer Zeus B. Held, Brown gained a new set of German backing instrumentalists, mostly from Freiburg. Brown's cover of Roger Miller's 1964 single "King of the Road" was featured in a 2001 Audi commercial on German TV and subsequently released as a single. In 2005 Brown released his third studio album Any Way You Want Me via Browman Records – his first with original songs rather than cover versions.

In 2009 Brown recorded "When the Rebel Comes Home", "Waiting for this Moment" and "Until it Happens" at Ardent Studios for the film Lonely Street (2009). In April 2014 he released Return to Gravelands, a 'best of' album consisting of tracks from his first three albums and the three otherwise unavailable contributions from Lonely Street. This was accompanied by a European tour of the same name, culminating in a one-off performance at Belfast's Empire on 9 May. Brown continues to perform live in Northern Ireland but occasionally travels to other countries throughout Europe, mainly Germany, to perform" September 2020 saw the release of the second Willow Springs (a project by fellow NI musician, Mark Crockard) album "Night-time Radio" featuring two original songs written for Jim - "Hello Friend" and "To be with you".

== Personal life ==
Brown is married, with five children, and lives in Newtownabbey.

== Discography ==
Gravelands (album)

- Released: 1998
- Format: CD
- Label: Electrola
- Producer: Bap Kennedy
- Chart position: No. 15 in Germany

Return To Splendor (album)

- Released: 2000
- Format: CD
- Label: Electrola
- Chart position: No. 15 in Germany; No. 97 in Switzerland

"King of the Road (single)" from the album King of the road : der Hit aus der Audi Werbung

- Released: 2001
- Format: CD
- Label: Electrola

Live in Concert (album)

- Released: 2004
- Format: CD

Any Way You Want Me (album)

- Released: 2005
- Format: CD

The American Sound Show (album)

- Released: 2007
- Format: CD
- Label: Elvis-Presley-Gesellschaft

Lonely Street (film soundtrack)

- Released: 2009
- Producer: Danny Seraphine
- Tracks: "When the Rebel Comes Home", "Waiting for this Moment", "Until It Happens"
