= Black River (2001 film) =

2001 American television film by Jeff Bleckner

- Film Poster
- Created by: Dean Koontz
- Based on: Black River by Dean Koontz
- Screenplay by: Daniel Taplitz
- Directed by: Jeff Bleckner
- Starring: Jay Mohr; Lisa Edelstein; Ann Cusack
- Theme music composer: J. Peter Robinson
- Country of origin: United States
- Original language: English

Production
- Producer: J. Boyce Harman Jr.
- Cinematography: John S. Bartley
- Editor: Geoffrey Rowland
- Running time: 84 min.
- Production companies: Fox Television Studios; Patchett Kaufman Entertainment; Bayonne Entertainment; Black River Productions

Original release
- Network: Fox
- Release: July 6, 2001

Black River is an American television movie about a writer who comes upon the town of Black River, only to find that it will not let him leave. Based on a short story by Dean Koontz, the film premiered July 6, 2001 on Fox.

== Synopsis ==
A writer called Boyd 'Bo' Aikens (Jay Mohr), recently unemployed and divorced, leaves Los Angeles hoping to find a place to start over. He enters an ordinary-looking town called Black River, and stops for lunch. However, after a disturbing encounter with one of the locals, he changes his mind and leaves. No sooner does he get out of town than his cell rings. The unidentified caller admonishes him for his unpleasantness. Moments later, he is pulled over and arrested; it seems that his car was listed as stolen. By the time the mess is straightened out, his car has been towed out of town, requiring him to reluctantly spend the night in town.

At the same time, another new arrival shows up. Her name is Laura Crosby, and it seems that she is the long-lost sister of a local waitress. Laura and Bo become friendly, but Bo receives a call that night in his hotel room, warning him to stay away from her. Later on, the local who harassed Bo (revealed to be an abusive drunk) has a mysterious and fatal accident.

The next day, Bo goes to the police department to get his car, only to find it has been taken to a salvage yard and crushed. He tries to purchase a train ticket out, but the trains have all been diverted away from town. He then tries to purchase a used car, but his credit cards are declined, and his cash assets have been transferred to Black River's local bank and then frozen. While in the bank, he receives another mysterious phone call. The caller identifies himself as "Pericles", and admonishes Bo to give Black River a chance. When Bo responds angrily, the bank's electrical and alarm systems go berserk, sending him fleeing.

Bo attempts to hitchhike out of town, but the man who offers him a ride has a mysterious electrical fire in his car. Desperate, Bo attempts to flee on foot, but a laser beam comes out of the sky, forcing him to turn back. Now at the end of his rope, Bo barges into the town mayor's office and demands to know who "Pericles" is. The phone rings, and Pericles informs them that he is sending a car. This is actually a satellite-controlled vehicle (SCV), originally designed to be controlled by its owner's remote control, but now controlled by Pericles and autonomously roaming about the town. It delivers Bo to a local computer company.

The company's owner explains their recent project: to create an artificial intelligence that can go anywhere in cyberspace. Such an entity would be able to see through any camera, hear and speak through any phone line, hack computers at will, and even control remotely accessed systems (like the SCV, or the orbital laser system that shot at Bo earlier). They thought that they had failed, but Bo realizes that they had succeeded beyond their wildest dreams. Now realizing that there is nowhere he can go where Pericles can't follow, Bo resigns himself to his situation. His assigned realtor shows him a lovely house, complete with a computer for writing, and even a dog virtually identical to his recently deceased pet.

A year later, it is revealed that Bo and Laura are now citizens in good standing of Black River, and still seeing each other (it seems that Pericles's prior admonishment was reverse psychology). When another new arrival shows up, however, Bo slips him a note suggesting that if he wants to leave, he should do so quickly, which suggests that Pericles might not have him totally under its control.

== Inconsistencies ==
Throughout the narrative, Pericles exhibits abilities that seem implausible for its nature, including the particularly striking act of levitating a garden hose, an object far removed from high technology. Moreover, despite its vested interest in ensuring Bo remains in Black River, Pericles paradoxically engages in behavior that torments and mistreats him, actions that seem counterproductive to its goals.

== Select cast ==
- Jay Mohr - Boyd 'Bo' Aikens
- Lisa Edelstein - Laura Crosby
- Ann Cusack - Mandy Pruell
- Stephen Tobolowsky - Mayor Tom Thompson
