= Pierre Edelman =

French film producer

- Born: 1944 (age 81–82)
- Occupations: Film producer, studio executive, actor
- Notable work: Mulholland Drive; Life is a miracle Inland Empire; All About My Mother
- Spouses: Victoria Abril; Helena Kallianiotes; Bernadette Lafont

Pierre Edelman (born in 1944) is a French film producer and former actor.

== Career ==
In the 1970s, Pierre Edelman worked in a workshop in the Sentier district of Paris, specializing in denim. He became a collaborator of Colette and Jacques Nivelle, specialists in stonewashed jeans. In the mid-1980s, he worked as an assistant to photographer Jean-Marie Périer in Los Angeles on the production of advertising films.

He then became a journalist and later a producer at Ciby 2000, the company founded in 1990 by Francis Bouygues, and later at StudioCanal in the 2000s. It was through him that David Lynch, frustrated with the American production system that restricted his creative freedom, was able to make films in France—first with Ciby 2000 and later with StudioCanal, thanks to Edelman introducing him to Alain Sarde. Edelman produced Lynch’s work throughout the 1990s and into the 2000s, from Twin Peaks: Fire Walk with Me (1992) and Lost Highway (1997) to Mulholland Drive (2001). The latter film came to fruition and became a cornerstone of the director’s filmography thanks to Edelman’s intervention. At StudioCanal at the time, he proposed to Lynch that he turn his failed ABC pilot into a feature film. Mulholland Drive would soon be ranked among the best films of the early 21st century.

With Ciby 2000 and later StudioCanal, Edelman also produced films by Pedro Almodóvar, including High Heels (1991), The Flower of My Secret (1995), and All About My Mother (1999), as well as Underground by Emir Kusturica, which won the Palme d’Or at the Cannes Film Festival in 1995. At an informal party on a Cannes beach after the Palme d’Or ceremony, Pierre Edelman defended Carole Bouquet when a fight broke out.

Kusturica said of him: "I owe a lot to men like Pierre Edelman who put everything on the line so I could make Underground, especially since after the Arizona Dream scandal, I was blacklisted by the insurance companies."

== Personal life ==
He dated Béatrice de Cambronne in the 1960s, was in a relationship with Bernadette Lafont in the early 1970s, Helena Kallianiotes at the end of the same decade, and later Victoria Abril, with whom he had two children in the 1990s.

In the spring of 2023, he disappeared from public view. In March of that year, his disappearance was reported to the police in Paris’s 8th arrondissement by long-time friend, journalist, and essayist Guillaume Durand. During an investigation, the newspaper Le Monde tracked him down in May 2025 at a Paris nursing home, where he now resides after suffering a stroke.

== Filmography ==
Pierre Edelman participated in films as an actor, producer, and screenwriter.

=== Actor ===
- Mes petites amoureuses (Jean Eustache – 1974)
- Vincent mit l'âne dans un pré (et s'en vint dans l'autre) (Pierre Zucca – 1975)
- Double messieurs (Jean-François Stévenin – 1986)

==== As Himself ====
- Things We Did Last Summer (TV film, Gary Weis – 1978)
- Man of Cinema – Pierre Rissient (Documentary, Todd McCarthy – 2007)

==== Consultant ====
- Extérieur, nuit (Jacques Bral – 1980)
- All About My Mother (Pedro Almodóvar – 1999)
- Inland Empire (David Lynch – 2006)

=== Executive Producer ===
- High Heels (Tacones lejanos, Pedro Almodóvar – 1991)
- Memory & Desire (Niki Caro – 1998)
- The Straight Story (David Lynch – 1999)
- Mulholland Drive (David Lynch – 2001)
- Life Is a Miracle (Emir Kusturica – 2004)

=== Producer ===
- The Wife (Tom Noonan – 1995)
- Speaking of Sex (John McNaughton – 2001)
- All or Nothing (Mike Leigh – 2002)

=== Screenwriter ===
- The Companion (L'accompagnant), co-writer, (Pavel Giroud – 2015)
