= Nikki Cox =

American actress

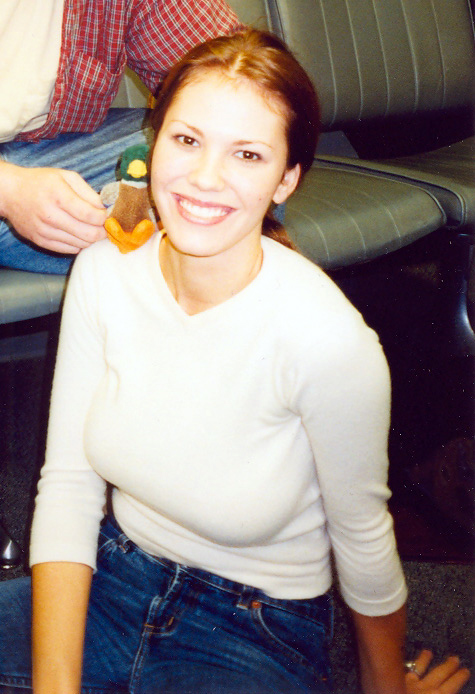
- Cox during an October 2000 promotional tour for Nikki
- Born: June 2, 1978 (age 48)
- Other name: Nikki Cox Mohr (formerly)
- Occupation: Actress
- Years active: 1987-2011
- Spouse: Jay Mohr (m. 2006; div. 2018)
- Partner: Bobcat Goldthwait (1997–2005)
- Children: 1

Nikki Cox (born June 2, 1978) is an American actress, known for her roles on the television series Unhappily Ever After, Las Vegas, The Norm Show, and Nikki.

== Career ==
Cox began her career at the age of four, when she appeared as a dancer in several ballet productions and TV specials. She began acting at the age of ten, making appearances in several movies and guest-starring on shows such as Baywatch, Star Trek: The Next Generation, Mama's Family, Eerie, Indiana, and Blossom. She also appeared in General Hospital from 1993 to 1995, and had a recurring role on the Saturday morning program California Dreams.

Her appearances on various TV shows led to her first prime-time role as Tiffany Malloy on the sitcom Unhappily Ever After, which ran on The WB from 1995 to 1999 for a total of five seasons. Her brother Matthew guest-starred on a handful of episodes, including one where he wore a "Ghostface" mask (the type of mask featured in Scream).

After Unhappily Ever After was cancelled (she appeared in all 100 episodes), Cox went on to portray Taylor Clayton, a former call-girl turned social worker on the ABC television sitcom The Norm Show which lasted for three seasons (she appeared in 27 of its 54 episodes). Next she starred as Nikki White in Nikki, another sitcom vehicle that lasted for two seasons on The WB (2000–2002).

The most successful show Cox co-starred in following her time on Unhappily Ever After was on the NBC TV drama Las Vegas from 2003 to 2007 for a total of four seasons. She played Mary Connell for 88 episodes. However, Cox would not appear on the fifth and final season of the show. On May 20 and 23, 2005, her Las Vegas character crossed over to NBC's soap opera Passions to coincide with the arrival of two new characters introduced on Las Vegas.

In 2006, she became the spokesmodel for the online gambling website Sportsbook.com. In 2009, she provided the voice of Jenna in Leisure Suit Larry: Box Office Bust. That same year, she also appeared in Lonely Street, a comedy, starring Robert Patrick, Jay Mohr, Ernie Hudson, and Lindsay Price. In 2016, Cox was nominated as the sole writer for Mohr's album Happy. And A Lot for the Grammy Award for Best Comedy Album at the 58th Annual Grammy Awards.

== Personal life ==
Cox dated co-star Kevin Connolly from Unhappily Ever After while the two were on the show. In 1997, she was engaged to Bobcat Goldthwait, who voiced the character of Mr. Floppy on that same show.

On December 29, 2006, she married actor and stand-up comedian Jay Mohr in Los Angeles, California. The two met on the set of Las Vegas. In December 2008, Mohr petitioned a Los Angeles court to allow him to legally add her last name to his, changing his name to Jon Ferguson Cox Mohr. Cox and Mohr have a son. On the May 16, 2017, episode of The Adam Carolla Show, Mohr confirmed that he and Cox were "in the middle" of a divorce. Their divorce was finalized in August 2018.

== Filmography ==
Film
Year	Title	Role	Notes
1988	Mac and Me	Dancer	Uncredited
1988	Moonwalker	Dancer	Segment: "Badder"
1991	Terminator 2: Judgment Day	Girl #1	
1996	The Glimmer Man	Millie	
1997	Sub Down	Holliday's Girlfriend	Direct-to-video release Alternative title: Sub Down: Take the Dive
2000	Nutty Professor II: The Klumps	Miss Taylor Stamos	Credited as "Bright Girl"
2001	Don's Plum	Karen	
2002	Run Ronnie Run	Kayla	
2009	Lonely Street	Bambi	
2011	A Christmas Wedding Tail	Cheri (Voice)	

Television
Year	Title	Role	Notes
1987	Mama's Family	Little Iola Boylan	1 episode
1988	Webster	Didi	1 episode
1989	The Ryan White Story	Andrea White	Television film
1989	Star Trek: The Next Generation	Sarjenka	1 episode ('Pen Pals')
1990	A Family for Joe	Carrie Lewis	Television film
1990	Night Court	Toni	1 episode
1991	Murphy Brown	Pretty Girl	1 episode
1991	Eerie, Indiana	Janet	1 episode
1991–1994	Baywatch	Charlene "Charlie" Reed	2 episodes
1992	Davis Rules	Janine	1 episode
1992	Danger Island	Ariel	Television film Alternative title: The Presence
1993	Bloodlines: Murder in the Family	Student #2	Television film
1993	Blossom	Cynthia	4 episodes
1993	Boy Meets World	Heather	1 episode
1993	The Nanny	Cindy Wentworth	1 episode
1993–1995	General Hospital	Gina Williams #1	Unknown episodes
1994	California Dreams	Allison	2 episodes
1994	Someone Like Me	Samantha "Sam" Stepjak	Unknown episodes
1995–1999	Unhappily Ever After	Tiffany Malloy	Main role; 100 episodes
1996	Sister, Sister	Nikki	1 episode
1996	She Cried No	Kellie	Television film Alternative title: Freshman Fall
1996–1997	Pearl	Margaret Woodrow	2 episodes
1998	The Drew Carey Show	Kristen Carey	1 episode
1998	The Steve Harvey Show	Herself	1 episode
1998–1999	Penn & Teller's Sin City Spectacular	Herself	1 episode
1999–2001	The Norm Show	Taylor Clayton	27 episodes
2000	Buzz Lightyear of Star Command	Petra (voice)	1 episode
2000–2002	Nikki	Nikki White	41 episodes
2003–2007	Las Vegas	Mary Connell	87 episodes
2006	The Jake Effect	Liza Wheeler	7 episodes
2007	Fugly	Crystal Stump	Television film
2008	Ghost Whisperer	Nina Haley	1 episode
2009	The Spectacular Spider-Man	Silver Sable (voice)	2 episodes
