= Lonely Street (film) =

- Directed by: Peter Ettinger
- Written by: Peter Ettinger
- Based on: Lonely Street by Steve Brewer
- Produced by: Chris Brinker; Kevin Chapman; Jay Mohr; Patrick Newall; Cori Fry; Matthew Barry; Nancy Green-Keyes; Bud S. Smith
- Starring: Jay Mohr; Katt Williams; Nikki Cox; Joe Mantegna; Robert Patrick
- Cinematography: Marco Fargnoli
- Edited by: M. Scott Smith; Paul Kumpata; Sean Puglisi
- Release dates: September 2008 (Boston); August 11, 2009 (United States)
- Country: United States
- Language: English

Lonely Street is a 2008 American comedy-thriller film directed by Peter Ettinger and starring Jay Mohr, Robert Patrick, Nikki Cox, Joe Mantegna and Katt Williams. The film is based on the novel of the same name by Steve Brewer.

The film premiered at the 2008 Boston Film Festival.

== Plot summary ==
Bubba Mabry (Mohr), a notoriously gullible private detective, is hired to snoop on a tabloid reporter by a mysterious celebrity known only as Mr. Aaron (Patrick). When the tabloid reporter is murdered, Mabry becomes the prime suspect in his death.

== Cast ==
- Jay Mohr as Bubba Mabry
- Robert Patrick as Mr. Aaron
- Nikki Cox as Bambi
- Joe Mantegna as Jerry Finkelman
- Katt Williams as Rodent
- Ernie Hudson as Capt. Morgan
- Ken Davitian as Motel Owner
- Lindsay Price as Felicia
- Mike Starr as JG
- Ellen Albertini Dow as Lydia - Librarian
- Paul Rodriguez as Det. Romero
- Gerry Bednob as Bongo
- Heather Wahlquist as Kathy Grabow
- David Mattey as Snake
- Kevin Chapman as Cowboy Cop
- Perry Anzilotti as Marty Grabow
- John F. O'Donohue as Hank 'The Tank' Tankersley
- Marnie Alexenburg as Bartender
- Lacey Eberl as Pop Star

== Soundtrack ==
Elvis impersonator James "The King" Brown was brought to Ardent Studios by soundtrack producer Danny Seraphine to record When the Rebel Comes Home and Waiting for this Moment.
