= Pen Pals (Star Trek: The Next Generation) =

- Star Trek: The Next Generation episode
- Episode no.: Season 2 Episode 15
- Directed by: Winrich Kolbe
- Story by: Hannah Louise Shearer
- Teleplay by: Melinda M. Snodgrass
- Cinematography by: Edward R. Brown
- Production code: 141
- Original air date: May 1, 1989

Guest appearances
- Nicholas Cascone – Davies; Nikki Cox – Sarjenka; Ann H. Gillespie – Hildebrant; Colm Meaney – Miles O'Brien; Whitney Rydbeck – Alans

Episode chronology
← Previous "The Icarus Factor"	Next → "Q Who"
- Star Trek: The Next Generation season 2

"Pen Pals" is the fifteenth episode of the second season of the American science fiction television series Star Trek: The Next Generation, the 41st episode overall, it was first broadcast on May 1, 1989.

Set in the 24th century, the series follows the adventures of the Starfleet crew of the Federation starship Enterprise-D. In this episode, Acting Ensign Wesley Crusher learns to manage a science team, and in the primary plot, focusing on Starfleet's Prime Directive, Data helps a young girl on a troubled planet.

== Plot ==
As the Enterprise surveys an area of unexplored planets with unusually short life spans due to severe geological changes, Acting Ensign Wesley Crusher is put in charge of a survey team in order to further his studies toward becoming a Starfleet officer. Wesley selects a team of highly competent science officers; however, as they are much older than he is, he worries that his authority will be challenged. One team member, Davies, rebuffs Wesley's request to run a time-consuming scan, causing Wesley to doubt himself.

Meanwhile, Lt. Commander Data receives a primitive radio signal from a young girl on one of the planets. Data makes contact with the girl, named Sarjenka, and continues to converse regularly with her over the course of the month, keeping the details of his identity secret, as Sarjenka's culture is unaware of life existing outside their planet. When Sarjenka reports that earthquakes are occurring with increasing frequency, Data realizes her planet is beginning to break down, and reports to Captain Picard in the hope that the Enterprise can find a way to reverse the process. Picard sympathizes with Data's case, but sternly orders him to cease communication with Sarjenka to avoid any further violations of the Prime Directive.

Wesley seeks Commander Riker for advice on handling his team. Riker stresses that Starfleet training is about both responsibility and authority, and commends Wesley for his record of responsibility, but urges him to exercise authority with the science team. Wesley returns to the team and requests in a more authoritative manner that Davies perform the planetary scan, and Davies complies without argument.

The scans prove to be key to understanding the planets' geological instability, and Wesley's team proposes a method to correct it. Data receives another signal from Sarjenka, who is now calling for help as volcanic eruptions threaten to wipe out her home. Picard recognizes they cannot ignore her pleas, and orders the Enterprise to Sarjenka's planet. He allows Data to beam down to take the girl to safety; running out of time, he takes her back to the Enterprise instead, much to Picard's dismay. The crew is able to safely restore the planet's geological system, and Picard orders Chief Medical Officer Dr. Pulaski to sedate Sarjenka and erase her memories of Data and the Enterprise. Data returns the sleeping girl to her home, now safe, leaving her with a "singing stone" that Dr. Pulaski had given her while in Sickbay.

== Reception ==
One reviewer, Adam Pranica of the podcast "The Greatest Generation", pointed out that Data's leaving behind of the "singing stone" made no sense, since Data knew that Sarjenka would have no memory of him or of receiving the singing stone, so his motivation would seem to come from sentiment, or as Pranica put it, "...he's doing that for him, and if he doesn't have feelings, why is he doing it?"

In 2011, Tor.com said the writing and acting in this episode were "first-rate" and "superb". Zack Handlen of The A.V. Club in 2010 gave the episode a B− in his review.

== Expanded universe ==
The character Sarjenka introduced in the episode is featured in the Starfleet Corps of Engineers book series, including the novels Progress, Remembrance of Things Past, and What's Past.
