= Jay Mohr =

American actor and comedian (born 1970)

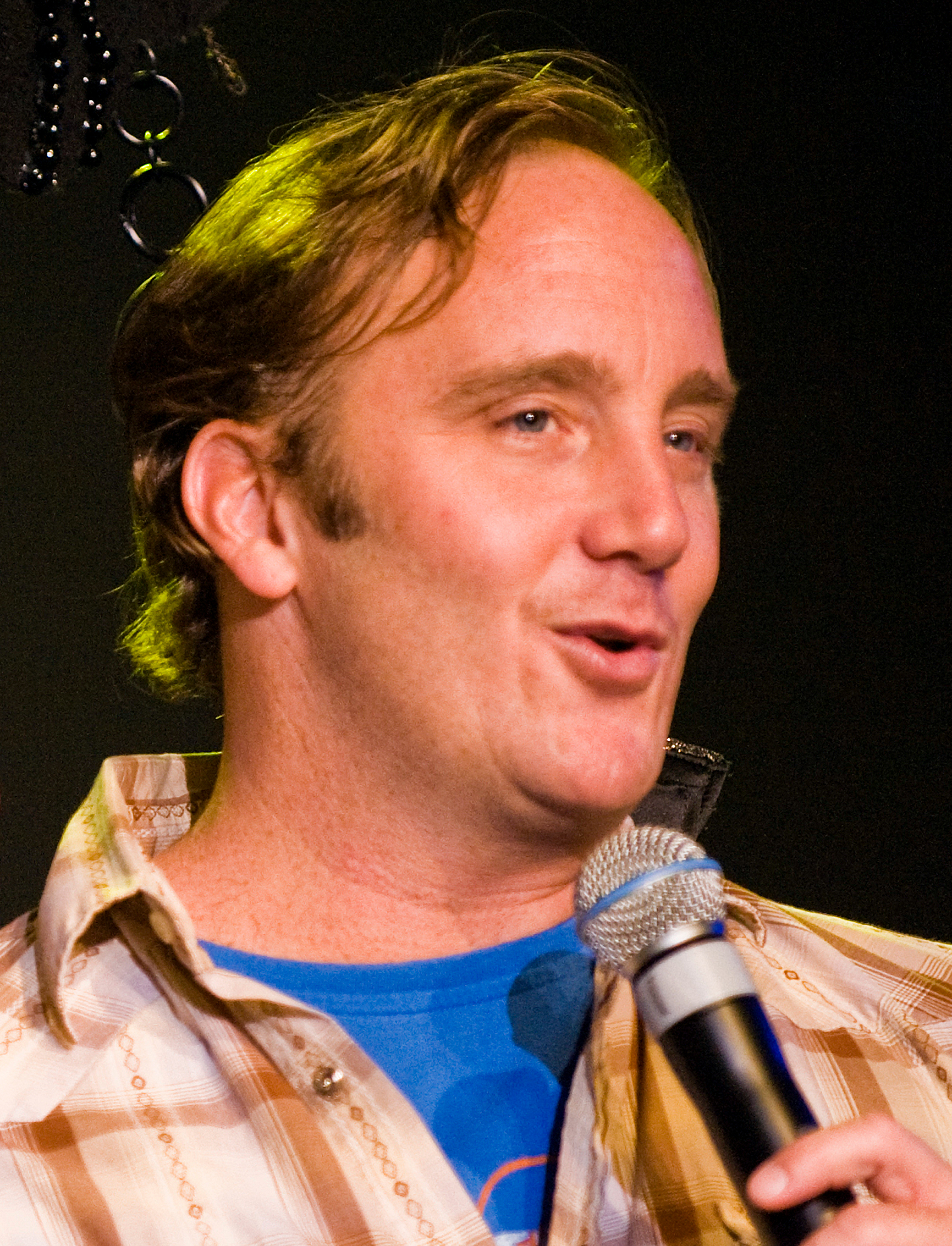
- Mohr in 2009
- Born: Jon Ferguson Mohr; August 23, 1970 (age 56); Verona, New Jersey, U.S.
- Other name: Jon Ferguson Cox Mohr
- Occupations: Actor; stand-up comedian; radio host
- Years active: 1990–present
- Spouses: Nicole Chamberlain (m. 1998; div. 2004); Nikki Cox (m. 2006; div. 2018); Jeanie Buss (m. 2023)
- Children: 2
- Website: jaymohr.com

Jon Ferguson "Jay" Mohr (born August 23, 1970) is an American actor, stand-up comedian, and radio host. He is known for playing film producer Peter Dragon in the television comedy series Action in 1999, Professor Rick Payne in the television series Ghost Whisperer from 2006 to 2008 and the title role in the CBS sitcom Gary Unmarried from 2008 to 2010. He was also a featured cast member on the NBC sketch comedy show Saturday Night Live from 1993 to 1995.

Since making his feature film debut with Jerry Maguire (1996), Mohr has appeared in films such as Picture Perfect (1997), Small Soldiers (1998), 200 Cigarettes (1999), Pay It Forward (2000), Speaking of Sex (2001), Seeing Other People (2004), Even Money (2006), Dumbbells (2014) and Air (2023).

Mohr formerly hosted his own podcast Mohr Stories on the SModcast Network and, since September 2015, hosted Jay Mohr Sports, a daily midday sports radio talk show on Fox Sports Radio. Mohr left Fox Sports Radio in January 2016 to pursue acting ventures. He was nominated for a Primetime Emmy Award as the inaugural host and executive producer of Last Comic Standing (2003–2006).

== Early life ==
Mohr was born on August 23, 1970, in Verona, New Jersey, to Iva Jean (née Ferguson), a nurse, and Jon Wood Mohr, a marketing executive. He has two sisters, Julia and Virginia. He is of Scottish descent. Mohr was raised Presbyterian, but later converted to Catholicism. He graduated from Verona High School in 1988. In high school, he was on the wrestling team and served as its captain during his senior year. Soon after graduating high school, Mohr was part of the cast of Biloxi Blues at the Nutley Little Theater in Nutley, New Jersey.

== Career ==
=== Acting ===
After appearing on MTV's Half Hour Comedy Hour show on April 2, 1991, MTV offered him a job hosting music videos as a VJ, which Mohr turned down. Instead, Mohr ended up hosting the lip-sync contest game show Lip Service on MTV, which earned him a CableACE Award. He then appeared as a featured player for the 1993–94 and 1994–95 seasons of Saturday Night Live. His memoir, Gasping for Airtime: Two Years in the Trenches of Saturday Night Live, details this difficult period of his life, including his struggle with severe panic attacks. He later credited his SNL co-star Sarah Silverman with saving his life by helping him treat the problem. Mohr's account of his voluntary departure from SNL has been widely discounted. He was under a cloud of suspicion due to his admitted plagiarism of jokes during the season and his multi-year contract with NBC did not allow him to unilaterally quit.

Mohr had a recurring role in the first season of The Jeff Foxworthy Show as Jeff Foxworthy's brother, Wayne. Mohr's first major film role was in 1996 when he played the conniving Bob Sugar, a sleazy sports agent in Jerry Maguire, followed in 1997 by a starring role in Picture Perfect with Jennifer Aniston. In 1999, Mohr starred in the television series Action, in which he played sleazy film producer Peter Dragon. He was the voice-over artist for Fox Sports Net's Beyond the Glory. Mohr appeared in additional movies including Suicide Kings, Are We There Yet?, Small Soldiers, Go, Pay It Forward, and The Groomsmen. Mohr was offered a late night talk show job by Michael Eisner, but he declined, instead convincing Eisner to let him host a talk show on ESPN, Mohr Sports, which ran briefly in 2001 before being cancelled. The talk show job Mohr passed was then offered to Jimmy Kimmel and became Jimmy Kimmel Live!

In 2003 and 2004, Mohr created, hosted, and was executive producer of NBC's Last Comic Standing reality television program. The show aired for three seasons, but was cancelled near the end of the third season due to poor ratings, only to be renewed later. Mohr was very vocal toward NBC concerning its cancellation and did not return for the show's fourth season in 2006. Mohr was replaced with new host Anthony Clark, but was credited as a consultant. On the season finale of Last Comic Standing 4, Mohr performed as a guest comedian. His recurring role on the TV series Ghost Whisperer developed into a regular role. He appeared in "My Own Private Practice Guy", a 2003 episode of the sitcom Scrubs, and in three episodes of The West Wing in 2004 in the recurring role of Taylor Reid. Parts of Mohr's stand up was featured in Comedy Central's animated series Shorties Watchin' Shorties. In 2005, he and his Giraffe Productions company inked a deal with Sony Pictures Television.

Mohr starred as newly divorced father Gary Brooks, the title character, for two seasons on the CBS sitcom Gary Unmarried. Paula Marshall played his ex-wife. In January 2010 he took the role as Billy in Clint Eastwood's thriller film Hereafter. He also guest-starred on NBC's Outlaw in 2010.

He has an upcoming starring role alongside Tom Blyth in the comedy Discussion Materials adapted from Bill Keenan's memoir of the same name.

=== Radio ===
Mohr has contributed frequently to The Jim Rome Show and often guest-hosted the program. Mohr finished in 7th place in the 2007 Smack-Off, 6th place in the 2008 Smack-Off, 10th place in the 2009 Smack-Off, 6th place in the 2010 Smack-Off, and 6th place in the 2011 Smack-Off. Mohr is also known to do "drive-by" call-ins to the show, typically to promote one of his stand-up shows or live events.

On January 2, 2013, Mohr replaced Rome on Fox Sports Radio, as he hosts a daily talk show titled Jay Mohr Sports in Rome's longtime 12 to 3 p.m. (ET) timeslot, as Rome moved his show from Premiere Networks (the distributor of Fox Sports Radio) to CBS Sports Radio. The show can be heard on several internet platforms and regional affiliates. On November 3, 2014, Jay Mohr Sports moved to the 3 to 6pm time slot, so Rich Eisen could take over the 12-3pm slot on Fox Sports Radio.

=== Podcast ===
Mohr hosted his own podcast, titled Mohr Stories, on the SModcast Network, On May 4, 2012, Mohr announced his amicable departure from the SModcast network. He has since begun hosting Mohr Stories on his own network, Fake Mustache Studios.

=== Other work ===
In June 2004, Mohr's first book, Gasping for Airtime: Two Years in the Trenches of Saturday Night Live, was published by Hyperion and chronicled his two years working on Saturday Night Live. In May 2010, publisher Simon & Schuster released Mohr's second book, No Wonder My Parents Drank: Tales from a Stand-Up Dad.

Mohr's album Happy. And A Lot was nominated for the Grammy Award for Best Comedy Album at the 58th Annual Grammy Awards. The material was written by Nikki Cox, his wife at the time.

Mohr has hosted the NASCAR Cup Series Awards Ceremony in Las Vegas since 2013.

In 2016, Mohr became the host of the Los Angeles Rams pregame show airing Saturday evenings after college football on KABC-TV. He was replaced as the host in November 2016 with no explanation.

== Personal life ==
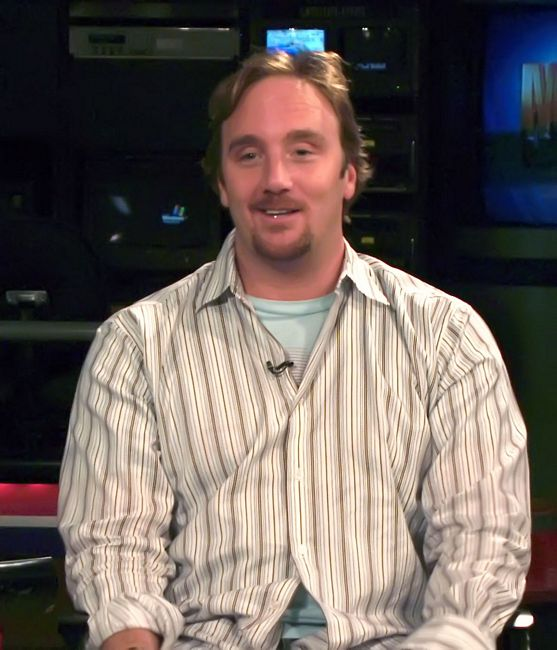
Mohr in 2009

Mohr has a son from his six-year marriage to former model/actress Nicole Chamberlain.

Mohr married actress Nikki Cox on December 29, 2006. Cox wrote one of his stand-up shows. In December 2008, he filed legal papers requesting a legal name change to Jon Ferguson Cox Mohr, adding his wife's surname. Their son was born on May 5, 2011. On May 16, 2017, Mohr confirmed during The Adam Carolla Show that he and Cox were "in the middle" of a divorce. Their divorce was finalized in August 2018. In 2021, Mohr entered a rehabilitation facility to address an addiction to Adderall.

Mohr began dating Los Angeles Lakers owner Jeanie Buss in 2017. The couple became engaged in December 2022 and married on September 3, 2023. Mohr and Buss maintain separate apartments within a building owned by Buss.

== Filmography ==
=== Film ===
Year	Title	Role	Notes
1996	Jerry Maguire	Bob Sugar	
1997	Picture Perfect	Nick	
1997	Suicide Kings	Brett Campbell	
1997	The Brave Little Toaster to the Rescue	Mack McCro (voice)	
1998	Paulie	Benny / Paulie (voice)	
1998	Small Soldiers	Larry Benson	
1998	Mafia!	Tony Cortino	
1998	Playing by Heart	Mark	
1999	200 Cigarettes	Jack	
1999	Go	Zack	Teen Choice Award Nomination
2000	Cherry Falls	Leonard Marliston	
2000	Pay It Forward	Chris Chandler	
2001	Speaking of Sex	Dan	
2001	Black River	Boyd 'Bo' Aikens	
2002	The Adventures of Pluto Nash	Anthony Frankowski / Tony Francis	
2002	Alphine Stars	Ned (voice)	
2002	Simone	Hal Sinclair	
2004	Seeing Other People	Ed	
2005	Are We There Yet?	Marty	
2005	King's Ransom	Corey	
2006	Even Money	Augie	
2006	The Groomsmen	Cousin Mike Sullivan	
2008	Street Kings	Sergeant Mike Clady	
2009	Lonely Street	Bubba Mabry	
2010	Hereafter	Billy	
2013	The Incredible Burt Wonderstone	Rick "The Implausible"	
2014	Dumbbells	Harold	
2015	Road Hard	Jack Taylor	
2018	All About Nina	Mike	
2018	American Nightmares	Raymond	
2019	Hollow Point	"Trigger"	
2023	Air	John Fisher	
2024	Sweet Dreams	Frank	

=== Television ===
Year	Title	Role	Notes
1992	TGIF		Interstitial shorts
1992–1993	Camp Wilder	Dorfman	
1993–1995	Saturday Night Live	Various	
1995	The Barefoot Executive	Matt	
1996	The Jeff Foxworthy Show	Wayne Foxworthy	
1996	Local Heroes	Jake Bartholomew	
1998	From the Earth to the Moon	Brett Hutchins	
1999	Olive, the Other Reindeer	Tim (voice)	
1999–2000	Action	Peter Dragon	Golden Satellite award
2000	The Simpsons	Christopher Walken (voice)	
2000–2005	Family Guy	Various	
2001	Night Visions	Lt. Dale Stillman	
2001	Black River	Boyd "BoÄ" Aikens	
2003	Scrubs	Dr. Peter Fisher	
2003	Fastlane	Roland Hill	
2003	CSI: Miami	Aaron Schecter	
2003–2004	Last Comic Standing	Presenter	Executive Producer; Primetime Emmy nomination
2004	The West Wing	Taylor Reid	3 episodes
2004	The Man Show	AssWatch Salesman	
2005	Las Vegas	Martin Levson	
2006	A Salute to the Troops and USO	Host	
2006	Christmas Do-Over	Kevin	
2006	Community Service	Will Shepard	
2006–2008	Ghost Whisperer	Professor Rick Payne	33 episodes
2008–2010	Gary Unmarried	Gary Brooks	Producer
2009	Monk	Harrison Powell	
2010	Outlaw	Henry Ashford	
2011	Law & Order: Criminal Intent	Nyle Brite	
2011	A Christmas Wedding Tail	Rusty (voice)	
2011	Prime Suspect	A.D.A. Bullock	
2011–2013	Suburgatory	Steven Royce	Recurring role
2012	Applebaum	Al	
2012	Brothers-In-Law		
2012	Jay Mohr: Funny for A Girl	Himself	Standup special
2013	Money Where Your Mouth Is	Host	
2015	Jay Mohr: Happy. And a Lot.	Himself	Standup special
2017–2019	American Housewife	Alan	2 episodes
2018	The Mick	Bert	2 episodes
2020	Jay Mohr: American Treasure	Himself	Standup special
2021	Ghost Adventures	Himself	1 episode
2021	Jay Mohr: Altamont	Himself	Standup special
2022	The Cleaning Lady	Councilman Eric Knight	3 episodes
2023	Winning Time: The Rise of the Lakers Dynasty	Tom Collins	Episode: "BEAT L.A."
2024	Mr. Birchum	Coach Murphy	

=== Video games ===
Year	Title	Role	Notes
2008	Blitz: The League II	Agent	
2008	Saints Row 2	Dane Vogel (voice)	
2009	Leisure Suit Larry: Box Office Bust	Kip Whiteman (voice)	
2015	Saints Row: Gat Out of Hell	Dane Vogel (voice)	
