= Escanaba in Love =

Escanaba in Love is the play written by Jeff Daniels as a prequel to Escanaba in da Moonlight (1995). It had its world premiere in 2006 at the Purple Rose Theatre with former PRTC Apprentices Charlyn Swarthout as Big Betty Baloo and Jake Christensen as Albert Soady, Jr.
