= Purple Rose Theatre Company =

Michigan not-for-profit theater company

Purple Rose Theatre
- PRTC

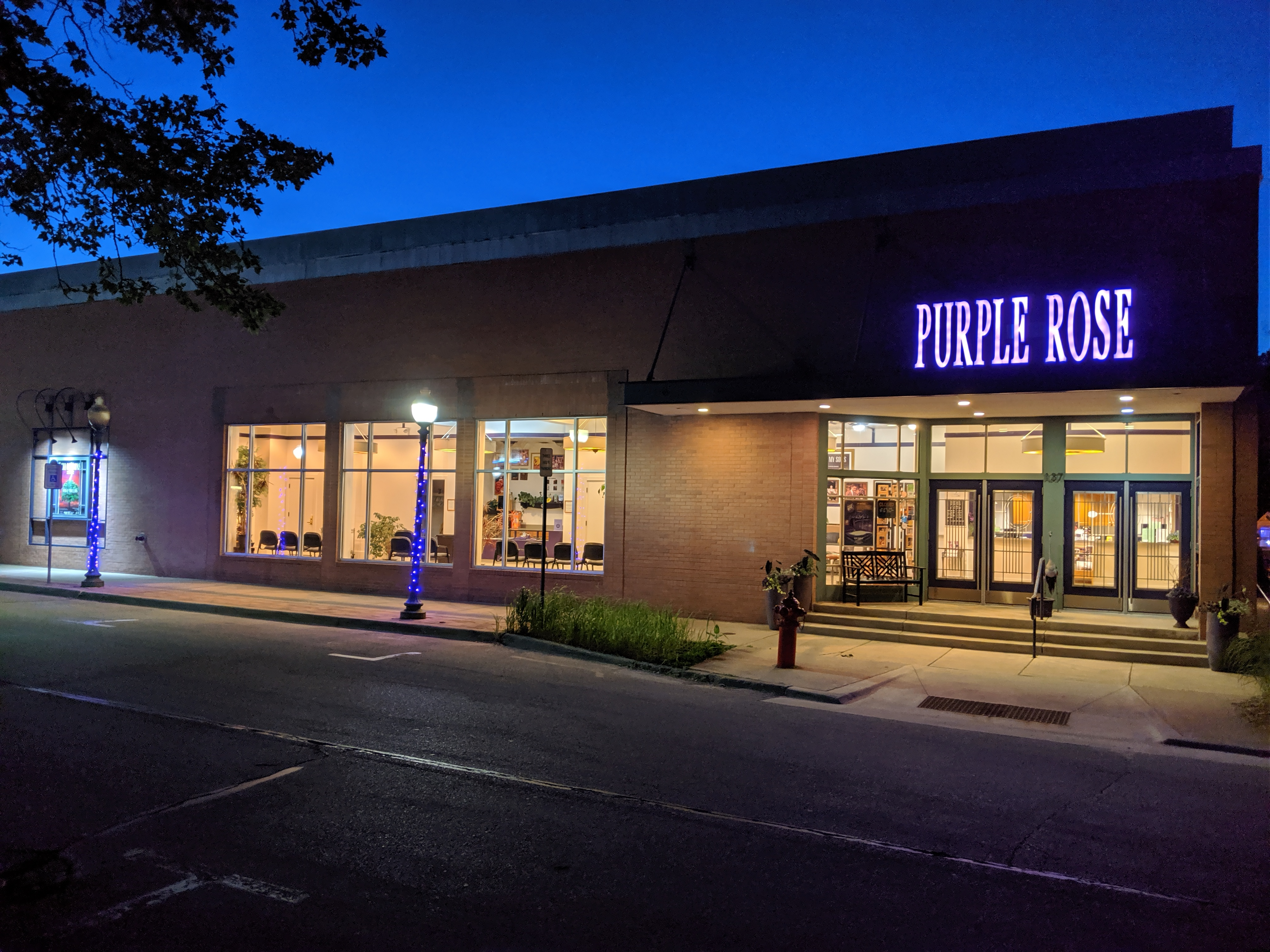
- Interactive map of Purple Rose Theatre
- Location: Chelsea, Michigan
- Capacity: 168 seats

Construction
- Opened: February 7, 1991
- Renovated: August 1999 - January 2001

Website
- www.purplerosetheatre.org

The Purple Rose Theatre Company is a 501(c) non-profit regional theater located in Chelsea, Michigan. It was founded in 1991 by actor and playwright Jeff Daniels. Its name comes from the 1985 film The Purple Rose of Cairo, which starred Daniels and for which he earned his first Golden Globe nomination.

== History ==
In the early 1900s, Jeff Daniels's grandfather owned the building that would one day become the Purple Rose as a car and bus garage. Other business in the same building included a gas station, pizza parlor, and vegetable stand. In 1989, the building was renovated by Daniels to be donated to the Purple Rose.

The building is in the historic district of downtown Chelsea. The lobby features 1930's décor – including marbled glass chandeliers and an art deco box office. In 2018, the lobby (including its bathrooms) was renovated including updated carpeting, new bathrooms, and white walls with purple accents.

The Purple Rose produces four shows a year. In 2017, the Purple Rose produced its 100th production with the revival of Vino Veritas by Michigan playwright David MacGregor.

== Performance space ==
In 1999, a capital campaign worth $2.2 million was launched with the aim to expand the building including the stage, lobby, and administrative spaces. During renovations, the building closed for a year and a half to reopen in January, 2001. The mortgage for the building was paid off in March, 2004.

The renovated stage space is a ¾ thrust with 168 seats with each seat five rows back or less.

In 2017, a two-phase roof renovation project was completed that raised the roof in the backstage area to accommodate more ceiling space above the stage – approximately 1,000 square feet. The project was completed with the help of the Michigan Arts and Culture Council.

== Notable artists ==
Guy Sanville was artistic director for over 20 years. In those years, Sanville directed over 60 productions, and performed in 12 – including The Tropical Pickle, A Stone Carver and The Odd Couple as Oscar. Sanville resigned in 2021.

Bart Bauer, one of the founding members of the theatre, has designed over 35 sets for the Purple Rose including the Sherlock Holmes world premieres and Annapurna.

Television stars and brothers Matt & Brian Letscher both got both their acting and playwriting starts at the Purple Rose.

Carey Crim is a Michigan playwright with 5 world-premieres produced at the Purple Rose. Crim, daughter of Detroit broadcast journalist Mort Crim, started at the Purple Rose as an actor. Most recently, she had her plays Morning After Grace and Never Not Once appear on the Purple Rose stage. Morning After Grace has since had runs at Royal Manitoba Theatre Company, Asolo Rep, and Shakespeare and Co.

David MacGregor is another Michigan playwright with 6 productions at the Purple Rose. MacGregor is in the process of creating a trilogy of plays about Sherlock Holmes. The first play involves Vincent Van Gogh and Oscar Wilde, and the second involves Auguste Escoffier and Prince Albert Edward.

Emergency! TV star Randolph Mantooth has performed in two productions at the Purple Rose: Superior Donuts by Tracy Letts & the world premiere Morning After Grace by Carey Crim.

== Productions ==
World premiere	Midwest premiere	Revival

Season	Fall	Winter	Spring	Summer	Notes
1991–'92		Blush at Nothing by Lisa A. Wing	Shoe Man by Jeff Daniels	Kuru by Josh C. Manheimer	First performance - February 7, 1991
'92-'93	Ties that Bind by Kitty S. Dubin	More Fun than Bowling by Steven Dietz		The Tropical Pickle by Jeff Daniels	No performances April 13-July 6
'92–'93	Possessed: The Dracula Musical by Robert Marasco, music by Jason Darrow & Carter Cathcart	Necessities by Velina Hasu Houston	National Anthems by Dennis McIntyre	Nooner by Kim Carney	
'93–'94	The Vast Difference by Jeff Daniels	Two Sisters by T. E. Williams	Keely & Du by Jane Martin	Stanton's Garage by Joan Ackermann	
'94–'95	Thy Kingdom's Coming by Jeff Daniels	Only Me and You by Kim Carney	Hang the Moon by Suzanne Burr	Weekend Comedy by Jeanne and Sam Bobrick	5th Season
'95–'96	Escanaba in Da Moonlight* by Jeff Daniels	Beast on the Moon by Richard Kalinoski	Spring Comedy Festival: Life, Liberty, and the Pursuit of Lust A collection of short plays by Anthony Caselli, Jeff Daniels, Randall Godwin, Jeffry Herman, Dennis North, Rich Orloff, and Suzi Regan	The Harmony Codes by Michael Grady	*1st in Escanaba Trilogy
'96–'97	Apartment 3A by Jeff Daniels	Labor Day by Kim Carney	Hot l Baltimore by Lanford Wilson	Off the Map by Joan Ackermann	
'97–'98	Escanaba in Da Moonlight by Jeff Daniels	Julie Johnson by Wendy Hammond	Book of Days by Lanford Wilson	Marcus is Walking by Joan Ackermann	
'98–'99	Boom Town by Jeff Daniels	The Hole by Wendy Hammond	The Big Slam by Bill Corbett	Criminal Genius by George F. Walker	Renovations closed the theatre from Aug. 28, 1999 - Jan. 10, 2001
2001		Rain Dance by Lanford Wilson	Orphan Train: An American Melodrama by Dennis E. North	Completing Dahlia by Annie Martin	10th Season
'01–'02	Guys on Ice by Fred Alley (Book and Lyrics) & James Kaplan (Music)	Months on End by Craig Pospisil	Born Yesterday by Garson Kanin	Let it Be by Dennis E. North	
'02–'03	Across the Way by Jeff Daniels	Stand by Toni Press-Coffman	Hope for Corky by Randall Godwin	Blithe Spirit by Noël Coward	
'03–'04	The Good Doctor by Neil Simon	Leaving Iowa by Tim Clue & Spike Manton	The Underpants by Carl Sternheim Adapted by Steve Martin	Duck Hunter Shoots Angel by Mitch Albom	
'04–'05	The Mystery of Irma Vep by Charles Ludlam	Norma and Wanda by Jeff Daniels	Bus Stop by William Inge	And the Winner Is... by Mitch Albom	
'05–'06	The Glass Menagerie by Tennessee Williams	Guest Artist by Jeff Daniels	The Late Great Henry Boyle by David MacGregor	Honus and Me by Steven Dietz	15th Season
'06–'07	Escanaba in Love* by Jeff Daniels	The Subject was Roses by Frank D. Gilroy	When the Lights Come On by Brian Letscher	Sea of Fools by Matt Letscher	*2nd in Escanaba Trilogy
'07–'08	The Poetry of Pizza by Deborah Brevoort	Vino Veritas by David MacGregor	Growing Pretty by Carey Crim	Panhandle Slim & The Oklahoma Kid A play with music by Jeff Daniels	
'08–'09	Apartment 3A by Jeff Daniels	A Streetcar Named Desire by Tennessee Williams	Bleeding Red by Michael Brian Ogden	Wake by Carey Crim	
'09–'10	Escanaba* by Jeff Daniels	Gravity by David MacGregor	Our Town by Thornton Wilder	Boeing-Boeing by Marc Camoletti, adapted by Beverley Cross & Francis Evans	*3rd in Escanaba Trilogy
'10–'11	Best of Friends by Jeff Daniels	Corktown by Michael Brian Ogden	Some Couples May... by Carey Crim	Consider the Oyster by David MacGregor	20th Season
'11–'12	Escanaba in Da Moonlight by Jeff Daniels	A Stone Carver by William Mastrosimone	White Buffalo by Don Zolidis	On Golden Pond by Ernest Thompson	
'12–'13	Superior Donuts by Tracy Letts	The Meaning of Almost Everything by Jeff Daniels	33 Variations by Moisés Kaufman	Miles & Ellie by Don Zolidis	
'13–'14	The Vast Difference by Jeff Daniels	Redwood Curtain by Lanford Wilson	Spring Comedy Festival: Lovers, Liars, and Lunatics A collection of short plays by Carey Crim, Jeff Daniels, Kirsten Knisely, Lauren Knox, David MacGregor, & Craig Pospisil	The Last Romance by Joe DiPietro	
'14–'15	Annapurna by Sharr White	Steel Magnolias by Robert Harling	Talley's Folly by Lanford Wilson	2AZ by Michael Brian Ogden	
'15–'16	Casting Session by Jeff Daniels	The Odd Couple by Neil Simon	Gaps in the Fossil Record by Matt Letscher	Morning's at Seven by Paul Osborn	25th Season
'16–'17	Morning after Grace by Carey Crim	Smart Love by Brian Letscher	Vino Veritas by David MacGregor	Harvey by Mary Chase	
'17–'18	God of Carnage by Yasmina Reza Translated by Christopher Hampton	Flint by Jeff Daniels	Sherlock Holmes and the Adventure of the Elusive Ear* by David MacGregor	Willow Run by Jeff Duncan Music by Brad Phillips, Ben Daniels, Jeff Daniels, and Angie Kane	*1st in Sherlock Trilogy
'18–'19	Diva Royale by Jeff Daniels	Never Not Once by Carey Crim	All My Sons by Arthur Miller	Welcome to Paradise by Julie Marino	
'19–'20	Sherlock Holmes and the Adventure of the Fallen Soufflé* by David MacGregor	Roadsigns** by Jeff Daniels Music by Ben & Jeff Daniels	Closed due to COVID-19	Closed due to COVID-19	*2nd in Sherlock Trilogy **Closed 3 performances early due to COVID-19.

=== Notable productions ===
In 1995, Daniels wrote Escanaba in Da Moonlight about a hunting lodge in the Upper Peninsula (The U.P.) of Michigan. This was the first of three plays Daniels wrote about “Yoopers” (residents of the U.P.), the other two being Escanaba in Love in 2006, and Escanaba in 2009.

In 1997 the Purple Rose produced Hot l Baltimore written by Pulitzer Prize-winning playwright, Lanford Wilson. This production was the first play of Wilson's performed at the Purple Rose, and one of only two plays directed by Jeff Daniels. Wilson eventually ended up writing Book of Days (1998) and Rain Dance (2000) for the theatre, his final two plays before he died in 2011.

In 2017, the Purple Rose produced Willow Run, a play about Rosie the Riveters who worked at the Willow Run bomber plant in Ypsilanti, Michigan. On August 18, nine original Rosies attended the performance.

=== Onstage & Unplugged ===
Starting in 2001, Daniels started performing a holiday concert titled “Onstage & Unplugged” where he sings and plays guitar for a limited engagement of shows as a fundraiser for the theatre. Jeff plays original music and sometimes is joined onstage by close musician friends such as Brad Phillips, the Ben Daniels Band, and Brian Vander Ark.

== Critical reception and awards ==
In 1994, Detroit News named The Purple Rose “Theatre of the Year”.

In 1998, the American Theatre Critics Association awarded the “Best New Play” award to Book of Days by Lanford Wilson.

The Purple Rose has won three Edgerton Foundation New Play awards – for White Buffalo (2011), Gaps in the Fossil Record (2015), and Willow Run (2017). The award allows theaters to pay artists for a week of rehearsal and workshops.

In February 2013, the Chelsea Area Chamber of Commerce awarded the Purple Rose with the Large Business Leadership Award.

In September 2016, during their 25th anniversary fundraiser, The Senior Senator from Michigan, Debbie Stabenow, presented a commendation to the Purple Rose, applauding its cultural and economic impact in South East Michigan.

=== Wilde Awards ===
Since 2002, the Wilde Awards have recognized Michigan's professional theatre community. The Purple Rose has won 24 of these Wilde Awards, out of a total of 129 nominations.

Purple Rose Wilde Award Nominations & Wins

Year	Category	Nominee	Play	Result
2003	Favorite Male Performer in a Local Professional Production – COMEDY	Ryan Carlson	Hope for Corky	Nominated
2003	Favorite Female Performer in a Local Professional Production – DRAMA	Sandra Birch	Stand	Nominated
2004	Critic's Choice Award – “A” Season of Excellence	Purple Rose Theatre	n/a	Won
2004	Favorite Local Professional Production – COMEDY	Guy Sanville & Anthony Caselli, directors	Blythe Spirit	Nominated
2004	Favorite Local Professional Production – COMEDY	Guy Sanville, director	The Good Doctor	Nominated
2004	Favorite Male Performer in a Local Professional Production – COMEDY	John Lepard	Leaving Iowa	Nominated
2004	Favorite Male Performer in a Local Professional Production – COMEDY / MUSICAL	Malcolm Tulip	Blithe Spirit	Nominated
2004	Favorite Supporting Female Performer in a Local Professional Production, COMEDY / MUSICAL	Sandra Birch	Blithe Spirit	Nominated
2004	Favorite Supporting Female Performer in a Local Professional Production, COMEDY / MUSICAL	Sarab Kamoo	The Underpants	Nominated
2004	Favorite Supporting Male Performer in a Local Professional Production, COMEDY / MUSICAL	Randall Godwin	The Underpants	Nominated
2004	Favorite Supporting Male Performer in a Local Professional Production, COMEDY / MUSICAL	Jim Porterfeld	Leaving Iowa	Nominated
2005	Best Supporting Male Performer in a Local Professional Production– COMEDY	John Lepard	Bus Stop	Won
2005	Favorite Local Professional Production – COMEDY	Anthony Caselli, director	The Mystery of Irma Vep	Nominated
2005	Favorite Local Professional Production – COMEDY	Guy Sanville, director	Norma & Wanda	Nominated
2005	Best Supporting Female Performer in a Local Professional Production COMEDY	Terry Heck	Norma & Wanda	Nominated
2005	Best Supporting Male Performer in a Local Professional Production – COMEDY	Grant R. Krause	Norma & Wanda	Nominated
2005	Best Supporting Male Performer in a Local Professional Production – COMEDY	Jim Porterfield	Norma & Wanda	Nominated
2005	Best Duo in a Local Professional Production	Sandra Birch & Michelle Mountain	Norma & Wanda	Nominated
2005	Best Duo in a Local Professional Production	John Lepard & John Seibert	The Mystery of Irma Vep	Nominated
2006	Critic's Choice Award: Best Duo in a Local Professional Production	Grant R. Krause & Patrick Michael Kenney	Guest Artist	Won
2006	Favorite Local Professional Production – COMEDY	Guy Sanville, director	The Late Great Henry Boyle	Nominated
2006	Best Lead Actor – COMEDY	Grant R. Krause	And The Winner Is	Nominated
2006	Best Lead Actor – COMEDY	John Lepard	The Late Great Henry Boyle	Nominated
2006	Best Supporting Actress – COMEDY	Sarab Kamoo	And The Winner Is	Nominated
2006	Best Supporting Actor – COMEDY	Paul Hopper	And The Winner Is	Nominated
2006	Favorite Local Professional Production – DRAMA	Guy Sanville, director	Guest Artist	Nominated
2006	Best Lead Actress – DRAMA	Michelle Mountain	The Glass Menagerie	Nominated
2006	Best Supporting Actress – DRAMA	Molly Thomas	The Glass Menagerie	Nominated
2006	Best Supporting Actor – DRAMA	Ryan Carlson	The Glass Menagerie	Nominated
2006	Best Supporting Actor – DRAMA	Randall Godwin	Guest Artist	Nominated
2007	Best Local Professional COMEDY	Guy Sanville, director	Escanaba in Love	Won
2007	Best Actor – COMEDY	Nicaolas J. Smith	Honus and Me	Won
2007	Best Duo or Trio in a Local Professional Production	Will David Young, Paul Hopper & Wayne David Parker	Escanaba in Love	Won
2007	Best Local Professional COMEDY	Guy Sanville, director	Honus and Me	Nominated
2007	Best Local Professional DRAMA	Quintessa Gallinat, director	The Subject Was Roses	Nominated
2007	Best Supporting Actor – COMEDY or DRAMA	Randall Godwin	Honus and Me	Nominated
2007	Best Duo or Trio in a Local Professional Production	Grant R. Krause & Patrick Michael Kenney	The Subject Was Roses	Nominated
2007	Best Set Design	Bartley H. Bauer	The Subject Was Roses	Nominated
2007	Best Set Design	Daniel C. Walker	Escanaba in Love	Nominated
2008	Best Actor – COMEDY	Guy Sanville	Sea of Fools	Won
2008	Best Actress – COMEDY	Sandra Birch	Sea of Fools	Won
2008	Best Local Professional COMEDY	Matt Letscher, director	Sea of Fools	Nominated
2008	Best Actor – COMEDY	Phil Powers	Vino Veritas	Nominated
2008	Best Supporting Actor	Clyde Brown	Sea of Fools	Nominated
2008	Best Technical Design (set)	Vincent Mountain	Sea of Fools	Nominated
2008	Best Technical Design (set)	Daniel C. Walker	Vino Veritas	Nominated
2009	Best New Script	Jeff Daniels	Panhandle Slim & The Oklahoma Kid	Won
2009	Best Comedy	Guy Sanville, director	Panhandle Slim & The Oklahoma Kid	Nominated
2009	Best New Script	Michael Brian Ogden	Bleeding Red	Nominated
2009	Best Teamwork by a Duo or Trio	John Seibert & Tom Whalen	Panhandle Slim & The Oklahoma Kid	Nominated
2009	Best Design: Set	Dennis G. Crawley	Panhandle Slim & The Oklahoma Kid	Nominated
2010	Critics' Choice Award: Design and Technical Excellence Award	Purple Rose Theatre	Gravity	Won
2010	Best Actor – Drama	Alex Leydenfrost	Gravity	Nominated
2010	Best Actor – Drama	Will David Young	Our Town	Nominated
2010	Best Support – Comedy	Stacie Hadgikosti	Wake	Nominated
2010	Best Support – Drama	Will David Young	Gravity	Nominated
2010	Best Design – Lights	Daniel C. Walker	Our Town	Nominated
2010	Best Design – Sets	Dennis G. Crawley	Escanaba	Nominated
2010	Best New Script	David MacGregor	Gravity	Nominated
2010	Best Production of a New Script	Guy Sanville, director	Escanaba	Nominated
2010	Best Production of a New Script	Guy Sanville, director	Gravity	Nominated
2011	Best Production of a New Script	Guy Sanville, director	Corktown	Won
2011	Best Comedy	Nathan Mitchell, director	Boeing-Boeing	Nominated
2011	Best Production of a New Script	Guy Sanville, director	Best of Friends	Nominated
2011	Best Performance, Actor – Comedy	Jim Porterfield	Some Couples May...	Nominated
2011	Best Teamwork	Matthew David & Michael Brian Ogden	Corktown	Nominated
2011	Best New Script	Michael Brian Ogden	Corktown	Nominated
2012	Best Drama	Rhiannon Ragland, director	A Stone Carver	Won
2012	Best Performance, Actor – Drama	Guy Sanville	A Stone Carver	Won
2012	Best Comedy	Guy Sanville, director	Escanaba in da Moonlight	Nominated
2012	Best Design – Sets	Daniel C. Walker	A Stone Carver	Nominated
2012	Best Design – Lights	Dana White	A Stone Carver	Nominated
2012	Best Design – Sound	Quintessa Gallinat	Escanaba in da Moonlight	Nominated
2013	Critic's Choice Award: Best Director	Guy Sanville	Superior Donuts	Won
2013	Best Performance, Actress – Drama	Michelle Mountain	33 Variations	Nominated
2013	Best Choreography	Rhiannon Ragland	The Meaning of Almost Everything	Nominated
2013	Best Design - Sound or Video	Quintessa Gallinat	The Meaning of Almost Everything	Nominated
2013	Best New Script	Jeff Daniels	The Meaning of Almost Everything	Nominated
2014	Wilde-r Award: The Best Worst First	Rusty Mewha & Rhiannon Ragland	Miles & Ellie	Won
2014	Best Performance, Actor, Comedy	Will David Young	The Last Romance	Nominated
2014	Best Performance, Actress, Comedy	Priscilla Lindsay	The Last Romance	Nominated
2015	Best Design – Props	Danna Segrest	Annapurna	Won
2015	Best Design – Sets	Bartley H. Bauer	Annapurna	Won
2015	Best Drama	Guy Sanville, director	Annapurna	Won
2015	Best Performance, Actress-Drama	Michelle Mountain	Annapurna	Nominated
2015	Best Performance, Actor-Drama	Richard McWilliams	Annapurna	Nominated
2015	Best Design- Costumes	Christianne Myers	Steel Magnolias	Nominated
2016	Best Design Sound/Video	Tom Whalen & Noelle Stollmack	2AZ	Won
2016	Best Play	Guy Sanville, director	2AZ	Nominated
2016	Best Performance Rising Star	Nina White	2AZ	Nominated
2016	Best Performance, Lead Actor	David Montee	The Odd Couple	Nominated
2016	Best Performance, Supporting Actress	Rhiannon Ragland	2AZ	Nominated
2016	Best Set Design	Bartley H. Bauer	The Odd Couple	Nominated
2016	Best Set Design	Gary Ciarkowski	2AZ	Nominated
2016	Best New Script	Michael Brian Ogden	2AZ	Nominated
2017	Best Play	Michelle Mountain, director	Morning's at Seven	Nominated
2017	Best Performance, Lead Actor – Play	Randolph Mantooth	Morning After Grace	Nominated
2017	Best Performance, Supporting Actor – Play	Rusty Mewha	Morning's at Seven	Nominated
2017	Best Performance, Supporting Actress – Play	Susan Craves	Morning's at Seven	Nominated
2017	Best Design, Lights	Reid G. Johnson	Morning's at Seven	Nominated
2017	Best New Script	Carey Crim	Morning After Grace	Nominated
2018	The Publisher's Award	Guy Sanville, director; Jeff Daniels, playwright	Flint	Won
2018	Best Design – Props	Danna Segrest	Sherlock Holmes and The Adventure of the Elusive Ear	Won
2018	Best Design – Sets	Bartley H. Bauer	Sherlock Holmes and The Adventure of The Elusive Ear	Won
2018	Best Play	Guy Sanville, director	Harvey	Nominated
2018	Best Original Production or One-Act	Guy Sanville, director	Flint	Nominated
2018	Best Performance, Lead Actor – Play	Richard McWilliams	Harvey	Nominated
2018	Best Performance, Lead Actress – Play	Sarab Kamoo	Sherlock Holmes and The Adventure of The Elusive Ear	Nominated
2018	Best Performance, Supporting Actor – Play	David Bendena	Flint	Nominated
2018	Best Performance, Supporting Actor – Play	Rusty Mehwa	Sherlock Holmes and The Adventure of The Elusive Ear	Nominated
2018	Best Performance, Supporting Actress – Play	Michelle Mountain	Harvey	Nominated
2018	Best Teamwork	Michelle Mountain, Paul Stroili, Kate Thomsen, & Rusty Mewha	God of Carnage	Nominated
2018	Best New Script	David MacGregor	Sherlock Holmes and The Adventure of the Elusive Ear	Nominated
2019	Best Lead Actress	Michelle Mountain	All My Sons	Won
2019	Best Music Direction	Brad Phillips	Willow Run	Won
2019	Best New Script	Carey Crim	Never Not Once	Nominated
2019	Best New Script	Jeffery Duncan	Willow Run	Nominated
2019	Best Supporting Actress	K. Edmonds	Willow Run	Nominated
2019	Best Design-Sets	Sarah Pearline	Willow Run	Nominated
2019	Best Musical	Guy Sanville, director	Willow Run	Nominated
2019	Best Play-Drama	Guy Sanville, director	All My Sons	Nominated
2019	Best Original Production	Guy Sanville, director	Willow Run	Nominated
2019	Best Original Production	Guy Sanville, director	Never Not Once	Nominated

== Apprenticeship program ==
The Purple Rose formerly offered a year-long apprenticeship program for young artists entering a career in theatre. Apprentices were paid a modest stipend, gaining experience in lighting, sound, stage management, design, set construction, and administrative/box office work. The seven apprentices also maintained and cleaned the theatre's facilities. The program was inspired by Daniels's experience as an apprentice with the Circle Repertory Company in New York City.

The Purple Rose discontinued the apprentice program in 2021, following longstanding claims of toxic and abusive treatment of apprentices by staff, including artistic director Guy Sanville. The claims resulted in an investigation by the Actors' Equity Association, the union representing Purple Rose staff, which dismissed all but one of the complaints due to the length of time that had elapsed when the complaints were brought. The Purple Rose reached a confidential settlement with a group of former apprentices in late 2020 regarding wage and hour violations, and committed to hire an independent human resources firm. Sanville resigned his Actors' Equity Association membership and his position as artistic director in late 2021.

== Films ==
In 2001, Purple Rose Films produced Escanaba in da Moonlight, based on the play of the same name written by Jeff Daniels. The film includes nine actors associated with the Purple Rose Theatre, including Jim Porterfield and Wayne David “Daba” Parker, who played Alphonse & Da Jimmer respectively in the play and the film.

In 2002, Purple Rose Films produced an original movie entitled Super Sucker, a story about vacuum cleaner salesmen. The film was shot entirely in Jackson, Michigan. Eleven actors in the film were associated with the Purple Rose Theatre, including Jeff Daniels, Matt Letscher, Guy Sanville, and Michelle Mountain.

In 2013, Blue Frog Productions produced Vino Veritas, based on the play of the same name written by David MacGregor. The film was shot in Lincoln, Nebraska.

In 2017, Mirrorcore Productions produced Wake, based on the play of the same name written by Carey Crim. The film was shot in California.

In 2017, Grand River Productions produced Guest Artist, based on the play of the same name written by Jeff Daniels. The film is almost entirely cast with actors from the Purple Rose including Jeff Daniels, Richard McWilliams (Harvey as Elwood P. Dowd & All My Sons as Joe Keller) and Thomas Macias, who started at the Purple Rose as an apprentice in 2013. The film was directed by Timothy Busfield and was shot on location in New York City, New York and Chelsea, Michigan.

In 2019, Doorstop Productions produced a short film called Just Desserts, based on the short play of the same name written by David MacGregor. The film was shot in Orange, New Jersey.

== Television ==
In October 2015, Purple Rose: 25 Years premiered on Detroit Public Television. This documentary, produced by 2188, features the story of the Purple Rose with stories and interviews from some of the artists associated with the theatre.

In October 2017, the Purple Rose was featured along with Cornelia Sampson and the Guadalupe Arts and Culture Center in an episode of Detroit Performs.

== See also ==
- Jeff Daniels – Founder
- Lanford Wilson – Playwright – mentor to Jeff Daniels
