= John John =

John John may refer to:

- John-John Dohmen (born 1988), Belgian field hockey player
- John John Florence (born 1992), American surfer
- John John Jesse (born 1969), American illustrative painter
- John John Mnyika, Tanzanian politician
- John John Molina (born 1965), Puerto Rican boxer
- John F. Kennedy Jr. (1960–1999), nicknamed John-John

== See also ==
- John John in the Sky, 2001 American-Japanese film
- "John John (Let's Hope for Peace)", a song by the Plastic Ono Band
- Jhon Jhon (born 2002), Brazilian football player
