= Tim Clue =

American comedian

- Born: Tim Clue; 1962 (age 63–64); Rochelle, Illinois, United States
- Education: Bradley University; Eastern Michigan University
- Occupations: Comedian; Director; Motivational speaker; Playwright
- Years active: 1991-present
- Notable work: Leaving Iowa; Other Definitions of Confinement; Tiny Pig
- Website: timclue.com

Tim Clue (born 1962) is an American motivational speaker, comedian, director, and playwright, based in Chicago, Illinois. He is the co-author of the stage comedy Leaving Iowa and the founder of MindSlap Meetings and FunnyPolling, online engagement tools developed for remote and hybrid work team.

For a brief period, he also hosted WGN Radio comedy show and New Year's Eve radio show with Steve Cochran.

== Early life and education ==
Clue was born in 1962 and grew up in Rochelle, Illinois, a small town outside Chicago. He attended Bradley University, where he earned a bachelor's degree in communications in 1985. At Bradley, he met Marco Benassi, and the two joined the university's speech team, performing adapted poetry and short story at tournaments. Their success on the team earned them full scholarships. Clue later coached college speech teams and later taught speech at the College of DuPage.

In 2005, he received a master's degree in speech communication and rhetoric from Eastern Michigan University. Later, he also received training at The Second City in Chicago.

== Career ==
Clue began his career writing stand-up comedy. In 1992, he founded Short Story Theatre, a company that combined short fiction with documentary footage. In 1994, its inaugural production, Greek Stories, was premiered, which used short stories by Harry Mark Petrakis. A second work, Other Definitions of Confinement, premiered at the National Jewish Theatre in 1993, and in 1999 Clue wrote and directed the Chicago-based sitcom pilot Tiny Pig.

Later, Clue also directed Bark Like a Comic along with A.J. Lentini, Bill Gorgo and Jimmy Rhodes. In 1995, he and Benassi adapted The Jewish Melody. He returned to collaborate with Benassi in 1997 on Greek Streets.

In 2004, Clue co-authored Leaving Iowa with Spike Manton. The play received its world premiere at Jeff Daniels' Purple Rose Theatre Company in Chelsea, Michigan, on January 22, 2004, where it was nominated for Best New Play of 2004 by the Detroit Free Press. The play, a road-trip comedy about a middle-aged writer searching for a place to scatter his late father's ashes, transferred to Chicago's Royal George Theatre for a year-long run beginning in 2006 and has since been licensed for productions throughout the United States and Canada.

Clue is co-founder of Chicago Sitcom, a production company that develops works for stage, film, and television. Previously, he has worked as the coach of the College of DuPage (COD) national championship speech team.

== Work ==
=== Books ===
- Manton, Spike; Clue, Tim (2008). Leaving Iowa: The Comedy about Family Vacations

=== Plays ===
- Greek Stories (1994)
- Bark Like a Comic (1994)
- The Jewish Melody (1995)
- Other Definitions of Confinement (1995)
- ''Greek Streets (1997)
- Tiny Pig (1999)
- Leaving Iowa (2004)
