= Matt Letscher =

American actor and playwright

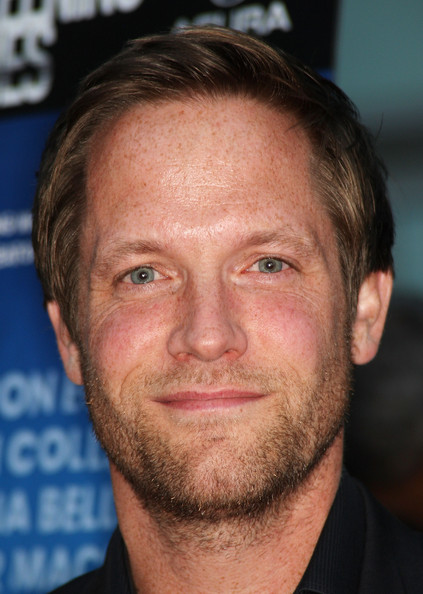
- Letscher in 2007
- Born: June 26, 1970 (age 56); Grosse Pointe, Michigan
- Education: University of Michigan
- Occupations: Actor; playwright; director
- Years active: 1992–present
- Spouse: Jennifer Letscher
- Children: 2

Matt Letscher is an American actor, director, and playwright, known for his roles as Captain Harrison Love in The Mask of Zorro and Colonel Adelbert Ames in Gods and Generals. He co-starred in 13 Hours: The Secret Soldiers of Benghazi. He was also Eobard Thawne / Reverse-Flash in The Flash and Legends of Tomorrow.

== Early life and education ==
Letscher was born on June 26, 1970, in Grosse Pointe, Michigan. He attended college at the University of Michigan in Ann Arbor, Michigan, where he was a member of the Sigma Nu fraternity and a drama major.

== Career ==
=== Acting ===
Letscher got his first professional acting job with a role in The Tropic Pickle, during the second season of Jeff Daniels' Purple Rose Theatre Company in Chelsea, Michigan. Letscher impressed Daniels enough that the veteran arranged a meeting for Letscher with Ron Maxwell, the director of Gettysburg. After appearing in a small role, Letscher took advice from Daniels and moved to Los Angeles. He quickly found work in guest roles on television.

In 1995, Letscher was cast as the naive television writer in the Nancy Travis sitcom Almost Perfect, which lasted for a season and a half. He went on to appear as series regular in Living in Captivity in 1998. The same year, he appeared in the film The Mask of Zorro as the villain Captain Harrison Love. He appeared in the miniseries Jackie, Ethel, Joan: Women of Camelot and in the television films King of Texas, The Beach Boys: An American Family, When Billie Beat Bobby, and Stolen Innocence. He also reunited with Daniels in Gods and Generals (the prequel of Gettysburg) and Daniels' directorial effort Super Sucker. Letscher also returned to The Purple Rose Theatre in the world premiere of Landford Wilson's play Rain Dance.

In 2002, the comedy pilot Good Morning, Miami was picked up by NBC as part of Must See TV Thursday comedy block, but Burke Moses was replaced by Letscher and a second pilot had to be filmed. The romantic comedy sitcom featured Letscher as a smarmy former network anchor who was the primary romantic rival to main character Jake Silver (Mark Feuerstein) for the affection of Dylan (Ashley Williams). Despite the series receiving negative reviews, Letscher and Constance Zimmer were standouts in the series and eventually paired up as a combative couple. But the show was canceled midway though its second season due to low ratings.

His performance in Good Morning, Miami led to him being cast in the lead in the film Straight-Jacket, opposite Carrie Preston, about a gay Hollywood actor forced to marry a beard in the 1950s. His flair for classical farce also led to him being cast in the leading role of Capt. Jack Absolute in the Lincoln Center theater production of Richard Brinsley Sheridan's The Rivals. Letscher was praised for his spirited performance and his costar Robert Easton referred to Letscher as "a perfect classical actor."

Letscher was in the cast of Joey, and had a recurring role on The New Adventures of Old Christine and numerous guest starring roles. After appearing as a kind neighbor in Alan Ball's Towelhead, Letscher was cast in Eli Stone, as Nathan Stone, the prophet's kind-hearted older brother. Despite low ratings, the dramedy series had loyal fans and critical acclaim, earning it a second season which included a larger role for Letscher. His work on Greg Berlanti's Eli Stone lead to his arc on Berlanti's Brothers & Sisters as a love interest for the married Kitty Walker.

In 2012, Letscher starred in the series Bent and Scandal, and was cast in the series The Carrie Diaries as Tom Bradshaw, Carrie Bradshaw's widowed father. The show ran for two seasons from 2013 until 2014. He appeared in the 2013 films, Atom Egoyan's Devil's Knot (about The West Memphis Three) and Spike Jonze's comedy Her, opposite Amy Adams. Letscher portrayed Eobard Thawne / Reverse-Flash, initially in a recurring role on The Flash and later as a regular in season two of Legends of Tomorrow, and reprised the role in two episodes of its seventh season.

=== Writing ===
In June 2007, Jeff Daniels' Purple Rose Theatre Company in Chelsea, Michigan, staged the world premiere of Letscher's original play Sea of Fools, a farce set in Joseph McCarthy-era Hollywood. Film director Elia Kazan is a character in the play. Daniels initially planned to direct the play but pulled out, allowing Letscher to also direct the play.

In 2009, his play Gaps in the Fossil Record was staged at the Pacific Resident Theater, then had its world premiere production at the Purple Rose Theatre in 2016.

In 2010, he co-wrote (with Nipper Knapp and Andrew Newberg) and starred in the comedy pilot Gentrification, which won best writing at the Comedy Central New York Television Festival.

== Personal life ==
Letscher has a wife, Jennifer, and two children.

== Filmography ==
=== Film ===
Year	Film	Role	Notes
1993	Gettysburg	Young 2nd Maine man	
1995	Not This Part of the World	Tom	
1995	Prehysteria! 3	Needlemeyer	Direct to video
1996	Power 98	Eddie	Voice
1997	Lovelife	Danny	
1998	The Mask of Zorro	Captain Harrison Love	Nominated — Blockbuster Entertainment Award for Best Villain
2000	John John in the Sky	John Clairborne	
2002	Super Sucker	Howard Butterworth	
2003	Gods and Generals	Colonel Adelbert Ames	
2003	Identity	Greg	
2004	Straight-Jacket	Guy Stone	
2005	Madison	Owen	
2005	Heart of the Beholder	Mike Howard	
2007	Towelhead	Gil Hines	
2010	Radio Free Albemuth	Mr. Brady	
2013	Devil's Knot	Paul Ford	
2013	Her	Charles	
2014	Teacher of the Year	Mitch Carter	
2015	Day Out of Days	Jason	
2016	13 Hours: The Secret Soldiers of Benghazi	Ambassador Chris Stevens	
2019	Countdown	Charlie Harris	

=== Television ===
Year	Title	Role	Notes
1993	Saved by the Bell: The College Years	Rick	Episode: "Rush Week"
1994	Silk Stalkings	Harley Eastlake	Episode: "Head 'N' Tail"
1994	Dr. Quinn, Medicine Woman	Tom Jennings	Episode: "Life and Death"
1994	The Larry Sanders Show	Daniel Palmer	Episode: "The Fourteenth Floor"
1994	Ellen	Steve Morgan	Episode: "The Toast"
1994	Long Shadows	Nathan	Television film
1995	Vanishing Son	N/A	Episode: "Holy Ghosts"
1995	The Watcher	N/A	Episode: "Heartburned"
1995	Silk Stalkings	Jeff Chadwick	Episode: "I Know What Scares You"
1995	Stolen Innocence	Eddie	Television film
1995–1997	Almost Perfect	Rob Paley	Main role
1998	Living in Captivity	Will Marek	Main role
1999	NYPD Blue	Witness	Episode: "What's Up, Chuck?"
1999	Love, American Style	Ned	Episode: "Love in the Old South"
2000	The Beach Boys: An American Family	Mike Love	Television film
2001	When Billie Beat Bobby	Larry King	Television film
2001	Jackie, Ethel, Joan: The Women of Camelot	Ted Kennedy	Miniseries
2002	Providence	Kevin Norris	3 episodes
2002	King of Texas	Emmett Westover	Television film
2002–2003	Good Morning, Miami	Gavin Stone	Main role
2004–2005	Joey	Eric Garrett	Recurring role
2005	Criminal Minds	Vincent Shyer	Episode: "Broken Mirror"
2006–2007	The New Adventures of Old Christine	Burton Schaefer	Recurring role
2006	The West Wing	Peter Blake	Episode: "Welcome to Wherever You Are"
2006	Saved	Robbie Cole	Episode: "Family"
2006	Justice	Will Bechtel	Episode: "Shark Week"
2007	Boston Legal	ADA Adam Mersel	Episode: "Angel of Death"
2007	CSI: Miami	Dr. Mike Lasker	Episode: "Broken Home"
2008–2009	Eli Stone	Nathan Stone	Main role
2009–2010	Brothers & Sisters	Alec Tyler	Recurring role
2009	Entourage	Dan Coakley	3 episodes
2009	Medium	Dr. Erik Westphal	Episode: "You Give Me Fever"
2010	Drop Dead Diva	A.J. Fowler	Episode: "Good Grief"
2010	Amish Grace	Gideon Graber	Television film
2011	The Good Wife	Adam Boras	Episode: "Two Courts"
2011	Pound Puppies	Hunky man, ticket seller, Ref	Voice; episode: "Quintuplets"
2012	Bent	Ben	Recurring role
2012–2013	Scandal	Billy Chambers	Recurring role
2013–2014	The Carrie Diaries	Tom Bradshaw	Main role
2014	Boardwalk Empire	Joseph P. Kennedy	4 episodes
2014–2015	Castle	Henry Jenkins	3 episodes
2014	CSI: Crime Scene Investigation	Major Bernard Mills	Episode: "Angle of Attack"
2015	The Exes	Charles Hayward	2 episodes
2015–2016, 2022–2023	The Flash	Eobard Thawne / Reverse-Flash	Recurring role; 9 episodes
2016–2017, 2022	Legends of Tomorrow	Eobard Thawne / Reverse-Flash	Main role (season 2), guest (season 7); 14 episodes
2017	Hell's Kitchen	Himself	Guest diner; Episode: "Tequila Shots?"
2018	Will & Grace	James Wise	3 episodes
2018–2021	Narcos: Mexico	Jaime Kuykendall	Recurring role
2020	Angel of Darkness	William Randolph Hearst	Recurring role
2021	The Rookie	Cooper Sanford	Episode: "Hit and Run"
2025-present	Georgie & Mandy's First Marriage	Fred Fagenbacher	Recurring role
2025	Suits LA	Ted's father	Recurring role

=== Web series ===
Year	Title	Role	Notes
2009	The Hustler	Dad	Episode: "Piñata Hustler"
2014–2016	One & Done	Matthew	Main role; Also co-creator, writer, director, and producer

=== Video games ===
Year	Title	Role	Note
2010	BioShock 2	Additional voices	Minerva's Den DLC

== Theater ==
=== Actor ===
Year	Play	Role	Theater/Company
1992	The Tropical Pickle	Birmingham	Purple Rose Theatre (regional)
1993	The Seagull		Fountain Theater (regional)
1995	The Sisters	David Turzin	Fountain Theater (regional)
1997–1998	Proposals	Ray	Broadhurst Theater (Broadway)
1999	Absolution	David	Los Angeles Court Theater (regional)
2000	Love's Labour's Lost	Berowne	Old Globe Theater (regional)
2000	Tonight at 8.30	Toby Cartwright	Pacific Resident Theater (regional)
2001	Rain Dance	Hank	Purple Rose Theatre (regional)
2002	On Approval	George	Pacific Resident Theatre (regional)
2004–2005	The Rivals	Captain Jack Absolute	Lincoln Center (Broadway)
2006	Double Double	Duncan	Williamson Theater Festival (regional)
2006	Ridiculous Fraud	Kap	South Coast Repertory (regional)
2007	Anatol	Anatol	Pacific Resident Theatre (regional), Los Angeles Drama Desk Award - Lead Performance
2008	What We Have	Jonas	South Coast Repertory (regional)
2010	In a Garden	Hacket	South Coast Repertory (regional)
2010	The Language Archive	George	Roundabout Theater Company (Off-Broadway)

=== Playwright ===
Year	Play	Theater/Company
2007	Sea of Fools	Purple Rose Theatre (regional)
2009	Gaps in the Fossil Record	Pacific Resident Theatre (regional)
2016	Gaps in the Fossil Record	Purple Rose Theatre (regional)
