= Harve Presnell =

American actor and singer (1933–2009)

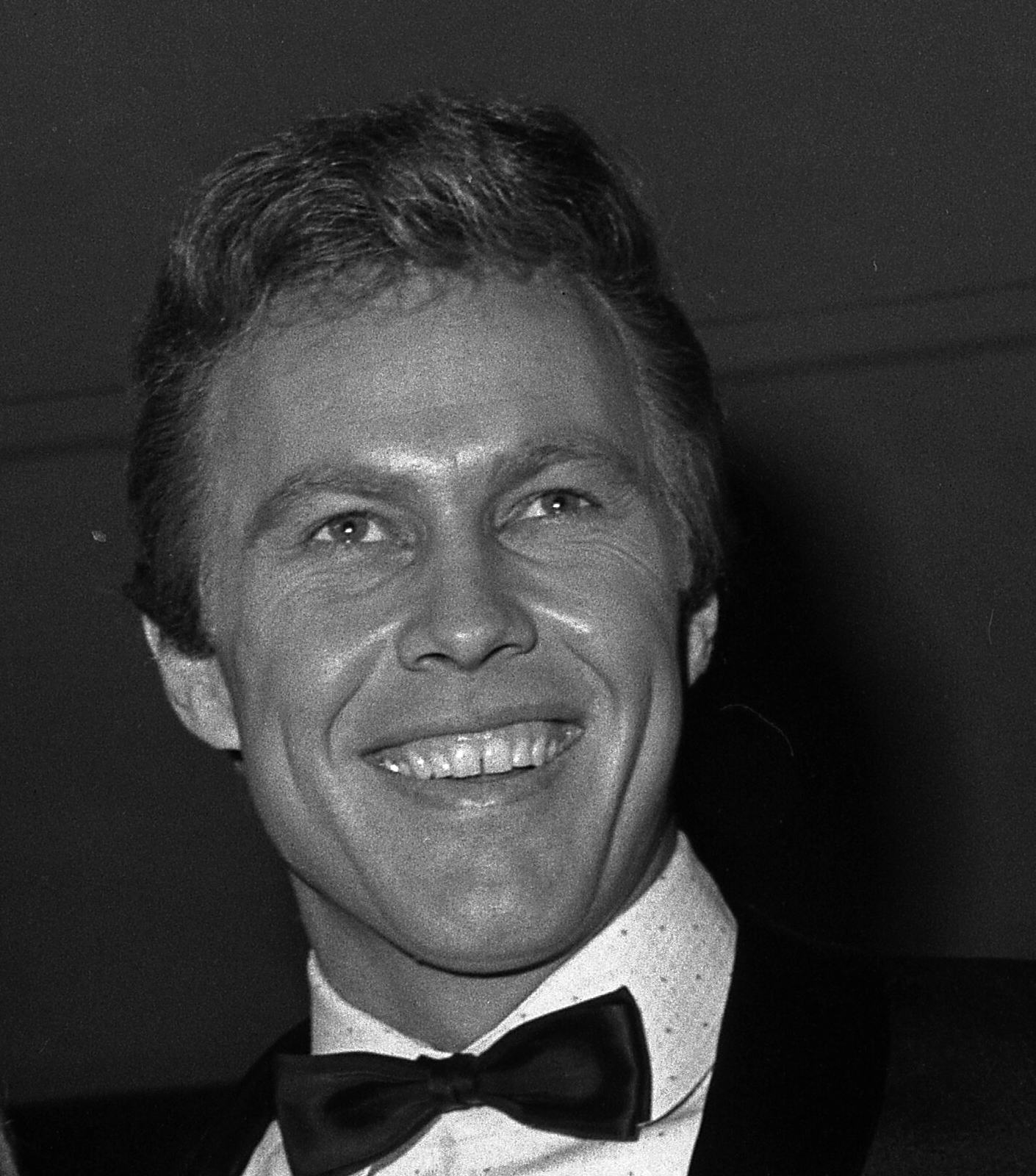
- Presnell in 1964
- Born: September 14, 1933; Modesto, California, U.S.
- Died: June 30, 2009 (aged 75); Santa Monica, California, U.S.
- Occupations: Film and television actor; musical theatre and opera singer
- Years active: 1956–2009
- Spouses: Sheryl Mae Green (m. 1957; div. 1966) Veeva Suzanne Hamblen (m. 1966)
- Children: 6

George Harvey Presnell (/prɛzˈnɛl/; September 14, 1933 – June 30, 2009) was an American actor and singer. He began his career in the mid-1950s as a classical baritone, singing with orchestras and opera companies throughout the United States.

His career was reoriented away from classical music to musical theatre in 1960 after Meredith Willson cast him in a leading role in his new Broadway musical The Unsinkable Molly Brown. His portrayal of "Leadville Johnny" was a resounding success and he reprised the role in the 1964 film version of the musical, winning a Golden Globe Award for his portrayal.

Presnell went on to star in a few more films during the 1960s, but by the early 1970s that aspect of his career came to a standstill. From 1970 to 1995 he mostly worked as a musical theatre performer on Broadway, the West End, and in touring productions out of New York. In his early 60s, Presnell saw a resurgence in his movie career which lasted until his death. He played character roles in films like Fargo (1996), The Whole Wide World (1996), Saving Private Ryan (1998), and Flags of Our Fathers (2006). He also appeared on television as Mr. Parker in The Pretender and Lew Staziak in Andy Barker, P.I. He had recurring roles on Lois & Clark: The New Adventures of Superman and Dawson's Creek.

== Early life and classical singing career ==
Presnell was born in 1933, in Modesto, California. He made his professional stage debut performing in an opera at the young age of sixteen. He attended the University of Southern California, earning a bachelor's degree in vocal performance.

He then pursued further vocal studies in Europe and at the Music Academy of the West. He appeared with a number of opera companies and orchestras during the 1950s. In 1957 he made his debut with the San Francisco Opera as the Officer in Richard Strauss's Ariadne auf Naxos.

He went on to sing several more comprimario roles with the company that year, including the Jailer in the United States premiere of Francis Poulenc's Dialogues of the Carmelites. During the late 1950s he made several appearances and recordings with both the Roger Wagner Chorale and the Philadelphia Orchestra, the latter under the baton of Eugene Ormandy.

== Stage and film career ==
In 1956, Presnell co-starred with Herva Nelli in the American premiere of Darius Milhaud's opera David at the Hollywood Bowl. In 1960, he was a featured soloist with the Los Angeles Philharmonic in another concert at the Bowl. In attendance at the concert was musical theater composer Meredith Willson who was at that time in the midst of creating his musical on the life of Molly Brown, Titanic survivor. Willson contacted him after the concert and asked him to audition for him. Presnell complied and Willson ended up offering him the role of "Leadville Johnny." At this point the musical was not completed and Willson went on to compose much of the music for Leadville Johnny with Presnell's voice in mind. On November 3, 1960, The Unsinkable Molly Brown opened on Broadway at the Winter Garden Theatre to a resounding success. Presnell stayed with the show for its entire 532-performance run, which ended on February 10, 1962. He reprised the role in the 1964 film The Unsinkable Molly Brown for which he won a Golden Globe Award for New Star of the Year.

He starred in two films in 1965: portraying Sol Rogers, a cavalry scout, in The Glory Guys and Danny Churchill, the romantic lead, in the musical film When the Boys Meet the Girls. He had one more sizable film role in the 1960s, the role of "Rotten Luck Willie" in Paramount's 1969 musical Western film Paint Your Wagon, singing "They Call the Wind Maria". The New York Times critic opined that Presnell's role "delivered the golden opportunity to sing the unforgettable ballad." Theater reviewer Thomas Hischak wrote "in one of the film's few pleasing moments, Harve Presnell gave full voice to They Call the Wind Mariah and it was lovely to hear". Referring to Eastwood and Marvin, film reviewer Brian W. Fairbanks wrote that "Harve Presnell steals both stars' thunder with a knockout version of the best song."

Presnell did some other film and television work in the 1960s and early 1970s, but for the next couple of decades concentrated primarily on stage work, playing Rhett Butler in the West End production of Scarlett and touring the United States as Daddy Warbucks in Annie and its sequel, Annie Warbucks, among other productions. In 1966, Presnell played the role of Sir Lancelot in Camelot in the Regional Equity production at The Houston Music Theatre.

In 1984, Presnell appeared as Don Quixote in Man of La Mancha in Darien, Connecticut, an appearance well received by The New York Times critic Alvin Klein, who wrote that Presnell was "a winning leading man", and wrote:

As an actor, Mr. Presnell promises much, and as a singer, he delivers. Here is one of the shiniest vocal accounts of the role yet. The actor is on the verge of suggesting that in his implausible way, the Don can bring a measure of grace to the world and fulfill that old impossible dream.

His film career was revived when he played William H. Macy's testy father-in-law in Fargo (1996). Subsequent films included The Whole Wide World (1996), Larger than Life (1996), The Chamber (1996), Face/Off (1997), Julian Po (1997), Saving Private Ryan (1998, as General George C. Marshall), Patch Adams (1998), Walking Across Egypt (1999), The Legend of Bagger Vance (2000), The Family Man (2000), Escanaba in da Moonlight (2001), Mr. Deeds (2002), Super Sucker (2003), Flags of Our Fathers (2006), and Evan Almighty (2007).

On television, he appeared, in among other roles, as Mr. Parker on The Pretender, Dr. Sam Lane on Lois & Clark: The New Adventures of Superman, and as A.I. Brooks on Dawson's Creek.

== Recordings ==
Presnell sang the baritone role in Eugene Ormandy's 1960 recording of Carmina Burana, released by Columbia/Sony on LP and CD. His earliest recordings were as a soloist with the Roger Wagner Chorale (Capitol) in the 1950s with the Chorale in the background particularly in the LP Joy to the World where he sang in "O Holy Night" and the LPs Folk Songs of the New World [Capitol P8324 (1955)] and Folk Songs of the Frontier [Capitol P8332 (1956)], where he sang, among other songs, "Bury Me Not on the Lone Prairie" and "Streets of Laredo".

== Personal life and death ==
Presnell's second wife, Veeva Suzanne Hamblen, was the daughter of singer and actor Stuart Hamblen.

Presnell died on June 30, 2009, aged 75, from pancreatic cancer at Saint John's Health Center in Santa Monica, California.

== Filmography ==
=== Film ===
Year	Title	Role	Notes
1964	The Unsinkable Molly Brown	Johnny Brown	
1965	The Glory Guys	Scout Sol Rogers	
1965	When the Boys Meet the Girls	Danny Churchill	
1969	Paint Your Wagon	Rotten Luck Willie	
1996	The Whole Wide World	Dr. Howard	
1996	Fargo	Wade Gustafson	
1996	Larger than Life	Trowbridge Bowers	
1996	The Chamber	Attorney General Roxburgh	
1997	Face/Off	Victor Lazarro	
1997	Julian Po	Mayor Henry Leech	
1998	Saving Private Ryan	George C. Marshall	
1998	Patch Adams	Dean Anderson	
1999	Walking Across Egypt	Finner	
2000	The Legend of Bagger Vance	John Invergordon	
2000	The Family Man	Ed Reynolds	
2001	Escanaba in da Moonlight	Albert Soady	
2002	Super Sucker	Winslow Schnaebelt	
2002	Mr. Deeds	Preston Blake	
2003	Old School	Mr. Springbrook	
2006	Flags of Our Fathers	Older Dave Severance	
2007	Evan Almighty	Congressman Burrows	
2010	Love Ranch	Dr. Smathers	Posthumous release (final role)

=== Television ===
Year	Title	Role	Notes
1955–1956	General Electric Theater	Dismas	2 episodes
1956	Alfred Hitchcock Presents	Mitch	Season 1 Episode 22: "Place of Shadows" (uncredited) (possible deleted scenes)
1965	The Red Skelton Show	Lawyer Harkness	1 episode
1972	The Great Man's Whiskers	Ballad Singer	Television film
1984	Ryan's Hope	Matthew Crane	5 episodes
1995	The Client	Buddy Hutchinson	1 episode
1995–1997	Lois and Clark: The New Adventures of Superman	Dr. Sam Lane	Recurring role, 5 episodes
1996	Nash Bridges	Corick McMillan	1 episode
1996	EZ Streets	Jack DeLanae	1 episode
1996	Star Trek: Voyager	Colonel Q	1 episode
1996	The Real Adventures of Jonny Quest	Doug / NRC Man #2 (voice)	1 episode
1997	Grace Under Fire	Jack	1 episode
1997	Tidal Wave: No Escape	Stanley Schiff	Television film
1997	Duckman	Sir Declan McManus (voice)	1 episode
1997	Players	Roy Erickson	1 episode
1997–2000	The Pretender	Mr. Parker	Recurring role, 31 episodes
1998	A Bright Shining Lie	General Paul Harkins	Television film
1998	Two Guys, a Girl and a Pizza Place	Edgar J. Hagerty	1 episode
1998	The Outer Limits	Greg Matheson	1 episode
1998	The Lionhearts	Leo Lionheart Sr. (voice)	Main cast, 7 episodes
1999	Payne	Colonel Forest Brinkman	1 episode
2000–2001	Dawson's Creek	Arthur Brooks	Recurring role, 5 episodes
2001	The Pretender 2001	Mr. Parker	Television film
2001	Jackie, Ethel, Joan: The Women of Camelot	Joseph P. Kennedy Sr.	Television film
2001	The Pretender: Island of the Haunted	Mr. Parker	Television film
2003	Strong Medicine	Andy Marsh	1 episode
2003	Frasier	Mike Shaw	1 episode
2003	Hope & Faith	Jack	1 episode
2003	The Practice	Judge Dickem	1 episode
2003	The Lyon's Den	Elliott Beacon	1 episode
2004	Charmed	Captain Black Jack Cutting	1 episode
2005	Monk	Zach Ellinghouse	1 episode
2006	ER	Mr. Venema	1 episode
2007	Andy Barker, P.I.	Lew Staziak	Main cast, 6 episodes
2007; 2009	American Dad!	Judge	2 episodes
2009	Cold Case	Harry Kemp '09	1 episode
