= Arachnophobia (film) =

1990 film directed by Frank Marshall

- Theatrical release poster by John Alvin
- Directed by: Frank Marshall
- Screenplay by: Don Jakoby Wesley Strick
- Story by: Don Jakoby Al Williams
- Produced by: Kathleen Kennedy; Richard Vane
- Starring: Jeff Daniels; Julian Sands; Harley Jane Kozak; John Goodman
- Cinematography: Mikael Salomon
- Edited by: Michael Kahn
- Music by: Trevor Jones
- Production companies: Hollywood Pictures; Amblin Entertainment; Tangled Web Productions
- Distributed by: Buena Vista Pictures Distribution
- Release date: July 18, 1990
- Running time: 110 minutes
- Country: United States
- Language: English
- Budget: $22 million
- Box office: $53.2 million

Arachnophobia is a 1990 American horror comedy film directed by Frank Marshall in his directorial debut from a screenplay by Don Jakoby and Wesley Strick. Starring Jeff Daniels and John Goodman, the film follows a small California town that becomes invaded by a deadly spider species and the residents' struggle against them to avert an ecological crisis.

The film was the first produced by Hollywood Pictures, a subsidiary of Walt Disney Studios. Arachnophobia was released in the United States on July 18, 1990. The film received positive critical reviews and grossed $53.2 million on a $22 million budget.

== Plot ==
In a remote Venezuelan tepui, British entomologist Dr. James Atherton leads an expedition to discover new insect species. His photographer, Jerry Manley, is bitten by a previously undiscovered, highly venomous spider of prehistoric origin, and suffers a severe seizure from the venom and dies. Atherton and his crew send Jerry's body back to his hometown of Canaima, California, unaware that the spider has crawled into the coffin.

Jerry's desiccated body arrives at the mortuary of mortician Irv Kendall. The spider escapes from the coffin, is picked up by a crow and bites the bird. The crow falls dead outside the barn of Ross Jennings, a family physician who has moved from San Francisco to take over the practice of the retiring town doctor. Ross and his son both suffer from arachnophobia.

Ross is short of patients after Sam Metcalf, the elderly town doctor, hesitates about retiring. The Venezuelan spider mates with a house spider in the Jennings' barn. The domestic spider produces hundreds of infertile, drone offspring with their father's lethal bite, and they leave the nest after consuming their mother.

Ross's first patient, Margaret Hollins, dies after being bitten by one of the new spiders, and he doubts Metcalf's diagnosis of a heart attack. Another arachnid kills high school football player Todd Miller just after Ross conducted a routine team checkup, earning him the nickname of "Dr. Death". The next victim is Metcalf himself, who is bitten and dies in front of his wife.

With Metcalf dead, Ross becomes Canaima's town doctor. Knowing that Metcalf was bitten by a spider and a "minute amount of an as-yet unidentified toxic substance" was detected in his body, he suspects that the town may be infested by deadly arachnids.

Ross calls Atherton and asks him to help his investigation. The skeptical entomologist sends Chris Collins, his assistant. Ross and county coroner Milt Briggs order that Margaret and Todd be exhumed. They perform autopsies, and Chris confirms Ross's suspicion after he identifies bite marks. Ross and Chris catch two of the spiders (one had died of a natural cause) in Metcalf's house the following day. When Chris mentions the new species discovered by Atherton, Ross realizes that the town's killer spiders and Atherton's discovery are related.

Atherton joins Ross, Chris, Milt, Sheriff Lloyd Parsons, and exterminator Delbert McClintock in Canaima, and they discover the spiders have a short lifespan due to their crossbreeding. Atherton tells them that the spiders are soldiers sent to eliminate potential threats for the male spider leading the colony, which he calls "the general". He learns that the general produced a queen and inbred with her to produce a second nest (guarded by the queen) which could produce fertile offspring, culminating in the species' next stage of evolution and worldwide dispersal.

Ross, Chris, and Delbert discover that one nest is in Ross's barn. When he destroys the nest, Delbert finds Atherton dead. He had attempted to catch the general and purposely touched a strand of the web to coax the spider out, but was bitten by the male spider which then escaped. Chris gets the Jennings family out of their infested house, but Ross falls through the floor into his wine cellar: the spiders' second nest, guarded by both the queen and the general.

After he electrocutes the queen, Ross battles the general while he tries to burn the second egg sac (overcoming his fear of spiders by focusing on his need to stop them). Trapped by fallen debris as the general prepares to bite him, Ross stays perfectly still until the general is in position, then flings the spider into the fire. Despite being badly burnt, the general leaps out from the fire just as the egg sac hatches. Ross shoots the general with a nail gun, sending the flaming spider into the egg sac and destroying the nest. Delbert rescues Ross; with the general, the queen and the nests destroyed and the soldiers dying, the spiders' threat is over. Deciding that they missed their old life, the Jennings family returns to San Francisco. As they celebrate their safe return home, an earthquake hits, which they prefer over deadly spiders.

== Cast ==
- Jeff Daniels as Dr. Ross Jennings
- Harley Jane Kozak as Molly Jennings
- John Goodman as Delbert McClintock
- Julian Sands as Dr. James Atherton
- Brian McNamara as Chris Collins
- James Handy as Milt Briggs
- Peter Jason as Henry Beechwood
- Henry Jones as Dr. Sam Metcalf
- Frances Bay as Evelyn Metcalf
- Mark L. Taylor as Jerry Manley
- Roy Brocksmith as Irv Kendall
- Kathy Kinney as Blaire Kendall
- Stuart Pankin as Sheriff Lloyd Parsons
- Mary Carver as Margaret Hollins

== Production ==
Steven Spielberg was involved with Arachnophobia, with Frank Marshall (one of his earlier producers, as well as a second unit director for a few Amblin films) directing for the first time. Spielberg and Marshall were the film's executive producers, and Amblin Entertainment received a production credit. Marshall intended that the film would be reminiscent of Alfred Hitchcock's The Birds: "People like to be scared but laughing, like a roller coaster. No one wants to be terrified". Arachnophobia also bears similarities to the 1977 film Kingdom of the Spiders.

Jamie Hyneman of MythBusters said in Popular Mechanics that Arachnophobia was one of the first films on which he worked, and he often relied on simple magnets for effects. The film used over 300 Avondale spiders from New Zealand, chosen for their large size, unusually social lifestyle, and harmlessness to humans; they were guided around the set by heat and cold. The large spider from Venezuela, called "The General" in the movie, was portrayed by an Amazon Bird Eating Tarantula, also known as a Goliath bird eater. It's the largest known spider in existence and was referred to as Big Bob on set, and was rendered even bulkier and more menacing with a prosthetic on its abdomen. The spiders were managed and handled by famed entomologist Steven R. Kutcher.

Arachnophobia was primarily filmed in Cambria, California, which was the setting of the fictional Californian coastal town of Canaima; the introductory and jungle scenes were filmed in Canaima National Park in southern Venezuela. The school scenes were filmed at Coast Union High School, with students and staff used in the football scenes and group events; players in the locker room were CUHS student athletes. For the sound effect of spiders being crushed, Foley artists stepped on mustard packages or potato chips. For the sound effect of the spiders crawling through the heating ducts, long fingernails were used on pieces of tin to create the scurrying sound.

== Release and reception ==
Arachnophobia was the first film released by Hollywood Pictures. Advertisers were uncertain if they should market it as a thriller or a comedy, and television commercials for the film called it a "thrill-omedy".

=== Box office ===
Arachnophobia debuted at number three (behind Ghost and Die Hard 2), earning $8 million over its first weekend. The film was a financial success, grossing $53,208,180 domestically and an additional $30 million in video rentals.

=== Critical response ===
In Leonard Maltin's Movie Guide, film critic Leonard Maltin calls Arachnophobia a "slick comic thriller", praising the acting with a caveat: "Not recommended for anyone who's ever covered their eyes during a movie". Writing for Newsweek, David Ansen compared the film to B movies "about the small town threatened by alien invaders", calling it well-made but "oddly unresonant." Roger Ebert of the Chicago Sun-Times said that the film made audiences "squirm out of enjoyment, not terror", and gave it three out of four stars.

Arachnophobia has a 92% rating based on 48 reviews at Rotten Tomatoes. The website's critical consensus reads, "Arachnophobia may not deliver genuine chills, but it's an affectionate, solidly built tribute to Hollywood's classic creature features." On Metacritic, the film has a score of 67 based on 22 reviews, indicating "generally favorable" reviews. Audiences polled by CinemaScore gave the film an average grade of "B+" on an A+ to F scale. Some people interested in spiders protested against the film, believing that it tarnished the public's view of spiders.

=== Accolades ===
Award	Category	Subject	Result
Saturn Awards	Best Horror Film		Won
Saturn Awards	Best Director	Frank Marshall	Nominated
Saturn Awards	Best Writing	Don Jakoby	Nominated
Saturn Awards	Best Writing	Wesley Strick	Nominated
Saturn Awards	Best Actor	Jeff Daniels	Won
Saturn Awards	Best Supporting Actor	John Goodman	Nominated
12th Young Artist Awards	Most Entertaining Family Youth Motion Picture - Comedy/Horror		Nominated
12th Young Artist Awards	Best Young Supporting Actress	Marlene Katz	Nominated

== Legacy ==
Researchers at the University of California, Riverside named a newly discovered worm species after Jeff Daniels' role in this movie. The worm, Tarantobelus jeffdanielsi, is one of only two known worms known to infect tarantulas.

== Merchandising ==
The video-game version of Arachnophobia was released in May 1991 for Amiga, Amstrad CPC, Commodore 64, and MS-DOS. Nicholas Edwards wrote a novelization of the film. Hollywood Comics (an imprint of Disney Comics) released a comic-book adaptation of the film, written by William Rotsler with art by Dan Spiegle. The characters in the comic adaptation bear little resemblance to those in the film.

Arachnophobia

Film score by Trevor Jones
- Released: July 20, 1990 (original release); March 19, 1996 (re-release)
- Studio: Evergreen Recording Studios
- Label: Hollywood

An Arachnophobia soundtrack album was released on July 18, 1990. It included Trevor Jones's instrumental music from the film, dialogue excerpts, and songs such as "Blue Eyes Are Sensitive to the Light" by Sara Hickman, "Caught in Your Web (Swear to Your Heart)" by Russell Hitchcock, and "I Left My Heart in San Francisco" by Tony Bennett.

== Future ==
In June 2022, it was announced that Atomic Monster and Amblin Partners would produce a remake of the film. James Wan and Michael Clear will serve as producers, while Frank Marshall who directed the original film will serve as executive producer; while Christopher Landon was hired to write and direct the movie.

Landon announced that he had left the project due to creative differences; explaining that his draft of the script would have included the return of John Goodman's character Delbert McClintock from the original in the story, and incorporated the use of body horror elements as well. Though he was no longer involved, the filmmaker confirmed that the project is in active development through its production studios.

== See also ==
- List of American films of 1990
- Cultural depictions of spiders
