= Swear to Your Heart =

1990 song by Russell Hitchcock

Single by Russell Hitchcock

from the album Arachnophobia (Original Motion Picture Soundtrack)
- Released: December 1990
- Genre: Soft rock
- Label: Hollywood
- Songwriter: Diane Warren
- Producer: John Boylan

Russell Hitchcock singles chronology
"The Sun Ain't Gonna Shine Anymore" (1988)	"Swear to Your Heart" (1990)	"I Am Australian" (1997)

"Swear to Your Heart" (also titled "Caught in Your Web (Swear to Your Heart)") is a song recorded by Air Supply lead singer Russell Hitchcock in 1990. The song was written by Diane Warren. It is a track from the soundtrack album of the 1990 film Arachnophobia. The song features Timothy B. Schmit on backing vocals.

"Swear to Your Heart" was released as a CD single, and became a hit on the U.S. and Canadian Adult Contemporary charts, reaching number 9 and number 12 respectively, during early 1991.

== Chart history ==
=== Weekly charts ===
Chart (1990–91)	Peak position
Canada RPM Adult Contemporary	12
US Billboard Adult Contemporary	9

=== Year-end charts ===
Chart (1991)	Rank
Canada RPM Adult Contemporary	86
