= Jackie, Ethel, Joan: The Women of Camelot =

- Based on: Jackie, Ethel, Joan: Women of Camelot by J. Randy Taraborrelli
- Written by: David Stevens
- Directed by: Larry Shaw
- Starring: Jill Hennessy; Lauren Holly; Leslie Stefanson; Daniel Hugh Kelly; Robert Knepper; Matt Letscher; Harve Presnell; Charmion King
- Composer: Martin Davich
- Country of origin: United States
- Original language: English
- No. of episodes: 2

Production
- Executive producer: Sheri Singer
- Producer: Kay Hoffman
- Cinematography: Frank Byers
- Editor: Terry Blythe
- Running time: 163 minutes
- Production companies: Just Singer Entertainment; Hallmark Entertainment

Original release
- Network: NBC
- Release: March 4 – March 5, 2001

Jackie, Ethel, Joan: The Women of Camelot is a 2001 American drama miniseries directed by Larry Shaw and written by David Stevens. It is based on the 2000 book Jackie, Ethel, Joan: Women of Camelot by J. Randy Taraborrelli. The film stars Jill Hennessy, Lauren Holly, Leslie Stefanson, Daniel Hugh Kelly, Robert Knepper, Matt Letscher, Harve Presnell and Charmion King. The film premiered on NBC in two parts on March 4, 2001, and March 5, 2001.

== Cast ==
- Jill Hennessy as Jackie Bouvier Kennedy
- Lauren Holly as Ethel Skakel Kennedy
- Leslie Stefanson as Joan Bennett Kennedy
- Daniel Hugh Kelly as John F. Kennedy
- Robert Knepper as Robert F. Kennedy
- Matt Letscher as Ted Kennedy
- Harve Presnell as Joseph P. Kennedy Sr.
- Charmion King as Rose Kennedy
- Wayne Best as George Smathers
- Walker Boone as Steve Clark
- Christopher Britton as Ted's Doctor
- Catherine Bruce as Sister Mary Leo
- Adam Cabral as John F. Kennedy Jr.
- Thom Christopher as Aristotle Onassis
- William Colgate as Richard Nixon
- Beau Dunker as Ted Kennedy Jr.
- David Eisner as Schiff
- Greg Ellwand as Peter Wilson
- Madison Fitzpatrick as Caroline Kennedy
- Richard Fitzpatrick as Frank Peters
- Linda Goranson as Lady Bird Johnson
- Paul Thomas Gordon as Peter Lawford
- Kate Hemblen as Joan's Nanny
- Shannon Hile as Elaine Mitchell
- Tom Howard as Lyndon B. Johnson
- Jeno Huber as Prince Stanisław Albrecht Radziwiłł
- Jamie Johnston as Young Patrick Kennedy
- Geoff Kahnert as Sargent Shriver
- Ray Kahnert as Bobby's Priest
- Tamsin Kelsey as Eunice Kennedy Shriver
- Anne L'Espérance as Cathy
- Sarah Lafleur as Marilyn Monroe
- Shawn Lawrence as Alex Carter
- Gene Mack as Rosey Grier
- Louisa Martin as Maud Shaw
- Kaya McGregor as Pat Kennedy
- Nicole Michaux as Jean Ann Smith
- Julia Pagel as Kathleen Kennedy
- Rosemary Pate as Kara
- Karl Pruner as Clinton Hill
- Matt Sadowski as Joseph P. Kennedy II
- Jeffrey Smith as Jim Ketchum
- Joy Tanner as Lee Bouvier
- Bruce Vavrina as Roger Mudd
- Jonathan Whittaker as Lem Billings
- Brad Wietersen as Stephen Edward Smith
