= Tarantobelus jeffdanielsi =

Scientific classification
- Domain: Eukaryota
- Kingdom: Animalia
- Phylum: Nematoda
- Class: Secernentea
- Order: Tylenchida
- Family: Panagrolaimidae
- Genus: Tarantobelus
- Species: T. jeffdanielsi

Binomial name
- Tarantobelus jeffdanielsi Schurkman et al. 2022

Species of nematode

Tarantobelus jeffdanielsi is a species of nematode, and is one of only two species known to infect tarantulas.

== History ==
T. jeffdanielsi was discovered in 2018 when a wholesale breeder noticed white discharge in the mouths of their tarantulas, and strange behavior prior to death. This discharge were the nematodes in the tarantula's oral cavity.

== Biology ==
The nematodes infect the oral cavity of a tarantula. The host will begin to lose control of its appendages and fangs, causing starvation and a 'tip toe' like walking behavior. The nematodes only infect the tarantula's mouth, suggesting they may feed on bacteria that lives on tarantulas rather than the actual tarantula.

== Taxonomy ==
T. jeffdanielsi was named after actor Jeff Daniels for his role in the 1990 movie Arachnophobia.
