= Craig Pospisil =

American dramatist

Craig Pospisil is an American playwright, musical bookwriter and filmmaker. He has written nine full-length plays and musicals, mostly comedies, and more than 40 short plays and musicals.

== Biography ==
Pospisil was born and raised in New York City, where he attended Trinity School. He graduated from Wesleyan University, and later studied playwriting in the Dramatic Writing Program in the Tisch School of the Arts at New York University. His plays are published by Dramatists Play Service, Theatrical Rights Worldwide (TRW), and Playscripts, Inc., and have appeared in the publications such as Plays and Playwrights 2001, Take Ten II, Under Thirty, Best Ten Minute Plays 2005, Best Ten Minute Plays 2006, Best American Short Plays 2010-2011, Best Ten Minute Plays 2012, and Best Ten Minute Plays 2015, from publishers Smith & Kraus, Applause TheatreBooks, Heinemann and Vintage Books. He is a member of the Dramatists Guild.

He is best known for the plays Months on End, which had its world premiere at the Purple Rose Theatre Company in Chelsea, Michigan, Journey to the Poles of Inaccessibility, which had its world premiere at the Unicorn Theatre (Kansas City), and Somewhere in Between, which had its professional premiere at Detroit Repertory Company, but he has also had success with his short plays, such as It's Not You, On the Edge and Infant Morality. His plays have been seen at Ensemble Studio Theatre, New World Stages, Barrington Stage Company, Bay Street Theater, City Theatre (Miami), New York Musical Theatre Festival, Road Theatre, Vital Theater, West Coast Ensemble, and the Caldwell Theater, and have been performed in Austria, Australia, Canada, China, Denmark, England, France, Germany, Greece, Japan, Mexico, Peru, Samoa, Spain, Vietnam and Zimbabwe. His plays have been translated into Cantonese, Danish, French, Greek, Japanese, Mandarin and Spanish. He has worked on the musicals Drift and Dot Comet, commissioned by the New Musical Development Fund. Also, Pospisil was Head Writer for theAtrainplays', and he wrote his short plays It's Not You, Free and Tourist Attraction for some of their 24-hour theater productions.

In 2015, Pospisil adapted a scene from his play Months on End into a short film, January, which he also directed. January was an official selection at the Bahamas International Film Festival, Big Apple Film Festival, Berkshire International Film Festival, Cayman Islands International Film Festival, Laughlin International Film Festival, Black Bear Film Festival, Sacramento Film Festival, and more. In 2016, Pospisil, Arlene Hutton and other playwrights co-wrote the play The Gorges Motel, which ran in the 20th annual New York International Fringe Festival. They went on to write One Christmas Eve at Evergreen Mall, which premiered in the 21st annual New York International Fringe Festival, and By The Numbers.

Pospisil worked for many years as the Director of Nonprofessional Licensing for Dramatists Play Service., where he created and edited Outstanding Men’s Monologues, Volumes 1 & 2, Outstanding Women’s Monologues, Volumes 1 & 2, and the anthologies Outstanding Short Plays, Volumes 1, 2, 3 & 4. He has also edited two volumes of short plays by the Pulitzer Prize-winning playwright William Inge, entitled The Apartment Complex and Somewhere in America. In October 2021, Pospisil joined Theatrical Rights Worldwide, as a Vice President for TRW Plays, where he will work on licensing and acquisitions of new works. He has edited three anthologies TRW Presents: Short Plays, Vol. 1, 2 and 3 as well as TRW Presents: Men's Monologues and TRW Presents: Women's Monologues. Pospisil has been a guest lecturer and teacher at the Last Frontier Theatre Conference, Kennedy Center American College Theater Festival, Hollins University and Loyola Marymount University. His works have also been produced on the radio by Stage Shadows Inc.

== Awards ==
Pospisil was honored by the Kennedy Center American College Theatre Festival for "Excellence in Playwriting" on January 29, 2011 at the conference for Region 1 of the festival. He is a six time finalist for the Heideman Award at the Actors Theatre of Louisville's Humana Festival of New American Plays, and has twice been a finalist for the National Playwrights Conference at the Eugene O'Neill Center in Connecticut.

The Dunes

- Winner – Theatre Conspiracy's Ninth Annual New Play Contest

Months on End

- Winner – Inter-Play Festival, Shipping Dock Theatre, Rochester, NY
- Winner – New Play Project, Backdoor Theatre, Wichita Falls, TX
- Winner – Towngate Theatre Playwriting Contest, Oglebay Institute, Wheeling, WV

The American Dream Revisited

- Alan Minieri Playwrighting Award, Turnip Theatre, New York, NY

Somewhere in Between

- Winner – FutureFest, Dayton Playhouse, Dayton, OH
- Winner – Inter-Play Festival, Shipping Dock Theatre, Rochester, NY

== Works ==
=== Full length plays and musicals ===
- Journey to the Poles of Inaccessibility
- By the Numbers (co-author)
- One Christmas Eve at Evergreen Mall (co-author)
- The Gorges Motel (co-author)
- The Dunes
- Dot Comet (musical – music & lyrics by Michael Ogborn)
- Drift (musical – music & lyrics by Jeremy Schonfeld)
- Months on End
- Somewhere in Between)

=== Collections ===
- Choosing Sides (2009)
- Life is Short (2005)

=== One-acts and short plays ===
- The American Dream Revisited
- The Best Way to Go
- Class Conflict
- Dissonance
- Double Wedding
- Free'
- Guerilla Gorilla
- Guns Don't Kill
- Happenstance
- Her Head on the Pillow
- In a Word
- Infant Morality
- It's Not You
- Kissing Cousins - as part of the play The Gorges Motel
- The Last December
- Manhattan Drum-Taps
- A Mother's Love
- 'No Child Left
- On the Edge
- On the Wings of a Butterfly
- Perchance
- Quandary in Quando
- A Quiet Empty Life
- There's No Here Here
- Tourist Attraction
- Train of Thought
- What Price?
- Whatever
