= Super Sucker =

2002 film by Jeff Daniels

- Film poster
- Directed by: Jeff Daniels
- Written by: Jeff Daniels
- Story by: Jeff Daniels; Guy Sanville
- Produced by: Tom Spiroff
- Starring: Jeff Daniels; Matt Letscher; Harve Presnell; Dawn Wells; John Seibert; Guy Sanville; Kate Packham; Sandra Birch; Michelle Mountain; Will Young
- Cinematography: Richard Brauer
- Edited by: Robert Tomlinson
- Music by: Alto Reed
- Production company: Purple Rose Films
- Release dates: February 24, 2002 (Jackson, MI premiere); January 24, 2003 (US release)
- Running time: 95 minutes
- Country: United States
- Language: English

Super Sucker is a 2002 film featuring Jeff Daniels, Harve Presnell, Matt Letscher, and Dawn Wells.

== Plot ==
Fred Barlow (Daniels) and Winslow Schnaebelt (Presnell), are the heads of two different door-to-door vacuum cleaner distributors, with salesmen who are competing for the same territory. Their rivalry becomes so fierce that the president of the manufacturer of the product, Mr. Suckerton, decides that for the good of the company, the town will have only one group of sales representatives. Desperate, and always the underdog, Barlow suggests a winner-take-all sales contest to determine who gets the territory. Well behind Schnaebelt from the very start, Barlow's sales surge when he learns of his wife's non-traditional use of, the circular nap nipper, a "homemaker's little helper", a long forgotten vacuum attachment.

== Cast ==
- Jeff Daniels as Fred Barlow
- Matt Letscher as Howard Butterworth
- Harve Presnell as Winslow Schnaebelt
- Dawn Wells as herself
- John Seibert as Shelby
- Guy Sanville as Leonard
- Kate Packham as Darlene
- Sandra Birch as Rhonda
- Michelle Mountain as Bunny Barlow
- Will Young as Clifford

== Production ==
Daniels made Super Sucker in Jackson, Michigan, and Toronto, Ontario, Canada, with Michigan performers and technicians.

== Release ==
Super Sucker opened on 24 January 2003 (Super Bowl weekend), on 125 screens in Michigan, Illinois, Wisconsin, Minnesota, Ohio, Kansas, and Missouri, but never obtained national distribution. Purple Rose is the distribution company and the distributor.

"It didn’t do as well as we had hoped when we released it in the Midwest. We had hoped it would do better, but distributing a film, particularly by yourself, is always a dicey enterprise. The video and DVD deal is in place, so we project it will make its money back. Domestic theatrical distribution is just a very difficult thing." — Jeff Daniels

== Reception ==
Super Sucker won the 2002 Audience Award for Best Feature at HBO's U.S. Comedy Arts Festival in Aspen, Colorado.

"I haven't a clue what this movie is about." — Christopher Borrelli, film critic, Toledo Blade.

"I cannot recommend this movie highly enough. Jeff Daniels has crafted a comedy that is intelligent, well-acted, and laugh-out-loud funny." — Moriarty, Ain't It Cool News

"A solid mix of lowball and under-the-breath humor, Super Sucker is a balanced and worthwhile film." — Nathan Lichtman, The Badger Herald

"Super Sucker... is a terrible movie. But that doesn’t prevent it from being interesting and even admirable as a grassroots phenomenon." — Jonathan Rosenbaum, Chicago Reader (January 24, 2003)

"Daniels (goes) for big, tawdry, gloriously cheap yuks. Bless him for it" — Tom Lang, Detroit News

"This is juvenile stuff (not a bad thing) and Super Sucker makes no bones about its meaning or pedigree (also not a bad thing)" — Erin Podolsky, Metro Times
