= John John in the Sky =

- Directed by: Jefferson Davis
- Written by: Jefferson Davis; Kari Skogland
- Produced by: Wakako Miyakuni
- Starring: Matt Letscher; Christian Craft
- Cinematography: Joel Daavid
- Edited by: Brian Ufberg
- Music by: Christopher Ward
- Release date: June 17, 2001 (Method Fest)
- Running time: 103 minutes
- Countries: United States; Japan
- Language: English

John John in the Sky (also titled I'll Wave Back) is a 2001 American-Japanese drama film written by Jefferson Davis and Kari Skogland, directed by Davis and starring Matt Letscher and Christian Craft. It received mixed reviews from critics.

== Cast ==
- Matt Letscher as John Clairborne
- Christian Craft as John John
- Rusty Schwimmer as Zeola
- Randy Travis as John Claiborne
- Romy Rosemont as John's Mother
- Aunjanue Ellis as Earlene
- Gemini Bartlett

== Release ==
The film was shown at the Method Fest Independent Film Festival on June 17, 2001.

== Reception ==
Dave Lukens of The Dove Foundation gave the film a positive review and wrote, "Overall, this is a great film."

Robert Koehler of Variety gave the film a negative review and wrote, "If only the storytelling in helmer Jefferson Davis’ and co-writer Kari Skogland’s script of John John in the Sky had half the aching beauty and resonance of lenser Joel Daavid’s color-saturated images of a bygone rural South, this family drama would be a bracing experience. As it is, tale of a man recalling his coming of age plays like a false piece of dress-up Americana, its humanistic aims undermined every step of the way. Despite presence of country star Randy Travis, this slice of Dixie will fade quickly after modest fest exposure."

TV Guide gave the film a mixed review: "Although this convoluted father-son drama doesn’t always gel, it contains many affecting moments."
