= Escanaba in da Moonlight =

2001 film by Jeff Daniels

- Film poster
- Directed by: Jeff Daniels
- Written by: Jeff Daniels
- Based on: Escanaba in da Moonlight by Jeff Daniels
- Produced by: Tom Spiroff
- Starring: Jeff Daniels; Harve Presnell; Kimberly Norris Guerrero; Joey Albright; Randall Godwin; Wayne David Parker
- Cinematography: Richard Brauer
- Edited by: Robert Tomlinson
- Music by: Alto Reed
- Production company: Purple Rose Films
- Release date: January 26, 2001
- Running time: 91 minutes
- Country: United States
- Language: English

Escanaba in da Moonlight is a 2001 American comedy film written, directed, and starring Jeff Daniels. It is a comedy about hunting and hunting traditions and is set (and filmed) in the Escanaba, Michigan, area. The film uses Upper Peninsula language and slang. The movie is the film adaptation of the play of the same name, which premiered at Daniels' Purple Rose Theatre in Chelsea, Michigan.

== Plot ==
Reuben Soady (Daniels) goes to the hunting camp cottage, otherwise known as deer camp, with his father Albert (played by Harve Presnell), brother Remnar (Joey Albright) and Jimmy "The Jimmer" Negamanee from Menominee (Wayne David Parker). If Reuben, now 43, doesn't manage to shoot a buck by the end of the season, he will become the oldest Soady in recorded history not to have achieved this task, a taboo that leads people in the community to believe he is jinxed.

Reuben breaks with tradition, taking advice from his Native American wife Wolf Moon Dance (Kimberly Norris Guerrero), who offers him spiritual remedies involving a drink made with moose testicles and scenting himself with porcupine urine to protect him from evil spirits and attract his prey to him. After various unexplainable phenomena, they meet a DNR officer, Tom T. Treado (Randall Godwin), who claims to have literally seen God on the ridge.

At various times, Reuben, Jimmer, and ranger Tom all get possessed by spirits. Eventually, Reuben runs out into the cold wearing only his long underwear and a hat and finds himself face-to-face with the ghost of his dead great-grandfather, Alphonse Soady, who guides him to shooting a buck sent for him by the spirits. Reuben returns triumphantly.

== Cast ==
- Jeff Daniels as Reuben Soady
- Harve Presnell as Albert Soady
- Kimberly Norris Guerrero as Wolf Moon Dance Soady
- Joey Albright as Remnar Soady/Porcelain Bus Dancer
- Randall Godwin as Ranger Tom T. Treado
- Wayne David Parker as Jimmer Negamanee
- James Porterfield as Alphonse Soady
- Guy Sanville as Alvin Soady

== See also ==
- Yooper dialect
