= Jeff Daniels =

American actor (born 1955)

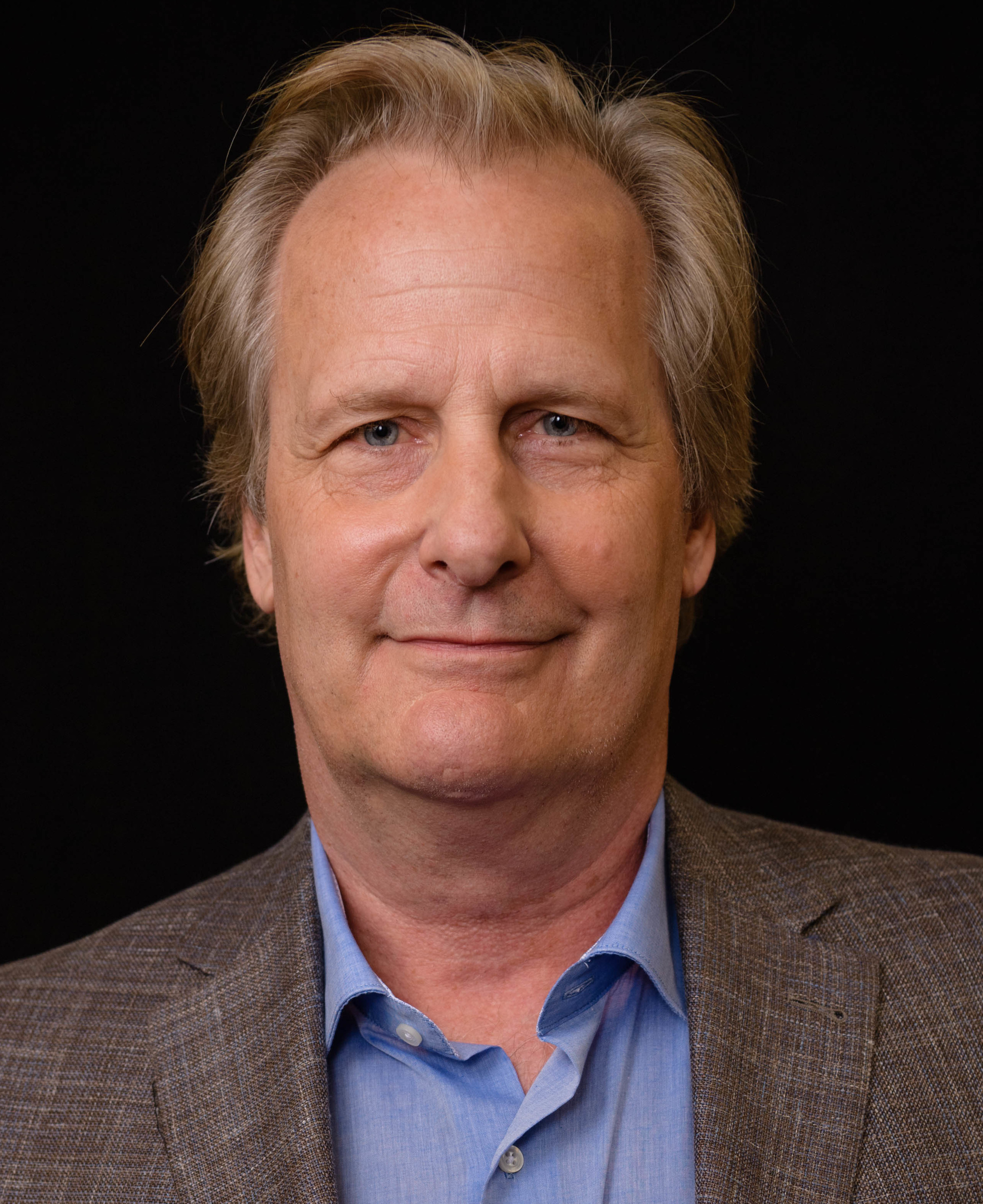
- Daniels at the 2018 Montclair Film Festival
- Born: Jeffrey Warren Daniels; February 19, 1955 (age 71); Athens, Georgia, U.S.
- Occupation: Actor
- Years active: 1976–present
- Spouse: Kathleen Rosemary Treado (m. 1979)
- Children: 3
- Website: jeffdaniels.com

Jeffrey Warren Daniels (born February 19, 1955) is an American actor and musician. He is known for his work on stage and screen playing diverse characters switching between comedy and drama. He is the recipient of several accolades, including two Primetime Emmy Awards, in addition to nominations for five Golden Globe Awards, five Screen Actors Guild Awards, and three Tony Awards.

He made his film debut in Miloš Forman's drama Ragtime (1981) followed by James L. Brooks's Terms of Endearment (1983), and Mike Nichols's Heartburn (1986). He then received three Golden Globe Award nominations for Woody Allen's The Purple Rose of Cairo (1985), Jonathan Demme's Something Wild (1986), and Noah Baumbach's The Squid and the Whale (2005). He starred in a variety of genre films such as Arachnophobia (1990), Gettysburg (1993), Speed (1994), Dumb and Dumber (1994), Fly Away Home (1996), 101 Dalmatians (1996), Pleasantville (1998), Because of Winn-Dixie (2005), RV (2006) and Dumb and Dumber To (2014). He also took roles in critically acclaimed films such as The Hours (2002), Good Night, and Good Luck (2005), Infamous (2006), Looper (2012), Steve Jobs (2015), and The Martian (2015).

From 2012 to 2014, Daniels starred as Will McAvoy in the HBO political drama series The Newsroom, for which he won the 2013 Primetime Emmy Award for Outstanding Lead Actor in a Drama Series and received Golden Globe and Screen Actors Guild Award nominations. He won a second Primetime Emmy Award in 2018 for his performance in the Netflix miniseries Godless (2017). He has portrayed real life figures such as John P. O'Neill in the Hulu miniseries The Looming Tower (2018) and FBI director James Comey in The Comey Rule (2020) for Showtime.

Daniels is also known for his roles on stage, making his Broadway debut in Gemini (1977). He went on to receive three nominations for the Tony Best Actor in a Play for his roles in Yasmina Reza's God of Carnage (2009), David Harrower's Blackbird (2016), and Aaron Sorkin's To Kill a Mockingbird (2018–2021). He is the founder and current executive director of the Chelsea, Michigan, Purple Rose Theatre Company.

== Early life and education ==
Daniels was born in Athens, Georgia, to Marjorie J. (née Ferguson) and Robert Lee "Bob" Daniels. He spent the first six weeks of his life in Georgia where his father was teaching before the family moved to his parents' native Michigan where he grew up in Chelsea. His father owned the Chelsea Lumber Company and was a one-time mayor of the town.

Daniels briefly attended Central Michigan University and participated in the school's theater program. In the summer of 1976, he attended the Eastern Michigan University drama school to participate in a special Bicentennial Repertory program, where he performed in The Hot L Baltimore and three other plays. Marshall W. Mason was the guest director at EMU, and he invited Daniels to come to New York to work at the Circle Repertory Theatre, where he performed in Fifth of July by Lanford Wilson in the 1977–1978 season. Daniels performed in New York in The Shortchanged Review (1979) at Second Stage Theatre.

== Career ==
=== 1977–1989: Early roles and breakthrough ===
Daniels starred in several New York productions, on and off Broadway. On Broadway, he made his debut as the assistant stage manager and various roles in the Albert Innaurato play Gemini (1977). He also acted in Lanford Wilson's Fifth of July (1980) alongside William Hurt, for which he was nominated for a Drama Desk Award for Best Supporting Actor, and starred in A. R. Gurney's The Golden Age (1984) with Stockard Channing. Daniels made his screen debut in Miloš Forman's Ragtime in 1981. His next film was in James L. Brooks's Terms of Endearment, which won the Academy Award for Best Picture. The film follows an emotional relationship between mother (Shirley MacLaine) and daughter (Debra Winger). Daniels plays Winger's callow and unfaithful husband, a role which would prove to be his breakthrough.

In 1985, Daniels starred in Woody Allen's Purple Rose of Cairo alongside Mia Farrow and Danny Aiello. The film was met with critical praise earning a 91% on Rotten Tomatoes with the consensus reading, "lighthearted and sweet, Purple Rose stands as one of Woody Allen's more inventive – and enchantingly whimsical – pictures." Daniels garnered a Golden Globe Award nomination for his performance. It was the film that inspired the name for the theater company he established. In 1986, he starred in Jonathan Demme's Something Wild as an unassuming businessman swept up into a wild night by a mysterious woman (Melanie Griffith) and earned his second Golden Globe nomination. Also that year, Daniels had a supporting role alongside Jack Nicholson and Meryl Streep in Heartburn, directed by Mike Nichols. In 1988, he co-starred with Kelly McGillis in Peter Yates' neo-noir The House on Carroll Street, and appeared in the ensemble dramedy Sweet Hearts Dance with Susan Sarandon, Don Johnson and Elizabeth Perkins. He had the lead in Checking Out (1989), which received only a limited theatrical release.

=== 1990–2008: Established actor ===
In 1990, Daniels starred in the thriller Arachnophobia. He also starred in a pair of romantic comedies, Love Hurts (1990) and The Butcher's Wife (1991), playing Demi Moore's love interest in the latter. His sci-fi vehicle Timescape (1992) went straight to video. His next significant role was as Colonel Joshua Chamberlain in Gettysburg (1993). Daniels reprised the role of Chamberlain 10 years later in the prequel film Gods and Generals.

Daniels continued his work in the theater with Redwood Curtain (1993). Off-Broadway, he starred in Lanford Wilson's Lemon Sky with Cynthia Nixon where he received a Drama Desk nomination for and an Obie Award for his performance in the Circle Repertory Company production of Johnny Got His Gun.

In 1994, Daniels co-starred with Jim Carrey in one of his most commercially successful films, Dumb and Dumber. It was a noted departure for Daniels, owing to his status as a dramatic actor. Earlier that year, Daniels appeared with Keanu Reeves in the action blockbuster Speed; the film was an enormous hit, grossing over $350 million at the box office. Daniels would then host Saturday Night Live a second time before the release of the 1996 Disney live-action remake of 101 Dalmatians. Daniels starred as the owner of a litter of dalmatians stolen by the evil Cruella De Vil (Glenn Close). The film was successful, grossing $320 million. Daniels plays a grungy cop Alvin Strayer along with Eric Stoltz in 2 Days in the Valley. Also in 1996 was the family hit film Fly Away Home with Daniels as the supportive single father of Anna Paquin's goose-raising preteen. Daniels then had a critical and commercial misfire with Trial and Error (1997). He would rebound, however, with 1998's Pleasantville as diner owner Bill Johnson, who learns to act as an individual and rebel against the norm at the urging of Tobey Maguire's David. Also starring Reese Witherspoon, Joan Allen, and Don Knotts, Pleasantville was nominated for three Academy Awards. Daniels starred alongside Christopher Lloyd's comedy My Favorite Martian.

Daniels starred in the TV films The Crossing, Cheaters, and the direct-to-video release Chasing Sleep. At this point, in the early 2000s, he began to focus more on his theater work at The Purple Rose Theatre as well as writing, starring, and directing the films Escanaba in da Moonlight and Super Sucker. Daniels's next major film role would be in Clint Eastwood's Blood Work, which received mixed reviews and was a commercial failure. He would rebound later that year with Stephen Daldry's Academy Award-winning The Hours alongside Meryl Streep, Julianne Moore, and Nicole Kidman. The film was also a financial success, grossing well over $100 million. Gods and Generals followed in 2003, as did the action film I Witness, which co-starred James Spader. Daniels then starred in Imaginary Heroes and the 2004 television film adaptation of fellow Michigander and friend Mitch Albom's bestseller The Five People You Meet in Heaven.

The year 2005 proved to be a strong year for Daniels as he garnered notice as the star of the lauded Noah Baumbach film The Squid and the Whale with Laura Linney. Daniels received his third Golden Globe nomination for the film, about a divorcing couple and the effect the split has on their children. That year Daniels also starred in the family film adaptation of Because of Winn-Dixie. He would round out the year with a supporting role in George Clooney's Oscar-nominated film Good Night and Good Luck, starring David Straithairn, Patricia Clarkson, Robert Downey Jr., and Frank Langella. In 2006, Daniels appeared in the Truman Capote biopic Infamous starring Toby Jones, Sandra Bullock, Gwyneth Paltrow, and Sigourney Weaver. The film was compared by critics to Bennett Miller's 2005 film Capote starring Philip Seymour Hoffman, Catherine Keener, and Chris Cooper.

Daniels then starred in Barry Sonnenfeld's family film RV (2006), alongside Robin Williams, as the redneck comic foil to Williams' uptight businessman. Daniels appeared in an Off-Broadway production of David Harrower's Blackbird in 2007 alongside Allison Pill, with whom he would later reunite in Aaron Sorkin's The Newsroom. He also starred in two 2007 independent films, Mama's Boy and The Lookout, for which he was nominated for a Satellite Award, and Traitor (2008) with Don Cheadle.

=== 2009–2015: Resurgence with The Newsroom ===
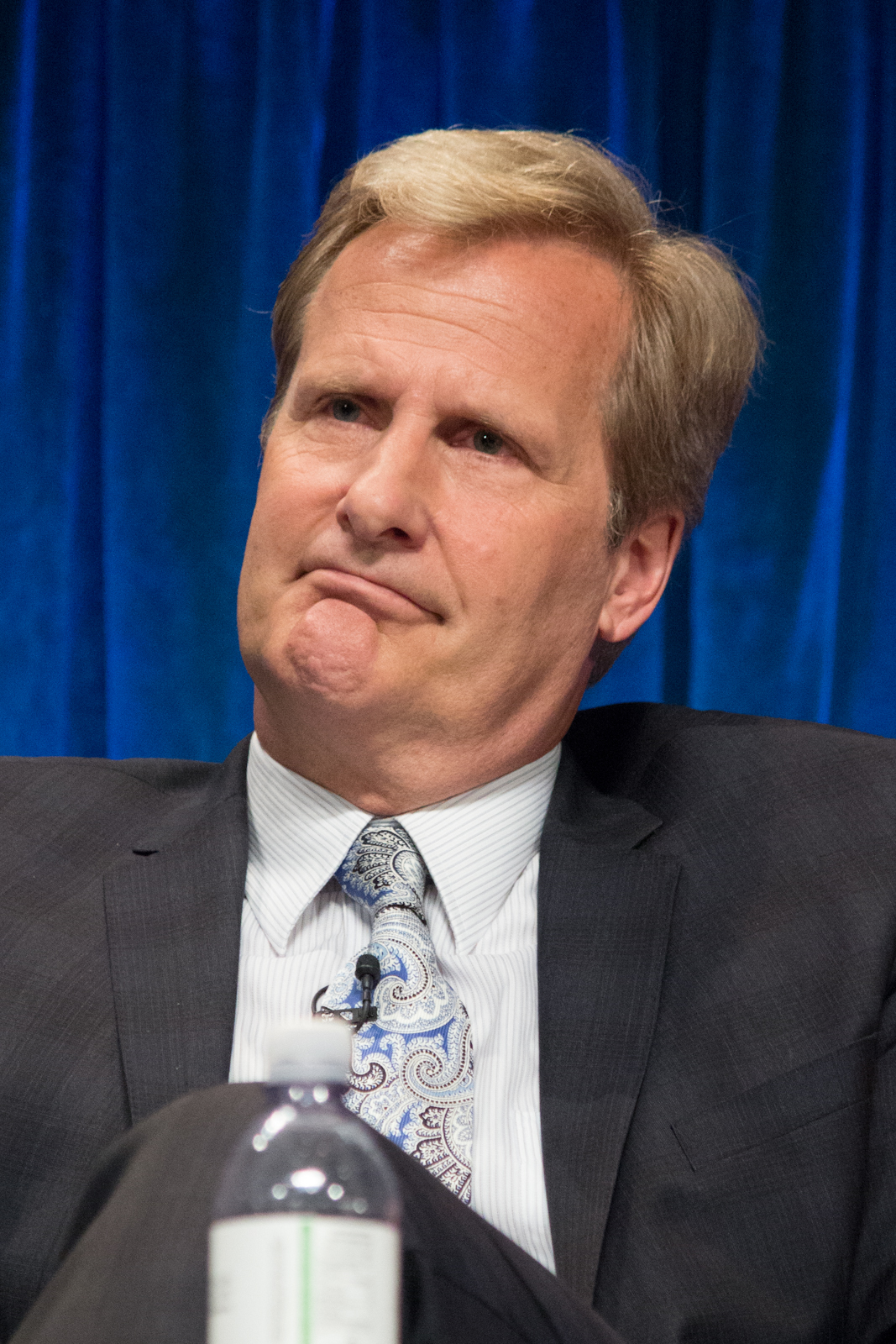
Daniels promoting The Newsroom at the 2013 PaleyFest

In 2009, after a 16-year-long absence, Daniels returned to Broadway in Yasmina Reza's original play God of Carnage alongside Hope Davis, James Gandolfini, and Marcia Gay Harden. The play centers around two sets of parents who agree to meet because of a fight among their respective sons. Their meeting starts out civilized, however, as the evening goes on, the parents become increasingly childish, resulting in the evening's devolving into chaos. The play debuted at The Bernard B. Jacobs Theatre in previews on February 28, 2009, and officially on March 22, 2009. Originally planned for a limited engagement to close July 19, 2009, the run was extended through February 28, 2010, before converting to an open-ended run. Daniels received his first Tony Award nomination, for Tony Award for Best Actor in a Play for his performance. The show won the Tony Award for Best Play. That same year Daniels acted in four indie hit films State of Play, The Answer Man, Away We Go, and Paper Man. In 2010, Daniels continued his theater work and had a starring role in the little-seen indie Howl, alongside James Franco as Allen Ginsberg. Daniels was featured on the cover of the April–May 2011 issue of Guitar Aficionado magazine as well as the July–August 2011 issue of Making Music, where he discussed his experiences with music. In 2012, Daniels became the new announcing voice for Apple with the iPhone 5 ads, and appeared in the sci-fi action film Looper.

Daniels had a career resurgence with his turn in Aaron Sorkin's HBO drama series The Newsroom (2012–2014) as fictional news anchor Will McAvoy. The opening scene of the pilot episode "We Just Decided To", in which Daniels gives a monologue on the state of American greatness, has been viewed more than 23 million times. While the show received mixed reviews, Daniels won the Primetime Emmy Award for Lead Actor in a Drama Series for the first season. The series ran for two more seasons, for which Daniels was nominated for the Primetime Emmy Award. The show also starred Emily Mortimer, John Gallagher Jr., Sam Waterston, Olivia Munn, Alison Pill, Dev Patel, and Jane Fonda. In 2014, he reprised his role as Harry Dunne in Dumb and Dumber To reuniting with Jim Carrey. In 2015, Daniels reunited with Sorkin in the biographical drama film Steve Jobs, portraying CEO John Sculley. Daniels starred alongside Michael Fassbender, and Kate Winslet, both of whom received Academy Award nominations for their performances. The film was directed by Academy Award-winner Danny Boyle and written by Academy Award winner Aaron Sorkin. The film was a critical success earning an 86% on Rotten Tomatoes with the consensus reading, "Like the tech giant co-founded by its subject, Steve Jobs gathers brilliant people to deliver a product whose elegance belies the intricate complexities at its core." Sorkin won the Golden Globe for its screenplay. Also in 2015, he played NASA Administrator Teddy Sanders in Ridley Scott's sci-fi drama film The Martian.

=== 2016–present: Career expansion ===
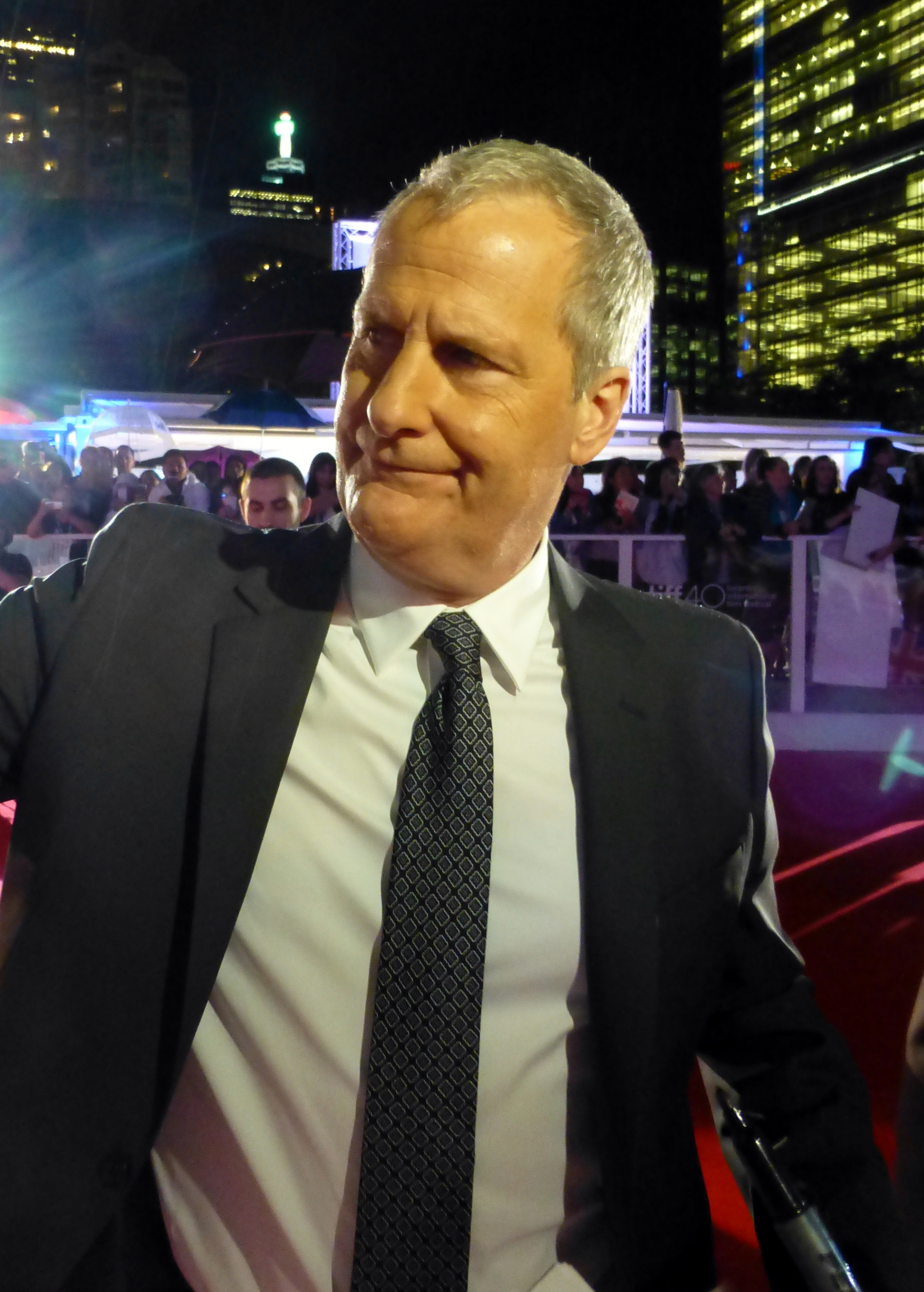
Daniels attending the premiere of The Martian at the 2015 Toronto International Film Festival

In 2016, Daniels returned to Broadway in the Revival of David Harrower's Blackbird alongside Michelle Williams. The play depicts a young woman (Williams) meeting a middle-aged man (Daniels), 15 years after being sexually abused by him when she was twelve. The play ran at the Belasco Theatre on February 5, 2016 (37 previews), and opened officially on March 10 (through June 11, 108 performances) where it was directed by Joe Mantello and received widespread critical acclaim. Daniels was nominated for his second Tony Award for Best Actor in a Play. Williams received a Tony Award nomination as well. Daniels played David in The Divergent Series: Allegiant (2016) and was set to reprise the role in the planned The Divergent Series: Ascendant.

In 2017, Daniels starred in Netflix's western miniseries Godless where he portrayed the villain Frank Griffin. He starred alongside Michelle Dockery, Merritt Wever, and Sam Waterston. Daniels won critical praise for his performance and was nominated for the Primetime Emmy Award for Supporting Actor in a Miniseries, which he won. In 2018, Daniels's Hulu miniseries The Looming Tower traces the rising threat of Osama bin Laden and Al-Qaeda in the late 1990s and how the rivalry between the FBI and CIA during that time may have inadvertently set the path for the tragedy of 9/11. Daniels played John O'Neill, the chief of the New York FBI's Counter-terrorism Center. The ensemble included Bill Camp, Michael Stuhlbarg, and Peter Sarsgaard. Daniels won widespread critical acclaim and received a Primetime Emmy Award nomination for Best Actor in a Limited Series.

In 2018, Daniels starred as Atticus Finch, reuniting with Aaron Sorkin in his stage adaptation of To Kill a Mockingbird. The play opened on Broadway at the Shubert Theatre. The production began previews on November 1, 2018, prior to its official opening on December 13, 2018. During the week ending on December 23, 2018, the production grossed over $1.5 million, breaking the record for box office grosses for a non-musical play in a theater owned by The Shubert Organization. Daniels received his third Tony Award nomination for Best Actor in a Play. The show received 8 other Tony Award nominations. In June 2019, producer Scott Rudin announced that Daniels would leave the production in November 2019 and would be succeeded by Ed Harris. His last performance was on November 3, 2019.

Daniels narrated the History Channel miniseries on George Washington titled Washington (2020). The 3-part documentary series premiered on February 16, 2020. On September 27, 2020, Daniels portrayed FBI director James Comey in the 2-part limited series, The Comey Rule which debuted on Showtime. The project is based on Comey's memoir, A Higher Loyalty (2018), and was written and directed by Billy Ray. The cast included Brendan Gleeson as Donald Trump, Jennifer Ehle as Patrice Comey, Holly Hunter as Sally Yates, and Michael Kelly as Andrew McCabe. Daniels won critical praise for his performance as Comey and received a Golden Globe Award nomination. In 2019, it was announced that Showtime had given a straight-to-series order to American Rust, a drama based on Philipp Meyer’s debut novel of the same name. Daniels was an executive producer on the project and starred alongside Maura Tierney and Bill Camp. In June 2021, it was announced that Daniels would be returning to his role of Atticus Finch in the Broadway production of To Kill a Mockingbird starting in October. Daniels narrated the 9/11 documentary from Apple TV+ entitled 9/11: Inside the President's War Room; it was released on September 1, 2021. In 2026, he made recurring appearances as Jimmy's father in the Apple TV+ show Shrinking, and received positive reviews for his performance as U.S. President Ronald Reagan in the film The Brink of War.

== Political, promotional and nonprofit activities ==
Daniels has appeared as the TV spokesman for the Michigan Economic Development Corporation.

In 2020, Daniels endorsed Joe Biden in the presidential election against Donald Trump. He narrated a campaign ad for Biden titled "America Needs Michigan", focusing on the swing state of Michigan.

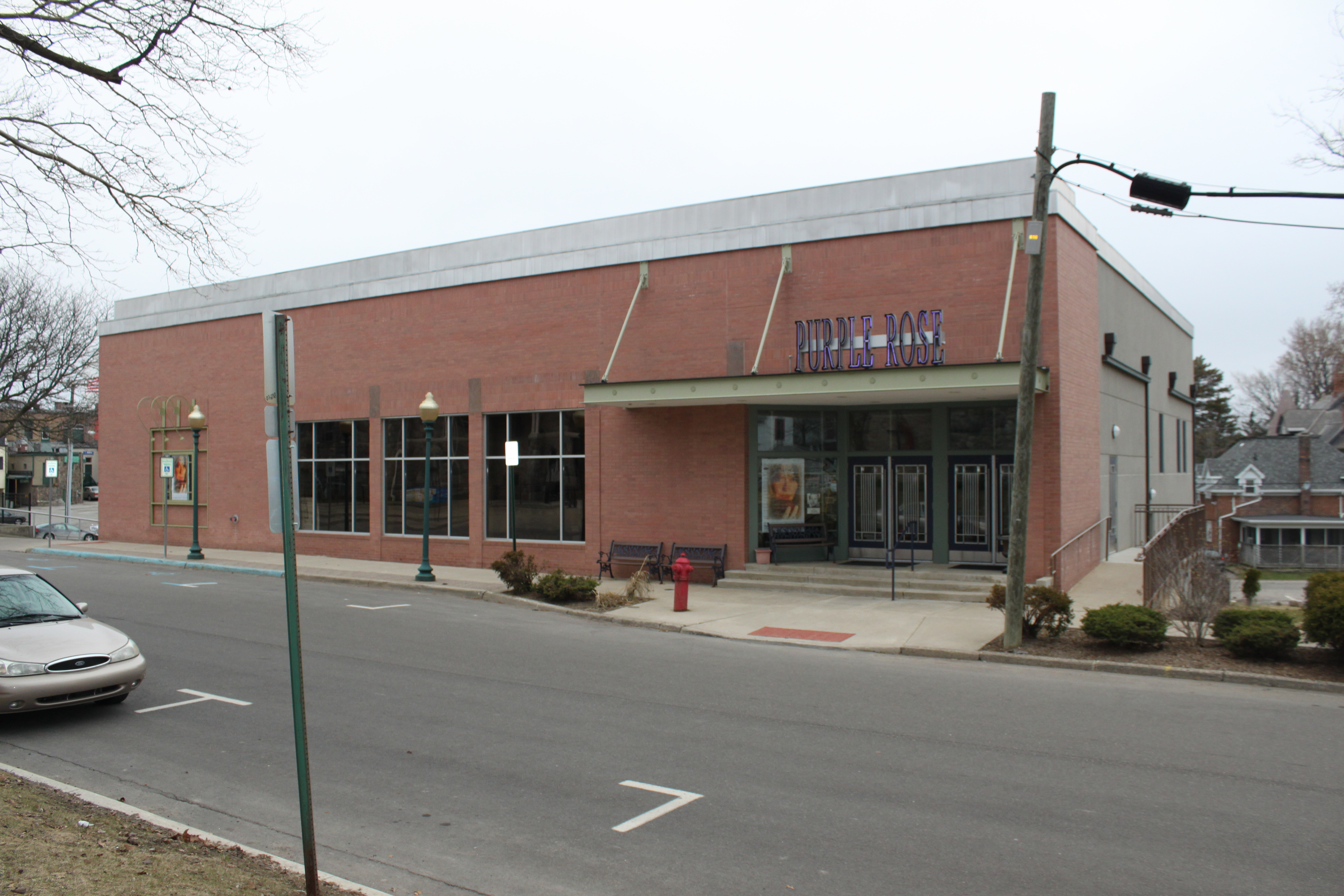
The Purple Rose Theatre

In 1991, Daniels founded the Purple Rose Theatre Company, a nonprofit stage company in Chelsea, Michigan. He has written more than a dozen plays for the company.

== Personal life ==
In 1979, Daniels married his college girlfriend, a fellow Michigan resident also from Chelsea, Kathleen Rosemary Treado. They have three children.

In 1986, he moved back to his hometown of Chelsea, Michigan; as of 2016, he primarily resided there.

== Acting credits ==
=== Film ===
Year	Title	Role	Notes
1981	Ragtime	P.C. O'Donnell	
1983	Terms of Endearment	Flap Horton	
1985	The Purple Rose of Cairo	Tom Baxter / Gil Shepherd	
1985	Marie	Eddie Sisk	
1986	Something Wild	Charles Driggs	
1986	Heartburn	Richard	
1987	Radio Days	Biff Baxter	
1988	The House on Carroll Street	Cochran	
1988	Sweet Hearts Dance	Sam Manners	
1989	Checking Out	Ray Macklin	
1990	Arachnophobia	Dr. Ross Jennings	
1990	Welcome Home, Roxy Carmichael	Denton Webb	
1990	Love Hurts	Paul Weaver	
1991	The Butcher's Wife	Dr. Alex Tremor	
1992	Timescape	Ben Wilson	
1992	There Goes the Neighborhood	Willis Embry	
1993	Rain Without Thunder	Jonathan Garson	
1993	Gettysburg	Colonel Joshua Chamberlain	
1994	Speed	Officer Harry Temple	
1994	Dumb and Dumber	Harry Dunne	
1996	Fly Away Home	Thomas Alden	
1996	2 Days in the Valley	Alvin Strayer	
1996	101 Dalmatians	Roger Dearly	
1997	Trial and Error	Charlie Tuttle	
1998	Pleasantville	Bill Johnson	
1999	My Favorite Martian	Tim O'Hara	
1999	It's the Rage	Warren Harding	
2000	Chasing Sleep	Ed Saxon	
2001	Escanaba in da Moonlight	Reuben Soady	Also co-writer and director
2002	Super Sucker	Fred Barlow	Also co-writer and director
2002	Blood Work	Jasper "Buddy" Noone	
2002	The Hours	Louis Waters	
2003	Gods and Generals	Lieutenant Colonel Joshua Chamberlain	
2003	I Witness	James Rhodes	
2004	Imaginary Heroes	Ben Travis	
2005	The Squid and the Whale	Bernard Berkman	
2005	Because of Winn-Dixie	Mr. Buloni	
2005	Good Night, and Good Luck	Sig Mickelson	
2006	RV	Travis Gornicke	
2006	Infamous	Alvin Dewey	
2007	The Lookout	Lewis	
2007	Mama's Boy	Mert Rosenbloom	
2007	A Plumm Summer	Narrator	
2008	Space Chimps	Zartog	Voice
2008	Traitor	Carter	
2009	State of Play	Representative George Fergus	
2009	The Answer Man	Arlen Faber	
2009	Away We Go	Jerry Farlander	
2009	Paper Man	Richard Dunn	
2010	Howl	Professor David Kirk	
2012	Looper	Abe	
2014	Dumb and Dumber To	Harry Dunne	
2015	Steve Jobs	John Sculley	
2015	The Martian	Teddy Sanders	
2016	The Divergent Series: Allegiant	David	
2018	The Catcher Was a Spy	Bill Donovan	
2019	Guest Artist	Joseph Harris	Also writer and producer
2020	Adam	Mickey	
2023	Bye Bye Barry	Himself	Documentary
2026	The Brink of War	Ronald Reagan	
2027	2034		Post-production
2027	Starman	Ed Watkins	Filming

=== Television ===
Year	Title	Role	Notes
1980	Hawaii Five-O	Neal Forrester	Episode: "The Flight of the Jewels"
1980	A Rumor of War	Chaplain	2 episodes
1980	Breaking Away	College Kid	Episode: "Pilot"
1982	Catalina C-Lab	Rick Guthrie	Television film
1982	American Playhouse	Jed Jenkins	Episode: "The Fifth of July"
1983	An Invasion of Privacy	Francis Ryan	Television film
1988	The Caine Mutiny Court-Martial	Lieutenant Stephen Maryk	Television film
1988	Tanner '88	Park Ranger	Episode: "The Girlfriend Factor"
1989	No Place Like Home	Mike Cooper	Television film
1991	Saturday Night Live	Himself (host)	Episode: "Jeff Daniels/Color Me Badd"
1992	Teamster Boss: The Jackie Presser Story	Tom Noonan	Television film
1993	Frasier	Doug	Voice; Episode: "Here's Looking at You"
1995	Saturday Night Live	Himself (host)	Episode: "Jeff Daniels/Luscious Jackson"
1995	Redwood Curtain	Lyman Fellers	Television film
2000	The Crossing	George Washington	Television film
2000	Cheaters	Dr. Gerard Plecki	Television film
2004	The Goodbye Girl	Elliot Garfield	Television film
2004	The Five People You Meet in Heaven	The Blue Man	Television film
2008	Sweet Nothing in My Ear	Dan Miller	Television film
2012–2014	The Newsroom	Will McAvoy	Main role
2013	Family Guy	Himself	Voice; Episode: "A Fistful of Meg"
2014	The Graham Norton Show	Guest	Episode: "Jim Carrey/Jeff Daniels/Jude Law"
2015	30 for 30	Narrator	Episode: "Of Miracles and Men"
2017	Godless	Frank Griffin	Main role
2018	The Looming Tower	John O'Neill	Main role
2018	The Emperor's Newest Clothes	The Emperor	Voice; television special
2020	Washington	Narrator	3 episodes
2020	The Comey Rule	James Comey	2 episodes
2020	Impractical Jokers	Himself	Episode: "Rock Bottom"
2020	Impractical Jokers: Dinner Party	Himself	Episode: "The Steak and Potatoes Episode"
2021	Hemingway	Ernest Hemingway	Voice; Television documentary
2021	9/11: Inside the President's War Room	Narrator	Television documentary
2021–2024	American Rust	Del Harris	Main role
2024	A Man in Full	Charlie Croker	Main role
2025	The American Revolution	Thomas Jefferson	Voice; TV documentary
2026	Shrinking	Randy Laird	3 episodes

Key
†	Denotes television productions that have not yet been released

=== Theatre ===
Year	Title	Role	Theatre
1976	The Farm	Arthur	Circle Theatre, Off-Broadway
1977	Gemini	Assistant Stage Manager	Little Theatre, Broadway
1977	My Life	Young Eddie	Circle Theatre, Off-Broadway
1978	Lulu	Schwarz / Mr. Hunidei	Circle Theatre, Off-Broadway
1978	Two from the Late Show	Nephew (Brontosaurus)	Circle Theatre, Off-Broadway
1978	Fifth of July	Jed Jenkins	Circle Theatre, Off-Broadway
1980–1982	Fifth of July	Jed Jenkins	New Apollo Theatre, Broadway
1982	Johnny Got His Gun	Joe Bonham	Circle Repertory Theatre, Off-Broadway
1982	Three Sisters	Andrei Sergeevich Prozorov	New York City Center, Off-Broadway
1984	The Golden Age	Tom	Jack Lawrence Theatre, Broadway
1985	Lemon Sky	Alan	McGinn/Cazale Theatre, Off-Broadway
1993	Redwood Curtain	Lyman	Brooks Atkinson Theatre, Broadway
2007	Blackbird	Ray Brooks	New York City Center, Off-Broadway
2009–2010	God of Carnage	Alan / Michael	Bernard B. Jacobs Theatre, Broadway
2016	Blackbird	Ray Brooks	Belasco Theatre, Broadway
2018–2019, 2021	To Kill a Mockingbird	Atticus Finch	Shubert Theatre, Broadway

=== Music videos ===
Year	Artist	Song	Role	Album
1995	Crash Test Dummies featuring Ellen Reid	"The Ballad of Peter Pumpkinhead"	Harry Dunne	Dumb and Dumber: Original Motion Picture Soundtrack

== Discography ==
Daniels has written and recorded six full-length albums with proceeds benefitting The Purple Rose Theater.

- Jeff Daniels Live and Unplugged
- Jeff Daniels Live at The Purple Rose Theatre
- Grandfather's Hat
- Keep It Right Here
- Together Again
- Days Like These

== Awards and nominations ==
Awards received by Jeff Daniels
Award	Year	Category	Title	Result	Ref.
Golden Globe Awards	1986	Best Actor in a Motion Picture – Comedy/Musical	The Purple Rose of Cairo	Nominated	
Golden Globe Awards	1987	Best Actor in a Motion Picture – Comedy/Musical	Something Wild	Nominated	
Golden Globe Awards	2006	Best Actor in a Motion Picture – Comedy/Musical	The Squid and the Whale	Nominated	
Golden Globe Awards	2013	Best Actor in a Television Series – Drama	The Newsroom	Nominated	
Golden Globe Awards	2021	Best Actor – Miniseries or Television Film	The Comey Rule	Nominated	
Primetime Emmy Award	2013	Outstanding Lead Actor in a Drama Series	The Newsroom	Won	
Primetime Emmy Award	2014	Outstanding Lead Actor in a Drama Series	The Newsroom	Nominated	
Primetime Emmy Award	2015	Outstanding Lead Actor in a Drama Series	The Newsroom	Nominated	
Primetime Emmy Award	2018	Outstanding Lead Actor in a Limited Series or Movie	The Looming Tower	Nominated	
Primetime Emmy Award	2018	Outstanding Supporting Actor in a Limited Series or Movie	Godless	Won	
Screen Actors Guild Awards	2002	Outstanding Cast in a Motion Picture	The Hours	Nominated	
Screen Actors Guild Awards	2005	Outstanding Cast in a Motion Picture	Good Night, and Good Luck	Nominated	
Screen Actors Guild Awards	2012	Outstanding Actor in a Drama Series	The Newsroom	Nominated	
Screen Actors Guild Awards	2013	Outstanding Actor in a Drama Series	The Newsroom	Nominated	
Screen Actors Guild Awards	2017	Outstanding Actor in a Miniseries or Television Movie	Godless	Nominated	
Tony Awards	2009	Best Actor in a Play	God of Carnage	Nominated	
Tony Awards	2016	Best Actor in a Play	Blackbird	Nominated	
Tony Awards	2019	Best Actor in a Play	To Kill a Mockingbird	Nominated	

== Other recognitions ==
He was inducted into the Michigan Walk of Fame on May 25, 2006, in Lansing, Michigan.

In December 2009, he was granted an Honorary Doctorate in Fine Arts and was selected to deliver the winter commencement address at the University of Michigan.

In 2022, a nematode parasite that kills tarantulas was named Tarantobelus jeffdanielsi to honor his role in Arachnophobia.
