= Arianna Turturro =

American former actress and comic book writer (born 1990)

- Born: July 25, 1990 (age 36); Los Angeles, California, U.S.
- Education: School of Visual Arts
- Occupations: Actress; editor; comic book writer
- Father: John Turturro

Arianna Turturro (born July 25, 1990) is an American former actress, editor, and comic book writer known for her work on the DC Comics titles such as Poison Ivy, Harley Quinn, Catwoman, and Detective Comics.

== Early life ==
Turturro was born on July 25, 1990, in Los Angeles, California. Between 2008 and 2012, she studied at the School of Visual Arts, graduating in cartooning and illustration.

== Career ==
In 2012, Turturro founded the SVA INK Magazine, a semi-monthly comics magazine run by students, and prior to 2014, she worked as a radio presenter, producer, and DJ at WFMU, an American radio station.

She began working as an assistant editor for DC Comics in 2014, initially working within the Vertigo and Black Label imprints. In 2017, she was promoted to senior editor and in 2022, to associate senior editor. Beyond her work as an editor, she has also worked sporadically as a writer, publishing in titles such as Tis the Season to Be Freezin', as well as a Swamp Thing story published in the anthology DC: The Doomed and the Damned. She also wrote for the one-shot Gotham City Sirens: Uncovered, published by DC Comics and focused on the Gotham City Sirens, in addition to the comic Catwoman: Uncovered, published on August 29, 2023.

In 2025, she began editing the new Red Hood comic book series, written by Gretchen Felker-Martin and illustrated by Jeff Spokes, and aimed at readers over 17 years old. However, the series was canceled by the publisher after the first issue was released due to Felker-Martin's statements about the assassination of Charlie Kirk via the Bluesky platform.

== Awards and recognition ==
Some of the works Turturro has worked on throughout her career have received various awards in the comic book industry. The Poison Ivy series by G. Willow Wilson and Marcio Takara, published in Spanish as Hiedra Venenosa and edited by Turturro, won a GLAAD Media Award. Furthermore, the story Finding Batman, also edited by Turturro and written by Kevin Conroy, the renowned voice actor for Batman, who narrated his struggles as a closeted gay man in the story, won an Eisner Award for Best Short Story.

On March 8, 2024, Panini Comics Spain, part of the Panini Group, highlighted her as one of the various influential women in the world of comics.

== Personal life ==
Arianna Turturro is a trans woman.

== Filmography ==
Year	Title	Role	Notes
1992	Mac	Child	
1997	The Truce	Child in the market	
1998	Illuminata	Child #1	
2001	The Royal Tenenbaums	Young Richie Tenenbaum	
2004	2BPerfectlyHonest	Danny	
2005	Romance & Cigarettes	Friend Fryburg	
