= Pokémon 4Ever =

2001 film by Kunihiko Yuyama

- Theatrical release poster

Japanese name
- Kanji: 劇場版ポケットモンスター セレビィ 時を越えた遭遇(であい)
- Literal meaning: Pocket Monsters the Movie: Celebi - A Timeless Encounter
Transcriptions
- Revised Hepburn: Gekijōban Poketto Monsutā Serebyi Toki o Koeta Deai
- Directed by: Kunihiko Yuyama
- Screenplay by: Hideki Sonoda
- Based on: Pokémon: Johto League Champions by Satoshi Tajiri, & Nintendo
- Produced by: Yukako Matsusako; Takemoto Mori; Choji Yoshikawa
- Starring: Rica Matsumoto; Ikue Ōtani; Mayumi Iizuka; Yūji Ueda; Satomi Kōrogi; Megumi Hayashibara; Shin-ichiro Miki; Inuko Inuyama; Unshō Ishizuka; Shirō Sano; Takashi Fujii; Anne Suzuki; Kumiko Endō
- Cinematography: Hisao Shirai
- Edited by: Toshio Henmi
- Music by: Shinji Miyazaki
- Production company: OLM, Inc.
- Distributed by: Toho
- Release date: July 7, 2001 (Japan)
- Running time: 75 minutes
- Country: Japan
- Language: Japanese
- Box office: $40.8 million

Pokémon 4Ever (Note: Originally released in Japan as Pocket Monsters the Movie: Celebi - A Timeless Encounter (劇場版ポケットモンスター セレビィ 時を越えた遭遇(であい), Gekijōban Poketto Monsutā Serebyi Toki o Koeta Deai; lit. 'Celebi: The Meeting that Traversed Time')) is a 2001 Japanese anime film directed by Kunihiko Yuyama and based on the television series Pokémon. The fourth official Pokémon film, it was released in Japan on July 7, 2001. The film was directed in Japan by Kunihiko Yuyama and written by Hideki Sonoda. It stars Rica Matsumoto, Ikue Ōtani, Mayumi Iizuka, Yūji Ueda, Satomi Kōrogi, Megumi Hayashibara, Shin-ichiro Miki, Inuko Inuyama, Unshō Ishizuka, Shirō Sano, Takashi Fujii, and Anne Suzuki.

The English adaptation of the film was released on October 11, 2002, in the United States, produced by 4Kids Entertainment and distributed by then-Disney subsidiary Miramax Films, which would take over from Warner Bros. starting with this film. The English dub was directed by Jim Malone, and written by Norman J. Grossfeld. The English adaptation stars the regular television cast: Veronica Taylor, Eric Stuart, Rachael Lillis and Maddie Blaustein.

== Plot ==
In a forest in the Johto region, a young Pokémon Trainer named Sammy is warned by a woman named Towa to be wary of the "Voice of the Forest", which is Celebi, a Mythical Pokémon capable of time travel. Celebi is pursued by a Pokémon Hunter and is injured. Sammy protects it from the hunter, but Celebi uses its powers to travel forward in time, taking Sammy with it. Forty years later, the elderly hunter is confronted by the Iron Masked Marauder, a cruel and sinister member of Team Rocket, who seeks to enslave Celebi. The Marauder possesses Dark Balls, a unique Pokéball that can capture Pokémon already owned by Trainers, turns them evil, and increases their power to the highest level, and demonstrates it by capturing the hunter's Tyranitar, and ordering it to use its Hyper Beam to destroy most of the hunter's possessions.

Meanwhile, Ash Ketchum, Misty, and Brock arrive in the neighborhood of Arborville, spotting the legendary Suicune on a riverbank. Speaking to Professor Oak, the trio learn he encountered Suicune himself many years ago, but they have to depart before he can explain how. The group are taken to the forest by a local named Mr. White, but encounter the elderly Towa and her granddaughter Diana, and are warned of the Voice of the Forest. Celebi and Sammy appear from the past, but the former hides, while Sammy comes to terms with his time displacement. Ash, Sammy, Misty, and Brock find the wounded Celebi and decide to take him to the Lake of Life, said to have healing waters.

Team Rocket pursue the children, joining forces with the Marauder. The children are guided to the lake by wild Pokémon, where Celebi is healed. That night, Ash and Sammy bond, both hoping the latter can return to his era. The next day, the Marauder confronts the group, using a Dark Ball to capture Celebi and uses its immense powers over nature to encase it in an enormous draconian-like armor made from the forest. After Jessie is captured, the Marauder admits he plans to use Celebi to overthrow Giovanni as leader of Team Rocket and take over the world himself. Ash, his friends, and Suicune battle to rescue Celebi from the Marauder's influence.

Ash, Sammy, and Pikachu breach Celebi's armor and convince it to resist the Marauder, regaining his memories and is freed from the Dark Ball's influence. The Marauder and Jessie tumble in the lake as Celebi's armour collapses. However, upon taking Celebi to the lakeside, it dies in Sammy's arms. The group attempt to revive it when Suicune purifies the lake, but it fails. Just as all hope of reviving Celebi is lost, the Voice of the Forest, which is actually each Celebi from across time, materializes in the sky and magically resurrects their fellow Time Travel Pokémon. Suddenly, the Marauder re-appears and tries to kidnaps Celebi again by using a jetpack to escape, but Ash and Pikachu rescue Celebi; the Marauder then crashes into the forest and is confronted by Towa, Diana, White, and the angry wild Pokémon.

Celebi takes Sammy back to his own time, who promises to reunite with Ash in the future. Ash, Misty, and Brock speak to Professor Oak of their adventure. Ash saddened by Sammy's departure, however, Oak reassures him that friendships can withstand the test of time and he and Sammy will remain friends. Upon ending the call, the trio are perplexed about how Professor Oak knew Sammy's name, having never mentioned it. In his laboratory, Oak looks through his sketchbook, revealing that he is Sammy. Later, Tracey Sketchit discovers Oak's sketchbook and inserts it into a bookshelf for safekeeping, and Jessie reunites with James and Meowth on the lake.

== Cast ==
Character	Japanese	English
Ash Ketchum	Rica Matsumoto	Veronica Taylor
Pikachu	Ikue Ōtani	Ikue Ōtani
Misty	Mayumi Iizuka	Rachael Lillis
Brock	Yuuji Ueda	Eric Stuart
Togepi	Satomi Kōrogi	Satomi Kōrogi
Jessie	Megumi Hayashibara	Rachael Lillis
James	Shinichirou Miki	Eric Stuart
Meowth	Inuko Inuyama	Maddie Blaustein
Bayleef	Mika Kanai	Mika Kanai
Sammy	Keiko Toda	Tara Sands
Diana	Anne Suzuki	Roxanne Beck
Towa	Mami Koyama	Veronica Taylor; Kerry Williams (young)
Iron Masked Marauder	Shirō Sano	Dan Green
Scizor	Katsuyuki Konishi	Eric Stuart
Sneasel	Yumi Tōma	Kayzie Rogers
Celebi	Kazuko Sugiyama	Kazuko Sugiyama
Suicune	Masahiko Tanaka	Masahiko Tanaka
White	Takashi Fujii	Marc Thompson
Hunter	Kouichi Yamadera	Eric Stuart
Hunter's Scyther	Koichi Sakaguchi	Eric Stuart
Hunter's Houndoom	Tomoyuki Kōno	
Ursaring	Hisao Egawa	
Furret	Akiko Suzuki	
Teddiursa	Ryouka Yuzuki	Tara Jayne
Stantler	Shinichi Namiki	
Oddish	Kaori Tsuji	Kayzie Rogers
Croconaw	Masaru Motegi	Eric Stuart
Professor Oak	Unshō Ishizuka	Stuart Zagnit
Tracey Sketchit	Tomokazu Seki	
Narrator	Unshō Ishizuka	Rodger Parsons

== Production ==
The movie was directed by Kunihiko Yuyama and written by Hideki Sonoda. Norman Grossfeld, the producer of the English adaptation, said that the animation quality in the film was the "finest yet" from Oriental Light and Magic. The animators felt "tremendous pressure" that their adaptation, both in the writing and the casting, held up against "this incredible achievement". Grossfeld says they adjusted the casting so that the guest characters did not sound too "cartoony" – "and instead had a larger than life tone to fit in with the epic nature of this story and the craftsmanship of the animation". Jim Malone directed the English dub that was written by Michael Haigney.

== Reception ==
=== Box office ===
The first three Pokémon films, Pokémon: The First Movie, Pokémon: The Movie 2000, and Pokémon 3: The Movie, were released outside of Japan by Warner Bros., but the distribution rights for Pokémon 4Ever and Pokémon Heroes were given to Miramax on April 2, 2002, by The Pokémon Company. Miramax was rumored to have bought the rights for $1 million and by giving up 75% of the profits. Harvey Weinstein stated that Miramax could "reinvigorate the franchise" and that Pokémon 4Ever would be released in October.

Pokémon 4Ever was successful in Japan, where it grossed US$39 million. The revenue of the films in the United States had fallen from $85.7 million for the first movie to $17 million for the third movie. In the United States, the film had a limited release, opening in only 249 theaters. Comparatively, the previous film had opened in 2,675 theaters. It earned $717,061 in its opening weekend, ranking #18 on the box office for that weekend. The film earned a total of $1,727,447 during its run in North America. The film had a 58-day theatrical run, ending on December 5, 2002. Much like the next film, it was more successful upon its release on video and DVD.

The film also grossed $79,642 in the Netherlands, bringing its overseas gross to US$1,807,089. The film's total worldwide gross was US$40,807,089 (equivalent to $74,198,193 in 2025).

=== Reception ===
"There have been so many Pokémon movies by now that the beginning of Pokémon 4Ever does have the air of a mass-produced product. And yet, to be fair, somewhere in the middle of the rather predictable storytelling there are flashes of charm. The start [of the film] is highly disappointing, as the first 20 or so minutes are a confusing and lazily put-together mishmash. Still, there are some reasonably pleasing sequences midway through the film when it revels in some of the more pleasant aspects of the forest - its lake of life, for example - and some of the animation actually becomes a little creative".

— Richard Duckett, Worcester Telegram & Gazette.

Pokémon 4Ever received generally negative reviews from television critics. Some critics called it "predictable" and "disappointing", while others stated that "the viewers won't be disappointed". The film received a 16% rating on Rotten Tomatoes, based on 38 reviews, the lowest of the Pokémon film series (original), with the consensus reading, "Only for diehard Pokemon fans". It received a rating of 25 out of 100 (signifying "generally unfavorable" reviews) on Metacritic from 16 reviews. In a review of the film, Dann Gire of the Daily Herald said that "nothing feels more desperate than a movie that tries to extort emotions from young viewers. That happens in the animated Pokémon 4Ever, in which colorful characters stand around crying over the shriveling corpse of a magical creature called Celebi. The movie has emotional warmth of tin foil, mainly because it never establishes connections among the characters, or between the characters and viewers".

Tenley Woodman of the Boston Herald said that "Fans 4Ever would be a more appropriate title for the film because Pokémon enthusiasts likely will be the only ones satisfied by the fourth big-screen installment of this Japanimation craze". He added that "the story line is solid, with Pokémon's proxy-fighter premise pieced together for first-time viewers. However, the film lacks the spark needed to make it a must-see flick". Robert Koehler of Variety said that the "script by Hideki Sonoda is thin in terms of levels of action and adventure, and suffers from last minute padding with one ostensible ending following another. A clever notion to pop up in the larger Pokémon epic, however, is the suggestion that The Professor (the Pokémon trainers' long-term, reliable guide to all things Pokémon) is actually Sam, now grown up in the present". He then added: "Yank voices – holdovers all from the past films – remain as irritating and overly emphatic as ever". Tasha Robinson of The A.V. Club criticized the movie's pacing stating that "In the concrete, though, it's deadly dull. There's no point to prolonging the inevitable, except to pad the movie out to its barely feature-length run time". Lawrence Van Gelder of The New York Times stated that when "it comes to entertainment, children deserve better".

Loren King of the Chicago Tribune gave the film a generally positive review, saying: "The latest installment in the Pokémon canon is surprising less moldy and trite than the last two, likely because much of the Japanese anime is set in a scenic forest where Pokémon graze in peace. The backdrop provides a welcome respite from the ear-, eye- and mind-numbing Pokémon action. And the time-travel plot, though less than inspired, is still tolerable enough for adults accompanying kids". He added that "like most Pokémon tales, this one offers lots of exposition and clunky dialogue, but also counters the expected mayhem with a sweet-sided story about friendship and peaceful creatures who prefer to live far from the madding crowd". Angel Cohn of TV Guide said in his review that "the story is a bit predictable and the characters given to restating the obvious (presumably for the benefit of very young viewers), but overall this third Pokémon sequel is surprisingly entertaining, and a mystery surrounding Sammy's identity provides an interesting twist. The film's flat, traditional anime aesthetic is perfectly suited to the look of the bold, cartoon-like creatures, though the animators switch to a more CGI-influenced look for portions of the final battle sequence. While well done, these scenes feel jarring and out of sync with the rest of the film. Quibbles aside, children and adults enamored of all things Pokémon won't be disappointed".

== Home media ==
=== North America ===
In the United States, Miramax released the film on DVD and VHS in 2003. In 2010, Disney sold off Miramax, which they had owned since 1993, with private equity firm Filmyard Holdings taking over the company and its libraries in 2010. In 2011, Filmyard Holdings licensed the home media rights for various Miramax titles to Echo Bridge Home Entertainment and Lionsgate Films. On March 3, 2015, Lionsgate Home Entertainment released a 4-pack DVD set, which included the three other Pokémon films Miramax held the American rights to (Pokémon Heroes, Pokémon: Jirachi, Wish Maker and Pokémon: Destiny Deoxys). A 2012 Blu-ray version of this release by Echo Bridge also exists. During March 2016, it was announced that Qatari company beIN Media Group had purchased Miramax from Filmyard Holdings. In April 2020, Paramount Global bought a 49% stake in Miramax from beIN, which gave them the rights to the Miramax catalog. Their home video arm Paramount Home Entertainment subsequently began reissuing many Miramax titles, and on September 22, 2020, Pokémon 4Ever was reissued on DVD by Paramount Home Entertainment.

== See also ==
- List of films based on video games
