= Kitty Kane =

Kitty Kane may refer to:

- Kitty Kane, a character played by Sheree North in the 1956 film The Best Things in Life Are Free
- Kitty Kane Murder, a character played by Susan Sarandon in the 2005 film Romance & Cigarettes
