= Harry Bugin =

American actor and musician

- Born: March 10, 1929; The Bronx, New York City, U.S.
- Died: October 6, 2005 (aged 76); Jackson Heights, Queens, New York, U.S.
- Occupation: Actor / Musician
- Years active: 1947–2005

Harry Bugin (March 10, 1929 – October 6, 2005) was an American film, stage and television actor and musician.

== Life and career ==
Born in the Bronx, New York City, the son of Isidore and Sadie Bugin, and brother to Ruth Bugin, he was a graduate of the New York Public School system and a graduate of the American Academy of Dramatic Arts in New York City. Bugin played a number of musical instruments including the bass, guitar, tuba, and others. In 1957 he married the former Aphrodite Manickas of Pawtucket, RI in New York City, at which time Mrs. Bugin began a career in advertising spanning 30 years. They resided in Jackson Heights, NY until his death.

In addition to a long and accomplished film career, Harry Bugin was also a professional musician (string bass, bass guitar) with top "Big Bands" from 1947–1970, including: Glenn Miller (with Ray McKinley) on the 1960s, Tex Beneke (1956/57), Ray McKinley (1960s), Vaughn Monroe (1960s), Sammy Kaye (1960s). Harry Bugin's stage credits include 1974's Twigs (with Vivian Blaine), and 12 Angry Men.

== Partial filmography ==
- The Man Who Saw Tomorrow (1981) - Warlord's Aide
- The Last American Virgin (1982) - Doctor
- The Day After (1983, TV Movie) - Man at phone (uncredited)
- Pennies From Heaven (1984) - Dancer
- Going Under Cover (1985) - Harry Hargreaves
- America's Most Wanted (1989, TV Series) - Aniello Dellacroce
- Miller's Crossing (1990) - Rooster (gangster)
- Barton Fink (1991) - Pete
- Mac (1992) - Patient
- Night of the City (1993) - Fight Promoter
- For Love or Money (1993) - Joey Pickles
- The Hudsucker Proxy (1994) - Aloysius
- City Hall (1996) - Morty the Waiter
- Sudden Manhattan (1997) - Gran'pa Pete
- Destination Anywhere (1997, Video) - Bartender
- The Big Lebowski (1998) - Arthur Digby Sellers
- Joe Gould's Secret (2000) - Newsman
- Game 6 (2005) - Dodgie (final film role)

== Music ==
Bugin performed with people such:

- Glenn Miller
- Ray McKinley (1960s)
- Tex Beneke (1956/57)
- Ray McKinley (1960s)
- Vaughn Monroe (1960s)
- Sammy Kaye (1960s)

== Theatre ==
- Twigs 1974 - Swede (National Tour)
- 12 Angry Men - Juror # 10 - Rita Hayworth Theatre
