= Matthew Sussman =

American actor

- Other name: Nathan Price
- Occupations: Actor; photographer; documentary filmmaker
- Years active: 1990–present
- Website: www.matthewsussman.com

Matthew Sussman, also known as Nathan Price, is an American actor, photographer and documentary filmmaker.

== Early life ==
Sussman graduated from Brown University and was trained at the Yale School of Drama.

== Career ==
Sussman has appeared in numerous films, including Kate & Leopold and Pollock, in which he played the artist Reuben Kadish. Sussman also appeared in three episodes of The Sopranos in 2000 and 2002 as Dr. Douglas Schreck. Other films include John Turturro's Mac and Illuminata. His television work includes appearances in Sex and the City, Law & Order, and the short-lived Peter Berg series Wonderland.

On the New York stage Sussman appeared in MCC Theater's premiere of Tim Blake Nelson's The Grey Zone, directed by Doug Hughes. He was also a member of the original Broadway company of Angels in America, and the U.S. premiere of Shopping and Fucking with Philip Seymour Hoffman and Justin Theroux. He also had major roles at the Seattle Repertory Theatre, Portland Stage, and Steppenwolf Theater in Chicago.

He worked as a voice actor on many anime dubs, primarily for 4Kids Entertainment. He was the original voice of Meowth in Pokémon as well as creating the voice of Slowking in Pokémon the Movie 2000 . Sussman portrayed Meowth and various other characters for 31 episodes before leaving the role due to receiving a promising stage play opportunity and not being able to record remotely. When he returned, Sussman stated that the producers indicated that they did not want to confuse viewers by switching back from the actor who replaced him, though he felt that it was just for convenience's sake. He was replaced by Maddie Blaustein for the rest of the 4Kids era. He also voiced Gravos and King Moros in Slayers Next.

In 2007, he directed the documentary feature film Who is Norman Lloyd, which premiered at the 2007 Telluride Film Festival followed by a run at New York's Film Forum. He was the associate producer and narrator of World Wedding, on TLC and Discovery International.

Sussman was, until recently, also the Senior Director, Digital Presence, at The New School in New York working in Marketing and Communication.

== Filmography ==
=== Film ===
- Men of Respect (1990) - Gunman
- Brain Donors (1992) - Cop
- Mac (1992) - Clarence
- Insomnia (1994) -
- States of Control (1997) - Darcy's Husband
- The Peacemaker (1997) - National Guard Captain
- Illuminata (1998) - Piero
- Pollock (2000) - Reuben Kadish
- Just Visiting (2001) - Chic Salesnan
- Kate & Leopold (2001) - Ad Executive Phil
- 13 Moons (2002) - Doctor Monroe

=== Television ===
- Law & Order (1993–2001) - Dr. Jerome Raleigh, Attorney, Alan Fischer
- New York News (1995) - Todd
- New York Undercover (1996) - Larry Rabinowitz
- The Irresponsible Captain Tylor (1993) - Wang (voice)
- Harlock Saga (1999) - Yattran (voice)
- Sex and the City (1998) - Wall Street Man
- Now and Again (2000) - Ross
- Wonderland (2000) - Emanuel Treyhill
- The Sopranos (2000–2002) - Dr. Schreck
- Law & Order: Criminal Intent (2002) - David Cantler
- Law & Order: Special Victims Unit (2004) - Lawrence Alcott

=== Anime ===
- The Slayers (1999–2001) - Kanzel, Halcyform, Ashford, King Monos, Additional voices
- Pokémon (1998) - Meowth (Season 1; 31 episodes), Additional voices
- Pokémon: The Movie 2000 (2000) - Slowking
- Harlock Saga (2000) - Yattra
- Irresponsible Captain Tylor (2000) - Mickey Cryburm, Prime Minister Naku RA Wang
