= Michael Badalucco =

American actor (born 1954)

- Born: December 20, 1954 (age 71); Brooklyn, New York City, New York, U.S.
- Other name: Mike Badalucco
- Education: Xaverian High School; State University of New York at New Paltz
- Occupation: Actor
- Years active: 1980–present
- Spouse: Brenda Heyob (m. 1996)
- Relatives: Joseph Badalucco Jr. (brother)

Michael Badalucco (born December 20, 1954) is an American actor. He made his screen debut in the film Raging Bull (1980) and subsequently appeared in many films such as Desperately Seeking Susan (1985), Miller's Crossing (1990), Jungle Fever (1991), Mac (1992), Léon: The Professional (1994), Summer of Sam (1999), O Brother, Where Art Thou? (2000), The Man Who Wasn't There (2001), and Teenage Mutant Ninja Turtles: Mutant Mayhem (2023). His breakthrough role came as attorney Jimmy Berluti in the television series The Practice (1997–2004), for which he won a Primetime Emmy Award in 1999.

== Life and career ==
Badalucco, an Italian American, was born in Flatbush, Brooklyn, New York, the son of Jean, a homemaker, and Joe Badalucco, a set dresser, movie set carpenter and property person. His brother is actor Joseph Badalucco Jr., whose most notable role was Jimmy Altieri in the television series The Sopranos.

He attended Xaverian High School in Brooklyn, graduating in 1972. He was the guest speaker at the 2005 commencement. He later attended SUNY New Paltz in New Paltz, New York. Badalucco has been married to Brenda Heyob since 1996.

== Filmography ==
=== Film ===
Year	Title	Role	Notes
1980	Raging Bull	Soda Fountain Clerk	
1984	Broadway Danny Rose	Money Ripper	
1985	Desperately Seeking Susan	Guy From Brooklyn	
1990	Men of Respect	Sal	
1990	Miller's Crossing	Sal, Caspar's Driver	
1991	The Hard Way	Pizza Man	
1991	Switch	Hard Hat	
1991	Jungle Fever	Frankie Botz	
1992	Juice	Detective Kelly	
1992	Mac	Vic Vitelli	
1992	Night and the City	Elaine's Bartender	
1993	Sleepless in Seattle	New York Taxi Driver	
1993	The Saint of Fort Washington	Bridge Cop #2	
1994	Men Lie	Unknown	
1994	Léon: The Professional	Mathilda's Father	
1994	The Search for One-eye Jimmy	Joe Head	
1994	Mixed Nuts	AAA Driver	
1995	The Sunshine Boys	Sound Man	Television movie
1995	Dearly Beloved	Mr. Richards	
1995	Blue in the Face	Statistician	
1995	Clockers	Cop #1	
1996	Two If by Sea	Quinn	
1996	Paulie	Paulie	Short film
1996	Basquiat	Counterman At Deli	
1996	One Fine Day	Lieutenant Bonomo	
1997	Love Walked In	Eddie Bianco	
1997	Commandments	Detective	
1997	Path to Paradise	State Trooper	Television movie
1997	The Deli	Eric, The Soda Man	
1997	Lesser Prophets	Charlie	
1998	You've Got Mail	Charlie	
1999	Summer of Sam	Son of Sam	
2000	It's a Shame About Ray	Mr. Seinfeld	
2000	O Brother, Where Art Thou?	George "Baby Face" Nelson	
2001	The Man Who Wasn't There	Frank	
2002	13 Moons	Producer	
2002	Naked Movie	Joe Head	
2004	2BPerfectlyHonest	Eugene	
2004	Gourmet Club	Chef Orsino Mangiacavallo	Television movie
2005	Bewitched	Joey 'Props'	
2005	Pizza My Heart	Lou Prestolani	Television movie
2006	Broken Circle	Mitchell Stevens	
2007	Joulutarina	Emil	
2009	Nowhere to Hide	Paulo Farina	
2009	The Deported	Store Patron	
2009	In My Sleep	Derek	
2010	Finding Hope Now	Roger Minassian	
2013	Fading Gigolo	Burly Driver	
2014	Zarra's Law	Arthur Pascano	
2015	Dancer and the Dame	Harrier	
2016	Rules Don't Apply	Solly, The Barber	
2019	The Jesus Rolls	Security Guard	
2023	Teenage Mutant Ninja Turtles: Mutant Mayhem	Bad Bernie	Voice

=== Television ===
Year	Title	Role	Notes
1993	Law & Order	David Zifrin	Episode: "Jurisdiction"
1995	Central Park West	Salesman	Episode: "The Best, False Friend"
1995	New York News	Street Vendor	Episode: "Forgotten"
1997–2004	The Practice	Jimmy Berlutti	166 episodes
1999	Ally McBeal	Jimmy Berlutti	Episode: "I Know Him By Heart"
2001	Boston Public	Jimmy Berlutti	Episode: "Chapter Thirteen"
2001	Gideon's Crossing	Jimmy Berlutti	Episode: "Flashpoint"
2005	Joan of Arcadia	Father Payne	Episode: "Common Thread"
2006	Justice	Frank LaRusa	Episode: "Addicts"
2008–14	Bones	Scott Starret	2 episodes
2008	Law & Order: Special Victims Unit	Tom Galli	Episode: "Babes"
2008	Monk	Owen McCloskey	Episode: "Mr. Monk and the Miracle"
2010	Cold Case	Don Bardwill	Episode: "Bombers"
2010	In Plain Sight	Benny Cusato	Episode: "Death Becomes Her"
2010	Private Practice	Nick	Episode: "What Happens Next"
2010	The Young and the Restless	Mark Hogan	8 episodes
2010	Boardwalk Empire	Harry Prince	2 episodes
2011	The Confession	Arty	2 episodes
2011	Chaos	Fred Farmer	3 episodes
2014	Lilyhammer	Joey Salmone	2 episodes
2015	Blue Bloods	Ronnie Russo	Episode: "Cursed"
2020, 2022	Never Have I Ever	Howard Gross	4 episodes
2024	Tales of the Teenage Mutant Ninja Turtles	Bad Bernie	Voice; 2 episodes

== Awards and nominations ==
Year	Award	Category	Work	Result
1998	Viewers for Quality Television	Best Supporting Actor in a Quality Drama Series	The Practice	Nominated
1999	Primetime Emmy Award	Outstanding Supporting Actor in a Drama Series	The Practice	Won
1999	Screen Actors Guild Award	Outstanding Performance by an Ensemble in a Drama Series	The Practice	Nominated
1999	Viewers for Quality Television	Best Supporting Actor in a Quality Drama Series	The Practice	Nominated
2000	Primetime Emmy Award	Outstanding Supporting Actor in a Drama Series	The Practice	Nominated
2000	Screen Actors Guild Award	Outstanding Performance by an Ensemble in a Drama Series	The Practice	Nominated
2000	Viewers for Quality Television	Best Supporting Actor in a Quality Drama Series	The Practice	Nominated
2001	Screen Actors Guild Award	Outstanding Performance by an Ensemble in a Drama Series	The Practice	Nominated
