= Tomoyuki Kōno =

Japanese voice actor

Tomoyuki Kōno (河野 智之, Kōno Tomoyuki, born October 19, 1971 in Tokyo, Japan) is a Japanese voice actor who currently works for 81 Produce.

== Anime voice roles ==
- Naruto - Kotetsu Hagane
- Noir - Chu, Lune, and Vanel
- Pokémon 4Ever - Houndoom
- Rockman EXE - MagnetMan
- Rockman EXE Axess - MagnetMan
- Rockman EXE Stream - MagnetMan
- Saiyuki - Akatsuki, Ascetic Egan, Demon 2 (ep 1), Green Demon, Immortal, and Meihou's Father
- Saiyuki Reload - Thief (ep. 13)
- Un-Go - Ittō Ono

== Video games ==
- Chaos Rings (The Agent)

== Dubbing ==
- Jay and Silent Bob Strike Back (Jason Biggs)
