= Aida Turturro =

American actress (born 1962)

- Turturro in 2026
- Born: September 25, 1962 (age 64); New York City, U.S.
- Education: State University of New York at New Paltz (BA)
- Occupation: Actress
- Years active: 1989–present
- Relatives: John Turturro (cousin); Nicholas Turturro (cousin)

Aida Turturro (born September 25, 1962) is an American actress. Her career spans nearly forty years in film, television, and theatre, including recurring roles on Law & Order: Special Victims Unit and The Blacklist. She is best known for her portrayal of Janice Soprano on the HBO drama series The Sopranos. She is active as a spokesperson for medical disorders, including diabetes and rheumatoid arthritis.

== Early life ==
Turturro was born in New York City on September 25, 1962.

She attended SUNY New Paltz, paying her tuition by cleaning houses.

== Career ==
Turturro made her film debut as Grace in the 1989 comedy film True Love. She played several small roles in the films What About Bob? and Jersey Girl before making her Broadway debut as Eunice Hubbell in the 1992 revival of A Streetcar Named Desire, starring Jessica Lange and Alec Baldwin.

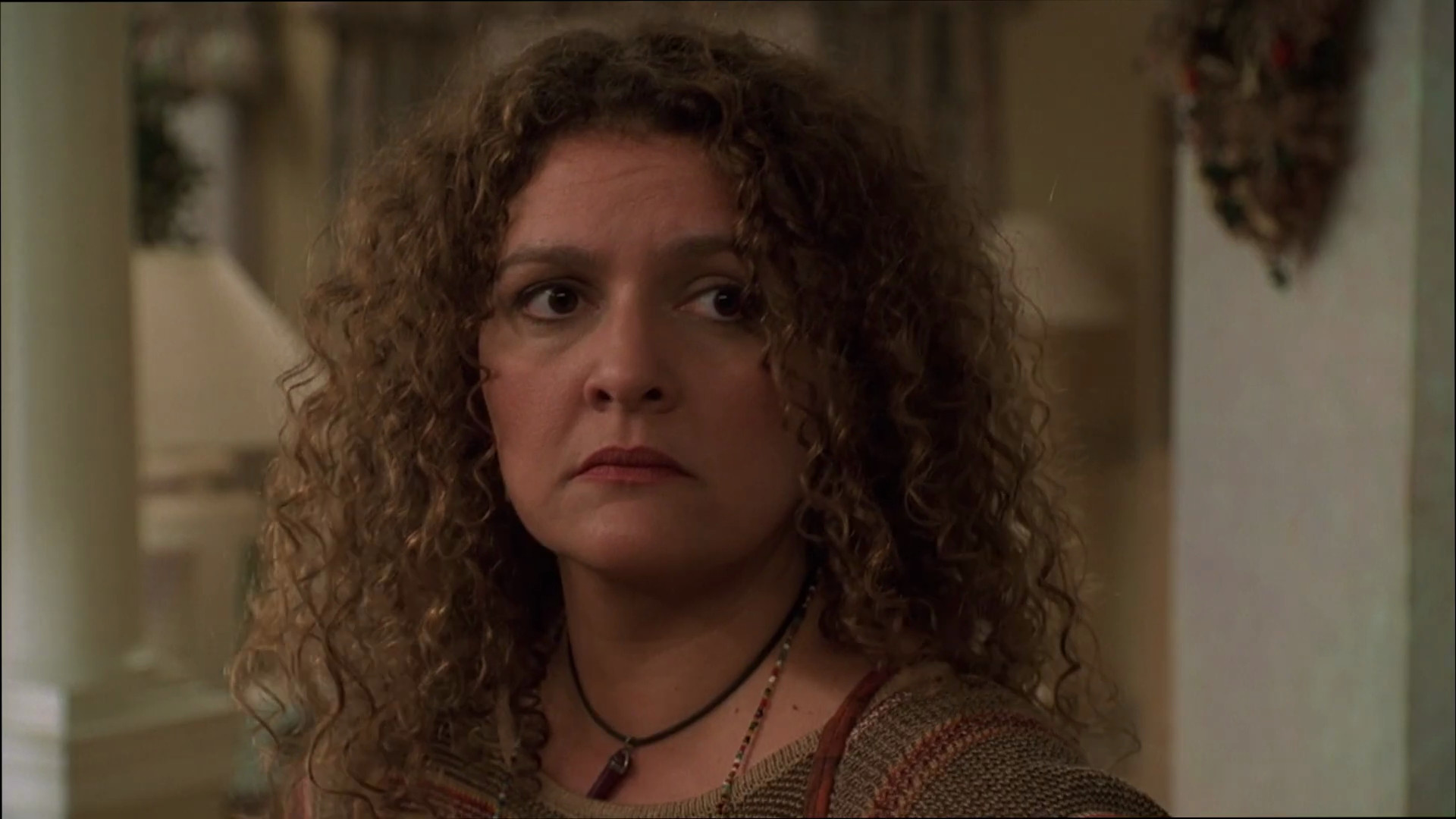
Turturro as Janice Soprano in The Sopranos

Turturro achieved her breakthrough role as Janice Soprano in The Sopranos. From 2000 to 2007, Turturro appeared in 72 episodes across 6 seasons. She gained critical acclaim for her role in the earned two nominations for the Primetime Emmy Award for Outstanding Supporting Actress in a Drama Series in 2001 and 2007.

Following the end of The Sopranos, Turturro made her debut in Broadway musicals as Mama Morton, the prison matron in Chicago.

In 2009, Turturro returned to television, appearing in "Bite Me", a sixth-season episode of the NBC series Medium, playing Bobbi Catalano. Turturro also appeared in the eighth-season episode "Car Periscope" of Curb Your Enthusiasm.

In 2012, Turturro appeared in "Day of the Iguana", an episode of Nurse Jackie, which reunited her with her Sopranos co-star Edie Falco. She played Laura Vargas, the titular character's lawyer.

In 2013, Turturro appeared in the fourth-season episode "Drawing Dead" of Blue Bloods. The same year, she guest starred in several episodes of season 14 of Law & Order: Special Victims Unit as Judge Felicia Catano. As of 2026, she has been brought back in either a guest and recurring capacity for nearly every season.

Turturro appeared as Maura Figgis, sister of gangster Jimmy "The Butcher" Figgis on the Fox police procedural sitcom, Brooklyn Nine-Nine. The following year, Turturro appeared in "Il Mostro" in the 2017 season of Criminal Minds: Beyond Borders.

== Personal life ==
Turturro is the younger cousin of actors John Turturro and Nicholas Turturro.

Turturro has battled several medical disorders and spoken publicly about them. In 2001, she was diagnosed with type 2 diabetes and became a spokesperson for the long-acting insulin Lantus. She has rheumatoid arthritis and has worked to raise public awareness of the disorder.

In 2018, Turturro was traveling to visit a friend in New York when she abruptly felt a strong pain in her heart. Despite being on the floor with pain, she denied her friend's request to call an ambulance and walked home. Eventually, she contacted a doctor, who referred her to a cardiologist. In an interview with People, she stated that, she went “to the doctor...and he's like, 'Yeah...you had a heart attack.'" She added that the cardiologist informed her that "88 to 90 percent" of her arteries were blocked. Turturro subsequently underwent a quadruple bypass surgery.

== Filmography ==
=== Film ===
Year	Title	Role	Notes
1989	True Love	Grace	
1991	What About Bob?	Prostitute	
1992	Mac	Wife	
1992	Jersey Girl	Angie	
1993	Life with Mikey	Officer Moran	
1993	Manhattan Murder Mystery	Hotel Day Clerk	
1993	The Saint of Fort Washington	State Employee	
1994	Angie	Tina	
1994	The Search for One-eye Jimmy	Madame Esther	
1994	Junior	Louise	
1995	Denise Calls Up	Linda	
1995	Stonewall	Bar Waitress	
1995	Money Train	Woman on Platform	
1996	Sleepers	Mrs. Salinas	
1996	Tales of Erotica	Kim	
1997	Made Men	Angie	
1997	Fool's Paradise	Susan	
1998	Fallen	Tiffany	
1998	Too Tired to Die	Fortune Teller 1 & 2	
1998	OK Garage	Mary the Bartender	
1998	Woo	Tookie	
1998	Illuminata	Marta	
1998	Jaded	Helen Norwich	
1998	Celebrity	Olga	
1998	Crossfire	Miss Pasquantonio	
1999	The 24 Hour Woman	Brenda	
1999	24 Nights	Marie	
1999	Deep Blue Sea	Brenda Kerns	
1999	Mickey Blue Eyes	Italian Waitress	
1999	Freak Weather	Glory	
1999	Bringing Out the Dead	Nurse Crupp	
1999	Play It to the Bone	Mad Greek Waitress	
2000	Joe Gould's Secret	Waitress	
2000	Home Sweet Hoboken	-	
2001	Crocodile Dundee in Los Angeles	Jean Ferraro	
2001	Sidewalks of New York	Shari	
2004	2BPerfectlyHonest	Emily / Gina	
2005	Romance & Cigarettes	Rosebud	
2010	A Little Help	Nancy Feldman	
2011	Mozzarella Stories	Autilia	
2013	Fading Gigolo	Driver's Wife	
2014	Rob the Mob	Anna	
2018	Making a Killing	Connie	
2018	Head Full of Honey	Margaret	
2020	Corners	Joan	Short
2022	Call Jane	Sister Mike	
2026	The Only Living Pickpocket in New York	Bonnie	

=== Television ===
Year	Title	Role	Notes
1990	Law & Order	Carmen	Episode: "Happily Ever After"
1993	TriBeCa	Manicurist	Episode: "The Hopeless Romantic"
1994	Law & Order	Cocktail Waitress	Episode: "Blue Bamboo"
1995	The Wright Verdicts	Lydia	Main cast
1995	New York News	Gina	Episode: "A Question of Truth"
1996	Law & Order	Receptionist	Episode: "I.D."
1996	Mr. & Mrs. Smith	Rox	Recurring cast
1997	The Practice	Caren Payne	Episode: "Race with the Devil"
1998	As the World Turns	Fran	Episode: "May 1, 1998"
2000–07	The Sopranos	Janice Soprano	Main cast (season 2-6)
2004	Wild Card	Maddy	Episode: "Premonition Mission"
2005	TV Land's Top Ten	Herself	Episode: "Sexiest Men"
2008	ER	Sheryl Hawkins	Recurring cast (season 14)
2010	Celebrity Ghost Stories	Herself	Episode: "Sugar Ray Leonard/Aida Tuturro/Johnathon Schaech/Sharon Angela"
2010	Mercy	Evelyn	Episode: "That Crazy Bitch Was Right"
2011	Curb Your Enthusiasm	Gabby	Episode: "Car Periscope"
2012	Pyramid	Herself/Celebrity Contestant	Recurring Contestant
2012	Nurse Jackie	Laura Vargas	Episode: "Day of the Iguana"
2013	Blue Bloods	Miss Dominga	Episode: "Drawing Dead"
2013–25	Law & Order: Special Victims Unit	Judge Felicia Catano	Guest (season 14 & 17 & 22-23 & 27), recurring cast (season 15-16 & 20-21 & 24)
2015	Extra Virgin	Herself	Episode: "A Day with the Girls"
2016	Unforgettable	Carrie's Psychic	Episode: "The Return of Eddie"
2016	Brooklyn Nine-Nine	Maura Figgis	Recurring cast (season 3)
2016	The Night Of	Rehab Worker	Episode: "The Art of War"
2017	Grey's Anatomy	Lynne Gagliano	Episode: "It Only Gets Much Worse"
2017	Criminal Minds: Beyond Borders	Carmela Tafani	Episode: "Il Mostro"
2017–23	The Blacklist	Heddie Hawkins	Recurring cast (season 5 & 7-9), guest (season 6 & 10)
2020	Power Book II: Ghost	Judge Janine Galanti	Episode: "The Stranger"
2021	What We Do in the Shadows	Gail	Episode: "Gail"
2022	New Amsterdam	Callie Cruz	Episode: "Give Me a Sign"
2022	Just One Kiss	Sofia Romano	TV movie
2025	Good American Family	Myra Grant	Episode: "Right There in Black and White"
