= Holt McCallany =

American actor (born 1963)

- McCallany in 2026
- Born: Holt Quinn McAloney; September 3, 1963 (age 63); New York City, U.S.
- Occupation: Actor
- Years active: 1986–present
- Mother: Julie Wilson

Holt McCallany (born Holt Quinn McAloney; September 3, 1963) is an American actor. He is known for portraying FBI Special Agent Bill Tench on the series Mindhunter (2017–19) and has had leading and supporting roles in various television series and films, including Lights Out, Fight Club, Three Kings, Shot Caller, Wrath of Man, Nightmare Alley, and The Iron Claw.

== Early life ==
McCallany was born September 3, 1963, in New York City, to theatrical parents. His mother, Julie Wilson (1924–2015), was an American singer and actress, "widely regarded as the queen of cabaret." His father, Michael McAloney (1924–2000), was an Irish actor and producer best known for his Tony Award-winning production of Brendan Behan's Borstal Boy, an autobiographical play about a young member of the Irish Republican Army, which was the first Irish production to win top honors on Broadway.

Because his father wanted a classical education for his two sons, McCallany and his younger brother were sent to live with another family in Dublin, while his parents stayed in New York City, working. In Ireland, he attended a state elementary school in Howth. However, following his parents' divorce the children moved back to the United States. He attended school first in New Jersey and was later sent to live with his maternal grandparents in Omaha, Nebraska, where he had a troubled childhood and was expelled from Creighton Preparatory School. At the age of 14, he ran away from home and took a Greyhound bus to Los Angeles to pursue his dream of becoming an actor, but ended up with a job in a factory unloading trucks. His parents eventually tracked him down and sent him back to Ireland to a boarding school in County Kildare that his father had attended forty years earlier, Newbridge College.

He soon left Ireland and eventually was allowed to return to Creighton Preparatory School, and graduated in 1981. After high school, he went to France to continue his education, first to study French at the Sorbonne and art at the Paris American Academy, and later theater at L'École Marcel Marceau and L'École Jacques Lecoq. McCallany spent a summer studying Shakespeare at Oxford University and went with a production of Twelfth Night to the Edinburgh Fringe Festival before moving to New York City to begin his professional acting career.

== Career ==
His first job in the professional theater was as an apprentice actor at the Great Lakes Shakespeare Festival in Cleveland, Ohio, in the same apprenticeship once served by Tom Hanks, among others. Subsequently, he returned to New York City and was cast as an understudy in the Broadway production of Biloxi Blues.

McCallany landed a series of supporting parts in such films as Casualties of War, Alien 3, Creepshow 2, The Search for One-eye Jimmy and Jade, as well as the TV miniseries Rough Riders. After playing the legendary boxing trainer Teddy Atlas in the HBO telefilm Tyson, he became a supporter of the Atlas Foundation Charity, a grassroots organization dedicated to helping children and families with medical and financial hardships.

He continued working in films and television throughout the nineties and 2000s with roles in films such as Fight Club, Three Kings, Men of Honor and Below, among others. He played a detective with psychological problems in CSI: Miami and a soldier with post-traumatic stress disorder on Criminal Minds.

He appeared in the 2010 Warner Bros. film, The Losers, based on the graphic novel from DC Comics. McCallany also was the star of the 2011 FX television series, Lights Out, playing an aging boxer ("Patrick 'Lights' Leary") forced out of retirement and into a comeback bid to regain the heavyweight title, despite having pugilistic dementia.

He followed this with roles in films like Sully, Shot Caller and Blackhat, among many others.

From 2017 to 2019, McCallany co-starred in the Netflix series Mindhunter for director David Fincher. He played Bill Tench, an FBI agent researching serial killers in the late 1970s. His first French-language film, an adaptation of the Georges Feydeau comedy Le Dindon, was released in September 2019.

== Filmography ==
=== Film ===
Year	Title	Role	Notes
1987	Creepshow 2	Sam Whitemoon	
1988	After School	Jay	
1988	Shakedown	Roadblock Officer	
1989	Casualties of War	Lieutenant Kramer	
1992	Alien 3	Junior	
1994	Amateur	Usher	
1994	The Search for One-eye Jimmy	Les	
1995	Flirt	The Bartender	
1995	Jade	Bill Barrett	
1997	The Peacemaker	Mark Appleton	
1999	Mumford	Newcomer	Uncredited
1999	Fight Club	The Mechanic	
1999	Three Kings	Captain Doug Van Meter	
2000	Men of Honor	MM1 Dylan Rourke	
2001	Out of Line	Henri Brulé	
2002	Below	Lieutenant Paul Loomis	
2004	Against the Ropes	Doug Doherty	
2005	The Kingdom of Ultimate Power	Boss #2	Short film
2006	Alpha Dog	Detective Tom Finnegan	
2007	Rise: Blood Hunter	Rourke	
2008	Vantage Point	Secret Service Agent Ron Matthews	
2008	Toxic	Van	
2009	A Perfect Getaway	Police Lieutenant	
2009	Stolen	"Swede"	
2010	The Losers	Wade	
2012	Hijacked	Rostow	
2012	Bullet to the Head	Hank Greely	
2013	Gangster Squad	Karl Lennox	
2013	Crush	Mike Norris	Direct-to-DVD
2015	Run All Night	Frank	
2015	Blackhat	Deputy United States Marshal Jessup	
2015	The Perfect Guy	Detective Hansen	
2015	Concussion	Angry Neurologist	
2016	The Ganzfeld Haunting	Detective Murphy	
2016	Sully	Mike Cleary	
2016	Jack Reacher: Never Go Back	Colonel Sam Morgan	
2016	Monster Trucks	Burke	
2017	Shot Caller	Jerry "The Beast" Manning	
2017	Justice League	Burglar	Uncredited
2018	Beyond White Space	Richard Bentley	
2019	Sgt. Will Gardner	Officer Callahan	
2019	Le Dindon	Mr. Wayne	
2020	Greenland	Pilot #1	
2021	Wrath of Man	Haiden "Bullet" Blaire	
2021	The Ice Road	Rene Lampard	
2021	Nightmare Alley	Anderson	
2022	Wolves	Westview Country Supply Manager	Voice
2023	The Iron Claw	Fritz Von Erich	
2025	The Amateur	CIA Deputy Director Alex Moore	
2025	Mission: Impossible – The Final Reckoning	Secretary of Defense Bernstein	
2025	Safe House	Halton	
2025	Guru	Peter Conrad	
2026	Clean Hands	David Trone	
2026	The Further Mis-Adventures of Cliff Booth	TBA	

=== Television ===
Year	Title	Role	Notes
1986	All My Children	Bruce Emory	1 episode
1993	Zelda		Television film
1994	Law & Order	Marc Kenner	Episode: "Doubles"
1995	Tyson	Teddy Atlas	Television film
1995	Tecumseh: The Last Warrior	Blue Jacket	Television film
1997	The Advocate's Devil	Joe Campbell	Television film
1997	Rough Riders	Sergeant Hamilton Fish	2 episodes
1999	Law & Order	Officer Steve Felton	Episode: "Shield"
2000	Kiss Tomorrow Goodbye	Minnow	Television film
2000	L.A. County 187	Deputy John Gustodas	Pilot
2000–2001	Freedom	Owen Decker	12 episodes
2003, 2005	CSI: Miami	Detective John Hagen	11 episodes
2004	Monk	Pat Van Ranken	Episode: "Mr. Monk and the Three Pies"
2006	Law & Order: Special Victims Unit	Walter Inman	Episode: "Manipulated"
2006	Underfunded	Alex Breech	Television film
2007	Medium	Nick Lewin	Episode: "Better Off Dead"
2007	Heroes	Ricky McKenna	4 episodes
2007	Criminal Minds	Roy Woodridge	Episode: "Distress"
2007–2008	Law & Order: Criminal Intent	Detective Patrick Copa	2 episodes
2008	CSI	Mr. Westerman	Episode: Young Man with a Horn
2009	Bound by a Secret	Jimmy	Television film
2009	Burn Notice	Santora	Episode: "Question and Answer"
2010	Night and Day	Bobby Kohl	Pilot
2011	Lights Out	Patrick "Lights" Leary	14 episodes
2012	Law & Order: Special Victims Unit	Donald O'Keefe	Episode: "Official Story"
2013	Golden Boy	Detective Joe Diaco	13 episodes
2014–2015	Blue Bloods	District Attorney Robert McCoy	5 episodes
2015	Warrior	Andriv Vorobin	Pilot
2017–2019	Mindhunter	Bill Tench	19 episodes
2022	61st Street	Lieutenant Brannigan	8 episodes
2023	Foundation	Warden Jaegger Fount	2 episodes
2024	The Lincoln Lawyer	Neil Bishop	3rd season
2025	The Waterfront	Harlan Buckley	Main role
2026	Percy Jackson and the Olympians	Atlas	3rd season

=== Video games ===
Year	Title	Voice role
2000	Star Wars: Demolition	Wade Vox
2004	Fight Club	The Mechanic
