= Adam LeFevre =

American dramatist

- Born: August 11, 1950 (age 76); Albany, New York, U.S.
- Education: Williams College (BA); University of Iowa (MFA)
- Occupations: Actor; playwright; poet
- Years active: 1979–present

Adam LeFevre (born August 11, 1950) is an American character actor, poet, and playwright who works in cinema, television, theater and commercials.

== Biography ==
LeFevre was born in Albany, New York, the son of Helen (née Rhodes), a hospital patient representative, and Ira Deyo LeFevre, a physician. He completed his undergraduate at Williams College in 1972, and he holds graduate degrees from both the Iowa Playwrights Workshop and the Iowa Writers' Workshop at the University of Iowa.

In 2012, LeFevre appeared as Farley in the off-Broadway production of Him at Primary Stages.

== Filmography ==
=== Film ===
Adam LeFevre film credits
Year	Title	Role
1980	Return of the Secaucus 7	J.T.
1984	Reckless	Officer Haskell
1989	Second Sight	Mike
1990	Tune in Tomorrow	Large Albanian Man
1990	The Bonfire of the Vanities	Rawlie Thorpe
1992	That Night	Mr. Carpenter
1993	Mr. Wonderful	Kevin Klassic
1993	Philadelphia	Jill's Husband
1994	Angie	Museum Guard
1994	The Ref	Gary
1994	Only You	Damon Bradley
1994	The Search for One-eye Jimmy	Detective
1996	Beautiful Girls	Victor
1996	A Couch in New York	Restaurant Patron
1996	The Mirror Has Two Faces	Doorman
1997	Private Parts	Sales Manager
1997	Jungle 2 Jungle	Morrison
1997	In & Out	Bachelor Party Guest
1998	Rounders	Sean Frye
1998	Above Freezing	Best Man at Wedding
1999	Music of the Heart	Mr. Klein
2000	You Can Count on Me	Sheriff Darryl
2000	Ten Hundred Kings	Frank
2001	L.I.E.	Elliot
2001	Hearts in Atlantis	Don Biderman
2002	Tadpole	Phil
2002	Dummy	Theater Director
2002	Emmett's Mark	Officer Jim Fields
2002	Fabled	Pharmacist
2002	Two Weeks Notice	RV Man
2003	Nola	Sam
2004	House of D	Monty
2004	The Manchurian Candidate	Congressman Healy
2004	Imaginary Heroes	Bob Clyde
2004	Taxi	Big Cop
2005	Hitch	Speed Dating Guy
2005	Miss Congeniality 2: Armed and Fabulous	Bartender
2005	Romance & Cigarettes	Fruitman
2005	12 and Holding	Gabe Artunion
2006	Unconscious	Detective Rice
2006	Waltzing Anna	Dr. Conley
2006	The Sensation of Sight	Alice's Boss
2006	Arthur and the Minimoys	Davido
2007	I Think I Love My Wife	Maitre'd
2007	Mo	Jim
2007	Day Zero	Client
2007	The Invasion	Richard Lenk
2007	The Babysitters	Mr. Brown
2007	I Do & I Don't	Father Makowski
2008	Pretty Bird	Phil the Neighbor
2008	Fool's Gold	Gary
2008	College Road Trip	Judge
2009	Adam	Mr. Wardlow
2009	The Good Guy	Billy
2009	Taking Woodstock	Dave
2009	How to Seduce Difficult Women	Ira
2010	She's Out of My League	Mr. Kettner
2010	The Bounty Hunter	Edmund
2010	The Scientist	Dr. Alan Reed
2010	Fair Game	Karl Rove
2011	Silver Tongues	Police Chief
2011	Margaret	Rob
2012	The Lucky One	Judge Clayton
2012	The Dictator	Man in Helicopter
2012	Alter Egos	Local Man (uncredited)
2013	The Lifeguard	Hans
2013	Molly's Theory of Relativity	Boris
2013	Syrup	Priest
2014	Night Has Settled	Kimo
2015	The Adderall Diaries	Bill DuBois
2015	Chasing Yesterday	Jim
2015	The Program	Jeffrey Tillotson
2015	Freeheld	Don Bennett
2016	Almost Paris	Richard
2016	Wild Oats	Randall
2016	Love on the Run	Bank Manager
2016	Gold	Bobby Burns
2018	Radium Girls	Carnival Barker

=== Television ===
Adam LeFevre television credits
Year	Title	Role	Notes
1987	The Equalizer	Foster	Episode: "Encounter in a Closed Room"
1990–2009	Law & Order	(various roles)	7 episodes
1991	All My Children	Dewitt	
1998–2010	As the World Turns	Judge Collins / Judge Berlin / Marty / Judge	10 episodes
1999	Storm of the Century	Ferd Andrews	TV miniseries
2002	Law & Order: Criminal Intent	Toby Windemere	Episode: "Faith"
2000	Law & Order: Special Victims Unit	Principal	Episode: "Chat Room"
2001	Law & Order: Special Victims Unit	Chief Walker	Episode: "Manhunt"
2003	Law & Order: Special Victims Unit	Rye Police Chief	Episode: "Desperate"
2005	Law & Order: Special Victims Unit	Ray Monaghan	Episode: "Alien"
2005	Empire Falls	Father Mark	TV miniseries
2008	Recount	Mark Herron	TV movie
2020	Ozark	Carl	2 episodes
2011	Person of Interest	Anthony Talbott	1 episode
2012	The Good Wife	Judge Gregory Kakissis	1 episode
2012	Elementary	Ed Hairston	1 episode
2017-2020	The Sinner	Police Chief	9 episodes
