= The Search for One-eye Jimmy =

- Directed by: Sam Henry Kass
- Written by: Sam Henry Kass
- Produced by: Lisa Bruce; Robert Nickson
- Starring: Nick Turturro; Holt McCallany; Ray 'Boom Boom' Mancini; Michael Badalucco; Jennifer Beals; John Turturro; Steve Buscemi; Sam Jackson
- Cinematography: Lodge Kerrigan; Chuck Levey; Robert Nickson
- Edited by: Marc Jurgens
- Music by: William Bloom; George Small
- Production company: Orenda Films
- Distributed by: Sony Pictures Classics
- Release date: June 21, 1996 (United States)
- Running time: 80 minutes
- Country: United States
- Language: English
- Box office: $71,314

The Search for One-eye Jimmy is a 1994 comedy film written and directed by Sam Henry Kass.

== Synopsis ==
Set in Brooklyn, New York, the movie is the story of a California film student Les (Holt McCallany) who returns to the town in which he grew up to shoot a film about it. The first individual he happens upon is Joe "Head" (so named because of the size of his head) played by Michael Badalucco. While interviewing him, they are told of a neighborhood man named "One-eyed" Jimmy (because of his glass eye) who has gone missing.

They then decide to switch gears from a documentary to a docu-drama, filming the hunt for Jimmy as they go. They come across one quirky character after another, each one giving his account of where Jimmy was last, or where he could be.

Jimmy's brother, played by Steve Buscemi, is not very interested in finding his brother. "Disco Bean", John Turturro's version of a disco-dancing freak stuck in an abandoned building dancing non-stop actually gives his account of how Jimmy lost his eye. "Colonel Ron", (Samuel L. Jackson), is a homeless, toothless, strange Vietnam veteran who catches fish in the Gowanus Canal, and may actually be the most intelligent one in the bunch.

"Lefty" (Mancini) and "Junior" (Nick Turturro) constantly get into physical altercations because Junior, a kleptomaniac, is always stealing Lefty's car. Completely distraught, Jimmy's mother (Anne Meara) commissions an amateur sketch artist Ellen (Jennifer Beals) to craft a poorly drawn portrait of Jimmy on a "missing person" flyer from a photograph, rather than using the actual photograph itself.

The group uncover a ransom note, but to meet the demands of the "kidnapper" (Junior sent the note, pretending to have captured Jimmy), they must borrow $10,000. They turn to local loan shark "The Snake" (Sirico), who thinks it is not worth the asking price to rescue Jimmy, who he calls a "bum". Snake was formerly known as "The Whale" but has just returned from six months in a health spa where he lost two hundred pounds. The gang pays a visit to a psychic (Aida Turturro), who assures them that Jimmy is nearby.

Jimmy's mother decides to throw a "welcome home" party, and invites the zany characters that we have met along the way. They all show up, and have a great time, and Joe Head woos Ellen as he displays dance moves passed on to him by Disco Bean.

Jimmy winds up making his way home after his mother calls an early end to the party. While doing laundry in the basement, the elevator broke down; unable to get back to the ground floor, he broke into the out-of-town superintendent's apartment, where he stayed alive by eating cat food. Shaking, he recounts a tale of not having any beer to drink during his disappearance and having to watch television without cable. Jimmy vows that he will never do laundry in the building again.

Les leaves, disappointed about the anticlimactic end to his story, but parts with Joe as friends. Later on, Joe and Junior, claiming they now own the rights after a financial dispute, are seen pitching the story and signing a deal with a Hollywood executive. When they leave, Junior steals the executive's car.

== Cast ==
- Sam Rockwell as Jimmy "One-Eye Jimmy" Hoyt
- Steve Buscemi as Ed Hoyt
- John Turturro as "Disco" Bean
- Nicholas Turturro as Junior
- Aida Turturro as Madame Esther
- Anne Meara as Holly Hoyt
- Samuel L. Jackson as Colonel Ron
- Adam LeFevre as Detective
- Holt McCallany as Les
- Ray 'Boom Boom' Mancini as "Lefty"
- Jennifer Beals as Ellen
- Michael Badalucco as Joe Head
- Tony Sirico as "Whale" / "Snake"
- Mallory Kass as Little Girl

== Screenings ==
The Search for One-Eye Jimmy had a 25th Anniversary screening at The Art of Brooklyn Film Festival in June 2017. Director Sam Henry Kass was in attendance for the Q&A that followed.
