= The Only Living Pickpocket in New York =

2026 film by Noah Segan

- Theatrical release poster
- Directed by: Noah Segan
- Written by: Noah Segan
- Produced by: Leopold Hughes; Katie McNeill; Ben LeClair
- Starring: John Turturro; Giancarlo Esposito; Will Price; Tatiana Maslany; Steve Buscemi
- Cinematography: Sam Levy
- Edited by: Hilda Rasula
- Music by: Gary Lionelli
- Production companies: MRC; T-Street
- Distributed by: Sony Pictures Classics
- Release dates: January 27, 2026 (Sundance); October 23, 2026 (New York and Los Angeles); October 30, 2026 (United States)
- Running time: 88 minutes
- Country: United States
- Language: English
- Box office: $5 million

The Only Living Pickpocket in New York is a 2026 American crime thriller film written and directed by Noah Segan. It stars John Turturro, Giancarlo Esposito, Will Price, Tatiana Maslany, and Steve Buscemi.

The film had its world premiere at the 2026 Sundance Film Festival on January 27, and its international premiere out of competition of the 76th Berlin International Film Festival on February 20. It had a limited theatrical release in New York City and Los Angeles on October 23, followed by a nationwide expansion a week later by Sony Pictures Classics. The film received widespread praise from critics.

== Plot ==
Harry Lehman is an aging pickpocket who lives in The Bronx, New York City, with his wife Rosie, who is catatonic and unable to speak. Harry does not own a cell phone and has very limited understanding of modern technology.

One evening, Harry pickpockets a young man, Dylan, and steals a duffel bag from his car, which he promptly discards after finding a gun inside. After discovering he has been robbed, Dylan identifies Harry using surveillance cameras.

The next day, Harry visits his friend Ben, who owns a pawn shop and is the fence for his stolen goods. Harry presents him with a variety of cell phones, Dylan's watch, and Dylan's USB crypto wallet; neither of them can identify the USB device. Ben plugs the device into an old computer but is unable to open it. He recommends that Harry visit Frank, a fence in Chinatown who is more familiar with electronics.

Harry goes to Frank's Chinese herb shop. Frank buys the device from Harry, along with some smartphones. On his way home, Harry passes Ben's shop to discover it has been ransacked. Unbeknownst to Harry, the device had a tracker on it; after locating the shop, Dylan destroyed it in search of the device. An apologetic Ben admits that he was forced to divulge Harry's home address.

Harry returns home to find Dylan threatening Rosie. Dylan reveals that he is the heir of a criminal "family", and Harry is irrevocably condemned to death for crossing him, though he promises to spare Rosie if Dylan is able to return the device in six hours. Harry uses a payphone to contact his friend Allan, a police detective. Allan discreetly shows him an address in Sheepshead Bay, Brooklyn which is affiliated with Frank. In Brooklyn, Harry visits an electronics store run by Frank's grandson. He refuses to help Harry and turns him away, but Harry returns and steals the device back by causing a disturbance outside the store.

Harry calls his home using a stranger's cell phone to inform Dylan that he has the device. Dylan still says that he will have to "pay" for his crime. Fearing that he may be dead soon, Harry visits his estranged daughter, Kelly, in Forest Hills, Queens. On his way home, he stops at Ben's store.

Harry returns home, with Ben and Ben's granddaughter, Eve, and returns the crypto wallet back to Dylan. Ben and Eve help Rosie downstairs and take her with them.

A car takes Harry away towards Staten Island, and Dylan's grandmother, the matriarch of the crime organization, reminisces with Harry about the old days. In flashbacks, it is revealed that Eve was able to clone the crypto wallet, and Harry had stolen Dylan's smartwatch, leaving it for Ben and Eve to find. She uses the smartwatch to verify the wallet's two-factor authentication and steals Dylan's cryptocurrency, worth just under $1,000,000, before they leave the United States via the Canadian border to escape retribution from the mob. Some of the money is left for Kelly in an unmarked envelope.

The film ends with Harry staring across the harbor at Manhattan, the World Trade Center in the background, ready for his impending death.

== Cast ==
- John Turturro as Harry Lehman
- Giancarlo Esposito as Detective Allan Warren
- Will Price as Dylan
- Tatiana Maslany as Kelly
- Victoria Moroles as Eve
- Steve Buscemi as Ben
- Jamie Lee Curtis as Moira
- Lori Tan Chinn as Gena
- Kelvin Han Yee as Frank
- Karina Arroyave as Rosie
- John Gallagher Jr. as the Businessman
- Jack Mulhern as Bryce
- Michael Hsu Rosen as Ernie
- Aida Turturro as Bonnie
- Mark Cayne as Billy

== Production ==
In April 2025, principal photography began in New York City, when it was announced that Noah Segan would be writing and directing a crime thriller film, starring John Turturro as Harry. Later that month, Giancarlo Esposito, Tatiana Maslany, Steve Buscemi, Victoria Moroles, and Will Price rounded out the cast. In January 2026, Jamie Lee Curtis was revealed to have joined the cast.

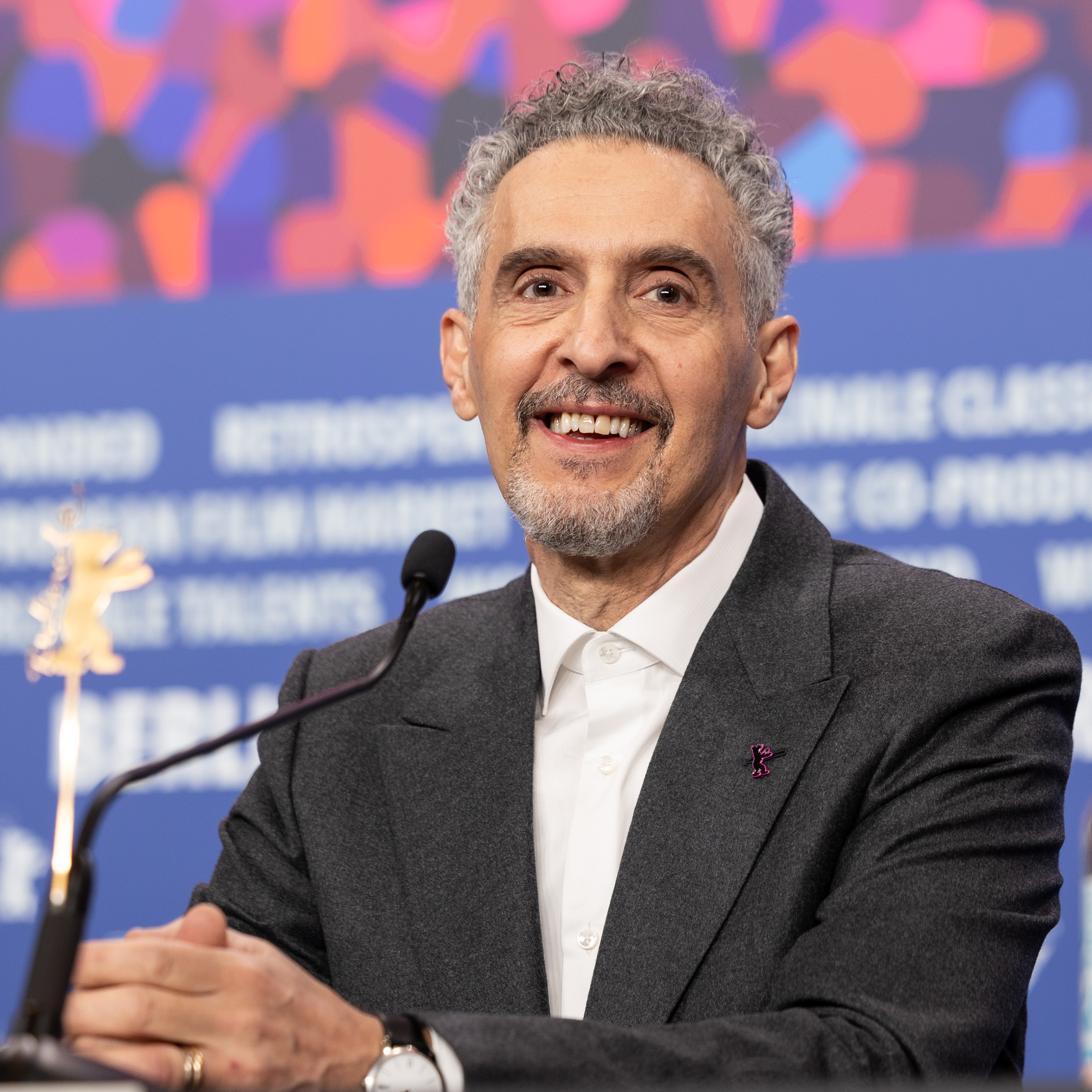
Turturro at the 76th Berlin International Film Festival

== Release ==
The Only Living Pickpocket in New York premiered at the Eccles Theater as part of the 2026 Sundance Film Festival, on January 27, and had its international premiere out of competition at the 76th Berlin International Film Festival on February 20. It closed the 60th Karlovy Vary International Film Festival on 11 July 2026, it was also selected for the 53rd Telluride Film Festival, and the 2026 Toronto International Film Festival, and 2026 New York Film Festival.

In February 2026, Sony Pictures Classics acquired distribution rights to the film, with plans to release it that fall. The film is scheduled for a limited theatrical release in Los Angeles and New York City on October 23, 2026, expanding nationwide a week later on October 30.

== Reception ==
On the review aggregator website Rotten Tomatoes, 98% of 135 critics' reviews are positive, with an average rating of 7.9/10. The website's consensus reads: "A graceful character study that affords John Turturro one of the best roles of his career, The Only Living Pickpocket in New York astutely captures the struggle to scrape by in a world that won't stop changing the rules." Metacritic, which uses a weighted average, assigned the film a score of 82 out of 100, based on 33 critics, indicating "universal acclaim".

Writing for IndieWire, critic Beandrea July gave the film an A grade and named it an IndieWire Critic's Pick, calling it a rare find and a welcome update to the New York crime movie genre praised for its authentic outer-borough setting. Variety also marks this film as a "critics pick."
