= Maddie Blaustein =

American voice actress (1960–2008)

- Born: Adam Blaustein; October 9, 1960; Long Island, New York, U.S.
- Died: December 11, 2008 (aged 48)
- Resting place: Congregation B'nai Israel Cemetery
- Occupations: Voice actress; comic writer
- Years active: 1985–2008
- Notable credit: Pokémon as Meowth
- Relatives: Jeremy Blaustein (brother)

Madeleine Joan Blaustein (October 9, 1960 – December 11, 2008), also known as Kendra Bancroft, was an American voice actress and comic writer who was known for her voice acting work for 4Kids Entertainment, DuArt Film and Video and NYAV Post, for her reprising role as the character Meowth from the Pokémon anime series and for comics written for Milestone Comics, in which she introduced one of superhero comics' first transgender female characters. She was the first intersex and transgender voice artist for many of her respective agencies.

== Career ==
In the late 1980s, Blaustein worked for Marvel Comics, as an editor (several issues each of Web of Spider-Man, Marvel Tales, and Marvel Saga) and as a writer (several issues of Conan the King); she also penciled a one-shot of Power Pachyderms. She wrote assorted comics published by DC Comics in the early 1990s, including a few for the Impact Comics imprint and TSR line.

In 1994, she went to work for Milestone Media as production manager and writer. With assistance from her partner Yves Fezzani – sometimes billed together as "Adam & Yves" – she wrote issues of flagship titles Hardware and Static (in which she co-created the character Karmon Stringer/Rubberband Man). With Fezzani, she wrote Milestone's first limited series Deathwish. As its central character, Deathwish featured transgender female police officer Marisa Rahm; Rahm is one of the first trans heroes featured in mainstream superhero comics. During this time, she was sometimes referred to in editorial copy in the comics as "Addie Blaustein".

After leaving Milestone, Blaustein served as Creative Director for Weekly World News.

Blaustein was a voice actress at 4Kids Entertainment, where she worked on the English dub version of the Pokémon anime. She provided "filler" voices for various characters until episode #31, when she took over from Nathan Price in the role of Meowth, which she played through season 8. During the 2004 Democratic Party presidential primaries, she voiced Sméagol on The Mike Malloy Show, announcing a satirical presidential bid.

Beginning in 2004 under the pseudonym "Kendra Bancroft", Blaustein was a content creator on the Second Life platform.

== Personal life ==
Blaustein was born on Long Island, New York, and was the second oldest of five children. She was assigned male at birth. She was born intersex, and transitioned to female. Her experience as an activist in the transgender community helped her to organize and support groups of people in Second Life.

Video game localization coordinator and translator Jeremy Blaustein is her brother.

== Death ==
Blaustein died on December 11, 2008, at age 48, from an untreated stomach virus (possibly gastroenteritis) that she had been suffering from a couple of weeks prior. She is buried at the Congregation B'nai Israel Cemetery in Northampton, Massachusetts.

== Filmography ==
=== Voice roles ===
- Cutie Honey (live action movie) – Sister Jill
- Cubix – Dr. K
- Dinosaur King – Helga (Season 1)
- One Piece - Dr. Kureha (4Kids dub)
- Domain of Murder – Detective Shimizu
- Funky Cops - Additional voices
- G.I. Joe: Sigma 6 - Overkill
- Garfield's Fun Fest - Alligators
- Huntik: Secrets & Seekers – Rassimov (Ep. "Mission"; Posthumous release)
- Impy's Island – Shoe the Shoebill
- Impy's Wonderland – Shoe the Shoebill
- Jungle Emperor Leo - Mother, Trainer
- Kirby: Right Back at Ya! - Chef Kawasaki, Waddle Doo, Professor Curio, Tuggle, Gengu, Melman, Biblio
- Mutant Rampage Bodyslam – L. Wolf Jam
- Pokémon – Meowth (1998–2006), additional voices
  - Pokémon Chronicles – Meowth
  - Pokémon: The First Movie – Meowth
  - Pokémon the Movie 2000 – Meowth
  - Pokémon 3: The Movie – Meowth
  - Pokémon: Mewtwo Returns – Meowth
  - Pokémon 4Ever – Meowth
  - Pokémon Heroes – Meowth
  - Pokémon: Jirachi, Wish Maker – Meowth
  - Pokémon: Destiny Deoxys – Meowth
  - Pokémon: Lucario and the Mystery of Mew – Meowth
- Samurai Deeper Kyo – Migeira
- Yu-Gi-Oh! Duel Monsters - Solomon Muto
- Yu-Gi-Oh! GX - Sartorius Kumar
- Slayers Try – Jillas Jillos Jilles
- The Little Panda Fighter – Grizzlepuss
- Tiny Robots - Nev1
- Viva Piñata – Corinna
- Wild Cardz - King

=== Video games ===
- Pokémon Channel - Meowth
- Shadow the Hedgehog – President
- Sonic the Hedgehog - E-123 Omega
- Valkyrie Profile – Arngrim, Barbarossa, Lawfer, Lezard Valeth

== Other work ==
=== Writing ===
- Web of Spider-Man #45 (Marvel Comics)
- Deathwish #1-4 (Milestone Comics, four-issue miniseries, with Yves Fezzani)
- Hardware #20-21, 24, 26–28, 33 (Milestone Comics, The Hunt for Deathwish with Yves Fezzani)
- Static #30-34 (Milestone Comics, with Yves Fezzani)
- Icon #18 (Milestone Comics)

=== Art ===
- Power Pachyderms (pencils) – Marvel Comics (1989)
