= Richard Termini =

American singer

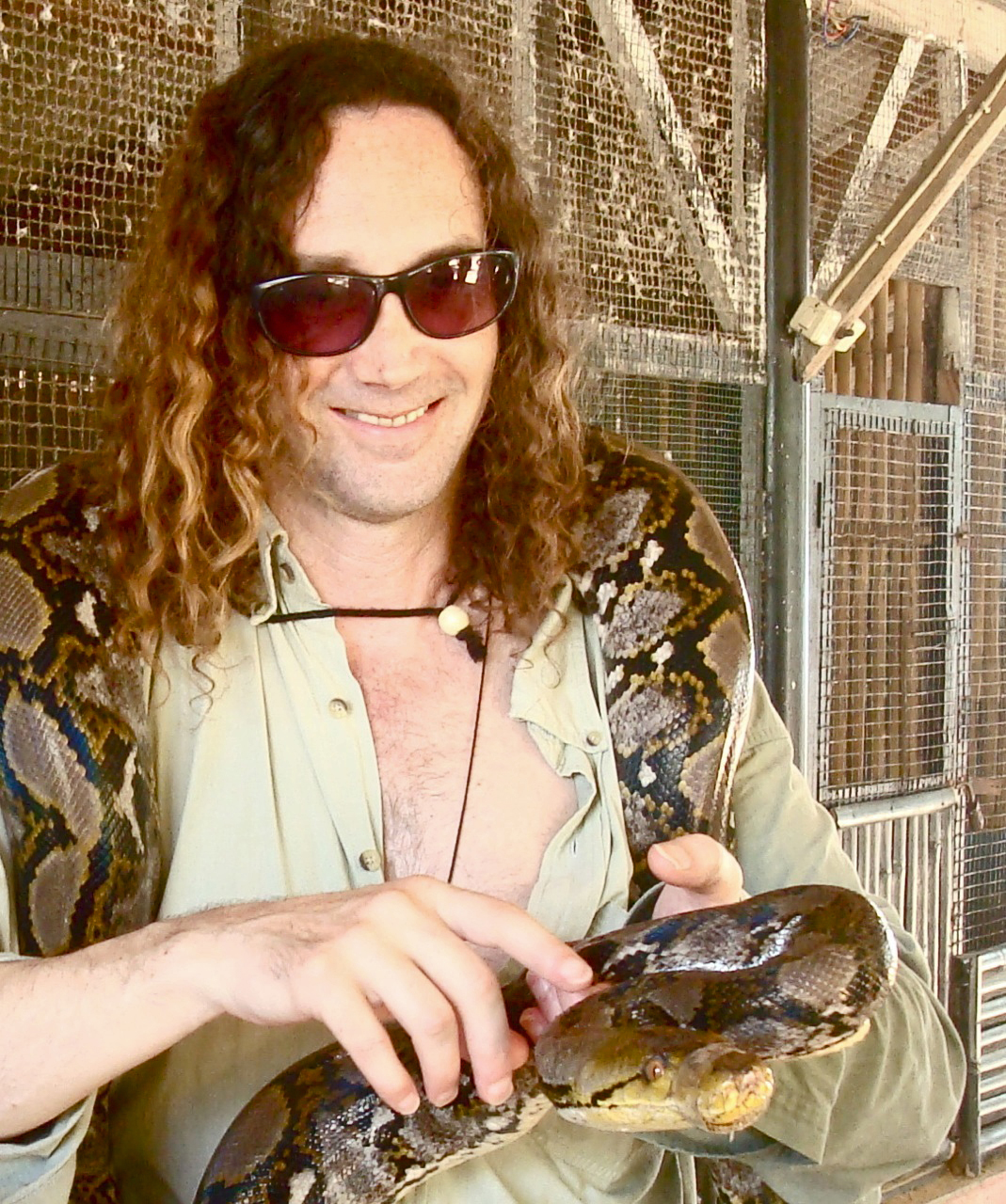
- Termini in 2012
- Born: June 20, 1956 (age 70); Brooklyn, New York City, U.S.
- Occupation: Educator
- Relatives: John Turturro (cousin); Nicholas Turturro (cousin)

Richard Joseph Vincent Termini (born June 20, 1956) is an American educator, musician, composer, film director, writer and photographer. As a musician Termini played synthesizers and keyboards on several recordings including Type O Negative: World Coming Down, Cyndi Lauper: platinum award winning album, She's So Unusual, Patty Smyth: Never Enough, The Fixx: Ink, Ellison Chase: Welcome to Tomorrow, Jing: Jing Machine and others. Termini also produced the Fallout single featuring future Type O Negative members Peter Steele and Josh Silver.

== Career ==
He produced and composed music for John Turturro's Cannes Caméra d'Or-winning film Mac and contributed additional music to Turturro's Illuminata and appears in the film as a Romani guitarist. Termini also composed, performed and produced the music for the Zack Winestine film 'States of Control'. Termini composed and performed music for Television including the animated Kids are Punny which included "Camel Dances" featuring the voice of Madonna.

Termini's published photographs include the band Carnivore's first album and several other iconic Carnivore photographs from that period. Termini worked for NewLook magazine in the 1980s and several of his photographs featuring CBGB and various artists are presented there.

Termini composed, produced and performed the music for many of Roman Paska's productions including The End of the World, Ghost Sonata, Moby Dick in Venice, Yerma and Arden/Ardennes (As You Like It).

Termini taught audio and recording arts in New York City's Center for the Media Arts, and was teacher and chairman at the Institute of Audio Research. He is the founder and former Director of Digital Media Arts (DMX) NYC.

In 2013 the short film The Door, written and directed by Termini won the Art of Brooklyn Film Festival Dark Side Award.

Termini continues to compose and perform today.
