= John Turturro =

American actor (born 1957)

- Turturro at the 2026 New York Film Festival
- Born: John Michael Turturro; February 28, 1957 (age 69); New York City, U.S.
- Citizenship: United States; Italy
- Education: State University of New York at New Paltz (BA); Yale University (MFA)
- Occupations: Actor; filmmaker
- Years active: 1980–present
- Spouse: Katherine Borowitz (m. 1985)
- Children: 2, including Arianna
- Relatives: Nicholas Turturro (brother); Aida Turturro (cousin); Richard Termini (cousin)

John Michael Turturro (/tərˈtʊəroʊ/ tər-TOOR-oh, Italian: [turˈturro]; born February 28, 1957) is an American actor and filmmaker. He is known for his varied roles in independent films, as well as his frequent collaborations with the Coen brothers and Spike Lee. His accolades include a Cannes Film Festival Award and a Primetime Emmy Award as well as nominations for three Golden Globe Awards.

He achieved his career breakthrough with Five Corners (1987). He acted in Spike Lee's Do the Right Thing (1989), Mo' Better Blues (1990), Jungle Fever (1991), and Clockers (1995). He also starred in the Coens' Miller's Crossing (1990), Barton Fink (1991), for which he won the Cannes Film Festival Award for Best Actor, The Big Lebowski (1998), and O Brother, Where Art Thou? (2000). He also starred in Fearless (1993), Quiz Show (1994), and Gloria Bell (2018); and portrayed Seymour Simmons in the Transformers film series (2007–2011, 2017) and Carmine Falcone in The Batman (2022).

For his guest role in the USA Network comedy series Monk, Turturro received a Primetime Emmy Award. He has also starred in the HBO thriller miniseries The Night Of (2016), the HBO miniseries The Plot Against America (2020), and the Apple TV+ thriller series Severance (2022–present).

He has directed five films, Mac (1992), Illuminata (1998), Romance and Cigarettes (2005), Fading Gigolo (2013), and The Jesus Rolls (2019).

== Early life and education ==
John Turturro was born on February 28, 1957 in the Brooklyn borough of New York City, the middle son of Katherine Florence (née Incerella) and Nicholas Turturro, Sr. His mother was born in the U.S. to parents with roots in Aragona, Sicily, Italy, and was an amateur jazz singer who worked in a naval yard during World War II.

His maternal grandmother died of an unsuccessful at-home abortion when his mother was six, leaving his mother in an orphanage, as his grandfather was unable to provide for the children on his own. His father emigrated at age six from Giovinazzo, Italy to the United States, and later worked as a carpenter and construction worker before joining the U.S. Navy. He died from lung cancer in 1988.

Turturro was raised as a Catholic and moved to the Rosedale section of Queens, New York, with his family when he was 6. He graduated from the State University of New York at New Paltz in 1979 with a Bachelor of Arts in theater studies. In 1983, he completed a Master of Fine Arts degree at the Yale School of Drama.

== Career ==
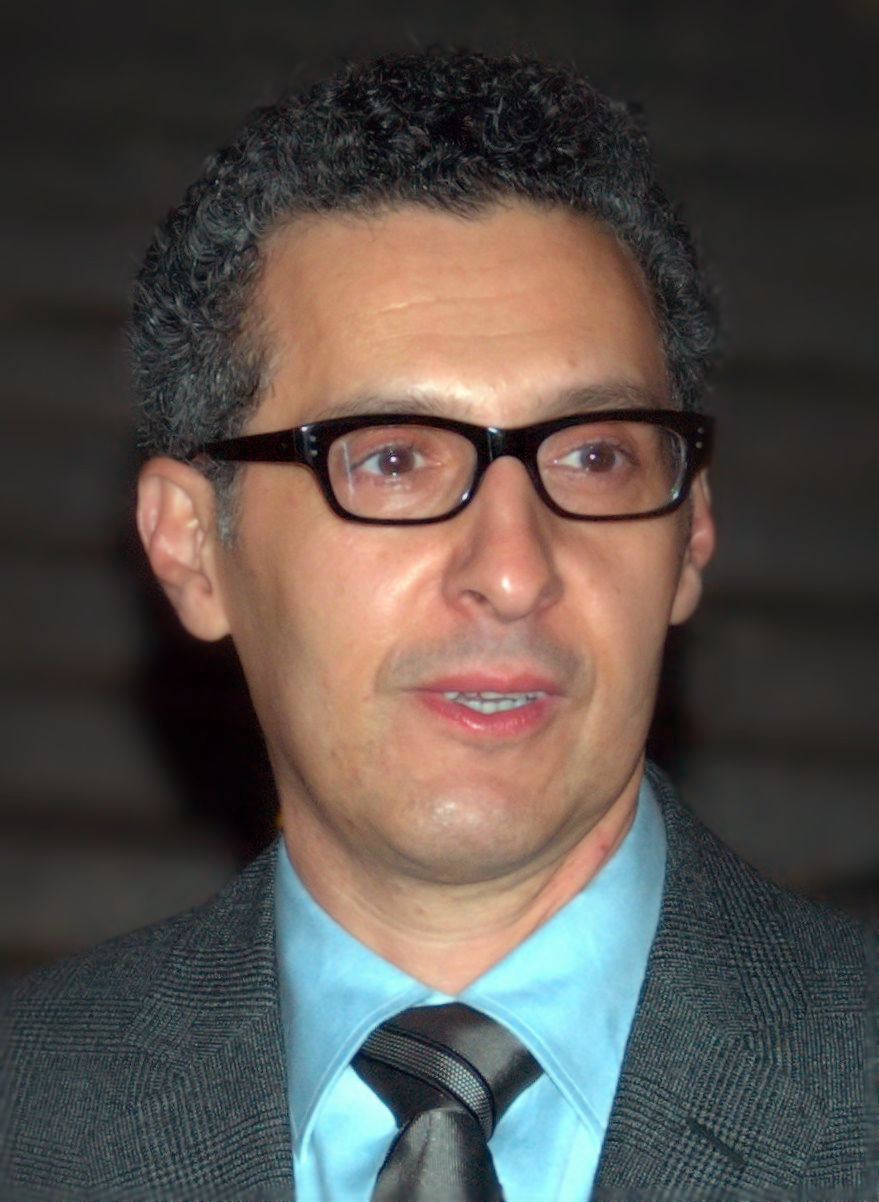
Turturro at the Tribeca Film Festival in 2009

Turturro's first film appearance was a non-speaking extra role in Raging Bull (1980). He created the title role of John Patrick Shanley's Danny and the Deep Blue Sea at the Playwrights Conference at the Eugene O'Neill Theatre Center in 1983. He repeated it the following year Off-Broadway and won an Obie Award. Turturro had a notable supporting role in William Friedkin's action film To Live and Die in L.A. (1985), as the henchman of the villainous counterfeiter played by Willem Dafoe.

Spike Lee liked Turturro's performance in Five Corners (1987) so much that he cast him in Do the Right Thing (1989). This movie was the first of a long-standing collaboration between the director and Turturro, which includes work together on nine films—more than any other actor in the Lee oeuvre—including Mo' Better Blues (1990), Jungle Fever (1991), Clockers (1995), Girl 6 (1996), He Got Game (1998), Summer of Sam (1999), She Hate Me (2004), and Miracle at St. Anna (2008).

Turturro has appeared in both comedy and drama films, and engaged in an extended collaboration with the Coen Brothers—he appeared in their films Miller's Crossing (1990), Barton Fink (1991, in the lead role), The Big Lebowski (1998), and O Brother, Where Art Thou? (2000). Turturro has appeared in several of Adam Sandler's movies, such as Mr. Deeds (2002) and You Don't Mess with the Zohan (2008). He played a severely disturbed patient of Jack Nicholson's character in the comedy Anger Management, and played Johnny Depp's character's antagonist in Secret Window.

Turturro hosted Saturday Night Live in 1994, where he spoofed his then-recently made film, Quiz Show, being told he was ineligible to host unless he answered questions in a booth and if he failed, the honor of hosting would go to Joey Buttafuoco, who witnessed Turturro's test. He won an Emmy Award for his portrayal of Adrian Monk's brother Ambrose in the USA Network series Monk, and reprised the role on numerous occasions. He has been nominated and won many awards from film organizations such as Screen Actors Guild, Cannes Film Festival, Golden Globes and others.

Turturro produced, directed and acted in, the film Illuminata (1999), which also starred his wife, actress Katherine Borowitz. He wrote and directed the film Romance and Cigarettes (2005). In 2006 he appeared in Robert De Niro's The Good Shepherd, and as the Sector 7 agent Seymour Simmons in four films of the Transformers live-action series. In 2010, he directed, and had cameo on-screen appearances in, Passione, which chronicles the rich musical heritage of Naples, Italy. His stage directorial debut was in October 2011, with the Broadway play Relatively Speaking, in which he guided an ensemble of veteran actors in a production of three comedic one-act plays, written by Elaine May, Woody Allen, and Ethan Coen. The cast included Julie Kavner, Marlo Thomas, Mark Linn-Baker, and Steve Guttenberg.

Turturro's fifth directorial film Fading Gigolo premiered at the Toronto International Film Festival (TIFF) in mid-September 2013. Turturro also acts in the film alongside Woody Allen, who plays a novice pimp overseeing the sex work of Turturro's character. In a September 2013 interview, Turturro expressed his intention to draw parallels between sex work and acting, explaining that acting is a "service business" in which actors are "acting out people's wishes or fantasies".

In March 2014, Turturro received the Career Achievement tribute and award at the 31st Edition of the Miami International Film Festival at the Olympia Theater in downtown Miami. Turturro starred in the 2016 miniseries The Night Of and received a Primetime Emmy Award nomination. In 2019, Turturro played William of Baskerville in a television adaptation of Umberto Eco's The Name of the Rose.

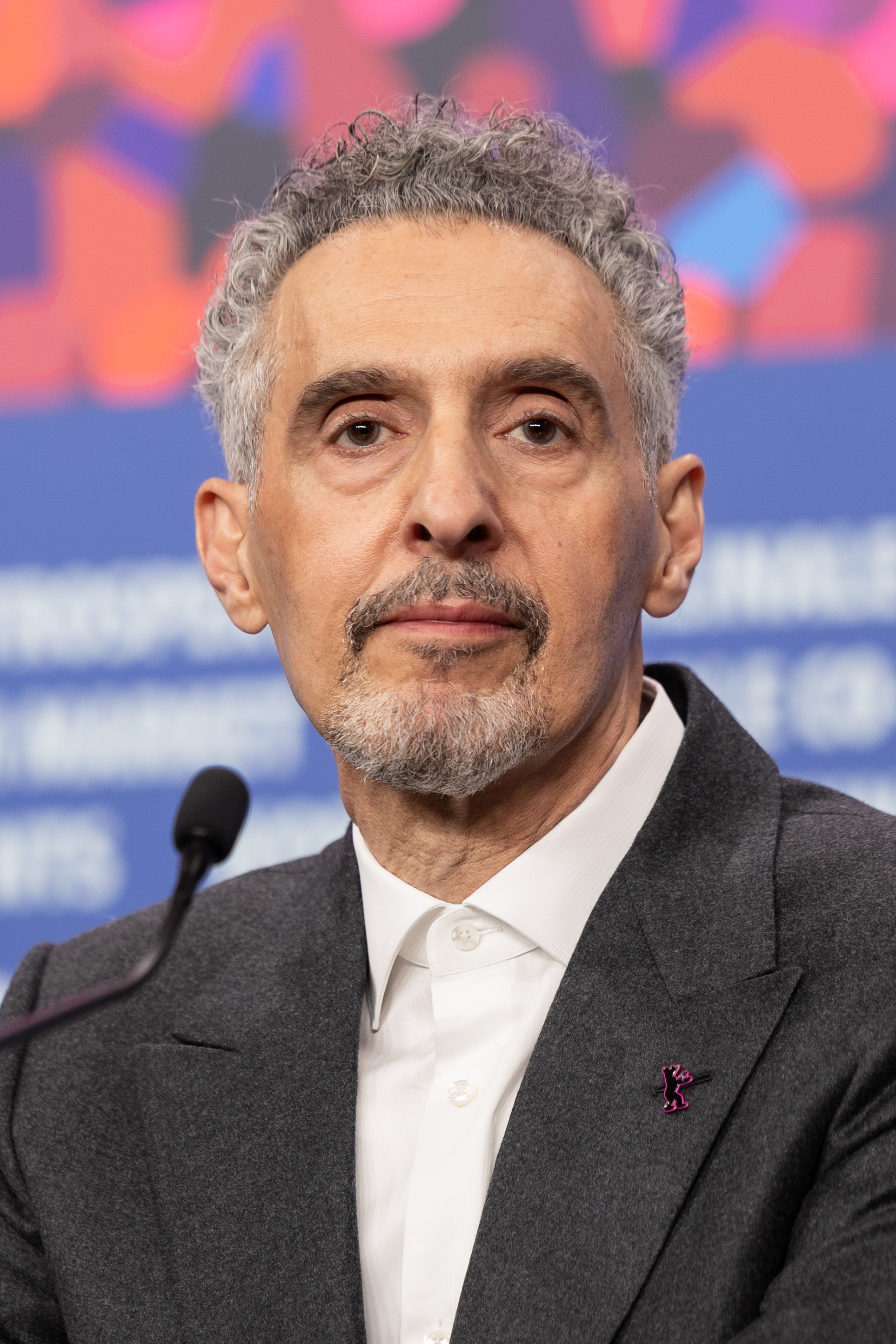
Turturro at the 2026 Berlin International Film Festival

In 2022, he appeared in Matt Reeves' film The Batman based on the DC Comics character of the same name as Carmine Falcone. In 2023 he starred as Mickey Sabbath in the off-Broadway adaptation of Philip Roth's novel Sabbath's Theater by The New Group at the Pershing Square Signature Center. Since 2022, Turturro has portrayed Irving Bailiff on the television series Severance.

In spring 2025 he was filming The Only Living Pickpocket in New York, directed by Noah Segan in New York City.

== Personal life ==
Turturro's younger brother is actor Nicholas Turturro. Composer and film director Richard Termini and actress Aida Turturro are his cousins. He has two children with his wife, actress Katherine Borowitz, who moved on to a social work career in 2016. One of those two children is Arianna Turturro, a comic book artist and former actress. Turturro's older brother, Ralph, resided at the Creedmoor Psychiatric Center from the early 2000s until his death in 2022.

John Turturro participates as a member of the Jury for the New York International Children's Film Festival (NYICFF), which is dedicated to screening films for children between the ages of 3 and 18. Turturro holds dual Italian and American citizenship as of January 2011.

He has lived in Park Slope in Brooklyn, New York, since 1988.

== Acting credits ==
=== Film ===
Year	Title	Role	Notes
1980	Raging Bull	Man at table	Uncredited
1984	Exterminator 2	Guy #1	
1984	The Flamingo Kid	Ted from Pinky's	
1985	Desperately Seeking Susan	Ray	
1985	To Live and Die in L.A.	Carl Cody	
1986	Hannah and Her Sisters	Writer	
1986	The Color of Money	Julian	
1986	Gung Ho	Willie	
1986	Off Beat	Neil Pepper	
1987	Five Corners	Heinz Zabantino	
1987	The Sicilian	Pisciotta	
1989	Do the Right Thing	Pino	
1990	Catchfire	Pinella	
1990	State of Grace	Detective Nick Richardson	
1990	Mo' Better Blues	'Moe' Flatbush	
1990	Miller's Crossing	Bernie 'The Shamata Kid' Bernbaum	
1991	Men of Respect	Mike Battaglia	
1991	Jungle Fever	Paulie Carbone	
1991	Barton Fink	Barton Fink	
1992	Mac	Niccolò Vitelli	Also director and writer
1992	Brain Donors	Roland T. Flakfizer	
1993	Fearless	Bill Pearlman	
1994	Being Human	Lucinnius	
1994	Quiz Show	Herb Stempel	
1994	The Search for One-eye Jimmy	Disco Bean	
1995	Search and Destroy	Ron	
1995	Unstrung Heroes	Sidney Lidz	
1995	Clockers	Detective Larry Mazilli	
1996	Girl 6	Murray	
1996	Box of Moonlight	Al Fountain	
1996	Grace of My Heart	Joel Milner	
1997	Lesser Prophets	Leon	
1997	The Truce	Primo Levi	
1998	Illuminata	Tuccio	Also director, writer and producer
1998	Rounders	Joey Knish	
1998	He Got Game	Billy Sunday	
1998	OK Garage	Jonny	
1998	The Big Lebowski	Jesus Quintana	
1998	Animals	Tuxedo Man	
1999	Summer of Sam	Harvey the Dog (voice)	
1999	Cradle Will Rock	Aldo Silvana	
2000	O Brother, Where Art Thou?	Pete	
2000	The Man Who Cried	Dante Dominio	
2000	Company Man	Crocker Johnson	
2000	Two Thousand and None	Benjamin Kasparian	
2000	The Luzhin Defence	Alexander Luzhin	
2001	Monkeybone	Monkeybone (voice)	
2001	Thirteen Conversations About One Thing	Walker	
2002	Collateral Damage	Sean Armstrong	
2002	Mr. Deeds	Emilio Lopez	
2003	Fear X	Harry	
2003	Anger Management	Chuck	
2003	Opopomoz	John (voice)	
2004	Secret Passage	Paolo Zane	
2004	Secret Window	John Shooter	
2004	She Hate Me	Don Angelo Bonasera	
2004	2BPerfectlyHonest	Sal / Roberto	
2005	Romance and Cigarettes	Male Dancer & Singer	Also director, writer and producer
2005	The Moon and the Son: An Imagined Conversation	Son (voice)	Short film
2006	The Good Shepherd	Ray Brocco	
2006	A Few Days in September	William Pound	
2007	Transformers	Agent Seymour Simmons	
2007	Margot at the Wedding	Jim	
2007	Slipstream	Harvey Brickman	
2007	Joulutarina	Iisakki (voice)	English dub
2008	What Just Happened	Dick Bell	
2008	You Don't Mess with the Zohan	Fatoush 'The Phantom' Hakbarah	
2008	Miracle at St. Anna	Detective Antonio 'Tony' Ricci	
2009	The Taking of Pelham 123	Lieutenant Vincent Camonetti	
2009	Transformers: Revenge of the Fallen	Seymour Simmons	
2009	Rehearsal for a Sicilian Tragedy	Himself	Documentary; also writer and executive producer
2010	Passione	Himself / narrator	Documentary; also director and co-writer
2010	The Nutcracker in 3D	The Rat King	
2011	Cars 2	Francesco Bernoulli (voice)	
2011	Transformers: Dark of the Moon	Seymour Simmons	
2011	Somewhere Tonight	Leroy	
2013	Fading Gigolo	Fioravante	Also director and writer
2013	Gods Behaving Badly	Hades	
2014	God's Pocket	Arthur 'Bird' Capezio	
2014	Exodus: Gods and Kings	Seti I	
2014	Rio, I Love You	Homem	Segment "Quando não há Mais Amor"; also director and writer
2015	Mia Madre	Barry Huggins	
2015	Partly Cloudy with Sunny Spells	Lombelli	
2015	The Ridiculous 6	Abner Doubleday	
2016	Hands of Stone	Frankie Carbo	
2017	Landline	Alan Jacobs	
2017	Hair	Himself	Short film; also director and writer
2017	Transformers: The Last Knight	Seymour Simmons	
2018	Gloria Bell	Arnold	
2019	The True Adventures of Wolfboy	Mr. Silk	
2019	The Jesus Rolls	Jesus Quintana	Also director and writer
2022	The Batman	Carmine Falcone	
2022	Guillermo del Toro's Pinocchio	Dottore (voice)	
2022	Forty Winks	Milo	
2024	The Room Next Door	Damian Cunningham	
2024	The Cut	Boz	
2026	The Only Living Pickpocket in New York	Harry Lehman	
2026	A Statement	David J. Rose	Completed
2027	Gatto	Capitano Briganti	Post-production

=== Television ===
Year	Title	Role	Notes
1985	Miami Vice	David Traynor	Episode: "Rites of Passage"
1988	The Fortunate Pilgrim	Larry	4 episodes
1994	Saturday Night Live	Himself / host	Episode: "John Turturro/Tom Petty & the Heartbreakers"
1995	Sugartime	Sam Giancana	Television film
2001	Biography	Narrator	2 episodes
2002	Monday Night Mayhem	Howard Cosell	Television film
2002	Frasier	Grant (voice)	Episode: "Don't Go Breaking My Heart"
2004–08	Monk	Ambrose Monk	3 episodes
2007	The Bronx Is Burning	Billy Martin	8 episodes
2007	Flight of the Conchords	Credits Cop	Episode: "The Actor"
2016	The New Yorker Presents	Patient	Episode: "#1.8"
2016	The Night Of	John Stone	8 episodes
2017	Difficult People	Dusty	Episode: "Bernie and Blythe"
2019	The Name of the Rose	William of Baskerville	8 episodes; also writer and executive producer
2019	Green Eggs and Ham	Goat (voice)	6 episodes
2020	The Plot Against America	Rabbi Lionel Bengelsdorf	6 episodes
2022–present	Severance	Irving Bailiff	Main role
2024	Mr. & Mrs. Smith	Eric Shane	Episode: "Second Date"

=== Theater ===
Year	Title	Role	Venue	Ref.
1983	Danny and the Deep Blue Sea	Danny	Circle in the Square Theatre, Off-Broadway	
1998	Waiting for Godot	Estragon	Classic Stage Company, Off-Broadway	
2003	Life x 3	Henry	Circle in the Square Theatre, Broadway	
2007	A Spanish Play	Director	Classic Stage Company, Off-Broadway	
2011	The Cherry Orchard	Yermolai Alekaseyevich Lopakhin	Classic Stage Company, Off-Broadway	
2011–12	Relatively Speaking	Director	Brooks Atkinson Theatre, Broadway	
2013	The Master Builder	Halvard Solness	Brooklyn Academy of Music, Brooklyn	
2015	Zorba!	Zorba	New York City Center, Concert Staging	
2023	Sabbath's Theater	Mickey Sabbath	Signature Theatre Company, Off-Broadway	
2026-2027	Rhinoceros	Bérenger	American Repertory Theater; Todd Haimes Theatre	

=== Audiobooks ===
Year	Title	Voice role	Notes
2007	World War Z	Serosha Garcia Alvarez	

== Awards and nominations ==
Organizations	Year	Category	Work	Result	Ref.
Berlin International Film Festival	2006	Silver Berlin Bear	The Good Shepherd	Won	
Cannes Film Festival	1991	Best Actor	Barton Fink	Won	
Cannes Film Festival	1992	Caméra d'Or	Mac	Won	
Cannes Film Festival	1998	Palme d'Or	Illuminata	Nominated	
Chicago Film Critics Association	1991	Best Actor	Barton Fink	Nominated	
Chicago Film Critics Association	1994	Best Supporting Actor	Quiz Show	Nominated	
Critics' Choice Television Awards	2020	Best Supporting Actor in a Movie/Miniseries	The Plot Against America	Nominated	
Drama Desk Award	2005	Best Actor in a Play	The Sound of Naples	Nominated	
Golden Globe Awards	1994	Best Supporting Actor – Motion Picture	Quiz Show	Nominated	
Golden Globe Awards	2016	Best Actor – Miniseries or TV Movie	The Night Of	Nominated	
Golden Globe Awards	2022	Best Supporting Actor – Series, Miniseries or Television Film	Severance	Nominated	
Gotham Awards	1991	Best Actor	Himself	Won	
Gotham Awards	2007	Best Ensemble Performance	Margot at the Wedding	Nominated	
Independent Spirit Award	1989	Best Supporting Actor	Five Corners	Nominated	
Independent Spirit Award	1994	Best First Feature	Mac	Nominated	
Independent Spirit Award	1994	Best Director	Mac	Nominated	
Independent Spirit Award	1998	Best Male	Box of Moonlight	Nominated	
National Society of Film Critics	1990	Best Supporting Actor	Miller's Crossing	Nominated	
New York Film Critics Circle	1990	Best Supporting Actor	Miller's Crossing	Nominated	
Primetime Emmy Awards	2004	Outstanding Guest Actor in a Comedy Series	Monk (episode: "Mr. Monk and the Three Pies")	Won	
Primetime Emmy Awards	2017	Outstanding Lead Actor in a Limited Series or Movie	The Night Of	Nominated	
Primetime Emmy Awards	2022	Outstanding Supporting Actor in a Drama Series	Severance (episode: "Defiant Jazz")	Nominated	
Primetime Emmy Awards	2024	Outstanding Guest Actor in a Drama Series	Mr. & Mrs. Smith (episode: "Second Date")	Nominated	
Primetime Emmy Awards	2025	Outstanding Supporting Actor in a Drama Series	Severance (episode: "Woe's Hollow")	Nominated	
Sarajevo Film Festival	2024	Honorary Heart of Sarajevo Award	Himself	Won	
Saturn Awards	2022	Best Supporting Actor on Television	Severance	Nominated	
Screen Actors Guild Award	1994	Best Supporting Actor	Quiz Show	Nominated	
Screen Actors Guild Award	2003	Best Actor in a Miniseries or TV Movie	Monday Night Mayhem	Nominated	
Screen Actors Guild Award	2016	Best Actor in a Miniseries or TV Movie	The Night Of	Nominated	
Screen Actors Guild Award	2022	Outstanding Ensemble in a Drama Series	Severance	Nominated	
Screen Actors Guild Award	2026	Outstanding Ensemble in a Drama Series	Severance	Nominated	
Stockholm International Film Festival	2026	Stockholm Achievement Award	For distinguished acting career	Honoured	
Sundance Film Festival	1992	Vision Award	Himself	Won	
Venice Film Festival	2005	Golden Lion	Romance and Cigarettes	Nominated	
Venice Film Festival	2010	Award of the City of Rome	Passione	Won	
Zurich Film Festival	2026	Golden Eye	The Only Living Pickpocket in New York	Honoured	
