= Miller's Crossing =

1990 film by the Coen Brothers

- Theatrical release poster
- Directed by: Joel Coen (Note: Although the Coen brothers co-directed this film, Joel received sole credit due to Directors Guild of America regulations)
- Written by: Joel Coen; Ethan Coen
- Produced by: Ethan Coen (Note: Although the Coen brothers both produced this film, Ethan received sole credit due to Directors Guild of America regulations)
- Starring: Gabriel Byrne; Marcia Gay Harden; John Turturro; Jon Polito; J. E. Freeman; Albert Finney
- Cinematography: Barry Sonnenfeld
- Edited by: Michael R. Miller
- Music by: Carter Burwell
- Production company: Circle Films
- Distributed by: 20th Century Fox
- Release dates: September 21, 1990 (New York); September 22, 1990 (U.S.)
- Running time: 115 minutes
- Country: United States
- Language: English
- Budget: $10–14 million
- Box office: $5 million

Miller's Crossing is a 1990 American neo-noir gangster film written, directed and produced by Joel and Ethan Coen, and starring Gabriel Byrne, Marcia Gay Harden, John Turturro, Jon Polito, J. E. Freeman, and Albert Finney. The plot concerns a power struggle between two rival gangs and how the protagonist, Tom Reagan (Byrne), plays both sides against each other.

The film premiered at the 1990 New York Film Festival, and received a limited release in the United States on September 22, 1990. Though a commercial disappointment, it was acclaimed by critics. In 2005, Time chose Miller's Crossing as one of the 100 greatest films made since the inception of the periodical.

== Plot ==
In 1929, Tom Reagan is the right-hand man for Irish mobster Leo O'Bannon, a political boss who runs an unnamed U.S. city during Prohibition. Leo sets off a mob war when he extends protection to his girlfriend Verna's brother, a bookie named Bernie Bernbaum, who is skimming off the match fixing scheme of Leo's rival, the Italian mafioso Johnny Caspar. The situation is further complicated by the fact that behind Leo's back, Verna is also sleeping with Tom.

Despite his own relationship with Verna, Tom presses Leo to give up her brother to Caspar. When the war heats up, with an assassination attempt on Leo, Tom tries to persuade Leo that he is foolish to protect Bernie on Verna's behalf, making the point by revealing his affair with her. Leo publicly beats Tom and cuts ties with both him and Verna.

Cast out and needing work, Tom turns to Caspar. As a loyalty test, Caspar demands Tom reveal Bernie's location. Although he readily discloses this, he's shocked to find that a follow-up test is for him to kill Bernie personally.

With Caspar's henchmen in tow, Tom leads Bernie to his execution in the woods at a spot called Miller's Crossing. Bernie grovels for his life and desperately begs Tom not to kill him. Tom fakes the killing by firing his gun into the ground and orders Bernie to leave town. Caspar's henchmen, who are within earshot but cannot see the two men, are fooled and neglect to check for the body before leaving with Tom.

With Leo weakened, Caspar takes his place as city boss, controlling the police and using them to destroy Leo's operations.

Within Caspar's gang, there is tension between Tom and Caspar's trusted enforcer, the brutal Eddie Dane ("the Dane"). Upon learning that his men did not actually see Tom kill Bernie, the Dane takes Tom back to Miller's Crossing to verify that Bernie's body is there. Tom expects to find no corpse and to be executed for it, but instead the group finds a decomposing body that had been shot in the face and disfigured beyond recognition by birds. The Dane and his men assume the body is that of Bernie, but it is actually that of the Dane's lover Mink, whom Bernie had secretly killed and placed as a decoy where his own body should have been. Tom is now vulnerable if the Dane or Caspar discovers the identity of the body, a fact that Bernie uses in an attempt to blackmail Tom into killing Caspar.

With Bernie supposedly dead, someone continues to cut into Caspar's match fix, and Tom and the Dane each try to convince Caspar that the other is behind it. Tom uses Mink's sudden disappearance to sow suspicion about the Dane by insinuating that Mink has gone into hiding after he and the Dane betrayed Caspar. Caspar must decide between Tom and the Dane, a dilemma he resolves by shooting the Dane in the head as Tom looks on.

Tom then thins out his rivals by engineering a surprise meeting between Bernie and Caspar, knowing that the first one to be seen by the other is likely to be killed. Shortly after the arranged time, Tom arrives to discover that Bernie has killed Caspar. Tom tricks Bernie into surrendering his gun and declares his intent to kill him in retribution for his blackmail. Bernie again begs for mercy, but Tom rejects his plea and shoots and kills him.

With Caspar and the Dane dead, Leo resumes his post as the only boss in town. At Bernie's burial, Verna, now back in Leo's good graces, reacts coldly to Tom and walks back to her car. Leo notifies Tom that Verna has proposed to marry him. He offers Tom his job back but Tom turns him down and stays behind, watching Leo as he walks away.

== Cast ==
- Gabriel Byrne as Tom Reagan
- Albert Finney as Liam "Leo" O'Bannon
  - Finney also makes a background appearance in drag as a matron in O'Bannon's club
- John Turturro as Bernie Bernbaum
- Marcia Gay Harden as Verna Bernbaum
- Jon Polito as Giovanni “Johnny Caspar” Gasparo
- J. E. Freeman as Eddie Dane
- Steve Buscemi as "Mink" Larouie
- Michael Jeter as Adolph
- Mike Starr as Frankie
- Olek Krupa as Tad
- John McConnell as Officer Bryan
- Danny Aiello III as Officer Delahunty
- Al Mancini as "Tic-Tac"
- Richard Woods as Mayor Dale Levander
- Lanny Flaherty as Terry
- Tom Toner as O’Doole
- Mario Todisco as Clarence “Drop” Johnson
- Michael Badalucco as Sal
- Salvatore H. Tornabene as "Rug" Daniels
- Jeanette Kontomitras as Mrs. Caspar
- Louis Charles Mounicou III as Johnny Caspar, Jr.

Additionally, Sam Raimi makes a cameo appearance as the snickering gunman, and Frances McDormand appears (uncredited) as Mayor Levander's secretary.

== Production ==
=== Development ===
While writing the screenplay, the Coen brothers tentatively titled the film The Bighead—their nickname for Tom Reagan. The first image they conceived was that of a black hat coming to rest in a forest clearing; then, a gust of wind lifts it into the air, sending it flying down an avenue of trees. This image closes the film's opening credit sequence.

Because of the intricate, dense plot, the Coens suffered from writer's block with the script. They stayed with a close friend of theirs at the time, William Preston Robertson in Saint Paul, Minnesota, hoping that a change of scenery might help. After watching the romantic comedy Baby Boom one night, they returned to New York City and wrote Barton Fink (in three weeks) before resuming the Miller's Crossing screenplay.

The budget was reported by film industry magazines as around $14 million, but the Coens have said that the film cost "substantially less" than that.

=== Casting ===
According to Paul Coughlin, "The casting of Byrne allows for the psychological assurance, self-confidence and icy demeanour to be physically reproduced in the sturdy and unruffled presence of the tall and lean actor. Tom is 'a man who walks behind a man, whispers in his ear', he is the brains behind Leo's operation, and he is the heartless centre of Miller's Crossing." Although Byrne was a native Irishman playing a lieutenant to an Irish mobster, the Coens did not originally want him to use his own accent in the film. Byrne argued that his dialogue was structured in such a way that it was a good fit for his accent, and after he tried it the Coens agreed. Kyle MacLachlan also auditioned for the role, but believed he was passed on for being too young and not "hardened" enough.

During casting they had envisioned Trey Wilson (who played Nathan Arizona in their previous film Raising Arizona) as Irish gang boss Leo O'Bannon, but two weeks before principal photography began, Wilson died from a brain hemorrhage and Finney was cast. Roger Westcombe calls Finney's portrayal of Leo "perfectly nuanced in a brilliant performance". Finney also appears in a cameo, as an elderly female ladies' room attendant.

The Coens cast family and friends in minor roles. Director Sam Raimi – a friend of the Coens – appears as the snickering gunman at the siege of the Sons of Erin social club, while Frances McDormand – Joel's wife – appears as the mayor's secretary. The role of The Swede was written for Peter Stormare, but he was busy playing Hamlet (a role often referred to as "The Dane"). J. E. Freeman was cast and the name of the character was changed to The Dane, while Stormare went on to be featured in Fargo and The Big Lebowski.

=== Filming ===
The city in which the story takes place is unidentified but the film was shot in New Orleans, as the Coen Brothers were attracted to its look. Ethan Coen commented in an interview, "There are whole neighborhoods here of nothing but 1929 architecture. New Orleans is sort of a depressed city; it hasn't been gentrified. There's a lot of architecture that hasn't been touched, store-front windows that haven't been replaced in the last sixty years."

Principal photography ran from January 27 to April 28, 1989. Shooting locations included the International House Hotel (as the "Shenandoah Club"), McGehee School (as the exterior of Johnny Caspar's house), and Gallier Hall. The titular "Miller's Crossing" was filmed at a forest plantation near Hammond.

== Themes ==
=== Tom's Hat ===
A recurring theme throughout the movie is Tom either searching for or losing his hat.

The first shot of the movie sees Tom's hat being blown by a breeze through a forest (presumably Miller's Crossing). The topic of his hat recurs throughout the movie; one of the earliest scenes shows him asking a friend about its whereabouts after a drunken night, his showing up at Verna's door to retrieve it, and a later conversation with Verna about a dream he'd had about it.

"There's nothing more foolish than a man chasing his hat," he says."

There is some argument about what the hat is meant to represent, but a generally accepted theory is that it represents his control over his circumstances or dignity. His constant drinking leads to its loss, Verna gains possession of it, and it's flung at him after a vicious public beating from Leo.

=== Homosexuality ===
While rarely stated directly, it's heavily implied or referred to that Bernie, the Mink, and the Dane are entwined in a love triangle. Tom uses this as a tool for leverage over Mink and Caspar.

== Influences ==
Christopher Orr sees the opening scene, in which Johnny Caspar (Jon Polito) confronts Leo O'Bannon (Albert Finney) and Tom Reagan (Gabriel Byrne) as "an obvious nod to the opening of The Godfather".

Roger Westcombe finds the title sequence of a fedora being blown off its bed of fallen leaves in the forest to be a subtle homage to Jean-Pierre Melville's crime film Le Doulos (1962), which ends with the gangster protagonist's fate underlined wistfully by the shot of his fedora coming to rest, alone in the frame, in the soil of the forest floor.

Miller's Crossing quotes many gangster films and films noir. Many situations, characters and dialogue are derived from the work of Dashiell Hammett, particularly his 1931 novel The Glass Key. There are some parallels between the two stories and many scenes and lines are lifted from this novel. The relationship between Tom and Leo in the film mirrors the relationship between Ned Beaumont and Paul Madvig, the principal characters of the Hammett novel. Another important Hammett source was his 1929 novel Red Harvest, which details the story of a gang war in a corrupt Prohibition-era American city, a war initiated by the machinations of the main character. While Miller's Crossing follows the plot and main characters of The Glass Key fairly closely, the film has no direct scenes, characters, or dialogue from Red Harvest except for using a fixed boxing fight as a plot device.

Orr also notes, "The ending of Miller's Crossing makes even clearer reference to the immaculate final scene of The Third Man: a funeral, a protagonist abandoned by his car, who watches as the last person he cares for in the world walks away down a dirt road hemmed by trees".

== Release ==
Miller's Crossing opened in limited release in New York City on September 22, 1990, after premiering at the New York Film Festival the day before.

== Reception ==
=== Box office ===
On initial release, the film was a box-office failure at the time, making slightly more than $5 million, out of its $10–14 million budget.

=== Critical response ===
On review aggregator Rotten Tomatoes, the film has an approval rating of 93% based on 71 reviews, with an average rating of 8.2/10. The website's critical consensus reads, "Though possibly more notable for its distinctive style than an airtight story, this Coen brothers' take on the classic gangster flick features sharp dialogue, impressive cinematography, and a typically quirky cast of characters." On Metacritic, the film has a weighted average score of 76 out of 100, indicating "generally favorable reviews". Audiences polled by CinemaScore gave the film an average grade of "C-" on an A+ to F scale.

Film critic David Thomson calls the film "a superb, languid fantasia on the theme of the gangster film that repays endless viewing". Of Turturro's performance he says, "This could be the finest work of one of our best supporting actors". Roger Ebert gave it 3/4 stars, stating, "It is likely to be most appreciated by movie lovers who will enjoy its resonance with films of the past." Frank Moraes says, "Gabriel Byrne does an excellent job in this film, ... this film lives and dies on his performance".

Cahiers du Cinéma ranked Miller's Crossing at No. 2 on its Annual Top 10 List for 1991.

=== Retrospective reviews ===
In 2005, Time chose Miller's Crossing as one of the 100 greatest films made since the inception of the periodical. Time critic Richard Corliss called it a "noir with a touch so light, the film seems to float on the breeze like the frisbee of a fedora sailing through the forest".Total Film also placed it in their top 100 list in 2013.

In 2010, The Guardian called it the 24th best crime movie of all time.

Taking particular note of the work of cinematographer Barry Sonnenfeld and production designer Dennis Gassner, The Atlantic's Christopher Orr observed in 2024, "Miller's Crossing is an aesthetic pleasure of the highest order on nearly every level".

=== Accolades ===
Institution	Year	Category	Nominee(s)	Result
Belgian Film Critics Association	1992	Grand Prix	—N/a	Nominated
Cahiers du Cinéma	1991	Annual Top 10 Lists	—N/a	2nd place
Casting Society of America	1991	Best Casting for a Feature Film, Drama	Donna Isaacson, John S. Lyons	Nominated
Chicago Film Critics Association	1991	Best Screenplay	Joel Coen, Ethan Coen	Nominated
Dallas–Fort Worth Film Critics Association	1991	Best Film	—N/a	Nominated
National Board of Review	1990	Top Ten Films	—N/a	Won
National Society of Film Critics	1991	Best Supporting Actor	John Turturro	3rd place
New York Film Critics Circle	1990	Best Supporting Actor	John Turturro	Nominated
San Sebastián International Film Festival	1990	Golden Shell	Joel Coen	Nominated
San Sebastián International Film Festival	1990	Best Director	Joel Coen	Won
Stockholm International Film Festival	1990	Bronze Horse	Joel Coen	Won
Yubari International Fantastic Film Festival	1991	Critics' Award	Joel Coen	Won

== Soundtrack ==
Original Motion Picture Soundtrack: Miller's Crossing

Soundtrack album by Carter Burwell
- Released: October 17, 1990
- Genre: Film score
- Length: 28:03
- Label: Varèse Sarabande

Professional ratings
Review scores
Source	Rating
AllMusic	4/5 stars

The score was written by Carter Burwell, his third collaboration with the Coen brothers. The main theme is based on the Irish folk ballad "Lament for Limerick". Burwell takes a traditional piece of music with some culturally relevant connection and uses it as the central motif of the broader arrangement. The main theme has been utilized in trailers for a number of other films, including The Shawshank Redemption, as well as in an ad for Caffrey's Irish Ale.

The soundtrack includes jazz tunes, such as "King Porter Stomp", reflective of the era in which the film is set. Other songs include "Danny Boy", sung by Frank Patterson, an Irish tenor, which is heard in Leo's house. Patterson can also be heard singing Jimmy Campbell's "Goodnight Sweetheart" in a scene in the Shenandoah Club.

=== Track listing ===
1. "Opening Titles" – 1:53
2. "Caspar Laid Out" – 1:57
3. "A Man and His Hat" – 0:56
4. "King Porter Stomp" (performed by Jelly Roll Morton) – 2:09
5. "The Long Way Around" – 1:39
6. "Miller's Crossing" – 2:35
7. "After Miller's Crossing" – 0:42
8. "Runnin' Wild" (performed by Joe Grey) – 3:06
9. "Rage of the Dane" – 0:05
10. "All a You Whores" – 0:24
11. "Nightmare in the Trophy Room" – 1:37
12. "He Didn't Like His Friends" – 0:24
13. "Danny Boy" (performed by Frank Patterson) – 4:05
14. "What Heart?" – 0:49
15. "End Titles" – 4:44
16. "Goodnight Sweetheart" (performed by Frank Patterson) – 0:54

== Legacy ==
The Sopranos pays homage to Miller's Crossing, particularly in the "Pine Barrens" episode.

== See also ==
Two other gangster films released in the same year as Miller's Crossing:

- Goodfellas
- The Godfather Part III
