= Meowth =

Pokémon species

- Pokémon character
- Meowth artwork by Ken Sugimori
- First game: Pokémon Red and Blue (1996)
- Voiced by: Various: Inuko Inuyama (Japanese); Matthew Sussman (4Kids, Season 1; 31 episodes); Maddie Blaustein (4Kids, Seasons 1–8); James Carter Cathcart (TPCi, Seasons 9–25)

In-universe information
- Species: Pokémon
- Type: Normal; Dark (Alolan); Steel (Galarian)

Meowth (/miː.ˈaʊθ/, mee-OW-th), known in Japanese as Nyarth (Japanese: ニャース), is a Pokémon species in Nintendo and Game Freak's Pokémon media franchise, and the first stage of its evolved form, Persian. First introduced in the video games Pokémon Red and Blue, it has received multiple new forms, including regional variants called Alolan Meowth and Galarian Meowth in Pokémon Sun and Moon and Pokémon Sword and Shield respectively. These two forms are Dark and Steel as opposed to Meowth's Normal form. Sword and Shield also introduced a giant-sized Meowth transformation that causes it to become very long, called Gigantamax Meowth.

It has appeared in multiple games including Pokémon Go and the Pokémon Trading Card Game, as well as various merchandise. Meowth has multiple voice actors, including by Inuko Inuyama, Matthew Sussman, Maddie Blaustein, and James Carter Cathcart. The original Meowth is based on the Maneki-neko, being bipedal with white fur and a gold koban coin on its forehead. Meanwhile, Alolan Meowth has blueish grey fur, while Galarian Meowth has greyish-brown fur and a bushy beard.

In the Pokémon TV series, Meowth is one of the main characters and a recurring antagonist, along with partners Jessie and James, all three belonging to the criminal organization Team Rocket. Introduced in the second episode, the three have appeared in most episodes, typically attempting to steal the Pokémon Pikachu from protagonist Ash Ketchum. This Meowth is capable of human speech, a rarity among Pokémon, having taken the time to learn it. Meowth has received generally positive reception, its role in the anime being a significant contribution to its popularity in the games.

== Conception and development ==
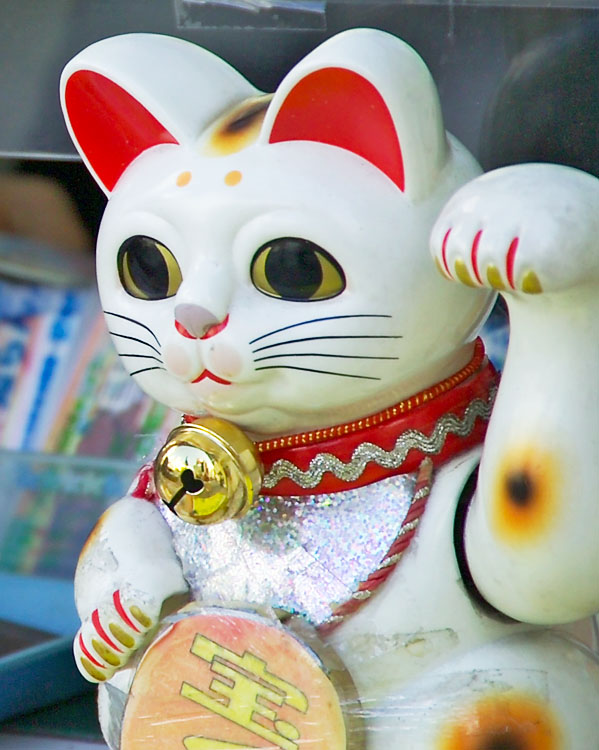
Meowth's design was inspired by the Japanese good luck charm maneki-neko.

Meowth is a species of fictional creatures called Pokémon created for the Pokémon media franchise. Developed by Game Freak and published by Nintendo, the Japanese franchise began in 1996 with the video games Pokémon Red and Green for the Game Boy, which were later released in North America as Pokémon Red and Blue in 1998. In these games and their sequels, the player assumes the role of a Trainer whose goal is to capture and use the creatures' special abilities to combat other Pokémon. Some Pokémon can transform into stronger species through a process called evolution via various means, such as exposure to specific items. Each Pokémon has one or two elemental types, which define its advantages and disadvantages when battling other Pokémon. A major goal in each game is to complete the Pokédex, a comprehensive Pokémon encyclopedia, by capturing, evolving, and trading with other Trainers to obtain individuals from all Pokémon species. Meowth is a Normal-type Pokémon which can evolve into Persian via training. Its Japanese name, Nyarth, comes from a Japanese proverb about a cat unknowingly having money on its head, which is meant to impart the importance of money. Series creator Satoshi Tajiri stated that there was no similar concept to this in the United States, and thus its name was changed to Meowth.

Meowth has received various new forms and evolutions, most of which were used in the final version of the series. In the sequel, Pokémon Gold and Silver, a new pre-evolution form of Meowth was planned, but was ultimately cut before the final release. This form has a five-yen coin on its head. During the development of sequel titles Pokémon Sun and Moon, "Alolan form" variants of several existing Pokémon were introduced, meant to be tied thematically to the game's region, which was modeled after Hawaii. Both Meowth and Persian received Alolan forms, which give them a new Dark type instead of its Normal type. Like Meowth, it also evolves into Persian, which is also newly Dark type. In Pokémon Sword and Shield, Meowth is given two new forms. The first is a special transformation called a Gigantamax form, which causes Meowth to both grow to incredible heights and become very long. The second is called Galarian Meowth, a Steel-type Pokémon that evolves into a new Pokémon called Perrserker instead of Persian.

=== Voice ===
In the Pokémon TV series, Meowth has had multiple voice actors. In Japan, Meowth has been voiced by Inuko Inuyama. In the Japanese version, Meowth uses the unusual first-person pronoun "nyā." and its original English voice actor was Matthew Sussman. When auditioning for Meowth, Sussman imagined Meowth as a combination of a gangster from old movies and Jerry Lewis due to the character being described as someone who thinks he is a tough guy, but is "just this little cat." He was initially unaware that other Pokémon could not communicate like Meowth. Meowth features a "nasal-yet-swarthy" voice that, according to Them.us writer David Levesley, conveys that he may be the runt of the litter but still have seen some things in his life. Sussman portrayed Meowth for 31 episodes before leaving the role due to receiving a promising stage play opportunity and not being able to record remotely. When he returned, Sussman stated that the producers indicated that they did not want to confuse viewers by switching back from the actor who replaced him, though he felt that it was just for convenience's sake. He was replaced by Maddie Blaustein, who was instructed to base her performance on Sussman's. After her death, Blaustein was replaced by James Carter Cathcart in 2006, who portrayed him until his retirement in 2023.

=== Design ===
Meowth is a sand-colored bipedal cat with a gold koban coin on its head. It is based on the Japanese good luck charm maneki-neko. The Alolan form of Meowth has a similar design, except it has bigger ears, blue/grey fur, and a more relaxed disposition. Its disposition came from being a favorite Pokémon of royalty before becoming a wild Pokémon after the destruction of the royalty. The Galarian form of Meowth, meanwhile, has grey iron fur, a beard, and sharp teeth.

== Appearances ==
=== In video games ===
Meowth gained two new forms in later games, whose designs differ.

First found in Pokémon Red and Blue, Meowth has appeared in most Pokémon titles since, including every major game. It is only available in Red through trading. It appears in Pokémon Yellow as an enemy along the characters Jessie and James of Team Rocket; however, it cannot be obtained in the wild, and can only be obtained via trading. The regular Meowth was omitted from the games Pokémon Sun and Moon outside of trading. Instead, the only form accessible is its Alolan form. In Pokémon Sword and Shield, Galarian Meowth can be found in the wild, while the regular Meowth form can be obtained by trading a Galarian Meowth for it. Regular Meowth is capable of transforming into Gigantamax Meowth in these games as well.

Meowth appears in other spin-off games, including Pokémon Snap, and Pokémon Mystery Dungeon, where the player can either play as a Meowth or make their partner Meowth. It can also be found in Pokémon Pinball as a captureable Pokémon and with a bonus stage themed after itself. In Pokémon Channel, Meowth appears as a TV news reporter alongside Psyduck. All three regional variants have appeared in the mobile game Pokémon Go and in the Pokémon Trading Card Game. In Pokémon Go, the characters Jessie and James appear at times riding in the Meowth balloon seen in the anime. An adaptation of the card game for the Game Boy Color, titled Pokémon Trading Card Game, came with a promotional Meowth card included in the box. A tech demo for the GameCube titled Meowth's Party was shown at a Nintendo Space World conference, which featured the Pokémon TV series song "Nyasu no Party", which was used as an ending credits theme in the series.

Meowth appears in Super Smash Bros. for the Nintendo 64 as a Poké Ball Pokémon that can be summoned to aide the summoner in battle, scattering coins around itself that damage opponents. Meowth appears in Super Smash Bros. Melee as a collectible trophy, based on his appearance in the Meowth's Party tech demo. In Super Smash Bros. Brawl, Meowth once again appears as a Poké Ball Pokémon, its attack shooting coins in a direction instead of all around itself like in the Nintendo 64 game. This same summon was featured in Super Smash Bros. for Nintendo 3DS and Wii U, as well as in Super Smash Bros. Ultimate. Rumors existed that Meowth was considered for inclusion as a playable character in Super Smash Bros., but this has neither been confirmed nor denied by series creator Masahiro Sakurai.

=== In the anime ===
In the Pokémon TV series, Meowth is a member of Team Rocket alongside Jessie and James. They are introduced in the second episode, and appear in most episodes following it. The trio's goal is typically to capture Pikachu, the Starter Pokémon of the protagonist Ash Ketchum. They use a Meowth-themed balloon to travel, and often wear disguises as part of their plans. While most Pokémon are not able to communicate with humans, Meowth is, having learned it after he met a female Meowth and wanted to impress her. In the Galar region, Meowth is able to transform into the species' Gigantamax form. Near the end of Ash Ketchum's journey, the trio reunite with all the Pokémon they caught over the years, choosing to make a last attempt to capture Pikachu, only to fail. After this failure, they consider breaking up, but stick together in the end, showing them continuing to pursue Ash and his Pikachu.

== Promotion and merchandise ==
Meowth has also been made into several different toys, including figures and plush toys.

As one of the most popular characters from the Pokémon franchise, Meowth has been featured in various promotional events as well as collectible items. It was among eleven Pokémon selected as Japan's mascot for the 2014 FIFA World Cup. The Meowth balloon was featured at a promotion for the film Pokémon the Movie: I Choose You! at Urban Dock LaLaport Toyosu in Tokyo. In 2022, Meowth, along with other feline Pokémon species was featured on a three-dimensional electronic billboard in Japan to commemorate International Cat Day which is celebrated in August.

== Critical reception ==
Meowth has received generally positive reception, with author Harry Schlesinger stating that Meowth was particularly popular among girls. NintendoLife [writer] discussed how he enjoys the Pokémon for its greed and design. Meanwhile, [writer] argued that its anime personality made it iconic, rather than itself being iconic, while [writer] stated that its Gigantamax form was "fantastic." Nintendo World Report writer Andrew Brown considered him among the best Pokémon species, stating that he loves every aspect of Meowth in both its anime and game incarnations. He appreciated how much of Japanese culture is represented in Meowth's design and lore, particularly that it collects items, being lucky, and being attracted to round objects. Shack News writer Brittany Vincent regarded it as her favorite Pokémon, stating that she was a fan of both the anime and video game incarnation of it to the point that she picked Pokémon Blue to make sure she got a Meowth. Her love of cats was a large factor in her enjoyment of Meowth, stating that she was collecting Meowth merchandise even before the series became popular.

Meowth has been generally well received, described by GameSpot staff as among the most popular Pokémon. Destructoid writer Marcel Hoang considered Galarian Meowth his favorite Pokémon in Sword and Shield, calling regular Meowth a "baseline" and considering Alolan Meowth a good demonstration of how regional forms can be interesting. He felt that Meowth's "street cat flavor" was enhanced significantly to the point of making Galarian Meowth almost feral. TheGamer writer Stacey Henley was frustrated by the propensity of generation I Pokémon getting regional forms, Meowth in particular due to the fact that it got two different regional forms. She believed that Meowth getting its Alolan form was acceptable but not a necessary one due to its popularity in the anime. On its Galarian form, she felt that Meowth having four new forms with Alolan Meowth and Persian, Galarian Meowth, and Perrserker was stupid. The baby form that was cut from Gold and Silver was a popular design with fans. Multiple critics drew a comparison between Meowth's Gigantamax form and the Longcat meme.

=== Anime incarnation ===
The anime incarnation of Meowth has received positive reception, with IGN staff stating that its popularity in the anime resulted in it being popular for players in the games. Kotaku writer Sisi Jiang believed that Meowth, along with Jessie and James, was a contributing factor in the anime's popularity. Dot Esports writer Gökhan Çakır felt that he was a memorable character, stating that his sense of humor was influential. Nintendo World Report writer Pedro Hernandez attributed his enjoyment of the anime to the team, praising Meowth for his "humor, wit, and snark." He stated that he had a Meowth in his game party because of the anime role, wanting to take a "little bit of the TV series" into the game. GamesRadar+ writer Lucas Sullivan felt that Meowth was nothing special, especially as more Pokémon have been introduced with each game, its only saving graces being the koban coin on its forehead and its appeal to cat fans. On the other hand, Sullivan found the anime incarnation significantly more interesting, finding its backstory of learning to speak tragic. Discussing Jessie and James' queer characterization, The Daily Beast writer Jay Castello stated that while he was the "token straight friend" of the Team Rocket trio, though found it notable that he was voiced by someone who was both intersex and transgender. Andrew Brown felt that Meowth had the most fleshed-out backstory, noting how notable it is that Meowth is both one of the only "bad guy" Pokémon and one of the only Pokémon that can speak English without telepathy. Connor Christie believed that Meowth was the most ubiquitous cat Pokémon, owing to its anime appearance and stating that it stood alongside Pikachu and Jigglypuff in terms of recognizability.

Blaustein's decision to come out of the closet and begin her gender transition into a woman was inspired by the episode "Go West, Young Meowth." This episode centers around Meowth attempting to learn English and stand upright to impress a female Meowth, only to be regarded as a "freak" by her, her friend comparing Blaustein's feelings of being a "woman trapped in a man's body" with Meowth's, stating that Meowth was a human trapped in a Pokémon's body.
