= Mac (film) =

1992 film co-written and directed by John Turturro

- DVD cover
- Directed by: John Turturro
- Written by: John Turturro; Brandon Cole
- Produced by: Brenda Goodman; Nancy Tenenbaum
- Starring: John Turturro; Michael Badalucco; Carl Capotorto; Katherine Borowitz; Ellen Barkin; John Amos
- Cinematography: Ron Fortunato
- Edited by: Michael Berenbaum
- Music by: Richard Termini; Vin Tese
- Distributed by: The Samuel Goldwyn Company
- Release date: February 19, 1993 (USA)
- Running time: 117 minutes
- Country: United States
- Languages: English; Polish; Italian
- Box office: $471,120 (USA)

Mac is a 1992 American drama film co-written and directed by John Turturro, in his directorial debut. It stars Turturro alongside Michael Badalucco, Katherine Borowitz, Carl Capotorto, Nicholas Turturro and Ellen Barkin. It won the Caméra d'Or award at the 1992 Cannes Film Festival and was nominated for an Independent Spirit Award.

== Synopsis ==
Niccolo (Mac) Vitelli is the oldest of three brothers and becomes the de facto head of their family after their father dies. Their father was in construction and the brothers follow in his footsteps. At first, they work for Polowski, who cuts corners and does not do an adequate job, as well as being verbally abusive to his employees with no pride in his work. This causes them to start their own company - Vitelli Brothers Construction, which will be the opposite of Polowski. Mac starts becoming a tyrannical workaholic with obsessive concern about the quality of their work with worrying attention to detail. His intensity and driven ambition pushes his brothers away and breaks the family apart.

== Cast ==
- John Turturro as Niccolo "Mac" Vitelli
  - James Madio as Young Niccolo "Mac" Vitelli
- Michael Badalucco as Vico Vitelli
- Katherine Borowitz as Alice Stunder
- Carl Capotorto as Bruno Vitelli
- Nicholas Turturro as Tony Gloves
- Matthew Sussman as Clarence
- Ellen Barkin as Oona Goldfarb
- Dennis Farina as Mr. Stunder
- Olek Krupa as Polowski
- Steven Randazzo as Gus
- Mike Starr as Firefighter
- Joe Paparone as Papa
- Aida Turturro as Wife
- Mario Todisco as Joe "The Mule"
- Harry Bugin as Patient
- Michael Imperioli
