= Illuminata (film) =

1998 film by John Turturro

- DVD cover
- Directed by: John Turturro
- Written by: Brandon Cole; John Turturro
- Based on: Imperfect Love by Brandon Cole
- Starring: Katherine Borowitz; Beverly D'Angelo; Ben Gazzara; Donal McCann; Susan Sarandon; Rufus Sewell; John Turturro; Christopher Walken
- Cinematography: Harris Savides
- Edited by: Michael Berenbaum
- Music by: Arnold Black; William Bolcom
- Distributed by: Artisan Entertainment
- Release dates: May 21, 1998 (Cannes Film Festival); April 28, 1999 (France); August 6, 1999 (U.S.)
- Running time: 119 minutes
- Country: United States
- Language: English
- Box office: $840,134

Illuminata is a 1998 American independent romantic comedy film directed by John Turturro and written by Brandon Cole and Turturro, based on Cole's play Imperfect Love. The cinematographer was Harris Savides. The puppet sequences were done by Roman Paska. Music for the 'Tuccio Operatic Dream Sequence' was composed by Richard Termini.

== Plot ==
The plot follows the backstage dramas of a turn-of-the-century New York theater company struggling to produce a new work.

== Cast ==
- John Turturro as Tuccio, the playwright
- Katherine Borowitz (Turturro's wife) as Rachel, Tuccio's girlfriend, an actress
- Beverly D'Angelo as Astergourd, a theater owner
- Donal McCann as Pallenchio, Astergourd's husband
- Georgina Cates as Simone, an actress
- Susan Sarandon as Celimene, an aging actress
- Christopher Walken as Umberto Bevalaqua, an influential theater critic
- Ben Gazzara as Old Flavio, an actor in the company
- Rufus Sewell as Dominique, a young actor in the company
- Bill Irwin as Marco, a bit player and the object of Bevalaqua's affections
- Aida Turturro as Marta
- Rocco Sisto as Prince
- Matthew Sussman as Piero

== Reception ==
Illumuinata holds a rating of 48% on Rotten Tomatoes from 27 reviews. Metacritic, which uses a weighted average, assigned the film a score of 60 out of 100, based on 26 critics, indicating "mixed or average" reviews.

=== Awards ===
- 1998 Cannes Film Festival – Palme d'Or Nomination (John Turturro)
