= 13 Moons =

- DVD release cover
- Directed by: Alexandre Rockwell
- Written by: Brandon Cole; Alexandre Rockwell
- Produced by: Brandon Cole; Michael Din; David Kronemeyer; Alexandre Rockwell
- Starring: Jennifer Beals; Elizabeth Bracco; Steve Buscemi; Peter Dinklage; Sam Rockwell; Peter Stormare
- Cinematography: Phil Parmet
- Edited by: John David Allen
- Music by: Brian Kelly; Kevin Salem
- Distributed by: 13 Moons Productions LLC; Lot 47 Films
- Release date: January 2002
- Running time: 93 minutes
- Country: United States
- Language: English

13 Moons is a 2002 comedy-drama film directed by Alexandre Rockwell. The title is a reference to the saying of a minor character's mother, who suggested that if nights of the full moon are strange, then "this must be the night of thirteen moons."

== Plot ==
Bananas the Clown is run over by his wife, Suzi, who has discovered his stripper girlfriend, Louise. When his wife is jailed for trying to run him over, they contact a bail bondsman. The bondsman is busy taking care of his sick son, Timmy. On the way, they are accosted by a crazed drug addict named Slovo, who is hit by a car soon after.

At the jail, the five meet up with an angry record producer and the girlfriend he believes to be pregnant, whom he plans to make a star, despite her protestations of not having any talent. Also along for the ride are two priests, one of whom has begun to doubt the wisdom of the Roman Catholic Church, who are trying to bail out a third priest who was goaded into a fight by the proprietor of a strip club.

When the nine characters intersect, they discover that Timmy has a defective kidney and is slowly dying. He has just been paged, as there is a donor at the hospital: Slovo. The three caring characters immediately take Timmy to the hospital, with the others in pursuit. By the time they arrive, Slovo is partially recovered and escapes to wander the streets, cheerfully ignoring his internal bleeding, and must be tracked down before both he and Timmy die.

== Cast ==
- Jennifer Beals as Suzi
- Elizabeth Bracco as Louise Potter
- Steve Buscemi as Bananas The Clown
- Peter Dinklage as "Binky"
- Daryl Mitchell as Lenny
- Karyn Parsons as Lily
- David Proval as Mo Potter
- Rose Rollins as Sanandra
- Peter Stormare as Slovo
- Pruitt Taylor Vince as Owen
- Gareth Williams as Thad
- Austin Wolff as Timmy
- Francesco Messina as Robert
- Sam Rockwell as Rick
- Matthew Sussman as Dr. Monroe
- Lester Speight as Vincent

== Reception ==
In a 2023 review of the film, The White River Valley Herald stated that "13 Moons isn't a good film, but it has a key insight that's exceedingly rare in the filmmaking world. See, most bad movies end up that way because they tried to be good and failed. If being good was never the intention, though, strange new opportunities present themselves."
