= Romance & Cigarettes =

- Theatrical release poster
- Directed by: John Turturro
- Written by: John Turturro
- Produced by: John Penotti; John Turturro
- Starring: James Gandolfini; Susan Sarandon; Kate Winslet; Steve Buscemi; Bobby Canavale; Mandy Moore; Mary-Louise Parker; Aida Turturro; Christopher Walken
- Cinematography: Tom Stern
- Edited by: Ray Hubley
- Production companies: United Artists; Icon Productions; GreeneStreet Films
- Distributed by: MGM Distribution Co.
- Release dates: September 6, 2005 (Venice); September 7, 2007 (US)
- Running time: 105 minutes
- Country: United States
- Language: English
- Box office: $2.9 million

Romance & Cigarettes is a 2005 American jukebox musical romantic comedy film written and directed by John Turturro. The film stars an ensemble cast which includes James Gandolfini, Susan Sarandon, Kate Winslet, Steve Buscemi, Bobby Cannavale, Mandy Moore, Mary-Louise Parker, Aida Turturro, Christopher Walken, Barbara Sukowa, Elaine Stritch, Eddie Izzard, and Amy Sedaris. The film was nominated for a Golden Lion at the 2005 Venice Film Festival.

== Plot ==
In early 1980s New York, seamstress Kitty Kane learns that her construction worker husband, Nick Murder, has been having an affair after finding a sexually explicit poem he wrote to his mistress. The revelation generates a rift between Kitty and Nick and sends shockwaves both through their family and closely knit suburban neighborhood; as characters contemplate what love, sex, and physical pleasure mean to them, their thoughts are conveyed via elaborate musical numbers representing their deepest fears, anxieties, and fantasies.

Against the backdrop of her parents' deteriorating relationship, their daughter Baby— who plays lead guitar and provides vocals for a local rock band— finds herself embarking on her own romance with Chetty Jr., an attractive but dimwitted neighborhood boy who insists on referring to himself in the third person as "Fryburg." When Baby announces her plans to marry to Kitty, she forbids it, fearful that Baby's life will turn out like her own. Meanwhile, Nick continues to see his mistress, Tula, a much younger Mancunian woman who works in a lingerie shop and who first came onto him after seeing him working shirtless at a job site; hoping for a lifelong commitment from Nick, Tula encourages him to get a circumcision, which he eventually does after convincing from his best friend and coworker Angelo, a sexual compulsive who waxes philosophical on the nature of romance and intercourse.

Struggling to recover from Nick's affair, Kitty resumes going to church, where she reconnects with her old parish priest and joins the choir. Wanting to confront Tula but unsure of her identity, she enlists the help of her cousin Bo, a rockabilly fixated, paranoid man who insists that he got away with the murder of his adulterous wife, Delilah, who is in fact still alive and living with her boyfriend. The pair eventually track Tula to the lingerie shop where she works, where she and Kitty get into a violent physical altercation. Shortly thereafter, Nick suffers licorice poisoning following an eating binge. He's rushed to the hospital, where his mother and Angelo confront him about his behavior. Nick's mother tells him that he's following in the footsteps of his similarly unfaithful and repulsive father and grandfather, both of whom engaged in sexually questionable behavior and who are now remembered as nothing more than "whoremongers." Genuinely ashamed and fearing he'll be remembered the same way, Nick breaks off his affair with Tula. He attempts to reconcile with Kitty, who consents to him remaining in the house but who refuses to forgive him for the affair.

Baby breaks up with Fryburg after she realizes he has no ambition in life and would make a poor life partner. Later, Nick gets into a physical altercation with a neighbor who piles snow on their lawn; the younger, fitter neighbor gets the upper hand and brutally beats Nick, almost killing him before Kitty intervenes on his behalf, beginning a tenuous reconciliation. Not long after, Nick is diagnosed with terminal lung cancer, the result of years of heavy smoking. Distraught, he goes to Kitty's priest and confesses to the affair and his generally bad behavior. Kitty agrees to care for him while he dies, though she tells him she can never bring herself to have sex with him again. As his condition deteriorates, Nick is hospitalized; one night, Kitty comes to visit him, and Nick composes her a poem expressing his love for her and gratitude for their life together. Not long after, Nick dies, leaving a conflicted Kitty to reconcile her feelings for him while contemplating her own future.

== Cast ==
- James Gandolfini as Nick Murder
- Susan Sarandon as Kitty Kane Murder
- Kate Winslet as Tula
- Steve Buscemi as Angelo
- Bobby Cannavale as Chetty Jr. / "Fryburg"
- Mandy Moore as Baby Murder
- Mary-Louise Parker as Constance Murder
- Aida Turturro as Rosebud / "Rara"
- Christopher Walken as Cousin Bo
- Barbara Sukowa as Gracie
- Elaine Stritch as Grace Murder
- Eddie Izzard as Father Gene Vincent
- Amy Sedaris as Frances
- P. J. Brown as Police Officer
- Adam LeFevre as Frances's Boyfriend
- Tonya Pinkins as Medic
- Cady Huffman as Roe
- Kumar Pallana as Da Da Kumar
- Tony Goldwyn as Kitty's first love (uncredited)

== Production and release ==
The film was produced by New York production company GreeneStreet Films, with financial backing from United Artists, the Coen brothers and Mel Gibson's company Icon Entertainment International.

== Release ==
Romance & Cigarettes premiered at the Venice Film Festival on September 6, 2005, followed by a showing at the Toronto International Film Festival a week later.

It was first released in the United Kingdom and Ireland on March 24, 2006, quickly followed by a number of other European countries in March and April 2006. In the United States the film got a limited release on September 7, 2007, distributed by director Turturro himself, although it was originally intended that United Artists should handle the US distribution.

UA still owns a financial stake in this film, but the main underlying rights are currently with Icon.

== Reception ==
Romance & Cigarettes has received mixed reviews. On the review aggregator website Rotten Tomatoes, 53% of 59 critics' reviews are positive, with an average rating of 5.6/10. The website's consensus reads: "This movie musical aims for fun and modern, but Romance and Cigarettes is too scattered and uneven to achieve either." Metacritic, which uses a weighted average, assigned the film a score of 55 out of 100, based on 22 critics, indicating "mixed or average" reviews.

On April 27, 2008, the film was screened at the 10th Annual Ebertfest, in Champaign, Illinois. Ebertfest is Roger Ebert's film festival near his hometown of Urbana, Illinois. Aida Turturro and Tricia Brouk were scheduled to attend the event. Ebert gave the film four stars out of four.

== Soundtrack ==
1. "Delilah" – Tom Jones
2. "A Man Without Love" – Engelbert Humperdinck
3. "Piece of My Heart" – Dusty Springfield
4. "Answer Me, My Love" – Gene Ammons
5. "Red-Headed Woman" – Bruce Springsteen
6. "Scapricciatiello (Do You Love Me Like You Kiss Me?)" – Connie Francis
7. "Hot Pants" – Bobby Cannavale
8. "Quando m'innamoro" – Anna Identici
9. "Little Water Song" – Ute Lemper
10. "Prisoner of Love" – Cyndi Lauper
11. "Trouble" – Elvis Presley
12. "Samson and Delilah Theme" – Victor Young
1. "El cuarto de Tula" – Buena Vista Social Club
2. "Piece of My Heart" – Erma Franklin
3. "I Want Candy" – Mandy Moore with Aida Turturro and Mary-Louise Parker
4. "It's a Man's Man's Man's World" – James Brown
5. "It Must Be Him" – Vikki Carr
6. "The Girl That I Marry" – James Gandolfini and Susan Sarandon
7. "Ten Commandments of Love" – Harvey & The Moonglows
8. "I Wonder Who's Kissing Her Now" – Aida Turturro
9. "Banks of the Ohio" – David Patrick Kelly and Katherine Borowitz
10. "Piece of My Heart" – Janis Joplin
11. "When the Saviour Reached Down for Me" – The R&C Choir
