= Coen brothers filmography =

Joel Coen and Ethan Coen, collectively referred to as the Coen brothers, are American filmmakers. Their films span many genres and styles, which they frequently subvert or parody. The brothers have jointly written, directed and produced 18 films, and have edited 15 of them under the collective pseudonym Roderick Jaynes.

The Coen brothers have been nominated for thirteen Academy Awards together, and individually for one award each, winning Best Original Screenplay for Fargo and Best Picture, Best Director and Best Adapted Screenplay for No Country for Old Men. The duo also won the Palme d'Or for Barton Fink and were nominated for Fargo.

== Films ==
Year	Title	Directors (Note: Ethan uncredited as director until The Ladykillers)	Writers	Producers (Note: Joel uncredited as producer until The Ladykillers)	Editors (Note: Both credited as Roderick Jaynes)	Notes
1984	Blood Simple	Yes	Yes	Yes	Yes	
1987	Raising Arizona	Yes	Yes	Yes	No	
1990	Miller's Crossing	Yes	Yes	Yes	No	
1991	Barton Fink	Yes	Yes	Yes	Yes	
1994	The Hudsucker Proxy	Yes	Yes	Yes	No	Written with Sam Raimi
1996	Fargo	Yes	Yes	Yes	Yes	
1998	The Big Lebowski	Yes	Yes	Yes	Yes	
2000	O Brother, Where Art Thou?	Yes	Yes	Yes	Yes	Based on Homer's Odyssey
2001	The Man Who Wasn't There	Yes	Yes	Yes	Yes	
2003	Intolerable Cruelty	Yes	Yes	Yes	Yes	
2004	The Ladykillers	Yes	Yes	Yes	Yes	Based on the 1955 film The Ladykillers
2006	Paris, je t'aime	Yes	Yes	No	No	Segment "Tuileries"
2007	Chacun son cinéma	Yes	Yes	No	Yes	Segment "World Cinema"
2007	No Country for Old Men	Yes	Yes	Yes	Yes	Based on the novel No Country for Old Men by Cormac McCarthy
2008	Burn After Reading	Yes	Yes	Yes	Yes	
2009	A Serious Man	Yes	Yes	Yes	Yes	
2010	True Grit	Yes	Yes	Yes	Yes	Based on the novel True Grit by Charles Portis
2013	Inside Llewyn Davis	Yes	Yes	Yes	Yes	
2016	Hail, Caesar!	Yes	Yes	Yes	Yes	
2018	The Ballad of Buster Scruggs	Yes	Yes	Yes	Yes	
2027	Jack of Spades	Joel	Yes	Joel	TBA	Written with Eleanor Catton and Conor McPherson

As screenwriters

In addition to their own films, the Coen brothers have also contributed to others' films.

Year	Title	Director	Notes
1985	Crimewave	Sam Raimi	
2003	Bad Santa	Terry Zwigoff	Uncredited rewrites
2009	A Simple Noodle Story	Zhang Yimou	A comedic Mandarin-language remake of Blood Simple; they received a story credit
2012	Gambit	Michael Hoffman	Remake of the 1966 film of the same name
2014	Unbroken	Angelina Jolie	
2015	Bridge of Spies	Steven Spielberg	
2017	Suburbicon	George Clooney	

As executive producers

Year	Title	Director	Notes
2000	Down from the Mountain	Nick Doob; Chris Hegedus; D. A. Pennebaker	Documentary about the musical artists that performed the songs in the film O Brother, Where Art Thou?
2003	Bad Santa	Terry Zwigoff	
2005	Romance & Cigarettes	John Turturro	
2013	Another Day, Another Time: Celebrating the Music of Inside Llewyn Davis	Christopher Wilcha	Documentary and concert in link with the film Inside Llewyn Davis
2014–24	Fargo	Various	TV series based on the original film

== Solo work ==
=== Joel ===
Year	Title	Director	Writer	Producer	Editor	Notes
2021	The Tragedy of Macbeth	Yes	Yes	Yes	Yes (Note: Credited as Reginald Jaynes)	Based on Macbeth by William Shakespeare

As executive producer

Year	Title	Director	Notes
2025	The Bend in the River	Robb Moss	Documentary

=== Ethan ===
Film

Year	Title	Director	Writer	Producer	Notes
1998	The Naked Man	No	Yes	No	Co-written with J. Todd Anderson
2022	Jerry Lee Lewis: Trouble in Mind	Yes	No	No	Documentary
2024	Drive-Away Dolls	Yes	Yes	Yes	Co-written with Tricia Cooke
2025	Honey Don't!	Yes	Yes	Yes	Co-written with Tricia Cooke

Theater

Year	Title	Notes
2008	Almost an Evening	One-act play anthology
2009	Offices	One-act play anthology
2011	Happy Hour	One-act play anthology
2011	Talking Cure	One-act play from Relatively Speaking
2013	Women or Nothing	
2019	A Play Is a Poem	One-act play anthology
2025	Let's Love!	One-act play anthology

Literature

Year	Title	Type
1998	Gates of Eden	Short story collection
2001	The Drunken Driver Has the Right of Way	Poems and limericks collection
2012	The Day the World Ends	Poetry collection

== See also ==
- Coen brothers' unrealized projects
- The Jesus Rolls (2019) – A remake of Going Places written and directed by John Turturro as a spinoff of the Coen Brothers The Big Lebowski.
