= Coen brothers =

American filmmakers

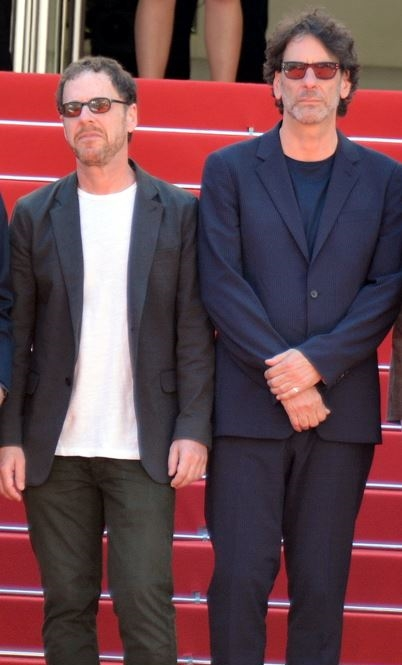
- Ethan (left) and Joel Coen in 2015
- Born: Joel Daniel Coen; November 29, 1954 (age 71) Ethan Jesse Coen; September 21, 1957 (age 69); St. Louis Park, Minnesota, U.S. (both)
- Other names: Coen brothers; Roderick Jaynes; Reginald Jaynes; Mike Zoss
- Education: Joel: Bard College at Simon's Rock (AA); New York University (BFA) Ethan: Bard College at Simon's Rock (AA); Princeton University (BA)
- Occupations: Film directors; producers; screenwriters; editors
- Years active: 1984–2018 (as a duo)
- Spouse(s): Joel: Frances McDormand (m. 1984) Ethan: Tricia Cooke (m. 1990)
- Children: Joel: 1 Ethan: 2
- Awards: Full list

The Coen brothers (/ˈkoʊən/), Joel (born 1954) and Ethan (born 1957), are American filmmakers. Their films span many genres and styles, which they frequently subvert or parody. Among their most acclaimed works are Blood Simple (1984), Raising Arizona (1987), Miller's Crossing (1990), Barton Fink (1991), Fargo (1996), The Big Lebowski (1998), O Brother, Where Art Thou? (2000), No Country for Old Men (2007), A Serious Man (2009), True Grit (2010), and Inside Llewyn Davis (2013).

The brothers generally write, direct and produce their films jointly, although due to DGA regulations, Joel received sole directing credit while Ethan received sole production credit until The Ladykillers (2004), from which point on they would be credited together as directors and producers; they also shared editing credits under the alias Roderick Jaynes. The duo started directing separately in the 2020s, beginning with Joel's The Tragedy of Macbeth (2021) and Ethan's Jerry Lee Lewis: Trouble in Mind (2022) and Drive-Away Dolls (2024). They have been nominated for 13 Academy Awards together, plus one individual nomination for each, sharing wins for Best Original Screenplay for Fargo, and Best Picture, Best Director and Best Adapted Screenplay for No Country for Old Men. Barton Fink won the Palme d'Or at the 1991 Cannes Film Festival.

The Coens have written films for other directors, including Sam Raimi's Crimewave (1985), Angelina Jolie's World War II biopic Unbroken (2014) and Steven Spielberg's Cold War drama Bridge of Spies (2015). They produced Terry Zwigoff's Bad Santa (2003) and John Turturro's Romance and Cigarettes (2005). Ethan is also a writer of short stories, theater and poetry.

Three of their films have been inducted into the National Film Registry. (Note: Fargo (1996), The Big Lebowski (1998), and No Country for Old Men (2007)) No Country for Old Men, A Serious Man and Inside Llewyn Davis were included on the BBC's 2016 poll of the greatest films since 2000. In 1998, the American Film Institute ranked Fargo among the 100 greatest American movies. They are known for their distinctive stylistic trademarks including genre hybridity. Richard Corliss wrote of the Coens: "Dexterously flipping and reheating old movie genres like so many pancakes, they serve them up fresh, not with syrup but with a coating of comic arsenic."

== Lives and careers ==
=== Early years and education ===
Joel Daniel Coen (born November 29, 1954) and Ethan Jesse Coen (born September 21, 1957) were born and raised in St. Louis Park, Minnesota, a suburb of Minneapolis. Their mother, Rena (née Neumann; 1925–2001), was an art historian at St. Cloud State University, and their father, Edward Coen (1919–2012), was a professor of economics at the University of Minnesota. The brothers have an older sister, Deborah, who is a psychiatrist in Israel.

Both sides of the Coen family were Ashkenazi Jews tracing their ancestry to Eastern Europe. Their paternal grandfather, Victor Coen, was a barrister in the Inns of Court in London before retiring to Hove with their grandmother. Edward Coen was an American citizen born in the United States, but grew up in Croydon, London, and studied at the London School of Economics. Afterwards he moved to the United States, where he met the Coens' mother, and served in the United States Army during World War II.

The Coens developed an early interest in cinema through television. They grew up watching Italian films (ranging from the works of Federico Fellini to the Sons of Hercules films) aired on a Minneapolis station, the Tarzan films, and comedies (Jerry Lewis, Bob Hope and Doris Day).

In the mid-1960s, Joel saved money from mowing lawns to buy a Vivitar Super 8 camera. Together, the brothers remade movies they saw on television, with their neighborhood friend Mark Zimering ("Zeimers") as the star. Cornel Wilde's The Naked Prey (1965) became their Zeimers in Zambezi, which featured Ethan as a native with a spear. Lassie Come Home (1943) was reinterpreted as their Ed... A Dog, with Ethan playing the mother role in his sister's tutu. They also made original films like Henry Kissinger, Man on the Go, Lumberjacks of the North and The Banana Film.

Joel and Ethan graduated from St. Louis Park High School in 1973 and 1976, respectively, and from Bard College at Simon's Rock in Great Barrington, Massachusetts.

After Simon's Rock, Joel spent four years in the undergraduate film program at New York University, where he made a 30-minute thesis film, Soundings. In 1979, he briefly enrolled in the graduate film program at the University of Texas at Austin, following a woman he had married who was in the graduate linguistics program. The marriage soon ended in divorce and Joel left UT Austin after nine months.

Ethan went on to Princeton University and earned an undergraduate degree in philosophy in 1979. His senior thesis was a 41-page essay, "Two Views of Wittgenstein's Later Philosophy", which was supervised by Raymond Geuss.

=== 1980s ===
After graduating from New York University, Joel worked as a production assistant on a variety of industrial films and music videos. He developed a talent for film editing and met Sam Raimi while assisting Edna Ruth Paul in editing Raimi's first feature film, The Evil Dead (1981).

The duo made their debut with Blood Simple (1984). Set in Texas, it tells the tale of a bar owner (Dan Hedaya) who hires a detective (M. Emmet Walsh) to kill his wife and her lover (Frances McDormand and John Getz, respectively). It contains elements that point to their future direction: distinctive homages to genre movies (in this case noir and horror), plot twists layered over a simple story, snappy dialogue and dark humor. Janet Maslin wrote: "The camera work by Barry Sonnenfeld is especially dazzling. So is the fact that Mr. Coen, unlike many people who have directed great-looking film noir efforts, knows better than to let handsomeness become the film's entire raison d'être. In addition to its stylishness, Blood Simple has the kind of purposefulness and coherence that show Mr. Coen to be headed for bigger, even better, things." Joel's direction was recognized at the Sundance and Independent Spirit awards. It was the first film shot by Sonnenfeld, who collaborated with the Coens on their two subsequent films and went on to be a director. It marked the first of many collaborations between the Coens and composer Carter Burwell. It was also the screen debut of McDormand, who went on to feature in many of the Coens' films (and to marry Joel).

Their next project was Crimewave (Raimi, 1985), written by the Coens and Raimi. Joel and Raimi also made cameos in Spies Like Us (1985).

The brothers wanted to follow their debut with something fast-paced and funny. Raising Arizona (1987) follows an unlikely married couple: ex-convict H.I. (Nicolas Cage) and police officer Ed (Holly Hunter), who long for a baby but are unable to conceive. When furniture tycoon Nathan Arizona (Trey Wilson) appears on television with his newly born quintuplets and jokes that they "are more than we can handle", H.I. steals one of the quintuplets to bring up as their own. The film featured McDormand, William Forsythe, Sam McMurray, Randall "Tex" Cobb and marked the first of many collaborations between the Coens and John Goodman. Pauline Kael wrote that the Coens "are going with their strengths. They're making a contraption, and they're good at it because they know how to make the camera behave mechanically, which is just right here—it mirrors the mechanics of farce ... The Sunsets look marvellously ultra-vivid; the paint doesn't seem to be dry—it's like opening day at a miniature-golf course."

=== 1990s ===
Miller's Crossing (1990) is a gangster film inspired by Dashiell Hammett's Red Harvest (1929) and The Glass Key (1931). It stars Gabriel Byrne as Irish mobster Tom Reagan and features Albert Finney, Marcia Gay Harden, Steve Buscemi, Jon Polito and John Turturro. The film was released almost simultaneously with Goodfellas and was not a commercial success, but received positive reviews. Christopher Orr calls it "a distillation of all the tropes and themes and moods of the classic gangster film." It was the Coens' first collaboration with production designer Dennis Gassner.

While puzzling over the plot of Miller's Crossing, the brothers wrote Barton Fink (1991) in a matter of weeks. Set in 1941, it follows Fink (Turturro), a New York playwright who moves to Los Angeles to write a B-picture for a venal movie mogul (Michael Lerner). He checks into a strange hotel occupied by Charlie (Goodman) and tended by Chet (Buscemi). Fink is modeled on playwright Clifford Odets, and the character W.P. Mayhew (John Mahoney) is based on William Faulkner. Barton Fink was a critical success, earning Oscar nominations and winning Best Director, Best Actor and Palme d'Or at the 1991 Cannes Film Festival. It was their first film with cinematographer Roger Deakins, a key collaborator for the next 25 years.

The Hudsucker Proxy (1994) is an homage to the screwball comedies of Frank Capra and Howard Hawks. Co-written with Raimi, the film follows a mailroom clerk (Tim Robbins) who is promoted to president of the Hudsucker Corporation by a cynical director (Paul Newman) in a scheme to devalue the company's stock; a fast-talking newspaperwoman (Jennifer Jason Leigh) tries to scoop the story. Critics praised the production design but criticized the tone. It was a box office bomb ($30 million budget, $3 million gross in the US).

The brothers bounced back with the "homespun murder story" Fargo (1996), set in their home state of Minnesota. In it, car salesman Jerry Lundegaard (William H. Macy), who has serious financial problems, has his wife kidnapped so that his wealthy father-in-law (Harve Presnell) will pay the ransom, which he plans to split with the kidnappers (Buscemi and Peter Stormare). Complications ensue, and local cop Marge Gunderson (McDormand) starts to investigate. Produced on a small budget of $7 million, Fargo was a critical and commercial success, winning Oscars for Best Original Screenplay for the Coens and Best Actress for McDormand and the New York Film Critics Circle Award for Best Picture. Maslin wrote that "Perversely, the frozen north even brings out some uncharacteristic warmth in these coolly cerebral film makers, although anyone seeking the milk of human kindness would be well advised to look elsewhere. ... Fargo has been hauntingly photographed by Roger Deakins with great, expressive use of white-outs that sometimes make the characters appear to be moving through a dream. Roads disappear, swallowed up in a snowy void, making Fargo look eerily remote. As the title suggests, there is a steady sense of distance and uncharted territory." Roger Ebert wrote that "To watch it is to experience steadily mounting delight, as you realize the filmmakers have taken enormous risks, gotten away with them, and have made a movie that is completely original, and as familiar as an old shoe – or a rubber-soled hunting boot from Land's End, more likely."

Ethan co-wrote the comedy The Naked Man (1998), which was directed by the Coens' storyboard artist J. Todd Anderson. The same year, Ethan published Gates of Eden, a collection of short stories.

The Big Lebowski (1998) is a crime comedy about Jeff "The Dude" Lebowski (Jeff Bridges), a Los Angeles slacker who is involved in a kidnapping case after being mistaken for a millionaire of the same name (David Huddleston.) It features Philip Seymour Hoffman as Lebowski's flunky, Goodman and Buscemi as The Dude's bowling buddies and Julianne Moore as his "special lady friend". It was influenced by Raymond Chandler's The Big Sleep (1939) and Robert Altman's The Long Goodbye. It has become a cult classic. An annual festival, Lebowski Fest, began in 2002, and many adhere to the philosophy of "Dudeism". Andrew Sarris wrote that the Coens had made a "cubist collage of an old genre with a new frankness. The result is a lot of laughs and a feeling of awe toward the craftsmanship involved. I doubt that there’ll be anything else like it the rest of this year." It was the first collaboration between the Coens and T Bone Burnett, credited as "Music Archivist".

=== 2000s ===
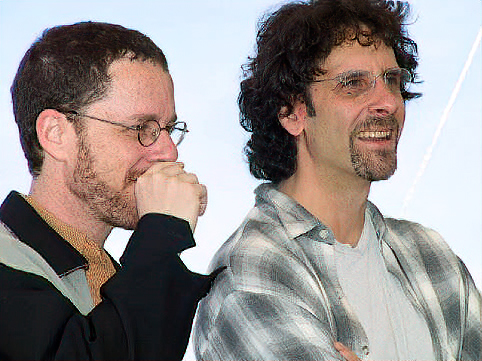
Ethan and Joel at the 2001 Cannes Film Festival

O Brother, Where Art Thou? (2000) is a loose retelling of Homer's Odyssey, complete with sirens and a Cyclops. The story is set in Mississippi in the 1930s and follows a trio of escaped convicts who, after absconding from a chain gang, journey home to recover bank-heist loot the leader has buried—but they have no clear perception of where they are going. The title was borrowed from Preston Sturges's film Sullivan's Travels (1941), whose lead character had planned to make a film with that title. The film highlighted the comic abilities of George Clooney as the oddball lead character Ulysses Everett McGill, and of Turturro and Tim Blake Nelson, his sidekicks. The film's bluegrass and old-time soundtrack, offbeat humor and digitally desaturated cinematography made it a critical and commercial hit. It was the first feature film to use all-digital color grading. The soundtrack was also successful, spawning a concert and concert/documentary DVD, Down from the Mountain and winning the Grammy for Album of the Year.

The Coens next produced another noirish thriller, The Man Who Wasn't There (2001).

The Coens directed the 2003 film Intolerable Cruelty, starring George Clooney and Catherine Zeta-Jones, a throwback to the romantic comedies of the 1940s. It focuses on hotshot divorce lawyer Miles Massey and a beautiful divorcée whom Massey managed to prevent from receiving any money in her divorce. She vows to get even with him while, at the same time, he becomes smitten with her. Intolerable Cruelty received generally positive reviews, although it is considered one of the duo's weaker films. Also that year, they executive produced and did an uncredited rewrite of the Christmas black comedy Bad Santa, which garnered positive reviews.

In 2004, the Coens made The Ladykillers, a remake of the British classic by Ealing Studios. A professor, played by Tom Hanks, assembles a team to rob a casino. They rent a room in an elderly woman's home to plan the heist. When the woman discovers the plot, the gang decides to murder her to ensure her silence. The Coens received some of the most lukewarm reviews of their careers in response to this film.

They directed two short films for two separate anthology films—Paris, je t'aime (Tuileries, 2006) starring Steve Buscemi, and To Each His Own Cinema (World Cinema, 2007) starring Josh Brolin. Both films received highly positive reviews.

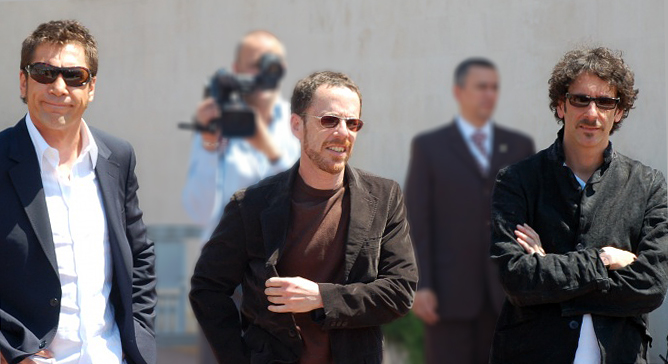
The Coens with Javier Bardem at the 2007 Cannes Film Festival

No Country for Old Men, released in November 2007, closely follows the 2005 novel of the same name by Cormac McCarthy. Vietnam veteran Llewelyn Moss (Josh Brolin), living near the Texas/Mexico border, stumbles upon, and decides to take, two million dollars in drug money. He must then go on the run to avoid those trying to recover the money, including sociopathic killer Anton Chigurh (Javier Bardem), who confounds both Llewelyn and local sheriff Ed Tom Bell (Tommy Lee Jones). The plotline is a return to noir themes, but in some respects it was a departure for the Coens; with the exception of Stephen Root, none of the stable of regular actors appears in the film. No Country received nearly universal critical praise, garnering a 94% "Fresh" rating at Rotten Tomatoes. It won four Academy Awards, including Best Picture, Best Director and Best Adapted Screenplay, all of which were received by the Coens, as well as Best Supporting Actor received by Bardem. The Coens, as "Roderick Jaynes", were also nominated for Best Editing, but lost. It was the first time since 1961 (when Jerome Robbins and Robert Wise won for West Side Story) that two directors received the Academy Award for Best Director at the same time.

In January 2008, Ethan Coen's play Almost an Evening premiered off-Broadway at the Atlantic Theater Company Stage 2, opening to mostly enthusiastic reviews. The initial run closed on February 10, 2008, but the same production was moved to a new theatre for a commercial off-Broadway run at the Bleecker Street Theater in New York City. Produced by The Atlantic Theater Company, it ran there from March 2008 through June 1, 2008. and Art Meets Commerce. In May 2009, the Atlantic Theater Company produced Coen's Offices, as part of their mainstage season at the Linda Gross Theater.

Burn After Reading, a comedy starring Brad Pitt and George Clooney, was released September 12, 2008, and portrays a collision course between two gym instructors, spies and Internet dating. Released to positive reviews, it debuted at No. 1 in North America.

In 2009, the Coens directed a television commercial titled "Air Freshener" for the Reality Coalition.

They next directed A Serious Man, released October 2, 2009, a "gentle but dark" period comedy (set in 1967) with a low budget. The film is based loosely on the Coens' childhoods in an academic family in the largely Jewish suburb of Saint Louis Park, Minnesota; it also drew comparisons to the Book of Job. Filming took place late in the summer of 2008, in the neighborhoods of Roseville and Bloomington, Minnesota, at Normandale Community College, and at St. Olaf College. The film was nominated for the Oscars for Best Picture and Best Original Screenplay.

=== 2010s ===
True Grit (2010) is based on the 1968 novel of the same name by Charles Portis. Filming was done in Texas and New Mexico. Hailee Steinfeld stars as Mattie Ross along with Jeff Bridges as Marshal Rooster Cogburn. Matt Damon and Josh Brolin also appear in the movie. True Grit was nominated for ten Academy Awards including Best Picture.

Ethan Coen wrote the one-act comedy Talking Cure, which was produced on Broadway in 2011 as part of Relatively Speaking, an anthology of three one-act plays by Coen, Elaine May, and Woody Allen.

In 2011, the Coen brothers won the $1 million Dan David Prize for their contribution to cinema and society.

Inside Llewyn Davis (2013) is a treatise on the 1960s folk music scene in New York City's Greenwich Village, and very loosely based on the life of Dave Van Ronk. The film stars Oscar Isaac, Justin Timberlake, and Carey Mulligan. It won the Grand Prix at the 2013 Cannes Film Festival, where it was highly praised by critics. They received a Golden Globe nomination for Best Original Song for "Please Mr. Kennedy", which is heard in the film.

Fargo, a television series inspired by their film of the same name, premiered in April 2014 on the FX network. It is created by Noah Hawley and executive produced by the brothers.

The Coens also contributed to the screenplay for Unbroken, along with Richard LaGravenese and William Nicholson. The film is directed by Angelina Jolie and based on Laura Hillenbrand's non-fiction book, Unbroken: A World War II Story of Survival, Resilience, and Redemption (2010) which itself was based on the life of Louis Zamperini. It was released on December 25, 2014, to average reviews.

The Coens co-wrote, with playwright Matt Charman, the screenplay for the dramatic historical thriller Bridge of Spies, about the 1960 U-2 Incident. The film was directed by Steven Spielberg, and released on October 4, 2015, to critical acclaim. They were nominated for the Best Original Screenplay at the 88th Academy Awards.

The Coens directed the film Hail, Caesar!, about a "fixer" in 1950s Hollywood trying to discover what happened to a cast member who vanishes during filming. It stars Coen regulars George Clooney, Josh Brolin, Frances McDormand, Scarlett Johansson and Tilda Swinton, as well as Channing Tatum, Ralph Fiennes, Jonah Hill, and Alden Ehrenreich. The film was released on February 5, 2016.

In 2016, the Coens gave to their longtime friend and collaborator John Turturro the right to use his character of Jesus Quintana from The Big Lebowski in his own spin-off, The Jesus Rolls, which he would also write and direct. The Coens had no involvement in the production. In August 2016, the film began principal photography.

The Coens first wrote the script for Suburbicon in 1986. The film was eventually directed by George Clooney and began filming in October 2016. It was released by Paramount Pictures in the fall of 2017.

The Coens directed The Ballad of Buster Scruggs, a Western anthology starring Tim Blake Nelson, Liam Neeson, and James Franco. It began streaming on Netflix on November 16, 2018, after a brief theatrical run.

=== 2020s ===
It was announced in March 2019 that Joel Coen would be directing an adaptation of Macbeth starring Denzel Washington and Frances McDormand. The film, titled The Tragedy of Macbeth, was Joel's first directorial effort without his brother, who was taking a break from films to focus on theater. The film premiered at the 2021 New York Film Festival. The 2022 Cannes Film Festival had a special screening of Jerry Lee Lewis: Trouble in Mind, an archival documentary film directed solely by Ethan Coen and edited by his wife Tricia Cooke. In 2022, it was announced that Ethan Coen would be directing Drive-Away Dolls for Focus Features and Working Title from a script he co-wrote with Cooke. It was Ethan's first narrative film without his brother. The film was released in February 2024. He and Cooke subsequently collaborated on the 2025 film Honey Don't! Joel Coen will next direct the upcoming mystery film Jack of Spades.

In 2025, in an interview with Collider, Ethan Coen acknowledged the hiatus since the brothers' last collaboration, saying that it was due to them being "out of sync" with each other due in large part to the COVID-19 pandemic, while stressing that they never formally decided to stop making movies together.

=== Production company ===
The Coen brothers' own film production company, Mike Zoss Productions located in New York City, has been credited on their films from O Brother, Where Art Thou? onwards. It was named after Mike Zoss Drug, an independent pharmacy in St. Louis Park since 1950 that was the brothers' beloved hangout when they were growing up in the Twin Cities. The name was also used for the pharmacy in No Country for Old Men. The Mike Zoss logo consists of a crayon drawing of a horse, standing in a field of grass with its head turned around as it looks back over its hindquarters.

=== Personal lives ===
Joel has been married to actress Frances McDormand since 1984. In 1995, they adopted a son from Paraguay when he was six months old. McDormand has acted in a number of Coen brothers films: Blood Simple, Raising Arizona, Miller's Crossing, Barton Fink, Fargo, The Man Who Wasn't There, Burn After Reading, Hail, Caesar!, and The Tragedy of Macbeth. For her performance in Fargo, she won the Academy Award for Best Actress.

Ethan married film editor Tricia Cooke in 1993. They have a daughter and a son. They describe their relationship as "nontraditional"—Cooke is a lesbian while Ethan is straight, and they each have another partner. (Note: Attributed to multiple references:) The two co-wrote the film Drive-Away Dolls, which Ethan directed and Tricia edited.

Ethan and his family live in New York, while Joel and McDormand live in Marin County, California.

== Directing distinctions ==
Up to 2003, Joel received sole credit for directing and Ethan for producing, due to guild rules that disallowed multiple director credits to prevent dilution of the position's significance. The only exception to this rule is if the co-directors are an "established duo". Since 2004, they have been able to share the director credit and the Coen brothers have become only the third duo to be nominated for the Academy Award for Best Director.

With four Academy Award nominations for No Country for Old Men for the duo (Best Picture, Best Director, Best Adapted Screenplay, and Best Film Editing as Roderick Jaynes), the Coen brothers matched the record for the most nominations by a single nominee (counting an "established duo" as one nominee) for the same film.

== Filmography ==
Directed features
Year	Title	Distribution
1984	Blood Simple	Circle Films
1987	Raising Arizona	20th Century Fox
1990	Miller's Crossing	20th Century Fox
1991	Barton Fink	20th Century Fox
1994	The Hudsucker Proxy	Warner Bros. Pictures / PolyGram Filmed Entertainment
1996	Fargo	Gramercy Pictures / PolyGram Filmed Entertainment
1998	The Big Lebowski	Gramercy Pictures / PolyGram Filmed Entertainment
2000	O Brother, Where Art Thou?	Buena Vista Pictures Distribution / Universal Pictures
2001	The Man Who Wasn't There	USA Films
2003	Intolerable Cruelty	Universal Pictures
2004	The Ladykillers	Buena Vista Pictures Distribution
2007	No Country for Old Men	Miramax / Paramount Vantage
2008	Burn After Reading	Focus Features
2009	A Serious Man	Focus Features
2010	True Grit	Paramount Pictures
2013	Inside Llewyn Davis	CBS Films
2016	Hail, Caesar!	Universal Pictures
2018	The Ballad of Buster Scruggs	Netflix

Joel only
Year	Title	Distribution
2021	The Tragedy of Macbeth	A24 / Apple TV+
2027	Jack of Spades	Netflix

Ethan only
Year	Title	Distribution
2022	Jerry Lee Lewis: Trouble in Mind	A24
2024	Drive-Away Dolls	Focus Features
2025	Honey Don't!	Focus Features

== Accolades ==
Year	Title	Academy Awards		BAFTA Awards		Golden Globe Awards	
Year	Title	Nominations	Wins	Nominations	Wins	Nominations	Wins
1991	Barton Fink	3				1	
1996	Fargo	7	2	6	1	4	
2000	O Brother, Where Art Thou?	2		4		2	1
2001	The Man Who Wasn't There	1		1	1	3	
2007	No Country for Old Men	8	4	9	3	4	2
2008	Burn After Reading			3		2	
2009	A Serious Man	2		1		1	
2010	True Grit	10		8	1		
2013	Inside Llewyn Davis	2		3		3	
2016	Hail, Caesar!	1		1			
2018	The Ballad of Buster Scruggs	3		1			
2021	The Tragedy of Macbeth (Note: Written and directed by Joel only)	3		1		1	
Total		42	6	38	6	21	3

=== Directed Academy Award performances ===
Under the Coen brothers' direction, these actors have received Academy Award wins or nominations for their performances in their respective roles.

Year	Performer	Film	Result
Academy Award for Best Actor
2010	Jeff Bridges	True Grit	Nominated
2021	Denzel Washington	The Tragedy of Macbeth	Nominated
Academy Award for Best Actress
1996	Frances McDormand	Fargo	Won
Academy Award for Best Supporting Actor
1991	Michael Lerner	Barton Fink	Nominated
1996	William H. Macy	Fargo	Nominated
2007	Javier Bardem	No Country for Old Men	Won
Academy Award for Best Supporting Actress
2010	Hailee Steinfeld	True Grit	Nominated

== See also ==
- List of Academy Award–winning siblings

== Bibliography ==
- King, Lynnea Chapman (2014). The Coen Brothers Encyclopedia. Lanham: Rowman & Littlefield. ISBN 9780810885769.
- Levine, Josh (2000). The Coen Brothers: The Story of Two American Filmmakers. ECW Press. ISBN 9781550224245.
