= J. Todd Anderson =

American storyboard artist (1959–2026)

- Born: March 16, 1959; Clark County, Ohio, U.S.
- Died: October 1, 2026 (aged 67); Orange, California, U.S.
- Occupation: Storyboard artist

John Todd Anderson (March 16, 1959 – October 1, 2026) was an American storyboard artist who worked with a number of filmmakers, including the Coen brothers. He also, along with film archivist and friend George Willeman and WYSO D.J. Niki Dakota, produced the radio show Filmically Perfect.

Anderson made his directorial debut in 1998 with the film The Naked Man. A few years later, he served as second unit director on the Coen brothers' Intolerable Cruelty, which earned him membership in the Directors Guild of America.

He received credit for appearing in Fargo as "Victim in Field". Instead of his name being used, he was credited with the symbol for the artist formerly known as Prince, which was turned on its side and a smiley face drawn in the circle. In addition, his name was used in the 2010 film True Grit as one of the many aliases for the outlaw Tom Chaney.

== Background ==
John Todd Anderson was born on March 16, 1959. His birthplace is reported variously as Springfield or New Carlisle, Ohio. He graduated in 1984 from Wright State University, where he majored in communication but spent the majority of his time making short films and studying film history, thereby discovering storyboarding.

== Storyboard ==
Anderson stated that his role as storyboard artist was "less creative than interpretive". When he worked with Ethan and Joel Coen, the Coens went through the movie shot by shot, and Anderson worked to "establish the scale, trap the angle, ID the character, get the action". Afterwards he sat and did a more polished drawing from the sketches drawn with the directors. After getting feedback from the filmmakers and adding several details, such as facial expressions, necessary props and arrows depicting actor and camera movement, the drawings were photocopied and given to everyone on the set. Thus, the storyboards Anderson created were vital to the smooth process and good communication on the film set.

== Pop opera ==
Anderson wrote the words and music for a pop opera entitled Nativity. It tells the story of the birth of Jesus through the eyes of angels. First performed in Dayton, Ohio, in 1995, the show was not performed again until 2008. For the piece, Anderson cited being influenced by rock operas such as Tommy and Jesus Christ Superstar as well as gospel musicals.

== Death ==
Anderson died from colon cancer at a hospital in Orange, California, on October 1, 2026, at the age of 67.

== Filmography ==
Year	Film	Credit
1987	Raising Arizona	"storyboard artist"
1989	Twister	"storyboard artist"
1990	Miller's Crossing	"storyboard artist"
1991	A Rage in Harlem	(uncredited)
1991	Little Man Tate	(uncredited)
1991	Barton Fink	"storyboard artist"
1991	The Addams Family	"storyboard artist"
1993	Addams Family Values	(uncredited)
1994	The Hudsucker Proxy	"storyboard artist"
1994	Nadja	"storyboard artist"
1994	Nell	(uncredited)
1995	Search and Destroy	"storyboard artist", as J.T. Anderson
1995	Something to Talk About	(uncredited)
1996	Fargo	"storyboard artist", also as "Victim in Field", credited by a symbol parodying that used by Prince
1996	I Love You, I Love You Not	"storyboard artist"
1998	The Big Lebowski	"storyboard artist"
1998	Overnight Delivery	"storyboard artist"
1998	American Cuisine	"storyboard artist"
1999	Weeping Shriner	"storyboard artist"
2000	O Brother, Where Art Thou?	"storyboard artist"
2001	The Man Who Wasn't There	"Hand-to-Eye Man"
2002	The Mothman Prophecies	"storyboard artist"
2002	Confessions of a Dangerous Mind	"storyboard artist"
2003	Shooting Miller's Crossing: A Conversation with Barry Sonnenfeld	"storyboard artist"
2003	Intolerable Cruelty	"Unit Limner"
2004	The Stepford Wives	"storyboard artist"
2004	The Ladykillers	"Inks and Leads"
2006	Paris, Je T'aime (segment "Tuileries")	"storyboard artist", as Todd Anderson
2007	No Country for Old Men	"Visual Consultant"
2007	A West Texas Children's Story	"storyboard artist"
2007	Have Dreams, Will Travel	"storyboard artist"
2008	Nosebleed	"storyboard artist"
2008	Leatherheads	"conceptual consultant"
2008	Burn After Reading	"Graphite Operator"
2009	A Serious Man	"Pen Grappler"
2009	Whip It	"Executive Artist"
2009	Norman	"storyboard artist"
2010	True Grit	"Drawboy"
2011	The Big Bang	"storyboard artist"
2011	Paul	"storyboard artist"
2012	Contraband	"storyboard artist"
2012	The Dictator	"storyboard artist"
2013	Inside Llewyn Davis	"Nibdipper"
2013	A Night in Old Mexico	"storyboard artist"
2014	The Bag Man	"storyboard artist"
2016	Hail, Caesar!	"storyboarded by"
2016	The Nice Guys	"storyboard artist"
2016	Warcraft	"storyboard artist"
2017	Freak Show	"storyboard artist"
2017	Suburbicon	"storyboard artist"
2018	I Got This	"storyboard artist"
2018	The Old Man and the Gun	"storyboard artist"
2018	The Ballad of Buster Scruggs	"storyboard artist"
2018	The Predator	"storyboard artist"
2019	The Peanut Butter Falcon	"storyboard artist"
2021	The Tragedy of Macbeth	"storyboard artist"
2022	Servant, episode "Ring"	"storyboard artist"
2022	The Pentaverate (6 episodes)	"storyboard artist"
2023	Fool's Paradise	"storyboard artist"
2024	Drive-Away Dolls	"storyboard artist"
2024	You Can't Run Forever	"visual consultant"
2025	Honey Don't!	"storyboard artist"
2025	Play Dirty	"storyboard artist"
2027	Jack of Spades	"storyboard artist"
