= Margaret Qualley =

American actress (born 1994)

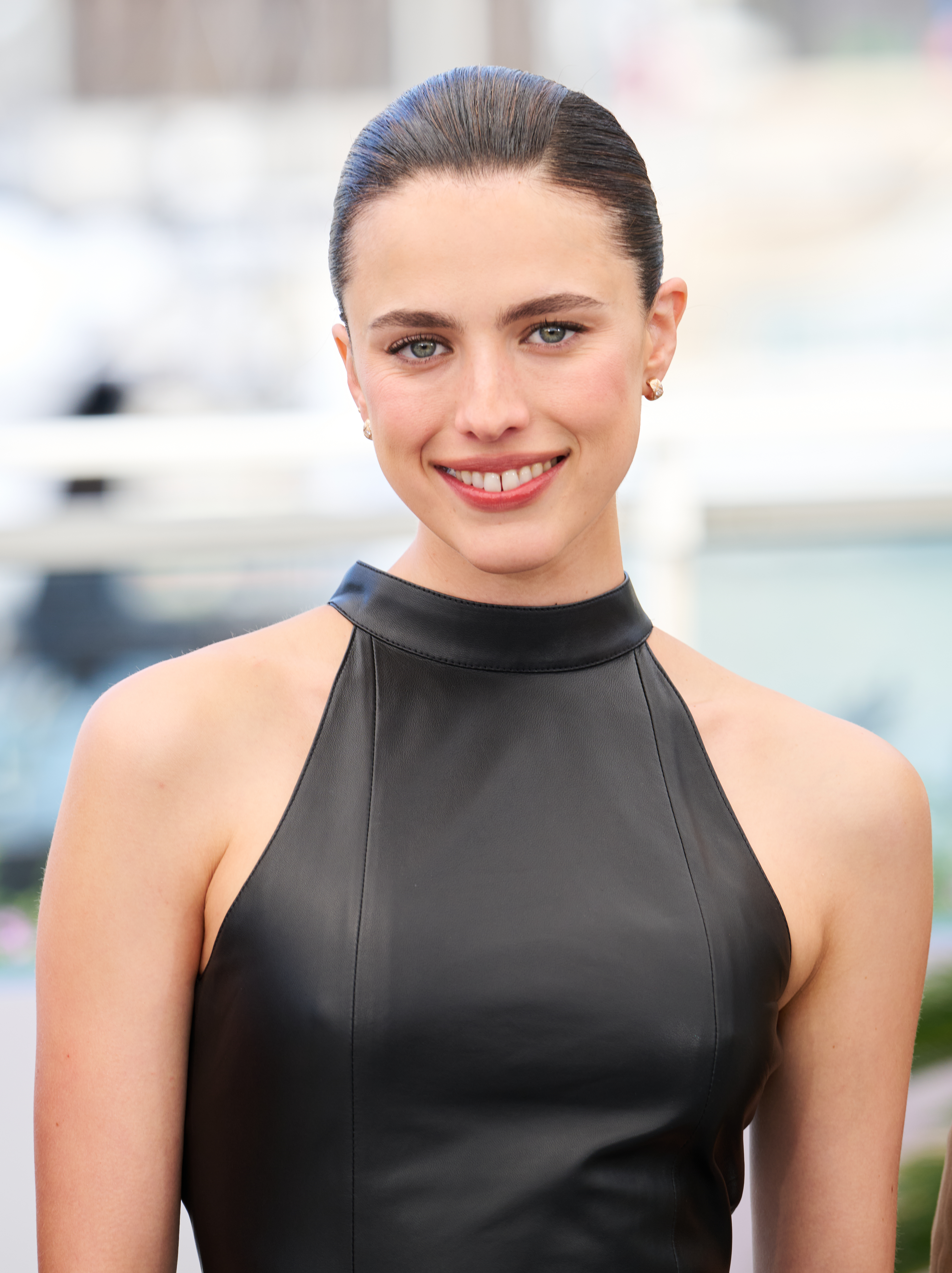
- Qualley in 2025
- Born: Sarah Margaret Qualley; October 23, 1994 (age 32); Kalispell, Montana, U.S.
- Occupation: Actress
- Years active: 2011–present
- Spouse: Jack Antonoff (m. 2023; sep. 2026)
- Mother: Andie MacDowell
- Relatives: Rainey Qualley (sister)

Sarah Margaret Qualley (/ˈkwɔːli/ KWAW-lee; born October 23, 1994) is an American actress. A daughter of actress Andie MacDowell, she trained as a ballet dancer in her youth. She made her acting debut in the 2013 drama film Palo Alto and gained recognition for her supporting role in the HBO drama series The Leftovers (2014–2017).

Qualley appeared in the films The Nice Guys (2016), Death Note (2017) and Once Upon a Time in Hollywood (2019), and the video games Death Stranding (2019) and Death Stranding 2: On the Beach (2025). She received praise and nominations for Primetime Emmy Awards for her portrayals of Ann Reinking in the FX biographical miniseries Fosse/Verdon (2019) and of the title role in the Netflix drama miniseries Maid (2021); she also received a nomination for a Golden Globe Award for the latter. Qualley has since appeared in Yorgos Lanthimos's films Poor Things (2023) and Kinds of Kindness (2024), and earned a second Golden Globe nomination for her performance in the body horror film The Substance (2024). She has also starred in Richard Linklater's film Blue Moon (2025) and Ridley Scott's post-apocalyptic drama The Dog Stars (2026).

== Early life and education ==
Sarah Margaret Qualley was born on October 23, 1994, in Kalispell, Montana. Her parents are actress and model Andie MacDowell and former model Paul Qualley. Margaret has an older brother, Justin, and an older sister, actress and singer Rainey Qualley. The family lived on a ranch in Missoula, Montana, and moved to the Asheville suburb of Biltmore Forest, North Carolina, when Margaret was four. Margaret's parents separated when she was five and she split her time equally between them for several years as they lived just 3 miles (5 km) apart. The MacDowell family home is in North Carolina.

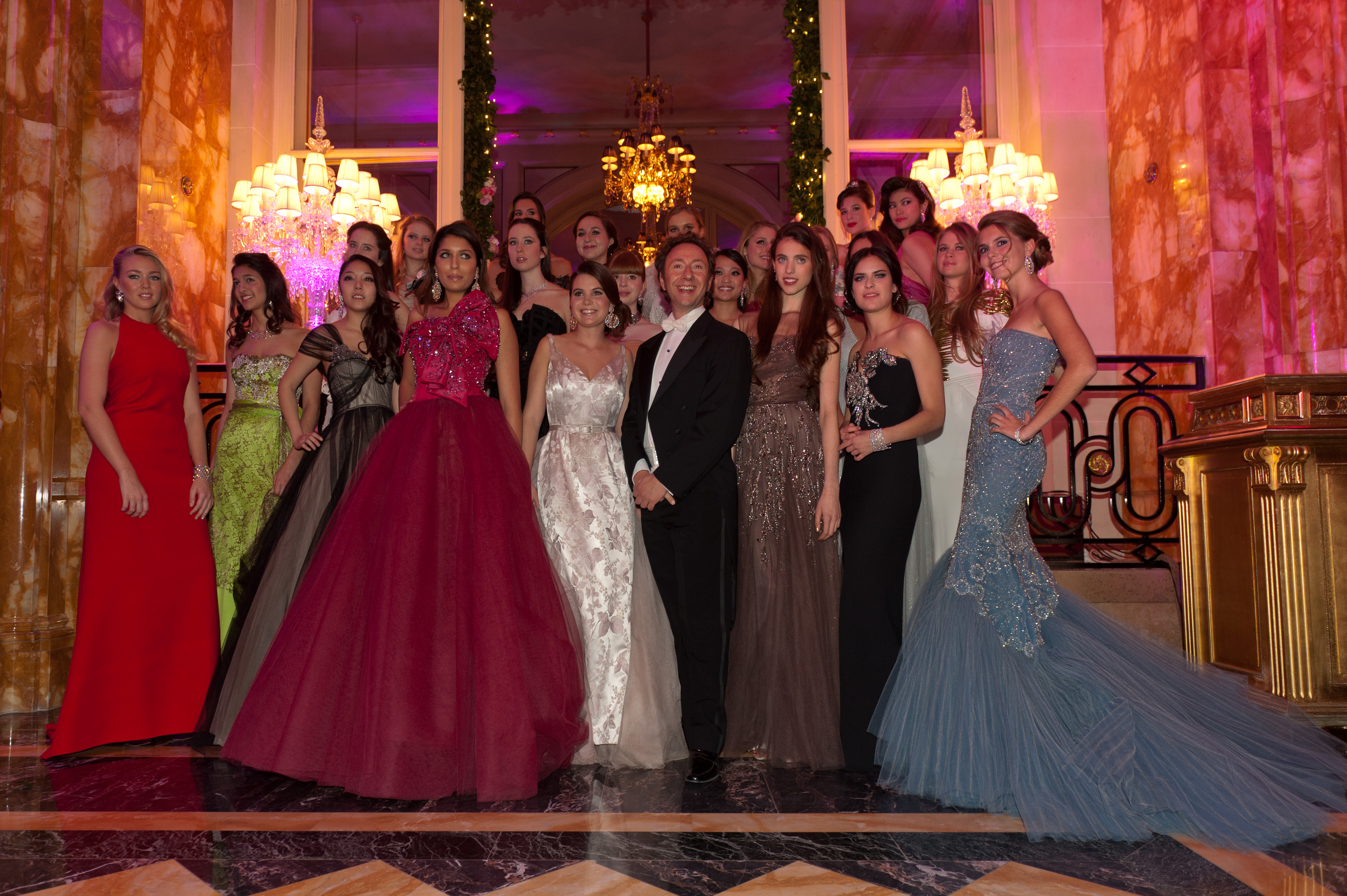
Qualley (third from right, front row) as a debutante in Paris, 2011

As a teenager growing up in Asheville, Margaret and her sister were both debutantes; they made their debuts at the Bal des débutantes in Paris. Qualley left home at 14 to board at the University of North Carolina School of the Arts, where she studied dance. She trained as a ballet dancer, earning an apprenticeship at the American Ballet Theatre and studying at New York's Professional Children's School.

At 16, after being offered an apprenticeship with the North Carolina Dance Theater, Qualley decided to quit dance. To stay in New York, she began working as a model. The modeling agency she signed with forced her to shorten her full name, and like her mother, she went by her middle name. Qualley later changed her focus to acting and attended the Royal Academy of Dramatic Art summer program in London. She attended New York University but left after a semester for acting roles.

== Career ==
=== 2011–2018: Modeling work and early roles ===
In 2011, at age 16, Qualley made her modeling debut during New York Fashion Week, walking for Alberta Ferretti. She modeled during Paris Fashion Week Spring/Summer 2012 for Valentino and Chanel. She walked for Chanel again during their Fall/Winter 2012 show. She has appeared on the covers and editorials of Evening Standard, Jolie, Teen Vogue, Paper, Elle, W, Hunger, Harper's Bazaar, Porter, Document Journal, AnOther, Interview, Vogue (and international editions Vogue Australia, Vogue China, Vogue Russia, Vogue Ukraine and youth edition Teen Vogue), Vanity Fair, Nylon, V, The Cut and C. She appeared in advertising campaigns for Kenzo, Ralph Lauren, Kate Spade, and Celine. Qualley was in numerous campaigns for Chanel, for which she is a house ambassador.

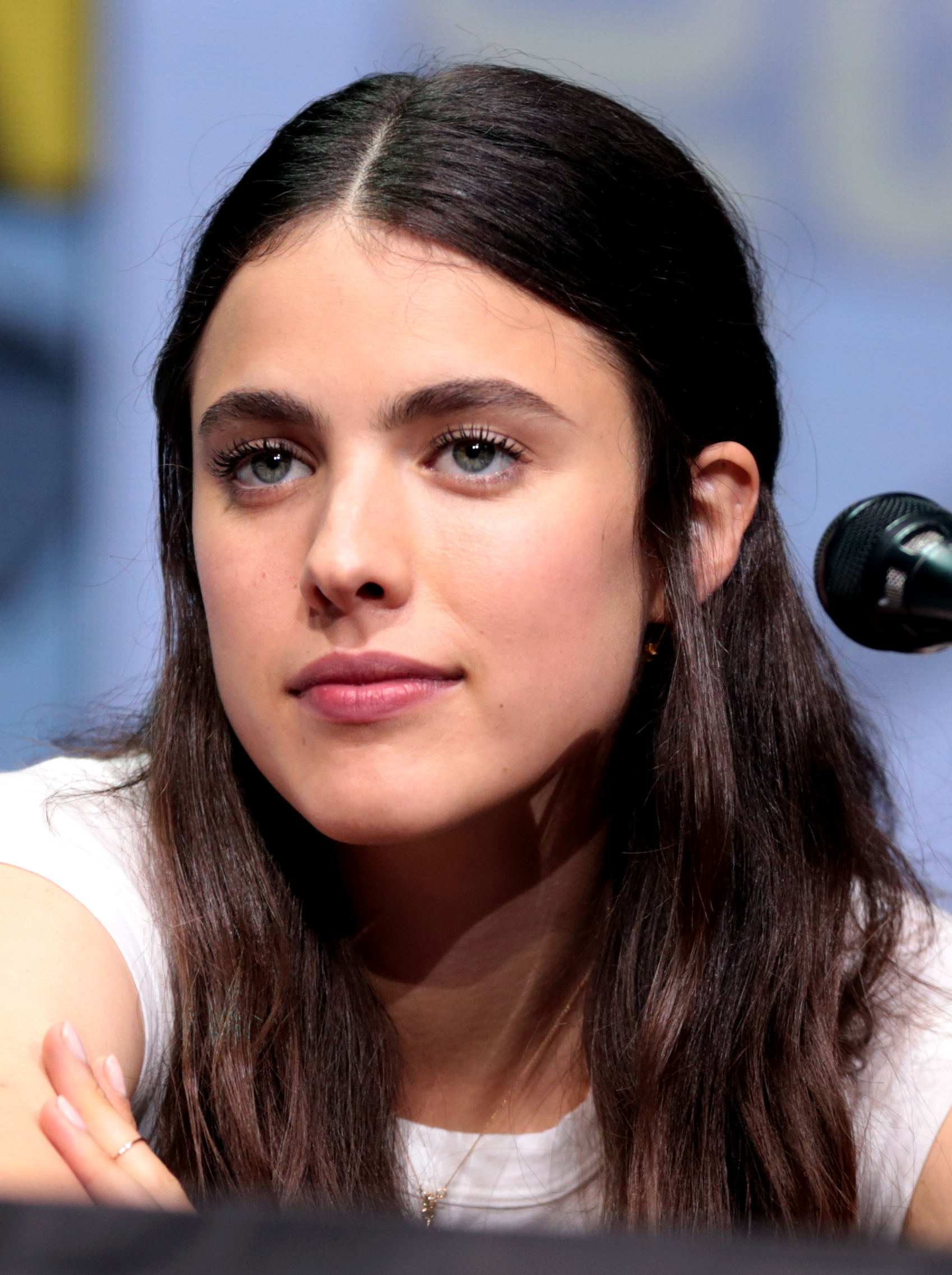
Qualley at San Diego Comic-Con in 2017

Qualley first appeared on screen in 2013, with a small part in Gia Coppola's film Palo Alto. She got the part because she happened to be on set visiting her then-boyfriend, Nat Wolff. In June 2013, she was cast as a series regular in the HBO television series The Leftovers and reprised her role as Jill Garvey for its second and third seasons in 2015 and 2017, respectively. In 2015, Qualley appeared in the short promotional film L'Américaine for American fashion label Tory Burch. In 2016, she appeared as the central character in a Spike Jonze-directed commercial for KENZO World; choreographed by Ryan Heffington, Qualley improvised much of the dance routine. She next appeared in Shane Black's 2016 comedy The Nice Guys starring Ryan Gosling and Russell Crowe.

In April 2016, Qualley was announced to have joined the cast of Shawn Christensen's The Vanishing of Sidney Hall. The film premiered at the 2017 Sundance Film Festival, alongside the film Novitiate, in which she stars as Sister Cathleen, a young woman who begins to question her faith as she trains to be a nun. The film was released on October 27, 2017. Also in 2017, Qualley starred in Death Note, directed by Adam Wingard, and appeared in the video for Soko's single "Sweet Sound of Ignorance" alongside her sister Rainey. In 2018, Qualley appeared in Donnybrook, directed by Tim Sutton and co-starring Jamie Bell and Frank Grillo. The film premiered at the 2018 Toronto International Film Festival.

=== 2019–present: Breakthrough and expansion ===
In 2019, Qualley starred in the Netflix science-fiction film IO. Also in 2019, she played Mary Dalton in Rashid Johnson's HBO adaptation of Native Son. She portrayed actress and dancer Ann Reinking in the FX miniseries Fosse/Verdon, for which she was nominated for a Primetime Emmy Award for Outstanding Supporting Actress in a Limited Series or Movie and a Critics' Choice Television Award for Best Supporting Actress in a Movie/Miniseries. She appeared in Quentin Tarantino's period comedy-drama film Once Upon a Time in Hollywood (2019), playing a member of the Manson Family named Pussycat. The film's cast was nominated for a Screen Actors Guild Award for Outstanding Performance by a Cast in a Motion Picture.

Qualley starred in Seberg (2019) opposite Kristen Stewart and Jack O'Connell, directed by Benedict Andrews. On May 29, 2019, it was revealed that Qualley would play Mama in Hideo Kojima's PlayStation 4 game Death Stranding. She also played Lockne, Mama's twin sister, in the game. In 2020, Qualley starred in Wake Up, a short film directed by Olivia Wilde, and in the feature My Salinger Year, opposite Sigourney Weaver and directed by Philippe Falardeau, which premiered at the Berlin International Film Festival in February 2020. In 2021, Qualley starred in the Netflix miniseries Maid, based on Stephanie Land's memoir. For her performance she was nominated for the Golden Globe Award for Best Actress – Miniseries or Television Film and the Screen Actors Guild Award for Outstanding Performance by a Female Actor in a Miniseries or Television Movie. In 2022, she starred in Claire Denis's Stars at Noon, opposite Joe Alwyn.

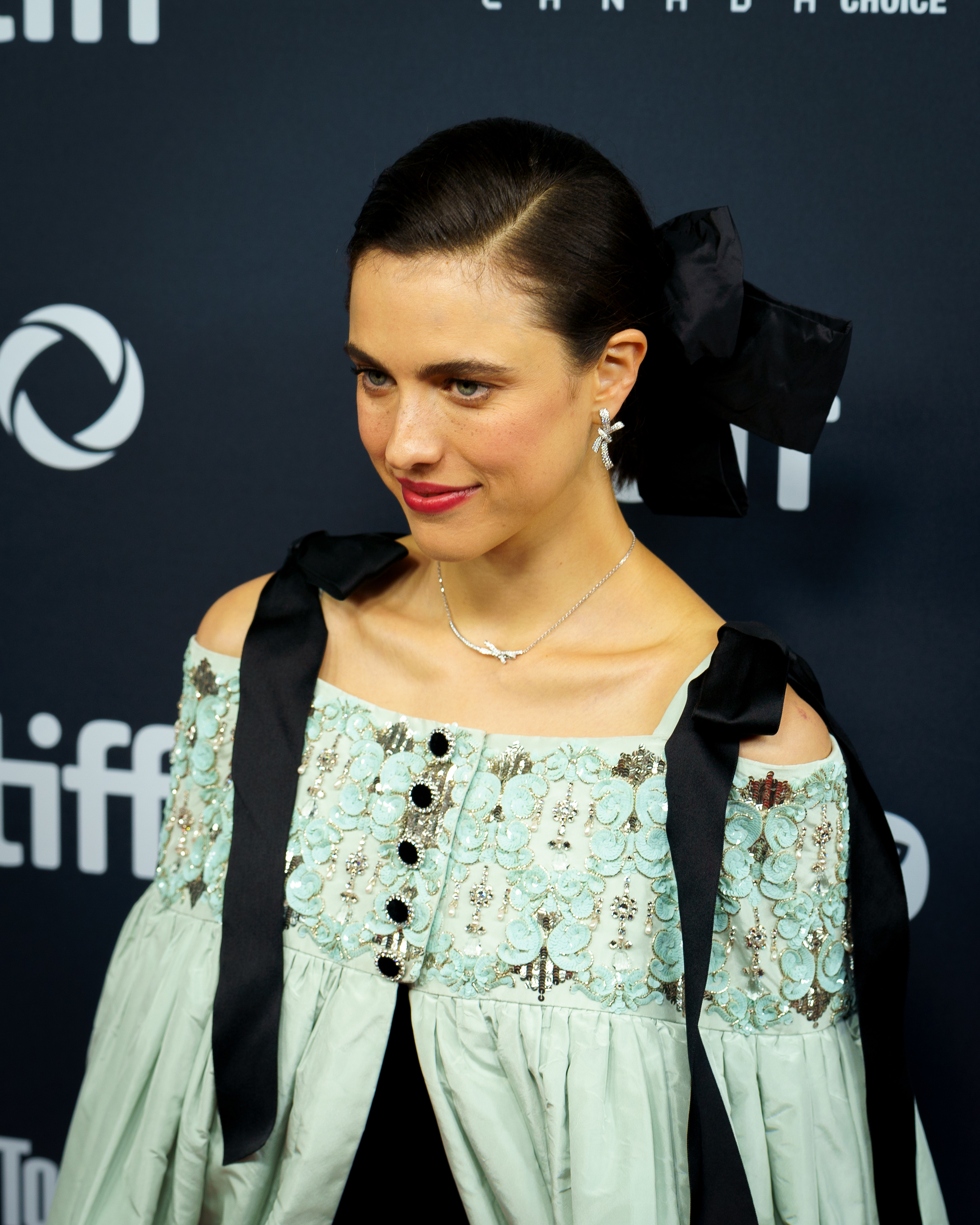
Qualley at the 2024 Toronto International Film Festival

In 2023, Qualley executive produced and starred in the erotic thriller Sanctuary opposite Christopher Abbott. Also in 2023, she appeared in Yorgos Lanthimos's surrealist fantasy film Poor Things, with Emma Stone and Mark Ruffalo. In 2024, Qualley and Geraldine Viswanathan starred in Ethan Coen's comedy road film Drive-Away Dolls. She reunited with Lanthimos and Stone in Kinds of Kindness, playing four characters in three separate storylines. The film premiered at the 2024 Cannes Film Festival. She starred in the body horror film The Substance with Demi Moore and Dennis Quaid, which also premiered at the 2024 Cannes Film Festival and earned her a Golden Globe nomination for Best Supporting Actress.

In 2025, Qualley co-starred in Richard Linklater's Blue Moon, which premiered at the 75th Berlin International Film Festival in February. She next starred in Ethan Coen's detective comedy film Honey Don't!, which premiered at the 2025 Cannes Film Festival, and had a small part in Happy Gilmore 2. She co-starred in John Patton Ford's black comedy thriller How to Make a Killing (2026) with Glen Powell and Ridley Scott's The Dog Stars with Jacob Elordi and Josh Brolin. In September 2026, it was reported that she had joined the untitled biopic of Fred Astaire, starring Tom Holland.

== Personal life ==
Qualley was living in New York City in 2019. She previously lived in Los Angeles with her sister Rainey.

Qualley was briefly romantically linked to Pete Davidson in 2019. She began dating actor Shia LaBeouf in 2020 after they were co-stars in her sister Rainey's music video "Love Me Like You Hate Me". Qualley and LaBeouf's relationship ended in January 2021 after he became the subject of several controversies, including a lawsuit for sexual battery and assault brought by his ex-girlfriend, singer FKA Twigs. In September 2021, Qualley told Harper's Bazaar that she believed FKA Twigs' allegations.

Qualley married musician Jack Antonoff on August 19, 2023, and would later star in the music videos for the songs “Tiny Moves” and "You and Forever" by his band Bleachers. She is the subject of "Margaret", a song co-written and performed by singer-songwriter Lana Del Rey from her album Did You Know That There's a Tunnel Under Ocean Blvd (2023). Qualley and Antonoff separated in July 2026 and filed a joint petition for divorce in October, after three years of marriage.

== Filmography ==
=== Film ===
| Year | Title | Role | Notes | Ref. |
|---|---|---|---|---|
| 2013 | Palo Alto | Raquel | Debut film | |
| 2016 | The Nice Guys | Amelia Kuttner | | |
| 2017 | Novitiate | Cathleen Harris | | |
| 2017 | The Vanishing of Sidney Hall | Alexandra | | |
| 2017 | Death Note | Mia Sutton | | |
| 2018 | Donnybrook | Delia Angus | | |
| 2019 | Io | Samantha "Sam" Walden | | |
| 2019 | Native Son | Mary Dalton | | |
| 2019 | Adam | Casey Freeman | | |
| 2019 | Once Upon a Time in Hollywood | "Pussycat" | | |
| 2019 | Strange but True | Melissa Moody | | |
| 2019 | Seberg | Linette Solomon | | |
| 2020 | My Salinger Year | Joanna Rakoff | | |
| 2022 | Stars at Noon | Trish Johnson | | |
| 2022 | Sanctuary | Rebecca | Also executive producer | |
| 2023 | Poor Things | Felicity | | |
| 2024 | Drive-Away Dolls | Jamie Dobbs | | |
| 2024 | Kinds of Kindness | Vivian, Martha, Ruth and Rebecca | Quadruple role | |
| 2024 | The Substance | Sue | | |
| 2025 | Blue Moon | Elizabeth Weiland | | |
| 2025 | Honey Don't! | Honey O'Donahue | | |
| 2025 | Happy Gilmore 2 | Sally | | |
| 2026 | How to Make a Killing | Julia Steinway | | |
| 2026 | The Dog Stars | Cima | | |
| 2026 | Love of Your Life | Maya | | |
| 2027 | Possession † | | Filming | |
| 2027 | King Snake † | | Post-production | |
| TBA | Untitled Fred Astaire biopic † | Adele Astaire | | |

Key
| † | Denotes films that have not yet been released |

=== Television ===
| Year | Title | Role | Notes | Ref. |
|---|---|---|---|---|
| 2014–2017 | The Leftovers | Jill Garvey | Main role (22 episodes) | |
| 2018 | Asesinato en el Hormiguero Express | Herself | Television special | |
| 2019 | Fosse/Verdon | Ann Reinking | Miniseries (5 episodes) | |
| 2020 | Acting for a Cause | Juliet | Episode: “Romeo and Juliet” | |
| 2021 | Maid | Alexandra "Alex" Russell | Main role (10 episodes) | |

=== Video games ===
| Year | Title | Voice role | Notes | Ref. |
|---|---|---|---|---|
| 2019 | Death Stranding | Mama and Lockne (Dual role) | Also provided the 3D model and motion capture for both characters | |
| 2025 | Death Stranding 2: On the Beach | Mama and Lockne (Dual role) | Likeness only | |

=== Music videos ===
| Year | Song | Artist | Notes | Ref. |
|---|---|---|---|---|
| 2017 | "Sweet Sound of Ignorance" | Soko | As the mascot dancer with sister, Rainey Qualley | |
| 2019 | "For Your Eyes Only" | Cashmere Cat | Danced as Princess Catgirl using motion capture | |
| 2019 | "Emotions" | Cashmere Cat | Danced as Princess Catgirl using motion capture | |
| 2020 | "Love Me Like You Hate Me" | Rainsford | Danced with Shia LaBeouf | |
| 2023 | "Alma Mater" | Bleachers | Cameo, as Jack Antonoff's wife | |
| 2023 | "Tiny Moves" | Bleachers | Danced as Jack Antonoff's wife | |
| 2025 | "ODDWAD" | Lace Manhattan | Singer/performer, video directed by co-star Talia Ryder as Dixie Normus for Honey Don't! soundtrack | |
| 2026 | "You and Forever" | Bleachers | Danced as Jack Antonoff's wife | |
| 2026 | "House Tour" | Sabrina Carpenter | Also co-director | |

== Awards and nominations ==
| Organizations | Year | Category | Project | Result | Ref. |
|---|---|---|---|---|---|
| Alliance of Women Film Journalists | 2024 | Best Supporting Actress | The Substance | Nominated | |
| Astra Film Awards | 2024 | Best Supporting Actress | The Substance | Nominated | |
| Astra Film Awards | 2024 | Best Performance in a Horror or Thriller | The Substance | Nominated | |
| Austin Film Critics Association | 2025 | Best Supporting Actress | The Substance | Won | |
| Chicago Film Critics Association | 2024 | Best Supporting Actress | The Substance | Nominated | |
| Capri Hollywood International Film Festival | 2019 | Best Ensemble Cast (shared with the cast) | Once Upon a Time in Hollywood | Won | |
| Critics' Choice Awards | 2019 | Best Supporting Actress in a Movie/Miniseries | Fosse/Verdon | Nominated | |
| Critics' Choice Awards | 2021 | Best Actress in a Movie/Miniseries | Maid | Nominated | |
| Critics' Choice Awards | 2024 | Best Supporting Actress | The Substance | Nominated | |
| Dallas–Fort Worth Film Critics Association | 2024 | Best Supporting Actress | The Substance | Runner-up | |
| Dorian Awards | 2025 | Supporting Film Performance of the Year | The Substance | Nominated | |
| Georgia Film Critics Association | 2024 | Best Supporting Actress | The Substance | Nominated | |
| Golden Globe Awards | 2021 | Best Actress – Miniseries or Television Film | Maid | Nominated | |
| Golden Globe Awards | 2024 | Best Supporting Actress – Motion Picture | The Substance | Nominated | |
| Houston Film Critics Society | 2025 | Best Actress - Supporting Role | The Substance | Nominated | |
| London Film Critics' Circle | 2024 | Supporting Actress of the Year | The Substance | Nominated | |
| MTV Video Music Awards | 2024 | Best Direction (with Alex Lockett) | "Tiny Moves" | Nominated | |
| MTV Video Music Awards | 2024 | Best Choreography | "Tiny Moves" | Nominated | |
| Online Film Critics Society | 2025 | Best Supporting Actress | The Substance | Won | |
| Primetime Emmy Awards | 2019 | Outstanding Supporting Actress in a Limited Series or Movie | Fosse/Verdon | Nominated | |
| Primetime Emmy Awards | 2022 | Outstanding Lead Actress in a Limited or Anthology Series or Movie | Maid | Nominated | |
| Prix Iris | 2021 | Best Actress | My Salinger Year | Nominated | |
| Satellite Awards | 2025 | Best Actress in a Supporting Role | The Substance | Nominated | |
| Saturn Awards | 2025 | Best Supporting Actress in a Film | The Substance | Nominated | |
| Screen Actors Guild Awards | 2019 | Outstanding Ensemble Cast in a Motion Picture | Once Upon a Time in Hollywood | Nominated | |
| Screen Actors Guild Awards | 2021 | Outstanding Actress in a Miniseries/Television Movie | Maid | Nominated | |
| Seattle Film Critics Society | 2024 | Best Supporting Actress | The Substance | Won | |
| Television Critics Association Awards | 2022 | Individual Achievement in Drama | Maid | Nominated | |
| Vancouver Film Critics Circle | 2025 | Best Supporting Female Actor | The Substance | Won | |
