= Tricia Cooke =

American film editor

- Born: June 25, 1965 (age 61); La Mirada, California, U.S.
- Occupations: Film editor, screenwriter, producer
- Years active: 1990–present
- Spouse: Ethan Coen (m. 1993)
- Children: 2

Tricia Cooke (born June 25, 1965) is an American editor, screenwriter and producer. She is best known for being an editor on multiple films by the Coen brothers and for her and Ethan Coen's films Drive-Away Dolls (2024) and Honey Don't! (2025).

== Early life ==
Cooke stated in a 2025 interview that she is from "Southern California, a suburb of Los Angeles." She graduated in 1989 from New York University with a degree in film.

== Career ==
After graduating, Cooke worked for a few movies in New York before someone recommended her to the production manager of Miller's Crossing (1990) by the brothers Joel and Ethan Coen. She originally worked with the film's cinematographer Barry Sonnenfeld, before becoming an apprentice editor. She continued working with the Coen brothers, including being the assistant editor for their films Barton Fink (1991) and The Hudsucker Proxy (1994) and the editor for The Big Lebowski (1998), O Brother, Where Art Thou? (2000) and The Man Who Wasn’t There (2001).

She also co-directed the comedic documentary short film Where the Girls Are (2003) with Jennifer Arnold and co-wrote and co-directed Don’t Mess With Texas (2008) with Carrie Schrader.

Cooke and Ethan Coen started writing the script for the 2024 film Drive-Away Dolls, which is Cooke's debut as a film screenwriter, in 2002. She is also the film's editor and unofficial co-director. Cooke and Coen stated that the only reason only Coen is credited as a director for the film is that Cooke is not a member of the Directors Guild of America. Drive-Away Dolls is the first film in a planned "lesbian B-movie trilogy" and was followed by Honey Don't!, released in 2025.

== Personal life ==
Cooke has been married to filmmaker Ethan Coen since 1993. They met on the set of Miller's Crossing in the winter of 1989. They have two children. Their son Buster (born c. 1996) was in 2024 working as a teacher of history and English; their daughter Dusty (born c. 2000) who in her teens appeared in a short film, attended Northwestern University where she had several editing and sound positions on the crews of short films, and in 2024 was working on a film project with Cooke. She is married to Gemma Siegler. In 2004 the family resided in the Murray Hill neighborhood in New York City.

Cooke is queer and a lesbian; she came out at the age of 21, several years before she and Coen met. Coen asked her on a date during the making of Miller's Crossing and she told him then of her sexuality; recalling the early years of their relationship, she said in 2024 they "became very close friends. And then, years later I was like, ‘This is silly. This is the person I love. I love spending time with him.’" She was in a monogamous relationship with Coen "for many years" during their marriage and describes it as now being "non-traditional", with both having separate partners outside their marriage, "for over 20 years" as of 2024. In 2024 Cooke and Coen were living in different parts of a house in New York City with their respective partners, Cooke describing her partner at the time, Lisa Fithian, as being a "radical anarchist"; and had a second home in Provincetown, Massachusetts.

=== Activism ===
Cooke is politically active, working for trans rights and queer rights and against Donald Trump. She works for Gays Against Guns and is an organiser of New York’s annual Queer Liberation March. She was arrested in Washington on February 5, 2020 while participating in a sit-in with nine other women in the Capitol rotunda on the last day of the first impeachment trial of Donald Trump; she has stated that she been arrested several other times.

== Filmography ==
Cooke has worked as an editor or associate editor on many of the Coen brothers' films. Her filmography includes the following:

- Miller's Crossing (1990)
- Barton Fink (1991)
- The Hudsucker Proxy (1994)
- Fargo (1996)
- Where the Air Is Cool and Dark (1997)
- Betty (1997)
- The Big Lebowski (1998)
- The 4th Floor (1999)
- Weeping Shriner (1999)
- O Brother, Where Art Thou? (2000)
- The Man Who Wasn't There (2001)
- Where the Girls Are (documentary) (2003) – also co-director
- The Adventures of Seinfeld & Superman (2004)
- The Notorious Bettie Page (2005)
- The Ex (2006)
- Eve (short film) (2008)
- Don’t Mess With Texas (2008) – also co-director and co-writer
- Jerry Lee Lewis: Trouble in Mind (documentary) (2022)
- Drive-Away Dolls (2024) – also co-writer and producer and uncredited co-director
- Honey Don't! (2025) – also co-writer and producer
