= The Naked Man (1998 film) =

- Theatrical release poster
- Directed by: J. Todd Anderson
- Written by: J. Todd Anderson; Ethan Coen
- Produced by: Ben Barenholtz; Robert Graf
- Starring: Michael Rapaport; Michael Jeter; Rachael Leigh Cook; Arija Bareikis
- Cinematography: Jeff Barklage
- Edited by: Mark Cretcher
- Music by: Edward Bilous
- Distributed by: Naked Man Productions
- Release date: August 1998
- Running time: 93 minutes
- Country: United States
- Language: English

The Naked Man is a 1998 comedy film, produced by Naked Man Productions, directed by J. Todd Anderson and co-written by Anderson and Ethan Coen.

== Plot ==
Dr. Edward Blis, Jr, a chiropractor by day, moonlights as a professional wrestler at night. His wrestling name is the Naked Man and he wears a naked body suit when wrestling. After his parents are killed by Sticks Varona, a cripple with crutches which double as machine guns, and an Elvis Presley impersonator, he loses his sanity. He adopts the persona of his wrestling character and goes on a rampage of revenge.

== Cast ==
- Michael Rapaport as Dr. Edward Blis, Jr.
- Michael Jeter as Sticks Varona
- John Carroll Lynch as Sticks' Driver
- Arija Bareikis as Kim Bliss
- Rachael Leigh Cook as Delores
- Joe Grifasi as Det. Koski
- John Slattery as Burns

== Production ==
The film was shot in Minnesota, and featured Jordan, Minnesota and the Minneapolis Armory.

== Music ==
An official soundtrack for the movie was never released, but the film featured a score composed by Edward Bilous. And several songs written by Anderson and Coen, such as "Baby I Need Your Number" performed by Danny Wilde of The Rembrandts "I Do" performed by Debbie Gibson and "Expelled" performed by Delbert McClinton.

== Reception ==
On Rotten Tomatoes the film has an approval rating of 20% based on reviews from 5 critics.
