= List of awards and nominations received by the Coen brothers =

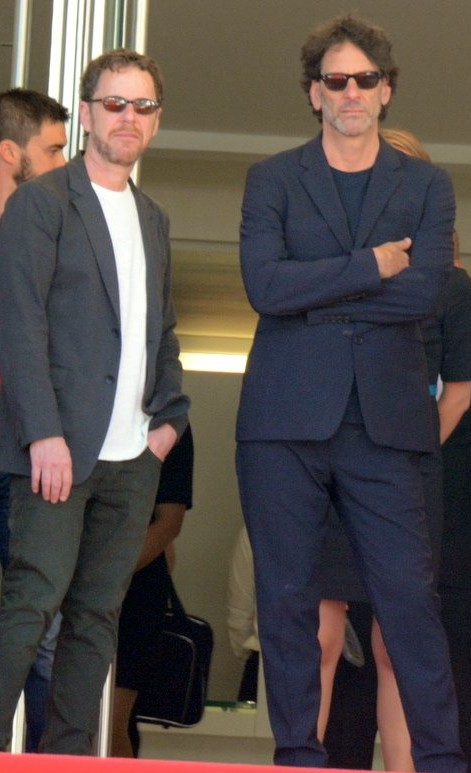
Joel and Ethan Coen at the Cannes Film Festival in 2015

This is the list of awards and nominations received by the Coen brothers (Joel Coen and Ethan Coen).

Joel Coen and Ethan Coen have received numerous accolades including four Academy Awards, two BAFTA Awards, a Golden Globe Award, a Directors Guild of America Award, three Critics' Choice Awards, and four Independent Spirit Awards as well as nominations for two Primetime Emmy Awards.

Together they have each been nominated for a total of fourteen Academy Awards (twice under their alias “Roderick Jaynes”) and have won four, including two for screenwriting (Best Original Screenplay for Fargo and Best Adapted Screenplay for No Country for Old Men), one for Best Director (No Country for Old Men), and one for Best Picture (No Country for Old Men). Twelve of their nominations were joint, but each received an individual nomination for Fargo (Joel for Best Director and Ethan for Best Picture) – thus the brothers have fifteen combined nominations.

They are two of only fourteen filmmakers with three Oscars for the same film. The others are James L. Brooks for Terms of Endearment (1983), James Cameron for Titanic (1997), Francis Ford Coppola for The Godfather Part II (1974), Alejandro G. Iñárritu for Birdman or (The Unexpected Virtue of Ignorance) (2014), Peter Jackson for The Lord of the Rings: The Return of the King (2003), Billy Wilder for The Apartment (1960), Alfonso Cuarón for Roma (2018), Bong Joon-ho for Parasite (2019) (Cuarón and Bong's films both won Best International Feature Film), Daniel Kwan and Daniel Scheinert for Everything Everywhere All at Once (2022), Sean Baker for Anora (2024), and Paul Thomas Anderson for One Battle After Another (2025).

== Major associations ==
=== Academy Awards ===
Year	Category	Nominated work	Result	Ref.
1997	Best Picture (Ethan)	Fargo	Nominated	
1997	Best Director (Joel)	Fargo	Nominated	
1997	Best Original Screenplay	Fargo	Won	
1997	Best Film Editing (as Roderick Jaynes)	Fargo	Nominated	
2001	Best Adapted Screenplay	O Brother, Where Art Thou?	Nominated	
2008	Best Picture	No Country for Old Men	Won	
2008	Best Director	No Country for Old Men	Won	
2008	Best Adapted Screenplay	No Country for Old Men	Won	
2008	Best Film Editing (as Roderick Jaynes)	No Country for Old Men	Nominated	
2010	Best Picture	A Serious Man	Nominated	
2010	Best Original Screenplay	A Serious Man	Nominated	
2011	Best Picture	True Grit	Nominated	
2011	Best Director	True Grit	Nominated	
2011	Best Adapted Screenplay	True Grit	Nominated	
2016	Best Original Screenplay	Bridge of Spies	Nominated	
2019	Best Adapted Screenplay	The Ballad of Buster Scruggs	Nominated	

=== BAFTA Awards ===
Year	Category	Nominated work	Result	Ref.
1997	Best Film (Ethan)	Fargo	Nominated	
1997	Best Direction (Joel)	Fargo	Won	
1997	Best Original Screenplay	Fargo	Nominated	
1997	Best Editing (as Roderick Jaynes)	Fargo	Nominated	
2001	Best Original Screenplay	O Brother, Where Art Thou?	Nominated	
2008	Best Film	No Country for Old Men	Nominated	
2008	Best Direction	No Country for Old Men	Won	
2008	Best Adapted Screenplay	No Country for Old Men	Nominated	
2008	Best Editing (as Roderick Jaynes)	No Country for Old Men	Nominated	
2009	Best Original Screenplay	Burn After Reading	Nominated	
2010	Best Original Screenplay	A Serious Man	Nominated	
2011	Best Film	True Grit	Nominated	
2011	Best Adapted Screenplay	True Grit	Nominated	
2014	Best Original Screenplay	Inside Llewyn Davis	Nominated	
2016	Best Original Screenplay	Bridge of Spies	Nominated	

=== Emmy Awards ===
Year	Category	Nominated work	Result	Ref.
2016	Outstanding Limited Series	Fargo (season 2)	Nominated	
2017	Outstanding Limited Series	Fargo (season 3)	Nominated	
2024	Outstanding Limited Series	Fargo (season 5)	Nominated	

=== Golden Globe Awards ===
Year	Category	Nominated work	Result	Ref.
1997	Best Motion Picture – Musical or Comedy (Ethan)	Fargo	Nominated	
1997	Best Director (Joel)	Fargo	Nominated	
1997	Best Screenplay	Fargo	Nominated	
2001	Best Motion Picture – Musical or Comedy (Ethan)	O Brother, Where Art Thou?	Nominated	
2002	Best Motion Picture – Drama	The Man Who Wasn't There	Nominated	
2002	Best Screenplay	The Man Who Wasn't There	Nominated	
2008	Best Motion Picture – Drama	No Country for Old Men	Nominated	
2008	Best Director	No Country for Old Men	Nominated	
2008	Best Screenplay	No Country for Old Men	Won	
2009	Best Motion Picture – Musical or Comedy	Burn After Reading	Nominated	
2014	Best Motion Picture – Musical or Comedy	Inside Llewyn Davis	Nominated	
2014	Best Original Song	"Please Mr. Kennedy", Inside Llewyn Davis	Nominated	

== Guild awards ==
=== Directors Guild of America Awards ===
Year	Category	Nominated work	Result	Ref.
1996	Outstanding Directorial Achievement in Motion Pictures	Fargo (Joel)	Nominated	
2007	Outstanding Directorial Achievement in Motion Pictures	No Country for Old Men	Won	

=== Producers Guild of America Awards ===
Year	Category	Nominated work	Result	Ref.
2007	Outstanding Producer of Theatrical Motion Pictures	No Country for Old Men	Won	
2010	Outstanding Producer of Theatrical Motion Pictures	True Grit	Nominated	
2014	Outstanding Producer of Long-Form Television	Fargo	Won	
2016	Outstanding Producer of Long-Form Television	Fargo	Won	
2018	Outstanding Producer of Long-Form Television	Fargo	Nominated	

=== Writers Guild of America Awards ===
Year	Category	Nominated work	Result	Ref.
1996	Best Original Screenplay	Fargo	Won	
2001	Best Original Screenplay	The Man Who Wasn't There	Nominated	
2007	Best Adapted Screenplay	No Country for Old Men	Won	
2008	Best Original Screenplay	Burn After Reading	Nominated	
2010	Best Adapted Screenplay	True Grit	Nominated	
2011	Best Original Screenplay	A Serious Man	Nominated	
2015	Best Original Screenplay	Bridge of Spies	Nominated	

== Miscellaneous accolades ==
=== Critics Choice Movie Awards ===
Year	Category	Nominated work	Result	Ref.
1996	Best Picture (Ethan)	Fargo	Won	
1996	Best Director (Joel)	Fargo	Nominated	
1996	Best Screenplay	Fargo	Nominated	
2001	Best Picture (Ethan)	The Man Who Wasn't There	Nominated	
2001	Best Screenplay	The Man Who Wasn't There	Nominated	
2007	Best Picture	No Country for Old Men	Won	
2007	Best Director	No Country for Old Men	Won	
2007	Best Screenplay	No Country for Old Men	Nominated	
2008	Best Comedy	Burn After Reading	Nominated	
2009	Best Picture	A Serious Man	Nominated	
2009	Best Screenplay	A Serious Man	Nominated	
2010	Best Picture	True Grit	Nominated	
2010	Best Director	True Grit	Nominated	
2010	Best Screenplay	True Grit	Nominated	
2013	Best Picture	Inside Llewyn Davis	Nominated	
2013	Best Screenplay	Inside Llewyn Davis	Nominated	
2016	Best Comedy	Hail, Caesar!	Nominated	

=== Independent Spirit Awards ===
Year	Category	Nominated work	Result	Ref.
1985	Best Director (Joel)	Blood Simple	Won	
1985	Best Screenplay	Blood Simple	Nominated	
1996	Best Director (Joel)	Fargo	Won	
1996	Best Screenplay	Fargo	Won	
2009	Best Director	A Serious Man	Nominated	
2009	Robert Altman Award	A Serious Man	Won	
2013	Best Feature	Inside Llewyn Davis	Nominated	

=== Saturn Awards ===
Year	Category	Nominated work	Result	Ref.
1996	Best Director (Joel)	Fargo	Nominated	
1996	Best Action or Adventure Film	Fargo	Won	
2001	Best Action or Adventure Film	The Man Who Wasn't There	Nominated	
2007	Best Action or Adventure Film	No Country for Old Men	Nominated	
2007	Best Writing	No Country for Old Men	Nominated	
2010	Best Action or Adventure Film	True Grit	Nominated	
2013	Best Independent Film	Inside Llewyn Davis	Nominated	
2013	Best Writing	Inside Llewyn Davis	Nominated	

== Festival awards ==
=== Cannes Film Festival ===
Year	Category	Nominated work	Result	Ref.
1991	Palme d'Or	Barton Fink	Won	
1991	Best Director (Joel Coen)	Barton Fink	Won	
1994	Palme d'Or	The Hudsucker Proxy	Nominated	
1996	Palme d'Or	Fargo	Nominated	
1996	Best Director (Joel Coen)	Fargo	Won	
2000	Palme d'Or	O Brother, Where Art Thou?	Nominated	
2001	Palme d'Or	The Man Who Wasn't There	Nominated	
2001	Best Director (Joel Coen)	The Man Who Wasn't There	Won	
2004	Palme d'Or	The Ladykillers	Nominated	
2007	Palme d'Or	No Country for Old Men	Nominated	
2013	Palme d'Or	Inside Llewyn Davis	Nominated	
2013	Grand Prix	Inside Llewyn Davis	Won	

=== Venice Film Festival ===
Year	Category	Nominated work	Result	Ref.
2018	Golden Lion	The Ballad of Buster Scruggs	Nominated	
2018	Golden Osella for Best Screenplay	The Ballad of Buster Scruggs	Won	

== Critics associations ==
=== National Board of Review ===
Year	Category	Nominated work	Result	Ref.
1996	Best Director	Fargo	Won	
2007	Best Film	No Country for Old Men	Won	
2007	Best Adapted Screenplay	No Country for Old Men	Won	
2009	Best Original Screenplay	A Serious Man	Won	
2013	Best Original Screenplay	Inside Llewyn Davis	Won	

=== National Society of Film Critics ===
Year	Category	Nominated work	Result	Ref.
1988	Best Screenplay	Raising Arizona	Nominated	
2007	Best Director	No Country for Old Men	Nominated	
2009	Best Screenplay	A Serious Man	Won	
2013	Best Film	Inside Llewyn Davis	Won	
2013	Best Director	Inside Llewyn Davis	Won	
2013	Best Screenplay	Inside Llewyn Davis	Won	

=== New York Film Critics Circle ===
Year	Category	Nominated work	Result	Ref.
2007	Best Director	No Country for Old Men	Won	
2007	Best Screenplay	No Country for Old Men	Won	

=== Los Angeles Film Critics Association ===
Year	Category	Nominated work	Result	Ref.
1996	Best Director	Fargo	Won	
1996	Best Screenplay	Fargo	Won	

=== London Film Critics Circle ===
Year	Category	Nominated work	Result	Ref.
1996	Director of the Year	Fargo	Won	
1996	Screenwriter of the Year	Fargo	Won	
2000	Screenwriter of the Year	O Brother, Where Art Thou?	Nominated	
2001	Screenwriter of the Year	The Man Who Wasn't There	Won	
2007	Director of the Year	No Country for Old Men	Nominated	
2007	Screenwriter of the Year	No Country for Old Men	Nominated	
2010	Director of the Year	True Grit	Nominated	
2010	Screenwriter of the Year	True Grit	Nominated	
2013	Screenwriter of the Year	Inside Llewyn Davis	Won	

=== Chicago Film Critics Association ===
Year	Category	Nominated work	Result	Ref.
1991	Best Screenplay	Miller's Crossing	Nominated	
1992	Best Director	Barton Fink	Nominated	
1992	Best Screenplay	Barton Fink	Nominated	
1997	Best Director	Fargo	Won	
1997	Best Screenplay	Fargo	Won	
2007	Best Director	No Country for Old Men	Won	
2007	Best Adapted Screenplay	No Country for Old Men	Won	
2009	Best Director	A Serious Man	Nominated	
2009	Best Original Screenplay	A Serious Man	Nominated	
2010	Best Adapted Screenplay	True Grit	Nominated	
2013	Best Director	Inside Llewyn Davis	Nominated	
2013	Best Original Screenplay	Inside Llewyn Davis	Nominated	
2015	Best Original Screenplay	Bridge of Spies	Nominated	
