= Ethan Coen =

American filmmaker (born 1957)

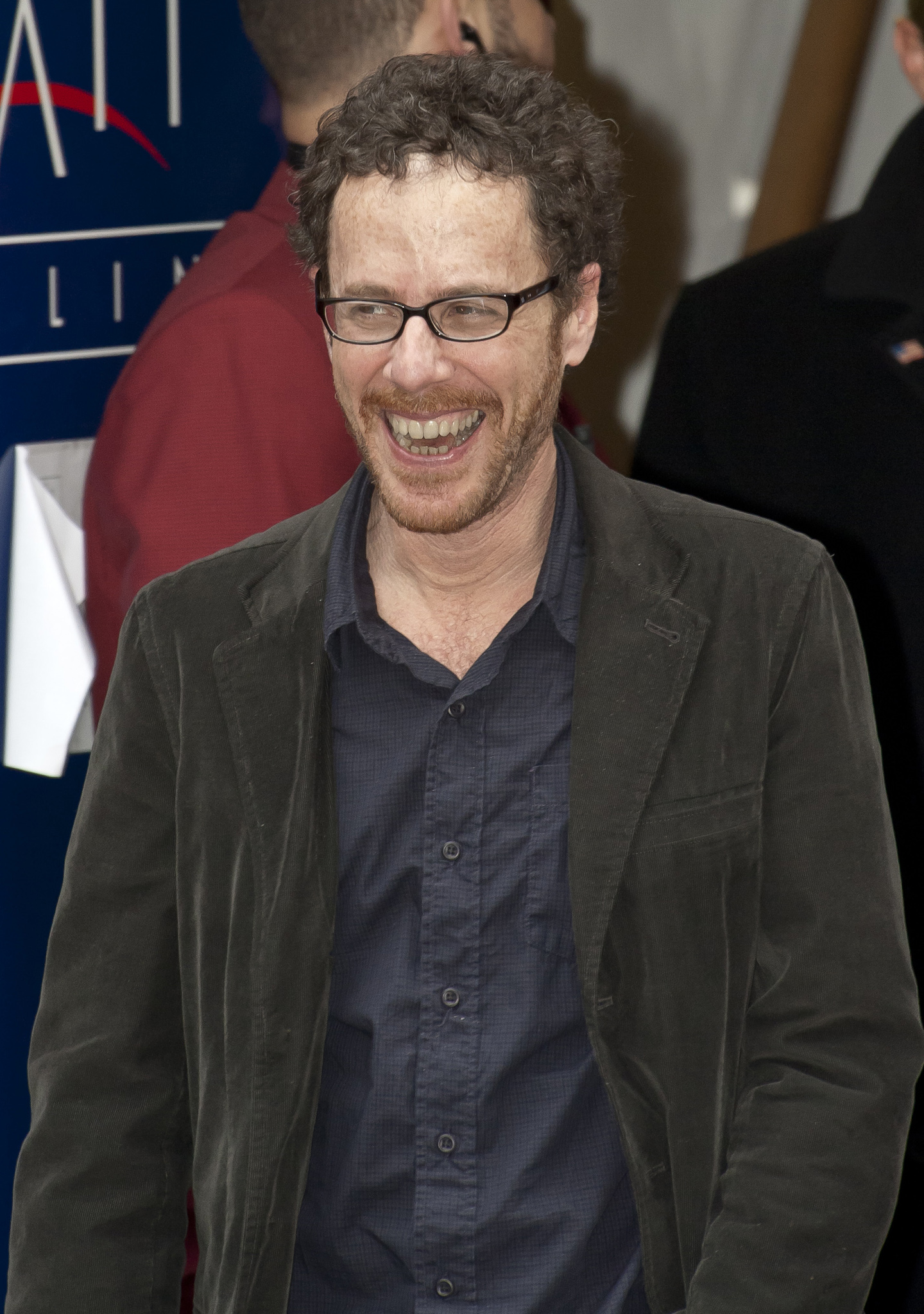
- Coen in 2011
- Born: Ethan Jesse Coen; September 21, 1957 (age 69); St. Louis Park, Minnesota, U.S.
- Education: Bard College at Simon's Rock (AA); Princeton University (BA)
- Occupations: Film director; producer; screenwriter; editor
- Years active: 1984–present
- Spouse: Tricia Cooke (m. 1993)
- Children: 2
- Relatives: Joel Coen (brother); Frances McDormand (sister-in-law)
- Awards: Full list

Ethan Jesse Coen (born September 21, 1957) is an American filmmaker. Working alongside his brother Joel, he has directed, written, edited and produced many feature films, the most acclaimed of which include Blood Simple (1984), Raising Arizona (1987), Miller's Crossing (1990), Barton Fink (1991), Fargo (1996), The Big Lebowski (1998), O Brother, Where Art Thou? (2000), The Ladykillers (2004), No Country for Old Men (2007), Burn After Reading (2008), A Serious Man (2009), True Grit (2010), Inside Llewyn Davis (2013), Hail, Caesar! (2016) and The Ballad of Buster Scruggs (2018).

The duo began directing separately in the 2020s. Ethan's first solo directorial work was Jerry Lee Lewis: Trouble in Mind, a documentary about the titular singer-songwriter. His first solo feature film was 2024's Drive-Away Dolls, which was co-written by his wife Tricia Cooke. His following solo feature film, Honey Don't!, premiered at the 2025 Cannes Film Festival.

The brothers, together, have won four Academy Awards from 13 nominations; one for writing Fargo, and three for writing, directing, and producing No Country For Old Men. They also won a Palme d'Or for Barton Fink.

== Early life and education ==
Ethan Jesse Coen was born on September 21, 1957, three years after his brother. They were born and raised in St. Louis Park, Minnesota, a suburb of Minneapolis. Their mother, Rena (née Neumann; 1925–2001), was an art historian at St. Cloud State University, and their father, Edward Coen (1919–2012), was a professor of economics at the University of Minnesota. The brothers have an older sister, Deborah, who is a psychiatrist in Israel.

Both sides of the Coen family were Eastern European Ashkenazi Jews. Their paternal grandfather, Victor Coen, was a barrister in the Inns of Court in London before retiring to Hove with their grandmother. Edward Coen was an American citizen born in the United States, but grew up in Croydon, London and studied at the London School of Economics. Afterwards he moved to the United States, where he met the Coens' mother, and served in the United States Army during World War II.

Ethan graduated from St. Louis Park High School in 1976, and from Bard College at Simon's Rock in Great Barrington, Massachusetts. He went on to Princeton University and earned an undergraduate degree in philosophy in 1979. His senior thesis was a 41-page essay, "Two Views of Wittgenstein's Later Philosophy", which was supervised by Raymond Geuss.

== Career ==
=== With Joel ===
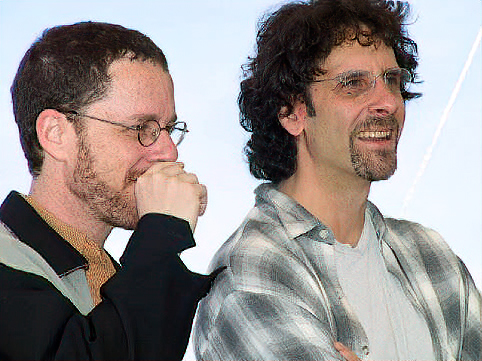
Ethan and Joel at the 2001 Cannes Film Festival

The duo made their debut with Blood Simple (1984), a neo-noir starring John Getz, Frances McDormand, Dan Hedaya and M. Emmet Walsh. Due to DGA regulations, Joel received sole directing credit while Ethan received sole production credit. This would remain the case until 2004's The Ladykillers. It marked the first of many collaborations between the Coens and composer Carter Burwell. It was also the screen debut of Joel's wife, McDormand, who went on to feature in many of the Coens' films.

The brothers wanted to follow their debut with something fast-paced and funny. They directed Raising Arizona (1987), which starred Nicolas Cage and Holly Hunter, and marked the first of many collaborations between the Coens and John Goodman. The two continued to direct throughout the 1990s, with the black comedy thriller Barton Fink (1991) winning the Palme d'Or and being nominated for one Oscar. They directed Fargo (1996), a black comedy crime film that won many accolades, including the Academy Award for Best Actress for star Frances McDormand, as well as winning the brothers Best Original Screenplay, their first Oscar win. The Big Lebowski (1998) is a crime comedy following Jeff "The Dude" Lebowski (Jeff Bridges). It became a cult classic.

Other Oscar-nominated films the duo directed in the 2000s included O Brother, Where Art Thou? (2000) and The Man Who Wasn't There (2001). In 2007, the two made No Country for Old Men, adapted from the 2005 novel of the same name by Cormac McCarthy. The film stars Josh Brolin, Tommy Lee Jones and Javier Bardem. No Country received nearly universal critical praise, garnering a 94% "Fresh" rating at Rotten Tomatoes. It won four Academy Awards, including Best Picture, Best Director and Best Adapted Screenplay, all of which were received by the Coens, as well as Best Supporting Actor received by Bardem for his portrayal of hitman Anton Chigurh. The Coens, as "Roderick Jaynes", were also nominated for Best Editing, but didn't win. It was the first time since 1962 (when Jerome Robbins and Robert Wise won for West Side Story) that two directors received the Academy Award for Best Director at the same time.

Other well-received films they directed together throughout the next decade included A Serious Man (2009), True Grit (2010), Inside Llewyn Davis (2013), Hail Caesar! (2016) and The Ballad of Buster Scruggs (2018). They also co-wrote the script for Steven Spielberg's Bridge of Spies (2015).

=== Solo work ===
In 2019, it was rumored that Joel would be directing an adaptation of Macbeth starring Denzel Washington and Frances McDormand. The film, titled The Tragedy of Macbeth, was Joel's first directorial effort without Ethan, who was taking a break from films to focus on theater.

Ethan directed the documentary Jerry Lee Lewis: Trouble in Mind, which was edited by his wife Tricia Cooke and was shown at the 2022 Cannes Film Festival. In 2022, Ethan directed the road comedy Drive-Away Dolls, co-written by Cooke. It was released by Focus Features, and was Ethan's first narrative film without his brother. The film was released on February 22, 2024, to mixed reviews. On the review aggregator website Rotten Tomatoes, 63% of 247 critics' reviews are positive, with an average rating of 6.1/10. The website's consensus reads: "The appealing odd-couple chemistry between Margaret Qualley and Geraldine Viswanathan helps Drive-Away Dolls power past its overly familiar screenplay and erratic execution."

His next film Honey Don't! was released in 2025. Drive-Away Dolls and Honey Don't! have been described as the first and second in a "lesbian B-movie trilogy." Both films star Margaret Qualley. Coen and Cooke have discussed making a third film titled Go Beavers. The duo have characterized these films as dark comedies similar in tone to earlier Coen brothers works, such as Raising Arizona, but with sexual content the brothers did not typically include in their collaborations. The release of this trilogy is the outcome of 20 years of writing by Coen and Cooke.

=== Other work ===
Coen has written multiple plays. In January 2008, Coen's play Almost an Evening premiered off-Broadway at the Atlantic Theater Company Stage 2, opening to mostly enthusiastic reviews. The initial run closed on February 10, 2008, but the same production was moved to a new theatre for a commercial off-Broadway run at the Bleecker Street Theater in New York City. Produced by The Atlantic Theater Company, it ran there from March 2008 through June 1, 2008. and Art Meets Commerce. In May 2009, the Atlantic Theater Company produced Coen's Offices, as part of their mainstage season at the Linda Gross Theater. In 2011, Coen wrote the one-act comedy Talking Cure, which was produced on Broadway in 2011 as part of Relatively Speaking, an anthology of three one-act plays by Coen, Elaine May, and Woody Allen. Coen also published Gates of Eden, a collection of short stories, in 1998.

== Personal life ==
Coen married film editor Tricia Cooke in 1993. They have two children: daughter Dusty and son Buster Jacob. The two describe their relationship as "nontraditional"; Cooke is both queer and a lesbian and Coen is straight, and they both have separate partners. They live together in New York.

== See also ==
- List of Academy Award–winning siblings

== Sources ==
- King, Lynnea Chapman (2014). The Coen Brothers Encyclopedia. Lanham: Rowman & Littlefield. ISBN 9780810885769.
- Levine, Josh (2000). The Coen Brothers: The Story of Two American Filmmakers. ECW Press. ISBN 9781550224245.
