= Gates of Eden (short story collection) =

Collection of short stories by Ethan Coen

- First edition
- Author: Ethan Coen
- Language: English
- Genre: Short stories
- Published: 1998
- Publisher: William Morrow and Company
- Publication place: United States
- Pages: 261 pp

Gates of Eden is a collection of short stories written by Ethan Coen, first published in 1998.

The title comes from one of the stories in the book with reference to the biblical Garden of Eden. The stories within the book range from traditional fiction to stories formatted like a radio script.

There is an abridged version on audiobook which includes 11 of the 14 stories read by actors, many of whom have starred in Coen brothers films.

One story in the collection was adapted into a short film, A Fever in the Blood, released in 2002 and directed by Andrew Pulver.

== Reception ==
Gates of Eden was well reviewed for its combination of strong dialogue, effective comedy, and darker, often violent subject matter―elements Coen was known for in his films. Several stories also focus on Jewish characters growing up near Minneapolis, where Coen is from, which a New York Times reviewer suspected of "being at least grounded in autobiography."

== Stories ==
- "Destiny"
- "The Old Country"
- "Cosa Minapolidan"
- "Hector Berlioz, Private Investigator"
- "Have You Ever Been to Electric Ladyland"
- "A Morty Story"
- "A Fever in the Blood"
- "The Boys"
- "Johnnie Ga-Botz"
- "I Killed Phil Shapiro"
- "It Is an Ancient Mariner"
- "Gates of Eden"
- "The Old Boys"
- "Red Wing"

== Audiobook ==
- "It is an Ancient Mariner", read by John Goodman
- "Cosa Minapolidan", read by John Turturro
- "Have You Ever Been to Electric Ladyland", read by Steve Buscemi
- "Destiny", read by Matt Dillon
- "The Old Country", read by Liev Schreiber
- "Gates of Eden", read by William H. Macy
- "I Killed Phil Shapiro", read by Ben Stiller
- "A Fever in the Blood", read by Steve Buscemi
- "A Morty Story", read by Liev Schreiber
- "The Boys", read by John Turturro
- "Red Wing", read by Bain Boehlke
