= Almost an Evening =

- Original language: English
- Written by: Ethan Coen
- Genre: Three one act plays

Premiere
- Date: 2008

Almost an Evening is a series of three one-act plays written by Ethan Coen and directed by Neil Pepe. It premiered Off-Broadway in January 2008 at the Atlantic Theater Company Stage 2. After its initial run through February 10, 2008 it was transferred to the Bleecker Street Theater. Almost an Evening began previews March 20, 2008 and ran through June 1, 2008. The commercial run is the first partnership with Art Meets Commerce and the Atlantic Theater Company.

== Plays ==
- Waiting – Someone waits somewhere for quite some time.
- Four Benches – His voyage to self-discovery takes a British intelligence agent to steam baths in New York and Texas, and to park benches in the U.S. and U.K.
- Debate – Cosmic questions are taken up. Not much is learned.

== Characters and casts ==
Atlantic Theatre Company Cast

- F. Murray Abraham - Control/God Who Judges
- J.R. Horne - Mr.Broodhum/Angel 2/Understudy
- Jordan Lage - Mr. Sebatacheck/Texan/Young Man
- Mark Linn-Baker - McMartin/God Who Loves
- Mary McCann - Receptionist/Young Woman
- Del Pentecost - Polhemus/Earl/Angel 1
- Joey Slotnick - Nelson/Waiter
- Jonathan Cake - One/Maitere D'
- Elizabeth Marvel - Woman with Pram/Lady Friend

Bleecker Street Theatre Cast

- F. Murray Abraham - Control/God Who Judges
- J.R. Horne - Mr.Broodhum/Angel 2/Understudy
- Jordan Lage - Mr. Sebatacheck/Texan/Young Man
- Mark Linn-Baker - McMartin/God Who Loves
- Mary McCann - Receptionist/Young Woman
- Del Pentecost - Polhemus/Earl/Angel 1
- Joey Slotnick - Nelson/Waiter
- Tim Hopper- One/Maitere D'
- Johanna Day - Woman with Pram/Lady Friend

== Critical response ==
Head Critic for The New York Times, Ben Brantley stated:
“Tasty, bite-sized comedies. Nimbly directed by Neil Pepe. Theatergoers nostalgic for the urbane, mind-teasing divertissements that once flourished Off-Broadway should leave happily hungry. A dream team.”

Melissa Rose Bernardo from Entertainment Weekly stated:
“Boisterous and fun [...] Coen couldn’t ask for a better production than this Atlantic Theater Company treatment.”

Linda Winer from Newsday Stated:
“Gleeful, thoughtful and darkly loopy. These new, lean pieces mark the serious stage debut of a shrewd and weirdly endearing comic voice.”
