= Drive-Away Dolls =

2024 American film by Ethan Coen

- Theatrical release poster
- Directed by: Ethan Coen
- Written by: Ethan Coen; Tricia Cooke
- Produced by: Ethan Coen; Tricia Cooke; Robert Graf; Tim Bevan; Eric Fellner
- Starring: Margaret Qualley; Geraldine Viswanathan; Beanie Feldstein; Colman Domingo; Pedro Pascal; Bill Camp; Matt Damon
- Cinematography: Ari Wegner
- Edited by: Tricia Cooke
- Music by: Carter Burwell
- Production company: Working Title Films
- Distributed by: Focus Features (United States); Universal Pictures (International)
- Release dates: February 22, 2024 (Australia); February 23, 2024 (United States)
- Running time: 84 minutes
- Countries: United Kingdom; United States
- Language: English
- Box office: $7.9 million

Drive-Away Dolls (alternatively titled onscreen as Henry James' Drive-Away Dykes) is a 2024 crime comedy road film directed by Ethan Coen from a screenplay he co-wrote with his wife Tricia Cooke, who was also the film's editor and uncredited co-director. The two produced the film with Robert Graf and Working Title's Tim Bevan and Eric Fellner.

Set in 1999, the film stars Margaret Qualley and Geraldine Viswanathan as two lesbian best friends on a road trip through the Eastern United States, who become involved in a criminal scheme along the way. The film co-stars Beanie Feldstein, Colman Domingo, Pedro Pascal, Bill Camp and Matt Damon. It is Coen's first narrative feature without his brother Joel; Ethan Coen had previously directed the 2022 archival documentary Jerry Lee Lewis: Trouble in Mind.

Drive-Away Dolls was released in Australia on February 22, 2024, and in the United States by Focus Features the following day. It received mixed reviews from critics. The film is the first installment in Coen and Cooke's planned "lesbian B-movie trilogy," and was followed in 2025 by Honey Don't!, also starring Qualley.

== Plot ==
At a bar in Philadelphia in 1999, a man named Santos sits in a booth while nervously clutching a briefcase. He exits in a hurry and is followed by the bartender, who murders and decapitates him in an alley.

Elsewhere in Philadelphia, Jamie and Sukie are lovers whose relationship unravels over Jamie's infidelity with Carla. After Sukie kicks her out of their apartment, Jamie learns that her friend Marian is planning a trip to Tallahassee, Florida and decides to tag along. They head to a drive-away car service where someone can transport a car one-way for another client. Due to a misunderstanding, they are given a car that was already booked for a trip to Tallahassee.

Moments later, a trio of criminals consisting of Arliss, Flint, and Chief comes to the shop to pick up the car headed to Tallahassee. They find that Jamie and Marian have taken it by accident, along with unspecified cargo tied to their illegal dealings.

While Marian wants to go straight to Tallahassee, Jamie constantly tries to convince Marian to loosen up by taking detours and trying to have casual sex at lesbian bars along the way. Marian prefers to read Henry James' The Europeans on the trip, but slowly comes out of her shell due to Jamie's prodding.

When the pair finally enters Florida, their car gets a flat tire. They open the trunk and find the briefcase Santos was holding and a basket containing Santos' preserved head.

Jamie and Marian are followed by Arliss and Flint, who are led on a wild goose chase by a soccer team who had invited Jamie and Marian to a party. When Jamie and Marian check into a hotel using Jamie's credit card, the mob is tipped off to their location. Jamie convinces Marian that she needs to have a positive sexual experience to enjoy life more, and they have sex where Marian climaxes. Arliss, Flint, and Chief arrive in Tallahassee. Jamie decides to use the contents of Santos' briefcase: a collection of dildos that were created from plaster casts of men's erect penises, including one of Senator Gary Channel. Marian is shocked upon finding her with Channel's dildo, but Jamie insists that she wants the sexual release that Marian had the night before.

Arliss and Flint burst into their room, retrieve Santos' head and the briefcase, and abduct Jamie and Marian at gunpoint. The women are tied to chairs and gagged in a backroom at a dog racing track. Chief arrives to meet them all and explains that the sex toys are created from plaster moulds from the genitals of influential public figures by Tiffany Plastercaster.

Channel is fearful that his reputation will be ruined if anyone learns of the dildo, which Jamie had used and left behind in the hotel room. After the gangsters have an argument that leads to Flint shooting the other two dead and running away, Jamie and Marian escape. They briefly make a plan to retrieve the last dildo and regroup at a new hotel. Once there, Jamie and Marian shower together, where Marian states that she wants to make love with Senator Channel's dildo, which they do. Then, they decide to blackmail Channel.

Sukie has also been en route to Tallahassee in her capacity as a police officer after Jamie tipped her off. Jamie and Marian meet Channel at a lesbian bar and give him the dildo in exchange for one million dollars. Sukie intercepts them as they exit, and Channel, misinterpreting the interaction, turns back around to try to kill the women. Sukie shoots him. Channel survives, but his reputation is ruined when newspapers begin publishing articles about his criminal connections and the dildo collection.

The next day, Jamie and Marian meet with Marian's aunt at their hotel. Jamie casually mentions that she and Marian plan to go to Massachusetts, as same-sex marriage is legal there. As the trio drives away, a bellhop races to give them a bag that they have left behind, which contains two plaster casts Jamie had made of the dildo modeled after Channel's penis.

== Cast ==
- Margaret Qualley as Jamie
- Geraldine Viswanathan as Marian
  - Samsara Leela Vett as young Marian
- Beanie Feldstein as Sukie
- Colman Domingo as Chief
- Pedro Pascal as Santos
- Bill Camp as Curlie
- Joey Slotnick as Arliss
- C. J. Wilson as Flint
- Annie Gonzalez as Carla
- Josh Flitter as the bellboy
- Matt Damon as Gary Channel
  - Jordan Zatawski as young Gary Channel
- Miley Cyrus as Tiffany Plastercaster (uncredited)

== Production ==
=== Development and casting ===
Ethan Coen and his wife, Tricia Cooke, first pitched the idea for the film to their friend Allison Anders during a Christmas vacation in San Francisco in the early 2000s. The film was announced in January 2007 under the title Drive-Away Dykes, with Anders attached to direct. Selma Blair, Holly Hunter, Christina Applegate, and Chloë Sevigny were among those attached to star at various points during pre-production. In April 2022, reports said Coen would be directing the film, which was now being described as an untitled "lesbian road trip project". It was produced by Coen, Cooke, Robert Graf, and Working Title principals Tim Bevan and Eric Fellner. In August 2022, Margaret Qualley and Geraldine Viswanathan joined the cast. In September, Beanie Feldstein was added to the cast. In April 2023, the title was revealed to be Drive-Away Dolls, with Pedro Pascal, Colman Domingo, Bill Camp and Matt Damon added to the cast. The film had a negative pickup cost of $20 million.

Drive-Away Dolls is the debut of Coen as a solo director (excluding the 2022 documentary Jerry Lee Lewis: Trouble in Mind), without the collaboration of his brother, Joel. It is also his first narrative film since The Ballad of Buster Scruggs (2018). Coen took a break from film-making in 2018 because he had grown bored with the process of creating a film. He explained this decision to the Associated Press by saying:

After 30 years, not that it's no fun, but it's more of a job than it had been. Joel kind of felt the same way but not to the extent that I did. It's an inevitable by-product of aging. And the last two movies we made, me and Joel together, were really difficult in terms of production. I mean, really difficult. So if you don't have to do it, you go at a certain point: Why am I doing this?

Coen and Cooke decided to make Drive-Away Dolls because the COVID-19 pandemic gave them the time to work on it. Coen has described Cooke as "in every way except name the co-director of the movie". He has stated that the only reason why Cooke is not credited as a co-director is because she is not a member of the Directors Guild of America.

Since the project's initial announcement, Coen has described the tone of Drive-Away Dolls as being similar to the early 1970s exploitation romance films he saw as a teenager. Cooke has cited Faster, Pussycat! Kill! Kill!, Bad Girls Go to Hell, Alice Doesn't Live Here Anymore, Go Fish, But I'm a Cheerleader, and the works of John Waters as reference points for the film.

Tiffany Plastercaster, Miley Cyrus's character, was based on the real-life artist Cynthia Plaster Caster.

=== Filming ===
Principal photography began by August 2022 in Pittsburgh, with Ari Wegner serving as cinematographer. Production took place in Hopewell Township, Beaver County, Pennsylvania, and in Lawrence, Washington County, Pennsylvania, in October 2022.

== Release ==
Drive-Away Dolls was originally scheduled to be released on September 22, 2023, but was delayed due to the 2023 SAG-AFTRA strike.

The film was released in Australia on February 22, 2024, followed by a release in the United States by Focus Features the next day. It was released in the United Kingdom on March 15, 2024.

== Reception ==
=== Box office ===
In the United States and Canada, Drive-Away Dolls was released alongside Demon Slayer: Kimetsu no Yaiba – To the Hashira Training and Ordinary Angels, and was projected to gross around $4 million from 2,261 theaters in its opening weekend. It ended up debuting to $2.4 million, finishing in eighth.

=== Critical response ===
On the review aggregator website Rotten Tomatoes, 64% of 253 critics' reviews are positive, with an average rating of 6.1/10. The website's consensus reads: "The appealing odd-couple chemistry between Margaret Qualley and Geraldine Viswanathan helps Drive-Away Dolls power past its overly familiar screenplay and erratic execution." Metacritic, which uses a weighted average, assigned the film a score of 56 out of 100, based on 50 critics, indicating "mixed or average" reviews. Audiences surveyed by CinemaScore gave the film an average grade of "C" on an A+ to F scale, while those polled by PostTrak gave it a 66% overall positive score.

In a negative review, Barry Hertz of The Globe and Mail wrote, "There is a fine line between endearing, breezy silliness and second-hand embarrassment, a border that the undercooked film crosses back and forth over and over again until there's no space left for your eyes to roll."

Tomris Laffly of RogerEbert.com gave the film three and a half out of four stars and wrote, "Sometimes, there is the slightest air of obviousness in Drive-Away Dolls, which can't avoid inevitable comparisons to older (and better) idiosyncratic crime capers, many of them by the Coens themselves. But that doesn't lessen the nostalgic bliss the film stirs in one with all its foul-mouthed, naughty glory; not when the fun had by everyone involved in the project is so palpable on the screen. In that, there is a disarming what the hell, why not quality to Cooke and Coen's writing, with the carefree words and actions of Jamie and Marian jovially bouncing off the page and landing on the viewers' eyes and ears with the same jubilant vigor."
