= Honey Don't! =

2025 American film by Ethan Coen

- Theatrical release poster
- Directed by: Ethan Coen
- Written by: Ethan Coen; Tricia Cooke
- Produced by: Robert Graf; Ethan Coen; Tricia Cooke; Tim Bevan; Eric Fellner
- Starring: Margaret Qualley; Aubrey Plaza; Charlie Day; Chris Evans
- Cinematography: Ari Wegner
- Edited by: Tricia Cooke; Emily Denker
- Music by: Carter Burwell
- Production companies: Focus Features; Working Title Films
- Distributed by: Focus Features (United States); Universal Pictures (International)
- Release dates: May 24, 2025 (Cannes); August 22, 2025 (United States)
- Running time: 89 minutes
- Countries: United Kingdom; United States
- Language: English
- Box office: $7.4 million

Honey Don't! is a 2025 neo-noir black comedy film directed by Ethan Coen, who co-wrote the screenplay with his wife Tricia Cooke. The second in a "lesbian B-movie trilogy" following Coen and Cooke's Drive-Away Dolls (2024), the plot follows small-town private investigator Honey O'Donahue, who delves into a series of strange deaths tied to a mysterious church. The film stars Margaret Qualley, Aubrey Plaza, Charlie Day, and Chris Evans.

Its world premiere was at the Midnight Screenings section of the 2025 Cannes Film Festival on May 24, 2025. It was theatrically released in the United States and Canada by Focus Features on August 22, 2025. It received mixed reviews from critics.

== Plot ==
In Bakersfield, California, private investigator Honey O'Donahue learns that Mia Novotny has been found dead in a wrecked car in Antelope Canyon. Mia had phoned Honey, afraid and unable to go to the police, and they were to meet the next day. Mia was stabbed and placed in the car before it crashed. Marty Metakawich, a homicide detective, is at the scene. He asks Honey for a date and thinks she is joking when she says she likes girls.

Mia's mother has no idea why her daughter phoned Honey. In Mia's bedroom, Honey finds self-help books and a church robe, which Honey's assistant, Spider, traces to the Four-Way Temple. The leader of the temple, Reverend Drew Devlin, preaches Four Ways: action, duty, passion, and submission. He has "fellowship" with young female congregants in bed, and runs a murderous narcotrafficking operation. His suppliers are "the French" and his liaison is Chère. She removed Mia's Temple ring before police arrived, and warns Drew that her people are not happy.

Honey phones MG, a policewoman she met at the station, and after a charged encounter in a bar, they have sex at Honey's apartment. Honey's teenage niece Corinne shows up, having been assaulted by her boyfriend Mickie. Honey agrees not to tell Corinne's mother—Heidi, Honey's sister—if Corinne stops seeing Mickie, and MG agrees not to report it.

At a bus stop after her shift at Wiener Heaven, Corinne runs away from an old man who says he loves her. When she does not come home, Heidi phones Honey for help. Checking if Corinne is back with Mickie, Honey brutally questions him, but he has not seen her.

Honey is approached by the old man—her and Heidi's estranged father, who wants to reconnect. He tells Honey about seeing Corinne at the bus stop. Honey drives around town looking for her, fearing that she is in danger of following Mia's path.

After sex with Reverend Drew, Chère reiterates the French are not happy and shoots him. Honey has just driven up to the church when she hears the gunshot, but finds the door locked. She wants Marty to search the church, but he is skeptical that it was gunfire she heard. Hoping that MG can help, Honey discovers that she booked off work and is not answering her phone, so calls on her at home.

After an awkward conversation, Honey notices a teacup bearing Corinne's green lipstick. Corinne is captive in the basement and MG intends to kill her, as she did Mia. Honey is stabbed by MG but disarms her with the boiling kettle and shoots her before passing out.

Honey awakens in an ambulance with Corinne and Heidi, who was given MG's address by Spider. Marty believes that in addition to Mia, MG murdered at least two sex workers and her own father. He compliments Honey on her marksmanship and asks her out, to which she replies, as always, "I like girls."

Noticing each other at a stoplight, Honey and Chère flirt.

== Cast ==
- Margaret Qualley as Honey O'Donahue, private investigator
- Aubrey Plaza as MG Falcone, police officer
- Chris Evans as Reverend Drew Devlin, a cult leader
- Charlie Day as Marty Metakawich, police detective
- Billy Eichner as Mr. Siegfried, one of Honey's clients
- Lera Abova as Chère, Rev. Drew's liaison
- Talia Ryder as Corinne, Honey's niece
- Kristen Connolly as Heidi O'Donahue, Honey's older sister
- Gabby Beans as Spider, Honey's assistant
- Josh Pafchek as Shuggie, Rev. Drew's assistant
- Jacnier as Hector Bonner, Rev. Drew's drug dealer
- Kale Browne as Honey and Heidi's estranged father
- Christian Antidormi as Colligan, Mr. Siegfried's boyfriend
- Lena Hall as Elle, a woman who plays piano at a bar
- Don Swayze as Gary
- Alexander Carstoiu as Mickie, Corinne's deadbeat boyfriend
- Kinna McInroe as Mrs. Novotny, Mia's mother
- Sean Dillingham as Ray Novotny, Mia's father
- Kara Petersen as Mia Novotny, a murder victim

== Production ==
In January 2024, it was announced that Margaret Qualley, Aubrey Plaza, and Chris Evans were set to star in the film. The screenplay was written by married couple Ethan Coen and Tricia Cooke, as the second in a "lesbian B-movie trilogy", following 2024's Drive-Away Dolls, which also starred Qualley and was also a lesbian-themed caper film, and coming before a planned third film titled Go Beavers. The duo characterized the film as a dark comedy similar in tone to earlier Coen brothers works, such as Raising Arizona, but with sexual content the brothers did not typically include in their collaborations. The release of this trilogy is the outcome of 20 years of writing by Coen and Cooke. It was produced by Focus Features and Working Title Films.

In April 2024, Charlie Day, Billy Eichner, Gabby Beans, Talia Ryder, Lera Abova, Jacnier, Kristen Connolly, Lena Hall, Don Swayze, Josh Pafchek, Kale Browne, Alexander Carstoiu, and Christian Antidormi joined the cast.

Principal photography began in Albuquerque, New Mexico on March 25, 2024 and wrapped on May 23.

== Release ==
Honey Don't! was selected to be screened out of competition in the Midnight Screenings section at the 78th Cannes Film Festival, where it had its world premiere on May 24, 2025, receiving a standing ovation.

The film was released in the United States by Focus Features on August 22, 2025, and internationally by Universal Pictures.

== Reception ==
On the review aggregator website Rotten Tomatoes, 45% of 178 critics' reviews are positive, with an average rating of 5.1/10. The website's consensus reads: "Disparate parts and desperate measures spell defeat for Ethan Coen this time around in a romp that tries to cast a wide net but will ultimately leave audiences saying, Honey Don't." Metacritic, which uses a weighted average, assigned the film a score of 46 out of 100, based on 38 critics, indicating "mixed or average" reviews.

The Hollywood Reporter lauded the performances and some elements of the film's "world-building" as well as the "gallery of strong supporting characters," but concluded it all felt like a "series of gags with nowhere to go." IndieWire, on the other hand, assessed the film as "a mishmash of disparate parts," further opining that "[w]hereas Drive-Away Dolls was psychedelically silly — allowing it to get away with more of its slipshod plotting — Honey Don't! aims for a spin on noir but has zero interest in actually developing a compelling mystery." The Wrap expressed the view that Coen's previous movie was more engaging, while Honey is essentially "empty at its core." Valnet's Collider review found Margaret Qualley's performance to be "a gem" and the film embracing a certain modern "Wild, Wild West vibe" with moments of laugh-out-loud, slapstick humor. It concludes that plot holes might make Honey hardly a perfect film, but for people who like film noir this might be another "slam dunk." Sean Burns of WBUR wrote, "This weirdly inert neo-noir just lies there on the screen, baking in the California desert sun."

Variety opined that it is a deliberate throwaway, a mock escapist thriller, one meant to show audience a "flaky good time," while Vulture appreciated the sexual swagger of the plot and the women's performances in a film that could have been better.
