= The Hudsucker Proxy =

1994 US comedy film by the Coen brothers

- Theatrical release poster
- Directed by: Joel Coen (Note: Although the Coen brothers co-directed this film, Joel received sole credit due to Directors Guild of America regulations)
- Written by: Ethan Coen; Joel Coen; Sam Raimi
- Produced by: Ethan Coen (Note: Although the Coen brothers both produced this film, Ethan received sole credit due to Directors Guild of America regulations)
- Starring: Tim Robbins; Jennifer Jason Leigh; Paul Newman
- Cinematography: Roger Deakins
- Edited by: Thom Noble
- Music by: Carter Burwell
- Production companies: Silver Pictures; Working Title Films; PolyGram Filmed Entertainment
- Distributed by: Warner Bros. (United States); Rank Film Distributors (United Kingdom)
- Release dates: January 27, 1994 (Sundance); March 11, 1994 (United States); September 2, 1994 (United Kingdom)
- Running time: 111 minutes
- Countries: United Kingdom; United States
- Language: English
- Budget: $25 million
- Box office: $11 million

The Hudsucker Proxy is a 1994 screwball comedy film co-written, produced, and directed by Joel and Ethan Coen. Sam Raimi co-wrote the script and served as second unit director. The film stars Tim Robbins as a naïve but ambitious business school graduate who is installed as president of a manufacturing company, Jennifer Jason Leigh as a newspaper reporter, and Paul Newman as a company director who hires the graduate as part of a stock scam.

The script was finished in 1985, but production did not start until 1991, when Joel Silver acquired the script for Silver Pictures. Warner Bros. Pictures subsequently agreed to distribute the film, with further financing from PolyGram Filmed Entertainment and Working Title Films. Filming at Carolco Studios in Wilmington, North Carolina, lasted from November 1992 to March 1993. The New York City scale model set was designed by Michael J. McAlister and Mark Stetson, with further effects provided by The Computer Film Company.

Upon its release in March 1994, The Hudsucker Proxy received mixed reviews from critics and bombed at the box office, but has since gained a cult following.

== Plot ==
In December 1958, Norville Barnes, a business college graduate from Muncie, Indiana, arrives in New York City, looking for a job. He struggles due to lack of experience and becomes a mailroom clerk at Hudsucker Industries, a large corporation. Soon thereafter, the company's founder and president, Waring Hudsucker, unexpectedly commits suicide during a business meeting by jumping out of a top-floor window.

Afterward, Sidney J. Mussburger, a ruthless member of the company's board of directors, knowing that Hudsucker Industries' bylaws call for Hudsucker's stock shares to be sold to the public, suggests a scheme to buy the controlling interest in the company by temporarily depressing the stock price by hiring a clearly incompetent president to run the business.

In the mailroom, Norville is assigned to deliver a "Blue Letter" to Mussburger. The letter is a top-secret communication from Hudsucker, sent shortly before his death. However, Norville does not deliver the letter; instead, he pitches Mussburger an invention of his (indicated with no other explanation than a simple drawing of a circle and his cryptic explanation, "you know: for kids"). Believing Norville to be an idiot, Mussburger selects him as a proxy for Hudsucker.

Across town, Amy Archer, a brassy Pulitzer Prize–winning reporter for the Manhattan Argus newspaper, is assigned to write a story about Norville and find out what kind of man he really is. She obtains a job at Hudsucker Industries as his personal secretary, pretending to be yet another desperate graduate from his alma mater in Muncie.

One night, Amy searches the building for clues and meets Moses, who operates the tower's giant clock and knows "just about anything if it concerns Hudsucker". He tells her Mussburger's plot, and she takes the story back to her Chief, but he does not believe it.

The other executives at Hudsucker Industries decide to produce Norville's invention in hopes that it will flop and further depress the company's stock. However, the invention is the hula-hoop, which initially fails in obscurity but then becomes an enormous success.

Norville allows success to go to his head and becomes yet another uncaring tycoon. Amy, who had fallen for his naive charm, is infuriated over Norville's new attitude and leaves him. Buzz, the eager elevator operator, pitches a new invention: the bendy straw, which Buzz calls the "Buzz-sucker". Norville insults the idea and cruelly fires Buzz, ignoring his pleas that he needs the job.

Meanwhile, Aloysius, a Hudsucker janitor, discovers Amy's true identity and informs Mussburger. Mussburger reveals Amy's secret identity to Norville and tells him he will be dismissed as president after the new year. Mussburger also convinces the board that Norville is insane and must be sent to the local psychiatric hospital.

On New Year's Eve, Amy finds Norville drunk at a beatnik bar. She apologizes, but he storms out and is chased by an angry mob led by Buzz. Norville escapes to the top floor of the Hudsucker skyscraper and changes back into his mailroom uniform. He climbs out on the ledge, where Aloysius locks him out and watches as he slips and falls off the building at the stroke of midnight.

While Norville plummets, Moses stops the building's giant clock, which freezes time. Waring Hudsucker appears to Norville as an angel and tells him to read the Blue Letter (still in Norville's uniform pocket) that was supposed to be delivered to Mussburger: it contains Hudsucker's instructions to transfer his shares to his immediate successor as president, rather than to the public. This would have been Mussburger, but, unaware of this, he proceeded with his scheme to elect Norville.

Inside the building's giant clock, Moses fights Aloysius, defeating him. Norville descends safely to the ground. He and Amy reconcile. As 1959 progresses, Mussburger, after learning about Hudsucker's instructions, attempts suicide and is sent to an asylum, while Norville develops a new invention for kids: another enigmatic circle that ultimately turns out to be a frisbee.

== Cast ==
- Tim Robbins as Norville Barnes
- Jennifer Jason Leigh as Amy Archer
- Paul Newman as Sidney J. Mussburger
- Jim True as Clarence "Buzz" Gunderson, the elevator operator
- Bill Cobbs as Moses, the clock man
- Harry Bugin as Aloysius, the janitor
- Bruce Campbell as Smitty, Argus reporter
- John Mahoney as Al, the Argus chief editor
- Charles Durning as Waring Hudsucker
- Patrick Cranshaw as Ancient Sorter
- Anna Nicole Smith as Za-Za
- Steve Buscemi as Danny the Bartender
- Sam Raimi as Hudsucker Brainstormer
- Jon Polito as Mr. Bumstead
- Peter Gallagher as Vic Tenetta
- Mike Starr as Newsroom Reporter
- Roy Brocksmith as board member
- John Goodman (credited as Karl Mundt) as Rockwell newsreel announcer

== Development ==
=== Writing ===
The Coen brothers first met Sam Raimi when Joel Coen worked as an assistant editor on Raimi's The Evil Dead (1981). Together, they began writing the script for The Hudsucker Proxy in 1981, and continued during the filming of Crimewave (1985), and post-production on Blood Simple (1984), during which Joel and Ethan Coen shared a house with Raimi. The Coens and Raimi were inspired by the films of Preston Sturges, such as Christmas in July (1940) and the Hollywood satire Sullivan's Travels (1941). The sentimental tone and decency of ordinary men as heroes was influenced by films of Frank Capra, like Mr. Deeds Goes to Town (1936), Meet John Doe (1941), and It's a Wonderful Life (1946). The dialogue is an homage to Howard Hawks' His Girl Friday (1940), while Jennifer Jason Leigh's performance as fast-talking reporter Amy Archer is reminiscent of Rosalind Russell and Katharine Hepburn, in both the physical and vocal mannerisms. Other movies that observers found references to include Executive Suite (1954) and Sweet Smell of Success (1957). The brothers had no intention of commenting on or parodying such movies. Instead, as Ethan said, "It's the case where, having seen those movies, we say 'They're really fun – let's do one'; as opposed to 'They're really fun- let's comment upon them.'" Raimi describes the script as "big-business comedy. It's a return to the very large love story comedies they used to make in the forties and early fifties." So the brothers started to pace around their apartment, taking turns on the typewriter, and when they found themselves stuck at a point, Raimi would do all sorts of tricks to get the boys back up. For example, while Ethan is pacing around, he would move things around the apartment so Ethan would be thrown off, he even said he threw firecrackers at them.

One film critic described the numerous influences: "From his infelicitous name to his physical clumsiness, Norville Barnes is a Preston Sturges hero trapped in a Frank Capra story, and never should that twain meet, especially not in a world that seems to have been created by Fritz Lang – the mechanistic monstrousness of the mailroom contrasted with the Bauhaus gigantism of the corporate offices perfectly matches the boss-labour split in Metropolis (1927)." An interviewer proposed that the characters represent capitalism versus labour economics. Joel Coen replied: "Maybe the characters do embody those grand themes you mentioned, but that question is independent of whether or not we're interested in them – and we're not." The Hudsucker Proxy presents various narrative motifs pertaining to the Rota Fortunae and visual motifs concerning the shape of circles. This includes Moses' monologue at the beginning, the Hudsucker Clock, Mussburger's wristwatch, the inventions of both the hula hoop and frisbee, as well as Norville and Amy's conversation about Karma.

The first image the Coens and Raimi conceived was of Norville Barnes about to jump from the window of a skyscraper and then they had to figure out how he got there and how to save him. The inclusion of the hula hoop came as a result of a plot device. Joel remembers, "We had to come up with something that Norville was going to invent that on the face of it was ridiculous. Something that would seem, by any sort of rational measure, to be doomed to failure, but something that on the other hand the audience already knew was going to be a phenomenal success." Ethan said, "The whole circle motif was built into the design of the movie, and that just made it seem more appropriate." Joel: "What grew out of that was the design element which drives the movie. The tension between vertical lines and circles; you have these tall buildings, then these circles everywhere which are echoed in the plot...in the structure of the movie itself. It starts with the end and circles back to the beginning, with a big flashback." It took the Coens and Raimi three months to write the screenplay. As early as 1985, the Coens were quoted as saying that an upcoming project "takes place in the late Fifties in a skyscraper and is about Big Business. The characters talk fast and wear sharp clothes."

Despite having finished the script in 1985, Joel explained, "We couldn't make Hudsucker back then because we weren't that popular yet. Plus, the script was too expensive and we had just completed Blood Simple, which was an independent film." After completing Barton Fink (1991), the Coens were looking forward to doing a more mainstream film. The Hudsucker Proxy was revived and the Coens and Raimi performed a brief rewrite. Producer Joel Silver, a fan of the Coens' previous films, acquired the script for his production company, Silver Pictures, and pitched the project at Warner Bros. Pictures. Silver also allowed the Coens complete artistic control.

=== Production ===
This was the first time the Coen brothers chose big stars to act in one of their films. Joel Silver's first choice for Norville Barnes was Tom Cruise, but the Coens persisted in a desire to cast Tim Robbins. Jon Cryer auditioned for the lead role of Norville Barnes. Winona Ryder and Bridget Fonda were in competition for the role of Amy Archer, before Jennifer Jason Leigh was cast. Leigh had previously auditioned for a role in the Coens's Miller's Crossing and Barton Fink; her failed auditions prompted the Coens to cast her in The Hudsucker Proxy. To prepare for her role as Amy Archer, Leigh read the biographies of some of the most substantial ladies of the thirties and forties such as Rosalind Russell, Katharine Hepburn, and Jean Arthur. When casting the role of Sidney Mussburger, "Warner Bros. suggested all sorts of names," remembered Joel. "A lot of them were comedians who were clearly wrong. Mussburger is the bad guy and Paul Newman brought that character to life." However, the Coens first offered the role to Clint Eastwood, but he was forced to turn it down due to scheduling conflicts. The Coens also offered their longtime friend Bruce Campbell an audition, but he initially refused, writing that "My history with the Coens spanned more than a decade...I would gladly and willingly accept the role, but these fellows knew my work well enough to spare me the audition." The Coens agreed and Campbell was offered, sans audition, the role of Smitty. Campbell was later effusive in his praise for the professionalism of the production and the other cast members, as well as being in awe that he was chosen to help Paul Newman rehearse before filming began.

Once Newman and Robbins signed on, PolyGram Filmed Entertainment and Working Title Films agreed to co-finance the film with Warner Bros. and Silver Pictures. The film was shot on five sound stages at Carolco Studios in Wilmington, North Carolina, beginning on November 30, 1992. Raimi served as second unit director, shooting the hula hoop sequence and Waring Hudsucker's suicide. Production designer Dennis Gassner was influenced by fascist architecture, particularly the work of Albert Speer, as well as Terry Gilliam's Brazil (1985), Frank Lloyd Wright and the Art Deco movement. Gassner contemplated using five huge rooms needed to accommodate the sound stages. Gassner noted "You see, we wanted things to be big." He said that the huge 1950s-inspired table up in the boardroom was so long, it had to be built in five sections and later on assembled on the soundstage. The intention for the set sizes was to generate an oppressive feel. Principal photography ended on March 18, 1993.

In addition, numerous sequences were filmed in downtown Chicago, particularly in the Merchandise Mart building for the entrance and lobby to Hudsucker Industries and The Blackstone Hotel Christmas ballroom.

The presses in the News & Observer building in downtown Raleigh, North Carolina, appeared in the movie.

=== Visual effects ===
The visual effects supervisor was Michael J. McAlister (Indiana Jones and the Last Crusade, Willow) with Mark Stetson (Superman Returns, Peter Pan) as miniatures supervisor. Peter Chesney, mechanical effects designer on many Coen brothers films, created a pair of 16-foot angel wings for actor Charles Durning, who portrayed Waring Hudsucker. "I made a complicated steel armature with a lot of electric motors to time everything so he can fold up his wings, unfold them and flap them about. Then we covered them with real duck and turkey feathers," says Chesney. "We modeled them after photographs of a hovering dove landing in slow motion." The buildings in the background (designed by McAlister and Stetson) were 1:24 scale models, shot separately and merged in post-production. To lengthen the sequence, the model of the Hudsucker building was the equivalent of 90 stories, not 45.

Despite the New York City setting, additional skyscrapers in Chicago, Illinois, provided inspiration for the opening sequence of the skyline, such as the Merchandise Mart and Aon Center. Skyscrapers from New York City included the Chanin Building, the Fred F. French Building and One Wall Street, Manhattan. "We took all our favorite buildings in New York from where they actually stood and sort of put them into one neighborhood," Gassner continued, "a fantasy vision which adds to the atmosphere and flavor." First of all, a model had to be created based on the fantasy 1950s New York for the opening shot. So a miniature city was created, as McAlister mentioned that the Coens did not want a realistic reproduction of 1950s New York skyline, instead they wanted a more stylized version of it. So Gassner used the book New York in The Forties as a reference to create the look for the cityscape. It took three months and 27 crew members to create the miniature city at the scale of 24:1. As for the Hudsucker building, they made it at the scale of 6:1 for closer shots including the long-zoom in of Norville at the beginning. For that scene to be created, it started off with a wide-angle shot, moving closer towards Tim Robbins, who was standing in a full sized set, which they inserted inside the shot of the model clock. "Marrying a live-action image with a painted or miniature element was, of course, nothing new, however, in the case of the zoom-in on Robbins from such a distance, keeping the full-size set locked in with the model building, that was state-of-the-art and the only way to do it was with computers," says McAlister. Most of the buildings were created with two sides only, as they are seen from only the front and the side, and some needed only one side, as they were seen from only the front, while the Hudsucker building was made completely three-dimensional. The work of The Computer Film Company (supervised by Janek Sirrs) included manipulations of the zoom-in shot of Norville at the beginning, as well as CGI snow and composites of the falling sequences.

To create the two suicide falls, the miniature New York set was hung sideways to allow full movement along the heights of the buildings. McAlister calculated that such a drop would take seven seconds, but for dramatic purposes it was extended to around thirty. Problems occurred when the Coens and cinematographer Roger Deakins decided that these shots would be more effective with a wide-angle lens. "The buildings had been designed for an 18 mm lens, but as we tried a 14 mm lens, and then a 10 mm, we liked the shots more and more." However, the wider amount of vision meant that the edges of the frame went beyond the fringes of the model city, leaving empty spaces with no buildings. In the end, extra buildings were created from putting the one-sided buildings together and placing them at the edges. Charles Durning's fall was shot conventionally, but because Tim Robbins had to stop abruptly at the camera, his was shot in reverse as he was pulled away from the camera.

The skyscraper models created for The Hudsucker Proxy were re-used for The Shadow, Batman Forever, Batman & Robin, and Godzilla.

== Soundtrack ==
Original Motion Picture Soundtrack: The Hudsucker Proxy

Soundtrack album by Carter Burwell
- Released: March 15, 1994
- Genre: Film score
- Length: 29:28
- Label: Varèse Sarabande

Professional ratings
Review scores
Source	Rating
AllMusic	link

The score to The Hudsucker Proxy was written by Carter Burwell, the fifth of his collaborations with the Coen Brothers. "Adagio of Spartacus and Phrygia" from Aram Khachaturian's ballet Spartacus is the basis of the main theme and additional music from the ballet runs under the Hula-Hoop sequence. The popular music of the time is also reflected in the character of Vic Tenetta (Peter Gallagher), modeled after Dean Martin, who sings "Memories Are Made of This." Additional inspiration comes from Khachaturian's Gayane suite. A section from the ballet is used by Burwell for the scene in which Norville and Amy meet for the first time. Later, in a montage of the introduction of the hula hoop, Burwell's adaptation of Khachaturian's "Dance of the Young Kurds" (from Gayane) is used when sales of the hula hoop are initially slow and when a young boy is the first to try the hula hoop, followed by Burwell's adaptation of Khachaturian's "Sabre Dance" (also from Gayane) when the children get excited and rush to the store, rapidly increasing the sales of the hula hoop.

== Release ==
=== Commercial reception ===
Warner Bros. Pictures held test screenings and audience comments were largely mixed. The studio suggested re-shoots, but the Coens, who held final cut privilege, refused because they were very nervous working with their biggest budget to date and were eager for mainstream success. The producers eventually added footage that had been cut and also shot minor pick-ups for the ending. Variety claimed that the pick-ups were done to try to save the film because Warner feared it was going to be a box office bomb. Joel Coen addressed the issue in an interview: "First of all, they weren't reshoots. They were a little bit of additional footage. We wanted to shoot a fight scene at the end of the movie. It was the product of something we discovered editing the movie, not previewing it. We've done additional shooting on every movie, so it's normal."

The film premiered in January 1994 at the Sundance Film Festival in Park City, Utah. In addition, The Hudsucker Proxy opened the 1994 Cannes Film Festival on May 12, 1994. The film was in competition for the Palme d'Or, but lost to Pulp Fiction. The Hudsucker Proxy was released on March 11, 1994, and only grossed $2,816,518 in the United States and Canada. Worldwide, it grossed $11.3 million. The production budget was officially set at $25 million, although, it was reported to have increased to $40 million for marketing and promotion purposes. The film was a box office bomb.

=== Critical response ===
In addition to the film under-performing at the box office, The Hudsucker Proxy opened to mixed reviews from critics. On Rotten Tomatoes 61% of reviews from 56 critics are positive. The site's consensus states, "Intriguingly strange and visually distinctive, The Hudsucker Proxy is ultimately almost – but not quite – as smart and absorbing as it needs to be." On Metacritic, the film has a weighted average score of 53 out of 100 based on 19 critics, which the site labels as "mixed or average" reviews. Audiences polled by CinemaScore gave the film a grade B on scale of A to F.

Roger Ebert praised the production design, scale model work, matte paintings, cinematography, and characters. "But the problem with the movie is that it's all surface and no substance," Ebert wrote. "Not even the slightest attempt is made to suggest that the film takes its own story seriously. Everything is style. The performances seem deliberately angled as satire." Desson Thomson of The Washington Post described The Hudsucker Proxy as being "pointlessly flashy and compulsively overloaded with references to films of the 1930s. Missing in this film's performances is a sense of humanity, the crucial ingredient in the movies Hudsucker is clearly trying to evoke. Hudsucker isn't the real thing at all. It's just a proxy." John Simon of National Review described The Hudsucker Proxy as "asinine and insufferable".

Todd McCarthy, writing in Variety, called the film "one of the most inspired and technically stunning pastiches of old Hollywood pictures ever to come out of the New Hollywood. But a pastiche it remains, as nearly everything in the Coen brothers' latest and biggest film seems like a wizardly but artificial synthesis, leaving a hole in the middle where some emotion and humanity should be." James Berardinelli gave a largely positive review. "The Hudsucker Proxy skewers Big Business on the same shaft that Robert Altman ran Hollywood through with The Player. From the Brazil-like scenes in the cavernous mail room to the convoluted machinations in the board room, this film is pure satire of the nastiest and most enjoyable sort. In this surreal world of 1958 can be found many of the issues confronting large corporations in the 1990s, all twisted to match the filmmakers' vision."

Two decades after the film's release, Scout Tafoya of RogerEbert.com praised the film for its stylistic adventurousness and expansion upon the themes and concepts of the films that inspired it. "Whereas the comedies of the 1930s and '40s could talk quickly and move quickly, they couldn't run at a full gallop like the Coen Brothers. Their camera soars, traveling at the speed of progress, gossip, capitalism itself. Everything races at top speed. The production design, the one thing everyone felt comfortable praising, is a marvel. Every frame doubles as a survey of early modern art, from Art Deco to Futurism."

=== Home media ===
Warner Home Video released The Hudsucker Proxy on DVD on May 18, 1999. No featurettes were included. It was one of the first Blu-ray Disc titles released through the Warner Archive Collection on February 26, 2013, but it still lacked any featurettes.

=== Year-end lists ===
- 8th – Stephen Hunter, The Baltimore Sun
- 8th – Sandi Davis, The Oklahoman
- 9th – Sean P. Means, The Salt Lake Tribune
- Top 10 (listed alphabetically, not ranked) – William Arnold, Seattle Post-Intelligencer
- Honorable mention – Mike Clark, USA Today
- Biggest disappointment – Glenn Lovell, San Jose Mercury News

== See also ==
- List of films set around New Year

== Bibliography ==
- Bergan, Ronald (2000). The Coen Brothers. New York City: Thunder's Mouth Press. ISBN 1-56025-254-5.
- Levine, Josh (2000). The Coen Brothers The Story of Two American Filmmakers. Toronto: ECW Press. ISBN 1-55022-424-7.
- Mottram, James (2000). The Coen Brothers The Life of the Mind. Dulles, Virginia: Brassey's, Inc. ISBN 1-57488-273-2.
- Muir, John Kenneth (2004). The Unseen Force The Films of Sam Raimi. New York City: Applause: Theatre & Cinema Books. ISBN 1-55783-607-8.
- Mottram, James (2003). Coen Brothers. London: Virgin Books. ISBN 1-57488-273-2.
- Warren, Bill (2000). The Evil Dead Companion. London: Titan Books. ISBN 0-312-27501-3.
- Woods, Paul A. (2003). Joel & Ethan Coen Blood Siblings. London: Plexus. ISBN 0-85965-339-0.
- Cotta Vaz, Mark; Duignan, Patricia Rose (1996). Industrial Light & Magic: Into the Digital Realm. New York: Del Rey (Ballantine). ISBN 978-0-345-38152-1.
