= Jerry Lee Lewis: Trouble in Mind =

- Theatrical release poster
- Directed by: Ethan Coen
- Produced by: Peter Afterman; T Bone Burnett; Steve Bing; Mick Jagger; Victoria Pearman
- Starring: Jerry Lee Lewis
- Edited by: Tricia Cooke
- Production companies: A24; Live Nation Productions; Jagged Films; Shangri-La Entertainment; Inaudible Films
- Distributed by: A24
- Release dates: May 22, 2022 (Cannes Film Festival); February 14, 2024 (Prime Video)
- Running time: 74 minutes
- Country: United States
- Language: English

Jerry Lee Lewis: Trouble in Mind is a 2022 archival documentary film about American singer-songwriter Jerry Lee Lewis, directed by Ethan Coen and edited by his wife Tricia Cooke. Producers include Mick Jagger and T Bone Burnett.

Coen's first solo directorial work after having written, directed and produced all of this previous films with his brother Joel, it premiered at the 2022 Cannes Film Festival on May 22, 2022, five months before Lewis' death the following October. It received its public release on Prime Video on February 14, 2024.

== Synopsis ==
The documentary combines pre-existing interviews with Lewis at different stages of his life and career with performance footage, and interviews with other people such as Myra Lewis Williams, his ex-wife and cousin, and country singer Mickey Gilley who was also his cousin.

== Production ==
Coen and Cooke were approached by T-Bone Burnett during the COVID-19 pandemic with the idea of making an archival documentary with a process that could be completed at home, which was appealing at a time of widespread isolation and withdrawal from public activities. Coen described the idea as "too compelling to turn down". Cooke described it as "like a home movie project."

== Reception ==
On the review aggregator website Rotten Tomatoes, 74% of 19 critics' reviews are positive, with an average rating of 5.5/10. Metacritic, which uses a weighted average, assigned the film a score of 62 out of 100, based on 10 critics, indicating "generally favorable" reviews.

Peter Bradshaw in The Guardian said it was "thoroughly enjoyable" and that it "does something very few films can: it makes you grin with pleasure." The Hollywood Reporter describes "a video mixtape chock-full of performances showing how even a man who rarely wrote his own songs could earn a place in the rock’n’roll pantheon. And that’s literally all it is.. Coen makes no effort to clear up the mythology [around Lewis]…Trouble in Mind may appeal mainly to roots-rock diehards and Coen Brothers super-completists". Owen Gliebermann in Variety acknowledges Coen "uses almost nothing but old performance and TV-interview clips" but that he "combines them artfully, syncing them to his own pleasure centers—and ours."

== Release ==
The film was shown at the 2022 Cannes Film Festival on May 22, 2022. The film had an official public release on Prime Video in the United States on February 14, 2024.

== See also ==
- Great Balls of Fire! – 1989 biopic about Jerry Lee Lewis
