= Lynn Redgrave Theater =

Off-Broadway theater in New York City

Coordinates: 40.7259°N 73.9942°W

- Interactive map of Lynn Redgrave Theater
- Former names: Bleecker Street Theater; 45 Bleecker Street Theater
- Address: 45 Bleecker Street; New York, New York 10012
- Location: United States
- Type: Off-Broadway

Website
- cultureproject.org

The Lynn Redgrave Theater was an Off-Broadway theater at 45 Bleecker Street in the NoHo neighborhood of Manhattan, New York City, New York, US. It was previously known as the Bleecker Street Theater and 45 Bleecker Street Theater but was renamed in honor of actress Lynn Redgrave in 2013. As of 2023, the building (with an address of 43–49 Bleecker Street) was for sale, with a reported asking amount of $50 million; it was being proposed for residential conversion by 2025.
