= List of awards and nominations received by Roger Deakins =

Roger Deakins awards and nominations
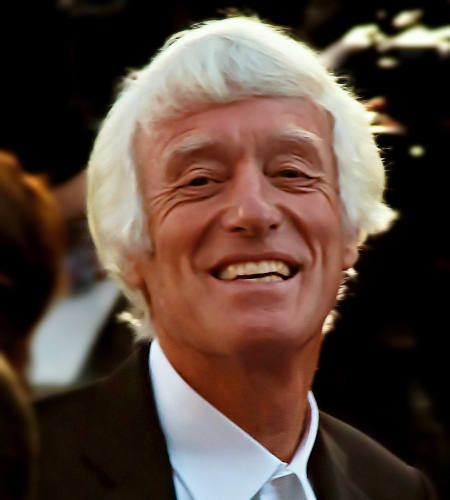
- Deakins at the 83rd Academy Awards
Awards and nominations
Award	Wins	Nominations
Academy Awards	2	16
American Society of Cinematographers	5	16
BAFTA Awards	5	11
Critics' Choice Awards	2	8
Independent Spirit Awards	2	3

Totals (Note: Certain award groups do not simply award one winner. They acknowledge several different recipients, have runners-up, and have third place. Since this is a specific recognition and is different from losing an award, runner-up mentions are considered wins in this award tally. For simplification and to avoid errors, each award in this list has been presumed to have had a prior nomination.)
- Wins: 16
- Nominations: 54

Sir Roger Deakins is an English cinematographer. Over his career he has received several accolades including two Academy Awards, five American Society of Cinematographer Awards, five BAFTA Awards, two Critics' Choice Awards and two Independent Spirit Awards. He also received awards from the National Society of Film Critics, the New York Film Critics Circle and the Los Angeles Film Critics Association.

Deakins has received 16 nominations for the Academy Award for Best Cinematography, winning twice for Denis Villeneuve's science fiction epic Blade Runner 2049 (2017) and the Sam Mendes war film 1917 (2019). He was Oscar-nominated for his work on Villeneuve's Prisoners (2013) and Sicario (2015) as well as Mendes' Skyfall (2012) and Empire of Light (2022). He frequently collaborated with Coen Brothers earning nominations for Fargo (1996), O Brother, Where Art Thou? (2000), The Man Who Wasn't There (2001), No Country for Old Men (2007), and True Grit (2010). He was also nominated for Frank Darabont's The Shawshank Redemption (1994), Martin Scorsese's Kundun (1997), Andrew Dominik's The Assassination of Jesse James by the Coward Robert Ford (2007), Stephen Daldry's The Reader (2008), and Angelina Jolie's Unbroken (2014).

Deakins is the recipient of five BAFTA Awards for Best Cinematography, for The Man Who Wasn't There (2001) in that same year, and for No Country for Old Men (2007), True Grit (2010), Blade Runner 2049 (2017), 1917 (2019), each in the year following their release. As well, two films that he shot, Fargo (1996), and A Serious Man (2009), won Independent Spirit Awards for Best Cinematography.

Deakins was appointed Commander of the Order of the British Empire (CBE) in the 2013 Birthday Honours for services to film. He was knighted in the 2021 New Year Honours, also for services to film. He has been named as an Honorary Fellow of his alma mater, the National Film and Television School in Beaconsfield, Buckinghamshire for his contributions to British cinema in 2020.

== Major associations ==
=== Academy Awards ===
Year	Category	Nominated work	Result	Ref.
1994	Best Cinematography	The Shawshank Redemption	Nominated	
1996	Best Cinematography	Fargo	Nominated	
1997	Best Cinematography	Kundun	Nominated	
2000	Best Cinematography	O Brother, Where Art Thou?	Nominated	
2001	Best Cinematography	The Man Who Wasn't There	Nominated	
2007	Best Cinematography	No Country for Old Men	Nominated	
2007	Best Cinematography	The Assassination of Jesse James by the Coward Robert Ford	Nominated	
2008	Best Cinematography	The Reader	Nominated	
2010	Best Cinematography	True Grit	Nominated	
2012	Best Cinematography	Skyfall	Nominated	
2013	Best Cinematography	Prisoners	Nominated	
2014	Best Cinematography	Unbroken	Nominated	
2015	Best Cinematography	Sicario	Nominated	
2017	Best Cinematography	Blade Runner 2049	Won	
2019	Best Cinematography	1917	Won	
2022	Best Cinematography	Empire of Light	Nominated	

=== BAFTA Awards ===
Year	Category	Nominated work	Result	Ref.
1996	Best Cinematography	Fargo	Nominated	
2000	Best Cinematography	O Brother, Where Art Thou?	Nominated	
2001	Best Cinematography	The Man Who Wasn't There	Won	
2007	Best Cinematography	No Country for Old Men	Won	
2008	Best Cinematography	The Reader	Nominated	
2010	Best Cinematography	True Grit	Won	
2012	Best Cinematography	Skyfall	Nominated	
2015	Best Cinematography	Sicario	Nominated	
2017	Best Cinematography	Blade Runner 2049	Won	
2019	Best Cinematography	1917	Won	
2022	Best Cinematography	Empire of Light	Nominated	

== Miscellaneous awards ==
=== American Society of Cinematographers ===
Year	Category	Nominated work	Result	Ref.
1994	Outstanding Achievement in Cinematography	The Shawshank Redemption	Won	
1996	Outstanding Achievement in Cinematography	Fargo	Nominated	
1997	Outstanding Achievement in Cinematography	Kundun	Nominated	
2000	Outstanding Achievement in Cinematography	O Brother, Where Art Thou?	Nominated	
2001	Outstanding Achievement in Cinematography	The Man Who Wasn't There	Won	
2007	Outstanding Achievement in Cinematography	No Country for Old Men	Nominated	
2007	Outstanding Achievement in Cinematography	The Assassination of Jesse James by the Coward Robert Ford	Nominated	
2008	Outstanding Achievement in Cinematography	Revolutionary Road	Nominated	
2008	Outstanding Achievement in Cinematography	The Reader	Nominated	
2010	Outstanding Achievement in Cinematography	True Grit	Nominated	
2012	Outstanding Achievement in Cinematography	Skyfall	Won	
2013	Outstanding Achievement in Cinematography	Prisoners	Nominated	
2014	Outstanding Achievement in Cinematography	Unbroken	Nominated	
2015	Outstanding Achievement in Cinematography	Sicario	Nominated	
2017	Outstanding Achievement in Cinematography	Blade Runner 2049	Won	
2019	Outstanding Achievement in Cinematography	1917	Won	
2022	Outstanding Achievement in Cinematography	Empire of Light	Nominated	

=== Independent Spirit Awards ===
Year	Category	Nominated work	Result	Ref.
1991	Best Cinematography	Homicide	Nominated	
1996	Best Cinematography	Fargo	Won	
2009	Best Cinematography	A Serious Man	Won	

=== Satellite Awards ===
Year	Category	Nominated work	Result	Ref.
2001	Best Cinematography	The Man Who Wasn't There	Won	
2007	Best Cinematography	The Assassination of Jesse James by the Coward Robert Ford	Nominated	
2009	Best Cinematography	A Serious Man	Nominated	
2012	Best Cinematography	Skyfall	Nominated	
2013	Best Cinematography	Prisoners	Nominated	
2015	Best Cinematography	Sicario	Nominated	
2017	Best Cinematography	Blade Runner 2049	Won	
2019	Best Cinematography	1917	Won	

== Critics awards ==
=== Boston Society of Film Critics ===
Year	Category	Nominated work	Result	Ref.
1997	Best Cinematography	Kundun	Won	
2001	Best Cinematography	The Man Who Wasn't There	Won	
2007	Best Cinematography	The Assassination of Jesse James by the Coward Robert Ford	Nominated	
2009	Best Cinematography	A Serious Man	Nominated	
2010	Best Cinematography	True Grit	Won	
2017	Best Cinematography	Blade Runner 2049	Won	

=== Chicago Film Critics Association ===
Year	Category	Nominated work	Result	Ref.
1991	Best Cinematography	Barton Fink	Won	
1996	Best Cinematography	Fargo	Nominated	
1997	Best Cinematography	Kundun	Nominated	
2000	Best Cinematography	O Brother, Where Art Thou?	Nominated	
2001	Best Cinematography	The Man Who Wasn't There	Nominated	
2007	Best Cinematography	No Country for Old Men	Nominated	
2007	Best Cinematography	The Assassination of Jesse James by the Coward Robert Ford	Won	
2010	Best Cinematography	True Grit	Nominated	
2012	Best Cinematography	Skyfall	Nominated	
2013	Best Cinematography	Prisoners	Nominated	
2015	Best Cinematography	Sicario	Nominated	
2017	Best Cinematography	Blade Runner 2049	Won	
2019	Best Cinematography	1917	Won	

=== Critics' Choice Movie Awards ===
Year	Category	Nominated work	Result	Ref.
2010	Best Cinematography	True Grit	Nominated	
2012	Best Cinematography	Skyfall	Nominated	
2013	Best Cinematography	Prisoners	Nominated	
2014	Best Cinematography	Unbroken	Nominated	
2015	Best Cinematography	Sicario	Nominated	
2017	Best Cinematography	Blade Runner 2049	Won	
2019	Best Cinematography	1917	Won	
2023	Best Cinematography	Empire of Light	Nominated	

=== Dallas–Fort Worth Film Critics Association ===
Year	Category	Nominated work	Result	Ref.
2019	Best Cinematography	1917	Won	

=== Florida Film Critics Circle ===
Year	Category	Nominated work	Result	Ref.
2001	Best Cinematography	The Man Who Wasn't There	Won	
2007	Best Cinematography	No Country for Old Men	Won	
2012	Best Cinematography	Skyfall	Won	
2015	Best Cinematography	Sicario	Nominated	
2017	Best Cinematography	Blade Runner 2049	Won	
2019	Best Cinematography	1917	Won	

=== Houston Film Critics Society ===
Year	Category	Nominated work	Result	Ref.
2007	Best Cinematography	No Country for Old Men	Nominated	
2007	Best Cinematography	The Assassination of Jesse James by the Coward Robert Ford	Won	
2008	Best Cinematography	Revolutionary Road	Nominated	
2010	Best Cinematography	True Grit	Nominated	
2012	Best Cinematography	Skyfall	Won	
2013	Best Cinematography	Prisoners	Nominated	
2014	Best Cinematography	Unbroken	Nominated	
2015	Best Cinematography	Sicario	Nominated	
2017	Best Cinematography	Blade Runner 2049	Won	
2019	Best Cinematography	1917	Won	

=== Los Angeles Film Critics Association ===
Year	Category	Nominated work	Result	Ref.
1991	Best Cinematography	Barton Fink	Won	
1991	Best Cinematography	Homicide	Won	
2001	Best Cinematography	The Man Who Wasn't There	Won	
2010	Best Cinematography	True Grit	Nominated	
2012	Best Cinematography	Skyfall	Won	
2017	Best Cinematography	Blade Runner 2049	Nominated	
2019	Best Cinematography	1917	Nominated	

=== National Society of Film Critics ===
Year	Category	Nominated work	Result	Ref.
1991	Best Cinematography	Barton Fink	Nominated	
1997	Best Cinematography	Kundun	Won	
2001	Best Cinematography	The Man Who Wasn't There	Nominated	
2007	Best Cinematography	No Country for Old Men	Nominated	
2010	Best Cinematography	True Grit	Won	
2012	Best Cinematography	Skyfall	Nominated	
2017	Best Cinematography	Blade Runner 2049	Won	

=== New York Film Critics Circle ===
Year	Category	Nominated work	Result	Ref.
1991	Best Cinematographer	Barton Fink	Won	
1997	Best Cinematographer	Kundun	Won	
2001	Best Cinematographer	The Man Who Wasn't There	Nominated	
2009	Best Cinematographer	A Serious Man	Nominated	

=== Online Film Critics Society ===
Year	Category	Nominated work	Result	Ref.
2000	Best Cinematography	O Brother, Where Art Thou?	Nominated	
2001	Best Cinematography	The Man Who Wasn't There	Won	
2007	Best Cinematography	No Country for Old Men	Won	
2007	Best Cinematography	The Assassination of Jesse James by the Coward Robert Ford	Nominated	
2009	Best Cinematography	A Serious Man	Nominated	
2010	Best Cinematography	True Grit	Won	
2012	Best Cinematography	Skyfall	Won	
2015	Best Cinematography	Sicario	Nominated	
2017	Best Cinematography	Blade Runner 2049	Won	
2019	Best Cinematography	1917	Won	

=== San Diego Film Critics Society ===
Year	Category	Nominated work	Result	Ref.
2001	Best Cinematography	The Man Who Wasn't There	Won	
2007	Best Cinematography	No Country for Old Men	Won	
2013	Best Cinematography	Prisoners	Nominated	
2014	Best Cinematography	Unbroken	Nominated	
2015	Best Cinematography	Sicario	Won	
2017	Best Cinematography	Blade Runner 2049	Nominated	
2019	Best Cinematography	1917	Nominated	

=== St. Louis Film Critics Association ===
Year	Category	Nominated work	Result	Ref.
2007	Best Cinematography	No Country for Old Men	Nominated	
2007	Best Cinematography	The Assassination of Jesse James by the Coward Robert Ford	Won	
2008	Best Cinematography	Revolutionary Road	Nominated	
2012	Best Cinematography	Skyfall	Won	
2014	Best Cinematography	Unbroken	Nominated	
2016	Best Cinematography	Hail, Caesar!	Nominated	
2017	Best Cinematography	Blade Runner 2049	Won	
2019	Best Cinematography	1917	Won	

=== Washington D.C. Area Film Critics Association ===
Year	Category	Nominated work	Result	Ref.
2010	Best Cinematography	True Grit	Nominated	
2012	Best Cinematography	Skyfall	Nominated	
2014	Best Cinematography	Unbroken	Nominated	
2015	Best Cinematography	Sicario	Nominated	
2017	Best Cinematography	Blade Runner 2049	Won	
2019	Best Cinematography	1917	Won	
