= Anthony de Mello (Jesuit priest) =

Indian Jesuit priest and psychotherapist

The Reverend Anthony de Mello SJ
- Born: 4 September 1931; Bombay, British India
- Died: 2 June 1987 (aged 55); New York, New York
- Occupation(s): Jesuit priest, author
- Known for: Spiritual writings and teachings Ignatian spirituality

Anthony de Mello (4 September 1931 – 2 June 1987), also known as Tony de Mello, was an Indian Jesuit priest and psychotherapist. A teacher and public speaker, de Mello wrote several books on spirituality and hosted numerous spiritual retreats and conferences. He is known for his storytelling, which drew from the various mystical traditions of both East and West.

== Life and work ==
De Mello was the oldest of five children born to Frank and Louisa (née Castellino) de Mello. He was born in Bombay, British India, on 4 September 1931. He was raised in a Konkani Goan Catholic family.

At the age of 16 de Mello entered the Society of Jesus seminary of Vinalaya on the outskirts of Bombay. In 1952 he was sent to Spain to study philosophy in Barcelona before undertaking the ministry. He then returned to India to study theology at De Nobili College in Pune and was ordained to the priesthood in March 1961. After his return to India, he spent several years working in seminaries, and in 1968 he was made rector of the seminary of Vinalaya.

De Mello was first attracted to the Jesuits for their strict discipline. Those who knew him during his earlier years in the order said he was somewhat conservative in his theology and reluctant to explore other religions. Some of his peers said that his experience in Spain led him to broaden his perspective and to lose much of his rigidity.

In 1972, he founded the Institute of Pastoral Counselling, later renamed the Sadhana Institute of Pastoral Counselling, in Poona, India. De Mello's first published book, Sadhana – A Way to God, was released in 1978. It outlined a number of spiritual principles and "Christian exercises in Eastern form" inspired by the teachings of Ignatius of Loyola and various Indian and East Asian religious traditions. It popularized various mindfulness and contemplative practices in the West for his readers and for those who attended his lectures.

In the 1980s, De Mello hosted many spiritual retreats in the West and in Latin America, often at Jesuit universities such as Fordham and other Catholic venues. In addition to teaching contemplative practices, these retreats included stories and parables drawn from the mystical traditions of various world religions, including Christian mystics such as John of the Cross, Sufi and Hindu poets such as Rumi and Kabir, stories from Islamic folklore about Nasreddin, stories from the life of the Buddha, and discussion of mindfulness or "awareness" principles, some of which he learned on retreat with S. N. Goenka. Many of these retreat talks were later published as books, during de Mello's life and posthumously.

De Mello died of a heart attack in 1987, aged 55, in New York City. Bill de Mello, a brother, recounts in his book Anthony deMello: The Happy Wanderer that Tony's body was found by Fr. Frank Stroud S.J. According to Stroud, de Mello's body was curled up in a fetal position. His official death certificate lists the immediate cause of his death as "Atherosclerotic coronary artery disease with recent thrombosis of left circumflex branch."

== Posthumous controversy ==
In 1998, 11 years after de Mello's death, the Congregation for the Doctrine of the Faith (CDF) under the leadership of its Cardinal-Prefect, Joseph Ratzinger (who later became Pope Benedict XVI), conducted a review of de Mello's work and released a comment stating that while "his works, which almost always take the form of brief stories, contain some valid elements of oriental wisdom ... [which] can be helpful in achieving self-mastery, in breaking the bonds and feelings that keep us from being free, and in approaching with serenity the various vicissitudes of life," some of de Mello's views, expressed particularly in his later work, "are incompatible with the Catholic faith and can cause grave harm".

In particular, the CDF wrote that while "especially in his early writings, Father de Mello, while revealing the influence of Buddhist and Taoist spiritual currents, remained within the lines of Christian spirituality", they understood de Mello's view of Jesus as "a master alongside others", objected to the idea that "the question of destiny after death is declared to be irrelevant; only the present life should be of interest", and expressed further concern that "the author's statements on the final destiny of man give rise to perplexity".

The Indian magazine Outlook saw this as an attempt by Rome to undermine the clergy in Asia amid widening fissures between Rome and the Asian Church. De Mello's books are available in many Catholic bookshops in the West, but sometimes include an advisory that they were written in a multi-religious context and are not intended to be manuals on Christian doctrine. Father Lisbert D'Souza (president of the Jesuit Conferences of South Asia), who knew de Mello from 1961, was the Jesuit provincial superior who presided at de Mello's funeral in Bombay in June 1987. He stated that "If one understood the context in which his ideas were presented, there [would be] no problem", and that "[de Mello] was instrumental in popularizing the full (30-day) Ignatian retreat in India".

== Bibliography ==
A number of de Mello's works were published posthumously as collections or based on notes or recordings of his conferences.

- Sadhana: A Way to God, 1978. ISBN 0-385-19614-8
- Wake Up! Spirituality for Today, 90 minutes of talks given before a live audience
- The Song of the Bird, Image, 1982. ISBN 0-385-19615-6
- Wellsprings, 1984. ISBN 978-0-385-19617-8
- One Minute Wisdom, Image, 1985. ISBN 0-385-24290-5
- The Heart of the Enlightened, Doubleday, 1987. ISBN 0-385-24672-2
- Taking Flight, Image, 1988. ISBN 0-385-41371-8
- Awareness, Image, 1990. ISBN 978-0-385-24937-9
- Contact with God, Loyola Press, 1991. ISBN 0-8294-0726-X
- The Way to Love, 1992. ISBN 978-0-385-24939-3
- One Minute Nonsense, Loyola University Press, 1992 ISBN 0-8294-0742-1
- More One Minute Nonsense, Loyola University Press, 1993 ISBN 0-8294-0749-9
- Call to Love, Gujarat Sahitya Prakash, 1996
- Rooted in God, St Pauls, 1997
- Awakening, Image, 2003. ISBN 978-0-385-50995-4
- A Way to God for Today, RCL Benziger, 2007
- Seek God Everywhere, Image, 2010 ISBN 978-0-385-53176-4
- The Prayer of the Frog Vol. 1 & Vol. 2. In the English printing, these are titled Taking Flight and The Heart of the Enlightened
