= Alaric Jans =

American film and theater composer (born 1949)

- Born: January 27, 1949 (age 77); St. Louis, Missouri
- Other names: Rokko
- Occupation: Composer
- Spouse: June Shellene
- Children: 1
- Website: www.alaricjans.com

Alaric "Rokko" Jans (born January 27, 1949) is an American film and theater composer.

== Career ==
Jans co-wrote with James Quinn the music and lyrics of the 1979 musical adaptation of John R. Powers' Do Black Patent Leather Shoes Really Reflect Up?. Jans, along with William H. Macy and David Kovacs, also participated in the revival of John Stasey's 1964 children's musical, The Adventures of Captain Marbles and His Acting Squad at David Mamet's St. Nicholas Theatre; he served as the composer and the co-lyricist of that musical. He has also composed music for films directed by Mamet, such as House of Games (1987), Things Change (1988), Homicide (1991) and The Winslow Boy (1999). In 2009, Jans composed the music for the Chicago Shakespeare Theater's production of Twelfth Night. Jans also co-wrote with Robert Sickinger the 2014 musical adaptation of Charles Dickens's Nicholas Nickleby.

Jans shared a 2008 Tony Award as a member of Chicago Shakespeare Theater.

== Personal life ==
Jans was born in St. Louis, Missouri, the son of Paul Jans. He grew up in Philadelphia and Lincoln Park. Jans attended Harvard University.

Jans was married to singer-composer June Shellene. The couple resides in Chicago. They have a son by the name of Joe.
