= Los Angeles Film Critics Association Award for Best Cinematography =

Annual US film award

The Los Angeles Film Critics Association Award for Best Cinematography is one of the annual film awards given by the Los Angeles Film Critics Association.

== Winners ==
=== 1970s ===
Year	Winner	Cinematographer(s)
1975	Barry Lyndon	John Alcott
1976	Bound for Glory	Haskell Wexler
1977	Julia	Douglas Slocombe
1978	Days of Heaven	Néstor Almendros
1979	The Black Stallion	Caleb Deschanel

=== 1980s ===
Year	Winner	Cinematographer(s)
1980	Tess	Ghislain Cloquet and Geoffrey Unsworth (posthumous)
1981	Reds	Vittorio Storaro
1982	Blade Runner	Jordan Cronenweth
1983	Fanny and Alexander (Fanny och Alexander)	Sven Nykvist
1984	The Killing Fields	Chris Menges
1985	Out of Africa	David Watkin
1986	The Mission	Chris Menges
1987	The Last Emperor	Vittorio Storaro
1988	Wings of Desire (Der Himmel über Berlin)	Henri Alekan
1989	The Fabulous Baker Boys	Michael Ballhaus

=== 1990s ===
Year	Winner	Cinematographer(s)
1990	Goodfellas	Michael Ballhaus
1991	Barton Fink	Roger Deakins
1991	Homicide	Roger Deakins
1992	Raise the Red Lantern (Da hong deng long gao gao gua)	Zhao Fei
1993	Schindler's List	Janusz Kamiński
1993	The Piano	Stuart Dryburgh
1994	Ed Wood	Stefan Czapsky
1995	Shanghai Triad (Yao a yao yao dao waipo qiao)	Lü Yue
1996	The English Patient	John Seale
1996	Michael Collins	Chris Menges
1997	L.A. Confidential	Dante Spinotti
1998	Saving Private Ryan	Janusz Kamiński
1999	The Insider	Dante Spinotti

=== 2000s ===
Year	Winner	Cinematographer(s)
2000	Crouching Tiger, Hidden Dragon (Wo hu cang long)	Peter Pau
2001	The Man Who Wasn't There	Roger Deakins
2002	Far from Heaven	Edward Lachman
2003	Girl with a Pearl Earring	Eduardo Serra
2004	Collateral	Dion Beebe and Paul Cameron
2005	Good Night, and Good Luck.	Robert Elswit
2006	Children of Men	Emmanuel Lubezki
2007	The Diving Bell and the Butterfly (Le scaphandre et le papillon)	Janusz Kamiński
2008	Still Life (Sanxia haoren)	Yu Lik-wai
2009	The White Ribbon (Das weiße Band)	Christian Berger

=== 2010s ===
Year	Winner	Cinematographer(s)
2010	Black Swan	Matthew Libatique
2011	The Tree of Life	Emmanuel Lubezki
2012	Skyfall	Roger Deakins
2013	Gravity	Emmanuel Lubezki
2014	Birdman	Emmanuel Lubezki
2015	Mad Max: Fury Road	John Seale
2016	Moonlight	James Laxton
2017	The Shape of Water	Dan Laustsen
2018	Roma	Alfonso Cuarón
2019	Atlantics	Claire Mathon
2019	Portrait of a Lady on Fire	Claire Mathon

=== 2020s ===
Year	Winner	Cinematographer(s)
2020	Small Axe	Shabier Kirchner
2021	The Power of the Dog	Ari Wegner
2022	EO	Michał Dymek
2023	Poor Things	Robbie Ryan
2024	Nickel Boys	Jomo Fray
2025	Train Dreams	Adolpho Veloso

== Multiple winners ==
4 wins

- Emmanuel Lubezki (2006, 2011, 2013, 2014)

3 wins

- Roger Deakins (1991, 2001, 2012)
- Janusz Kamiński (1993, 1998, 2007)
- Chris Menges (1984, 1986, 1996)

2 wins

- Michael Ballhaus (1989, 1990)
- John Seale (1996, 2015)
- Dante Spinotti (1997, 1999)
- Vittorio Storaro (1981, 1987)

== See also ==
- Academy Award for Best Cinematography
