= Do Black Patent Leather Shoes Really Reflect Up? =

1975 novel by John R. Powers

- Broadway Playbill
- Music: James Quinn; Alaric Jans
- Lyrics: James Quinn; Alaric Jans
- Book: John R. Powers
- Basis: Powers' novel Do Black Patent Leather Shoes Really Reflect Up?
- Productions: 1979 Chicago; 1982 Broadway

Do Black Patent Leather Shoes Really Reflect Up? is a novel published in 1975 by author John R. Powers. It was subsequently adapted into a Broadway musical and a screenplay.

== Film in development ==
Director and author Ken Kwapis (Sisterhood of the Traveling Pants and He's Just Not That Into You), drafted a screenplay for a non-musical film version of the book in late 2005.

== Theater ==
The show has become a highly popular choice of regional and community theatres. The original 1979 Chicago production ran for over three years at the Forum Theater, and featured Megan Mullally, Anthony Crivello and Chloe Webb among many others. "Shoes" broke house records during its two runs in Philadelphia. However, the show did not duplicate its success on Broadway. Opening on May 27, 1982 at the Alvin Theatre, it closed on May 30 after five performances. It was directed by Mike Nussbaum (Chicago and Broadway) and choreographed by Thommie Walsh (Broadway). In addition to Russ Thacker as Eddie and Maureen Moore as Becky, the cast included Don Stitt, Vicki Lewis and Jason Graae.

== Musical ==
The 1950s era story from the original books by John R. Powers was also turned into a musical with music and lyrics by James Quinn and Alaric 'Rokko' Jans in 1979. Produced by Libby Adler Mages and Daniel Golman of Mavin Productions. The original coming of age musical involves the 1950s Catholic education of eight Chicago children, following them from the start of elementary school through the senior prom and beyond. Along the way it touches on such topics as first confessions, puppy love, patron saints, teacher's pets, sex education classes, and the importance of not wearing patent leather shoes as they could reflect up under the school uniform's plaid pleated skirts. One of the central plot elements running through the musical is that Eddie Ryan is infatuated with a chubby girl, Becky Bakowski. She becomes his best friend, and he later falls in love with her when she matures into a beautiful young woman. Unfortunately, she has decided to become a nun. Many years later Eddie returns to his old elementary school to inquire about Becky only to find she has left the order and is teaching in a small school in Indiana. At the end of the musical they are reunited.

An original cast recording was released by Bay Cities Records.

The licensing agent for all performances is Samuel French, Inc., which calculates over 250 performances are given each year in North America.

== Song list ==
Act I

- Get Ready, Eddie
- The Greatest Gift
- Little Fat Girls
- It's the Nuns
- Cookie Cutters
- Queen of the May
- Patron Saints
- Private Parts
- How Far is Too Far?
- Act I Finale

Act II

- Entr'Acte
- Doo-Waa, Doo-Wee
- I Must Be in Love
- Friends, The Best of
- The Greatest Gift (rep.)
- Mad Bomber/We're Saving Ourselves for Marriage
- Late Bloomer & Prom Montage
- Friends, The Best of (rep.)
- Thank God
