= Flesh (1932 film) =

1932 film directed by John Ford

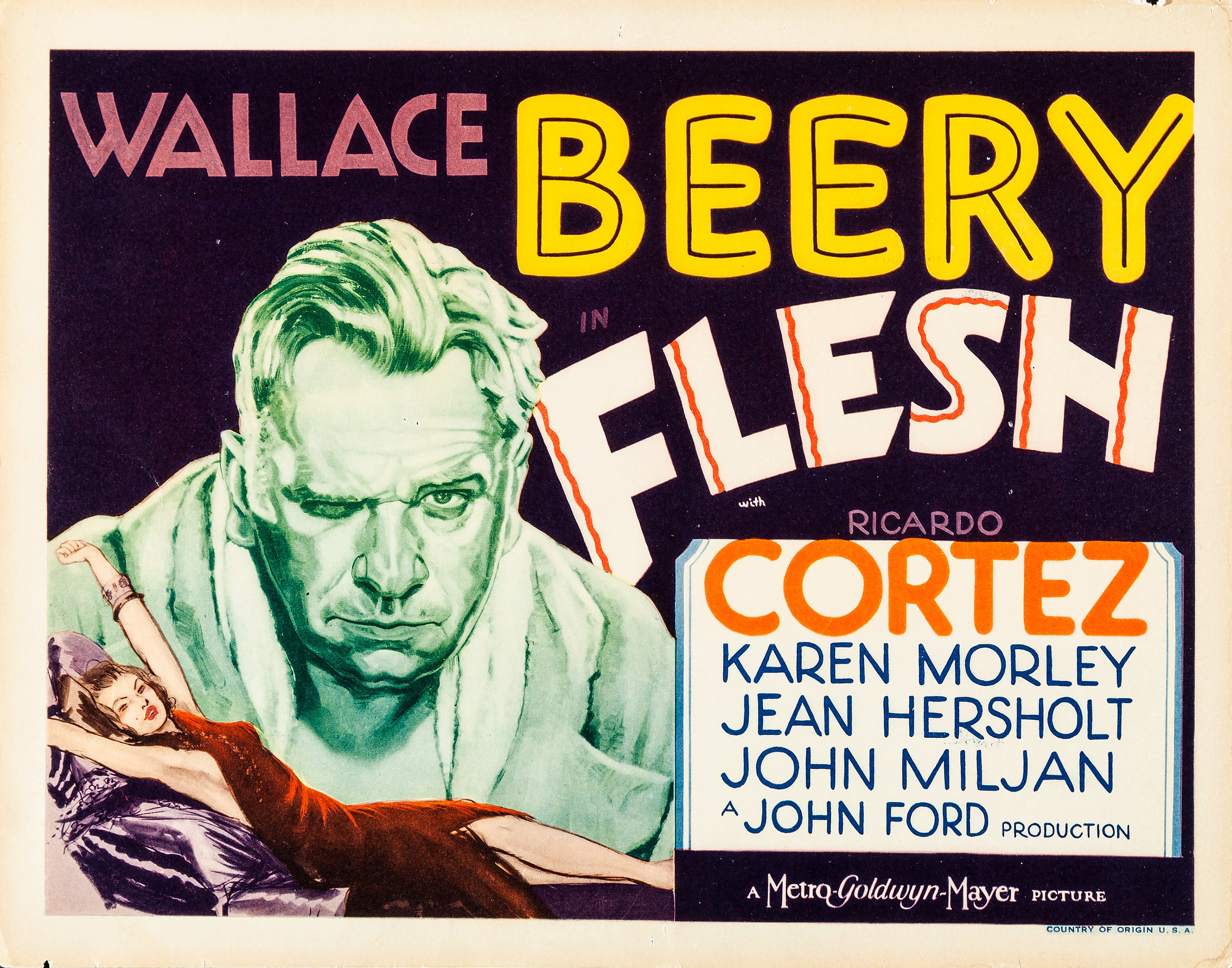
- Lobby card
- Directed by: John Ford
- Written by: Moss Hart; William Faulkner; Edmund Goulding; Leonard Praskins (adaptation); Edgar Allan Woolf (adaptation)
- Produced by: John Ford; John W. Considine Jr.
- Starring: Wallace Beery; Ricardo Cortez; Karen Morley; Jean Hersholt
- Cinematography: Arthur Edeson
- Edited by: William S. Gray
- Music by: Alfred Newman
- Production company: Metro-Goldwyn-Mayer
- Distributed by: Loew's Inc.
- Release date: December 8, 1932
- Running time: 96 minutes
- Country: United States
- Language: English/German
- Budget: $480,000
- Box office: $837,000

Flesh is a 1932 American pre-Code drama film starring Wallace Beery as a German wrestler. Some of the script was written by Moss Hart and an uncredited William Faulkner, and the film was co-produced and directed by John Ford, who removed his director's credit from the picture.

== Plot ==
In Germany, American convict Laura is released from prison because she is pregnant. Before leaving, she assures her boyfriend and fellow American convict Nicky, who does not know of her pregnancy, that they will reunite when he gets out. Meanwhile, the German wrestler Polakai has just won another bout in a string of victories on his way to a national championship, but he works for income at a local beer hall, hoisting large beer barrels on his shoulders to both entertain and serve the customers.

Laura arrives and orders a large meal but is unable to pay. When Mr. Herman, the beer hall's owner, is about to call the police, Polakai offers to pay for the meal himself. Later that evening with nowhere to go, Laura accepts Polakai's offer to stay in his small apartment, which is also owned by Herman and his wife. The stay turns out to be a lengthy one. It is implied that Polakai and Laura sleep together, but even though he proposes to her several times, she turns him down. Though she is touched by his simple but generous nature, Laura is still in love with Nick. When Polakai catches her stealing his money to obtain Nick's release, Laura confesses but claims that Nick is her brother. Once again, the gullible wrestler comes to her aid.

Nick arrives and plays along with the ruse that he's Laura's brother. When he learns that Laura is pregnant, though, he takes money that Polakai has given him and immediately heads back to America. With Nick gone, Laura finally assents to Polakai's proposal and reveals her pregnancy, leaving him to believe that he will be the father. On the night that the child is born, Polakai wins the German wrestling championship. Laura still pines for Nick despite his having left her, but Polakai thinks that she's homesick for America. The Hermans have already emigrated to the U.S., and Polakai decides that he and Laura should follow them, hoping that he can win a world wrestling championship there.

In America, Polakai and Laura are reunited with Nick, whom Laura has forgiven and who offers to be Polakai's manager, although he is actually in league with Willard, a crooked promoter. As Polakai learns how his matches are being rigged, he begins to drink. Laura tries to sober him up and get him to win his championship match, which he is supposed to lose, but Nick begins to beat her. Polakai, coming to, strangles Nick. He goes on to the wrestling match anyway, which he wins, only to be arrested. In the aftermath, the district attorney seems willing to go light on Polakai, and Laura promises to go away so that she will not hurt him anymore. Polakai, however, holds her hand.

== Cast ==
- Wallace Beery as Polakai
- Ricardo Cortez as Nicky
- Karen Morley as Laura
- Jean Hersholt as Mr. Herman
- John Miljan as Willard
- Herman Bing as Pepi
- Vince Barnett as Karl
- Greta Meyer as Mrs. Herman
- Edward Brophy as Dolan
- Billy Bletcher as Man in Cafe (uncredited)
- Ward Bond as Muscles Manning (uncredited)
- Frank Reicher as Warden (uncredited)

== Box office ==
The film grossed a total of $837,000: $487,000 from the U.S. and Canada and $350,000 in other markets, resulting in a profit of $49,000.

== Allusions in other films ==
Nearly six decades after the release of Flesh, the title character in the Coen brothers 1991 film Barton Fink struggles to overcome writer's block while he tries to write a wrestling picture for Wallace Beery. The Coens were reportedly unaware of this 1932 production when they developed their film, which features a character based somewhat on William Faulkner, whom Fink consults while writing his script.
