= Roger Deakins =

British cinematographer (born 1949)

Sir Roger Deakins CBE
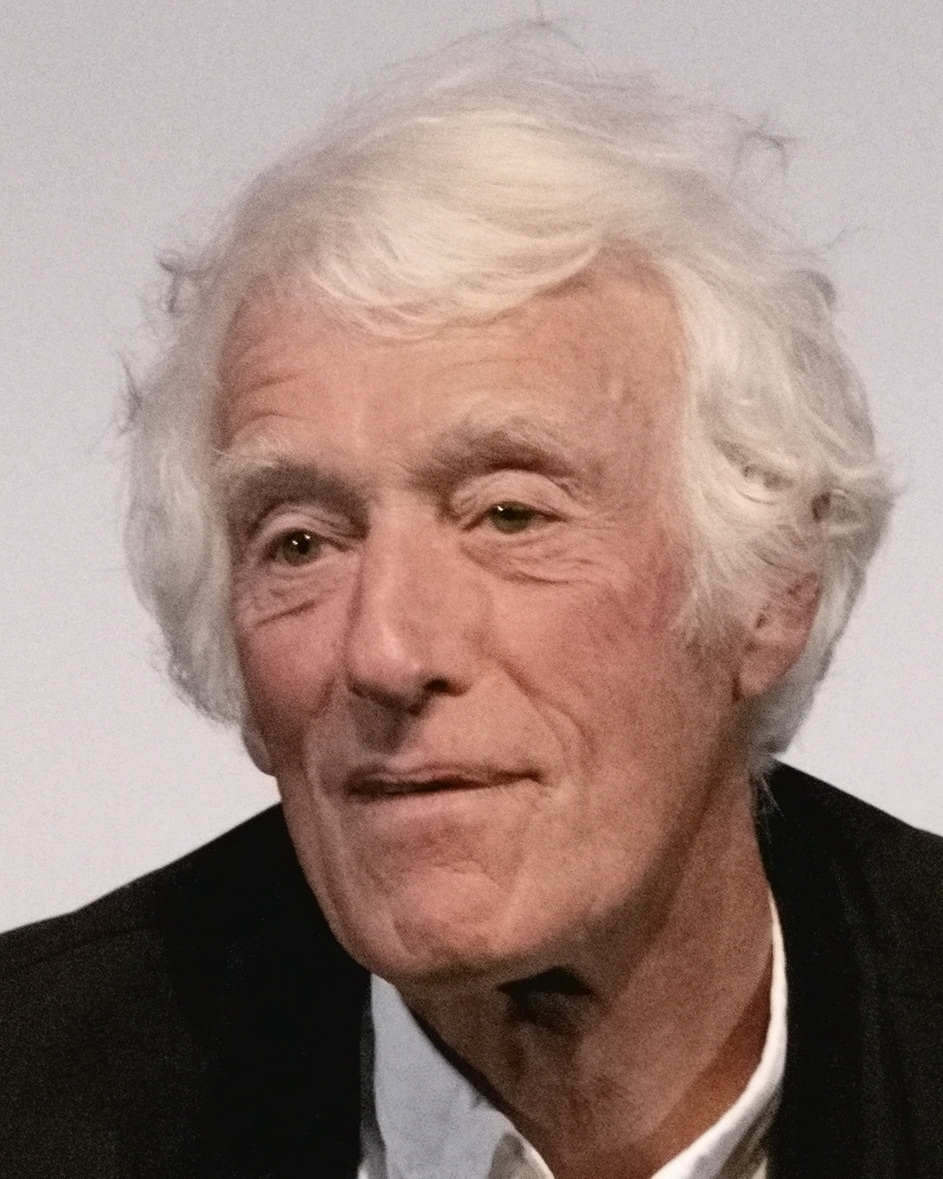
- Deakins in 2021
- Born: Roger Alexander Deakins; 24 May 1949 (age 77); Torquay, Devon, England
- Education: Torquay Boys' Grammar School; Bath Academy of Art; National Film School
- Occupation: Cinematographer
- Years active: 1975–2022
- Organization(s): British Society of Cinematographers; American Society of Cinematographers
- Spouse: Isabella James Purefoy Ellis (m. 1991)
- Awards: Full list
- Website: rogerdeakins.com

Sir Roger Alexander Deakins ASC, BSC (born 24 May 1949) is an English cinematographer. Regarded as one of the greatest and most influential cinematographers in cinema history, he is the recipient of numerous accolades, including two Academy Awards for Best Cinematography and five BAFTA Awards for Best Cinematography. He has collaborated multiple times with directors such as the Coen brothers, Sam Mendes, Michael Radford, and Denis Villeneuve. Some of his best-known works include The Shawshank Redemption (1994), Fargo (1996), O Brother, Where Art Thou? (2000), A Beautiful Mind (2001), No Country for Old Men (2007), True Grit (2010), Skyfall (2012), Sicario (2015), Blade Runner 2049 (2017), and 1917 (2019), the last two of which earned him Academy Awards.

An alumnus of the National Film and Television School, Deakins was named and serves as an Honorary Fellow of the school in recognition of his "outstanding contribution[s] to ... British film". He is a member of the British Society of Cinematographers and the American Society of Cinematographers, and in 2011 received a Lifetime Achievement Award from the latter organization. Deakins was bestowed a CBE by the Palace for his services to film in 2013, and knighted in the 2021 New Year Honours.

== Early life and education ==
Deakins was born on 24 May 1949, in Torquay, Devon. His father ran a construction company, while his mother was an actress and amateur painter. Deakins attended Torquay Boys' Grammar School. He took up painting from a young age, and subsequently enrolled in the Bath Academy of Art in Bath, Somerset, where he studied graphic design. While studying in Bath, Deakins developed a passion for photography; he cited the photographer Roger Mayne, a guest lecturer at the academy, as a major source of inspiration.

After college, Deakins applied to the newly opened National Film School, but was denied admission as his photography was considered not "filmic" enough. He spent the following year wandering the countryside, photographing rural life in North Devon, before finally being admitted to the National Film School in 1972. Director Michael Radford was one of Deakins's schoolmates.

== Career ==
=== Early career ===
After graduating, Deakins found work as a cameraman, assisting in the production of projects for about seven years. An early project of his involved filming a nine-month trip on a yacht as an entrant in the Whitbread Round the World Race, titled Around the World with Ridgeway. Deakins was hired to film two documentaries in Africa. His first, Zimbabwe, was a clandestine documentation of the Rhodesian Bush War, while his second, Eritrea – Behind Enemy Lines, depicted the Eritrean War of Independence. He also shot anthropological documentaries in India and Sudan.

During the late 1970s and early 1980s, Deakins was involved in a number of music-related projects, including Blue Suede Shoes, a music documentary about the British rockabilly scene, the concert film Van Morrison in Ireland, and the Ray Davies musical film Return to Waterloo. He also made short music videos for Herbie Hancock, Eric Clapton, Marvin Gaye, Tracey Ullman, Madness, Level 42 and Meat Loaf.

=== Feature films ===
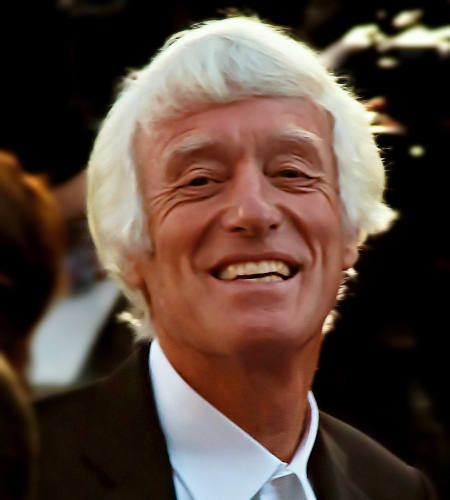
Deakins at the 83rd Academy Awards in February 2011

Deakins's first dramatic project was a miniseries titled Wolcott, about a black detective working in the East End of London. The camerawork of the miniseries impressed his former schoolmate and frequent collaborator Michael Radford, who enlisted Deakins for their first dramatic feature, the 1983 film Another Time, Another Place. The film screened at the Cannes Film Festival and was well-received; subsequently, Deakins and Radford teamed up again on Nineteen Eighty-Four (1984), based upon George Orwell's novel of the same name. The film was praised for its bold, unusual palette, which Deakins achieved through a process known as bleach bypass, where the silver is retained in the print, creating a washed-out look that reflected Orwell's bleak vision. Deakins was the first Western cinematographer to use the technique, which has since become highly influential and can be seen in films such as Seven (1995) and Saving Private Ryan (1998). Throughout the 1980s, Deakins continued working in Britain, serving as cinematographer for films including Defence of the Realm (1986), Sid and Nancy (1986), White Mischief (1987; his third feature film with Radford), Stormy Monday (1988) and Pascali's Island (1988).

In 1991, Deakins began his long-term collaboration with the Coen brothers, starting with the film Barton Fink. The Coens had been impressed with Deakins's work, and reached out to him after their previous collaborator Barry Sonnenfeld left to pursue a career in directing. The film won the Coens the Festival de Cannes 1991 Palme d'Or and Best Director awards (and John Turturro the award for Best Actor), and earned Deakins best cinematography awards from New York, Chicago and Los Angeles film critics circles. In 1994, the year Deakins was admitted to the American Society of Cinematographers, he served as cinematographer for The Shawshank Redemption, which earned him his first Academy Award nomination for Best Cinematography, and his first American Society of Cinematographers Award. He received two further Academy Award nominations in that decade, for Fargo (1996) and Kundun (1997).

For the Coen brothers film O Brother, Where Art Thou? (2000), Deakins spent some two months fine-tuning the look, turning the lush green Mississippi landscape into a burnt, autumnal yellow and desaturating the overall image. This feat made O Brother the first ever feature film to be digitally color-corrected in its entirety, and earned Deakins his fourth Academy Award nomination. The following year, for his work in the Coen brothers' The Man Who Wasn't There (2001), Deakins received his fifth Oscar nomination and won his first BAFTA Award for Best Cinematography.

In 2008, Deakins received dual Oscar nominations—his sixth and seventh—for The Assassination of Jesse James by the Coward Robert Ford (2007) and No Country for Old Men (2007). He was the first cinematographer to achieve such a feat since Robert Surtees, who was nominated for The Last Picture Show and Summer of '42 in 1972. Deakins served as director of photography for Stephen Daldry's The Reader (2008) but left mid-production due to delays and previous commitments, and was replaced by Chris Menges. The two cinematographers received a shared nomination for Best Cinematography at the 81st Academy Awards.

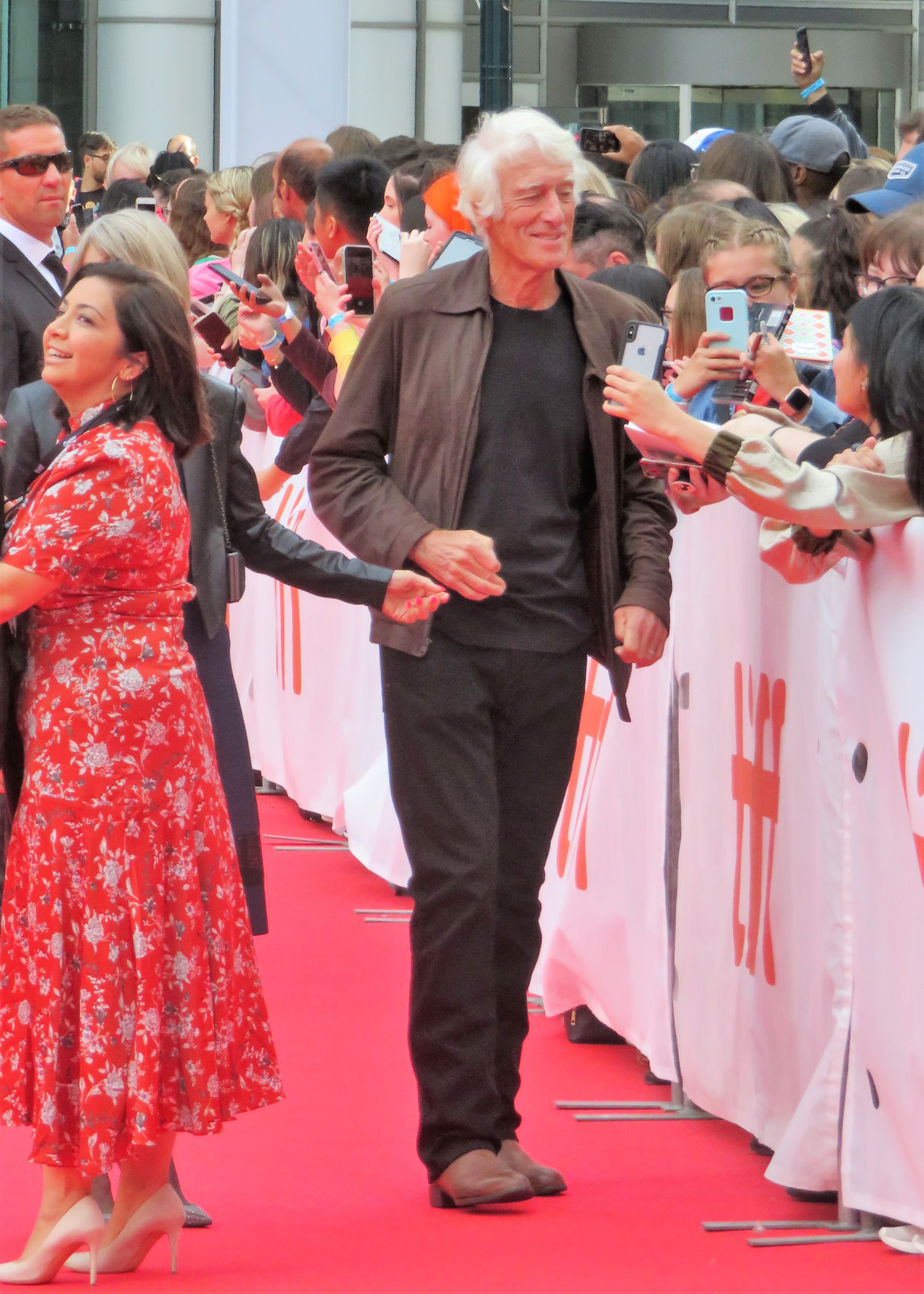
Deakins at the 2019 Toronto International Film Festival for the premiere of The Goldfinch

Deakins worked with the Coens on the 2010 western True Grit—their eleventh collaboration—for which he received his ninth Oscar nomination. Deakins signed on as cinematographer for Skyfall (2012), having previously worked with director Sam Mendes on Jarhead (2005) and Revolutionary Road (2008). For his work, Deakins received another Academy Award nomination for Best Cinematography, eventually losing to Claudio Miranda of Life of Pi—his 10th nomination without securing a win. In addition to his live-action work, Deakins served as both cinematographer and visual consultant on the 2011 animated film Rango (2011), and also served as a visual consultant on animated features, including WALL-E (2008), Puss in Boots (2011), Rise of the Guardians (2012), The Croods (2013), the How to Train Your Dragon trilogy (2010, 2014 and 2019). and Vivo (2021).

Starting with Prisoners (2013), Deakins began working with director Denis Villeneuve. The two proceeded to collaborate on Sicario (2015) and Blade Runner 2049 (2017), with Deakins earning Oscar nominations for all three films. For his work on Blade Runner 2049, Deakins received his first Academy Award for Best Cinematography on his 14th nomination. Deakins reunited with Sam Mendes on the 2019 war film 1917, filmed and edited to appear as two continuous shots, for which he received his second Academy Award on his 15th nomination.

== Personal life ==
Deakins married Isabella James Purefoy Ellis (b. January 1954, professionally known as James Ellis Deakins and often referred to simply as James) on 11 December 1991. They had met in 1991 in Los Angeles on the set of David Mamet's film Homicide, where she was working as the script supervisor. The two began dating after the Homicide production finished and they married within about six months. Since then, James Ellis has "oversee[n] the digital workflow of... film[s]", and they have worked together on various projects, including The Goldfinch and 1917. As of February 2020, they reside in Kingswear, Devon, and Santa Monica, California.

Deakins has kept a boat since beginning such activities with his father as a child—with him, first a sailboat, then a motorboat—and he currently keeps one in Torquay, his hometown, to which he often goes (and from which he fishes) when in Britain.

When in Devon, he enjoys running, and has maintained a passion for still photography. In 2021, Deakins released a book of his black-and-white still photographs, Byways. This was followed by Reflections: On Cinematography, published by Octopus in 2025.

Since 2005, Deakins has maintained a website through which he frequently communicates with admirers and other industry practitioners. His correspondence includes answering fan questions and offering cinematography tips. Since April 2020, he and his wife have hosted the Team Deakins podcast, whose guests have included Sam Mendes, John Crowley, and Denis Villeneuve.

In July 2026, Deakins was the guest for BBC Radio 4's Desert Island Discs. His music choices included King Crimson's "21st Century Schizoid Man" and Paul Brady's "The Island", with his favourite track "Aqaba" by June Tabor. His book choice was Herman Melville's Moby-Dick and his luxury item some fishing tackle.

== Filmography ==
=== Film ===
Year	Title	Director	Notes
1977	Cruel Passion	Chris Boger	
1983	Another Time, Another Place	Michael Radford	1st collaboration with Radford
1984	Nineteen Eighty-Four	Michael Radford	
1985	The Innocent	John Mackenzie	
1985	Shadey	Philip Saville	
1985	Defence of the Realm	David Drury	
1986	Sid and Nancy	Alex Cox	
1987	Personal Services	Terry Jones	
1987	The Kitchen Toto	Harry Hook	
1987	White Mischief	Michael Radford	
1988	Stormy Monday	Mike Figgis	
1988	Pascali's Island	James Dearden	
1988	Young Distance	Vito Zagarrio	With Luigi Verga
1990	Mountains of the Moon	Bob Rafelson	
1990	Air America	Roger Spottiswoode	
1990	The Long Walk Home	Richard Pearce	
1991	Barton Fink	Coen Brothers	1st collaboration with the Coen Brothers
1991	Homicide	David Mamet	
1992	Thunderheart	Michael Apted	
1992	Passion Fish	John Sayles	
1993	The Secret Garden	Agnieszka Holland	
1994	The Hudsucker Proxy	Coen Brothers	
1994	The Shawshank Redemption	Frank Darabont	
1995	Dead Man Walking	Tim Robbins	
1996	Fargo	Coen Brothers	
1996	Courage Under Fire	Edward Zwick	
1997	Kundun	Martin Scorsese	
1998	The Big Lebowski	Coen Brothers	
1998	The Siege	Edward Zwick	
1999	Anywhere but Here	Wayne Wang	
1999	The Hurricane	Norman Jewison	
2000	O Brother, Where Art Thou?	Coen Brothers	
2001	The Man Who Wasn't There	Coen Brothers	
2001	A Beautiful Mind	Ron Howard	
2003	Levity	Ed Solomon	
2003	Intolerable Cruelty	Coen Brothers	
2003	House of Sand and Fog	Vadim Perelman	
2004	The Ladykillers	Coen Brothers	
2004	The Village	M. Night Shyamalan	
2005	Jarhead	Sam Mendes	1st collaboration with Mendes
2007	No Country for Old Men	Coen Brothers	
2007	In the Valley of Elah	Paul Haggis	
2007	The Assassination of Jesse James by the Coward Robert Ford	Andrew Dominik	
2008	Doubt	John Patrick Shanley	
2008	The Reader	Stephen Daldry	With Chris Menges
2008	Revolutionary Road	Sam Mendes	
2009	A Serious Man	Coen Brothers	
2010	The Company Men	John Wells	
2010	True Grit	Coen Brothers	
2011	In Time	Andrew Niccol	
2012	Skyfall	Sam Mendes	
2013	Prisoners	Denis Villeneuve	1st collaboration with Villeneuve
2014	Unbroken	Angelina Jolie	
2015	Sicario	Denis Villeneuve	
2016	Hail, Caesar!	Coen Brothers	
2017	Blade Runner 2049	Denis Villeneuve	
2019	The Goldfinch	John Crowley	
2019	1917	Sam Mendes	
2022	Empire of Light	Sam Mendes	

Documentary film

Year	Title	Director	Notes
1976	Welcome to Britain	Ben Lewin	
1977	Before Hindsight	Jonathan Lewis	
1978	Chimurenga - The War in Zimbabwe	Antonia Caccia	
1980	Blue Suede Shoes	Curtis Clark	
1979	Van Morrison in Ireland	Michael Radford	With Jeff Baynes, Bill Marshall and Chris Morphet
1983	Alan Bush: A Life	Anna Ambrose	With Dick Pope
1984	The Cinema of Stephen Dwoskin	Anna Ambrose	

=== Television ===
Miniseries

Year	Title	Director
1981	Wolcott	Colin Bucksey

TV movies

Year	Title	Director
1984	The House	Mike Figgis
1984	Return to Waterloo	Ray Davies
2001	Dinner with Friends	Norman Jewison

== Technique and reputation ==
Deakins is often cited as one of the greatest and most influential cinematographers of all time. His consistent output led fellow cinematographer Robert Elswit to jokingly suggest that the American Society of Cinematographers should establish a special award for "films shot by Roger Deakins." Deakins received 13 Academy Awards nominations without a win, a fact often lamented by journalists and film critics. His first Oscar win (on his 14th nomination) for Blade Runner 2049 at the 90th Academy Awards was widely reported and met with great enthusiasm.

Deakins is among the most respected and sought-after cinematographers in the film business. His involvement in a film could secure the casting of established stars—a distinction usually reserved for auteur directors. He was hired to shoot The Shawshank Redemption at the insistence of Tim Robbins, who had previously worked with him on the Coen brothers film The Hudsucker Proxy. Josh Brolin agreed to join the cast of Sicario only after hearing of Deakins's involvement. When Ryan Gosling accepted his role in Blade Runner 2049, he cited the involvement of Deakins as a factor for his decision.

== Awards and recognition ==
Deakins has been nominated for sixteen Academy Awards, winning the Academy Award for Best Cinematography twice—on his fourteenth and fifteenth nominations—for Blade Runner 2049 (2017) and 1917 (2019). He has been named as an Honorary Fellow of his alma mater, the National Film and Television School in Beaconsfield, Buckinghamshire, an honour which recognises "outstanding contribution to the British film and television industry" On 28 February 2020.

Deakins is the recipient of five BAFTA Awards for Best Cinematography, for The Man Who Wasn't There (2001), No Country for Old Men (2007), True Grit (2010), Blade Runner 2049 (2017), 1917 (2019), each in the year following their release. As well, two films that he shot, Fargo (1996), and A Serious Man (2009), won Independent Spirit Awards for Best Cinematography in the year after their release.

He received the Royal Photographic Society's Lumière Award for major achievement in cinematography, video or animation in 2009. The National Board of Review, a group of New York-based reviewers whose organization dates to 1909, honoured Deakins in 2007 with its award for Career Achievement in Cinematography. Deakins went on to receive the American Society of Cinematographers and the British Society of Cinematographers Lifetime Achievement Award in 2011 and 2015 respectively.

Deakins was appointed Commander of the Order of the British Empire (CBE) in the 2013 Birthday Honours for services to film. He was knighted in the 2021 New Year Honours, also for services to film.

== See also ==
- List of British Academy Award nominees and winners
