= John R. Powers =

American novelist and playwright

- Born: November 30, 1945
- Died: January 17, 2013 (aged 67); Lake Geneva, Wisconsin
- Education: Loyola University; Northwestern University
- Occupation: Author
- Writing career
- Notable work: Do Black Patent Leather Shoes Really Reflect Up?

John R. Powers (November 30, 1945 – January 17, 2013) was an American novelist and playwright.

== Early life ==
Powers grew up in the Mt. Greenwood neighborhood on the far southwest side of Chicago. He held a Ph.D. in communications from Northwestern University and was a professor of speech and performing arts at Northeastern Illinois University. He received his undergraduate degree in sociology from Loyola University and was a graduate of Brother Rice High School in Chicago.

== Work ==
Powers wrote four books of fiction, The Last Catholic in America (Dutton 1973), Do Black Patent Leather Shoes Really Reflect Up? (Regnery 1975), The Unoriginal Sinner and the Ice Cream God (Contemporary 1977), and The Junk Drawer, Corner Store, Front Porch Blues (Dutton 1992). He also wrote the self-help book Odditude (HCI 2007). These books relate his experience of growing up in 1950s Chicago. The first three books, referred to as the "Eddie Ryan Trilogy," have been re-issued by Loyola Press.

Powers was awarded two Emmy Awards for his writing. The first was in 1984 for Lovers and Lanes, written for WMAQ TV channel 5 in Chicago. The second was in 1988 for Going Home, written for WLS TV channel 7.

Do Black Patent Leather Shoes Really Reflect Up? was selected for inclusion on the American Library Association’s list of Best Books for Young Adults in 1975. Powers wrote the libretto to a Broadway musical based loosely on characters and events from his first two novels entitled Do Black Patent Leather Shoes Really Reflect Up? Powers was also the author of two one-man shows which he also performed. The first Scissors, Paper, Rock that was based on his Emmy Award-winning special Going Home and the second, which ran in Chicago, Life's Not Fair, So What.

== Personal life ==
Powers lived in Lake Geneva, Wisconsin with his wife JaNelle Meyers Powers, whom he met while she was performing in the original production of Do Black Patent Leather Shoes Really Reflect Up? as Mary Kenny, and two daughters: actress/playwright Jacey Powers and journalist Joy Victoria Powers.

Powers died in Lake Geneva, Wisconsin in 2013.
