= Loyola Press =

Publishing house

- Parent company: Society of Jesus
- Founded: 1912
- Successor: Loyola University Press (1912-1995)
- Country of origin: United States
- Headquarters location: Chicago, Illinois
- Distribution: self-distributed (US); Novalis (Canada); John Garratt Publishing (Australia)
- Publication types: books
- Official website: www.loyolapress.com

Loyola Press is a publishing house based in Chicago, Illinois. It is a nonprofit apostolate of the Midwest Province of the Society of Jesus. It has no connection with Loyola University Chicago.

It publishes school books for the parochial school market, as well as trade books for adults and children. In 1997, the press did publish a bestseller: The Gift of Peace, the last testament of Cardinal Joseph Bernardin.

== History of Loyola ==
Loyola University Press was founded in 1912 and became a separate non-profit in 1940 independent of any university. It changed its name to Loyola Press in 1995.

== Imprints ==
Loyola Press publishes Chicago-related titles under the Wild Onion imprint, Jesuit studies titles under the Jesuit Way banner, and textbooks under the Loyola University Press imprint.

== Notable authors ==
Loyola Press has published books by the following notable people:

- John Dear, S.J.
- James Martin, S.J.
- John R. Powers
- Richard Rohr, O.F.M.

== See also ==
- List of English-language book publishing companies
