= Homicide (1991 film) =

1991 film by David Mamet

- Theatrical release poster
- Directed by: David Mamet
- Written by: David Mamet
- Produced by: Michael Hausman; Edward R. Pressman
- Starring: Joe Mantegna; William H. Macy
- Cinematography: Roger Deakins
- Edited by: Barbara Tulliver
- Music by: Alaric Jans
- Production companies: Edward R. Pressman Film Corporation; Cinehaus Inc.
- Distributed by: Triumph Films
- Release date: October 9, 1991
- Running time: 102 minutes
- Country: United States
- Language: English
- Budget: $11 million
- Box office: $2.9 million

Homicide is a 1991 American crime drama film written and directed by David Mamet. The film's cast includes Joe Mantegna, William H. Macy, and Ving Rhames. It was entered in the 1991 Cannes Film Festival.

== Plot ==
Bobby Gold is a homicide detective on the trail of Robert Randolph, a drug-dealer and cop-killer on the FBI's Ten Most Wanted List. En route to nab an accomplice of Randolph, Gold and his partner Tim Sullivan happen upon a murder scene: the elderly Jewish owner of a candy store in a ghetto has been gunned down, reportedly for a fortune hidden in her basement. The deceased woman's son, a doctor, uses his clout to have Gold assigned to the case in the belief that Gold, himself Jewish, might be empathetic to his plight. Gold, however, seems to disregard his ethnicity and is irritated about being pulled off a much higher-profile case. Ultimately, though, this is offset by interactions with members of the Jewish community that play on Gold's feelings of inadequacy and inability to fit in.

A nighttime survey of the crime scene uncovers an important piece of the woman's past, and Gold's reluctance turns to curiosity, leading to the discovery of a Zionist organization operating in the city. The apparent power and sense of pride these people have is appealing to Gold, and he attempts to become a part of their group. Gold is thrust into a series of circumstances that test not only his loyalty to the badge, but also his newfound Jewish consciousness.

Gold finds the old woman at one time was running guns for a Jewish liberation group. The group is attempting to protect their people from threats within the community. When asked to steal a list of group member names from police evidence to protect the group, Gold objects and is rejected by the Jewish group leaders for denying his faith.

Asking the help of a Jewish woman in the group, Gold is led to a toy shop in the city that is a secret stronghold of Nazi sympathizers, filled with anti-Jewish propaganda - proving the Jewish group's fears of danger and antisemitism were true. Gold erupts in anger, setting off the bomb given to him by the woman, destroying the stronghold/toy shop.

He is again approached by the Jewish group to retrieve the list from police evidence. When he refuses, the group shows him photographs of his acts at the toy shop, attempting to blackmail him into assisting.

During a raid to apprehend Randolph, where Gold is late to arrive due to the meeting with the Jewish group, Sullivan dies in Gold's arms, killed by gunshot. Gold, filled with rage, says he will "kill that nigger" and charges through the building, where he loses his gun. He finds a heavy chain to use as a makeshift weapon and catches up to Randolph, who is attempting to escape through the basement. Randolph shoots him and talks mockingly to him while clearing a metal grate blocking his escape route. Gold informs him that it was Randolph's mother who turned him in, to which Randolph replies by shooting Gold again in the arm. As proof, Gold gives him the phony passport arranged by his mother, when suddenly a police officer off screen shoots Randolph in the chest, killing him.

Gold returns to the precinct to apologetic words from some of his fellow police officers, who now seem distant, possibly due to the circumstances of his partner's death. He is told he is "off homicide" and learns the old woman was killed by a pair of black kids, attempting to get the “fortune” hidden in her basement.

== Cast ==
- Joe Mantegna as Bobby Gold
- William H. Macy as Tim Sullivan
- Ving Rhames as Robert Randolph
- Natalia Nogulich as Chava
- Vincent Guastaferro as Lt. Senna
- J. J. Johnston as Jilly Curran
- Lionel Mark Smith as Charlie Olcott
- Rebecca Pidgeon as Miss Klein
- Ricky Jay as Aaron
- Roberta Custer as Cathy Bates
- Charles Stransky as Doug Brown
- Bernard Gray as James
- Paul Butler as Commissioner Walker
- Erica Gimpel as Woman with Randolph
- Colin Stinton as Walter B Wells

== Reception ==
As of January 2023, the film holds an approval rating of 88% on the review aggregator website Rotten Tomatoes based on 25 reviews. The website's consensus reads, "Guided by David Mamet's searing dialogue and assured direction, Homicide tells its morally complex story with an immersive mood and a crackling zeal." Roger Ebert praised it, giving it four out of four stars.

== Home media ==
The film was released on VHS in 1992 by Columbia TriStar Home Video and on DVD on October 13, 2003, by Columbia TriStar Home Entertainment.

On September 8, 2009, the film was given a DVD release by The Criterion Collection. This director-approved release included an audio commentary with Mamet and Macy, as well as cast interviews and a gag reel.
