= Aqualillies =

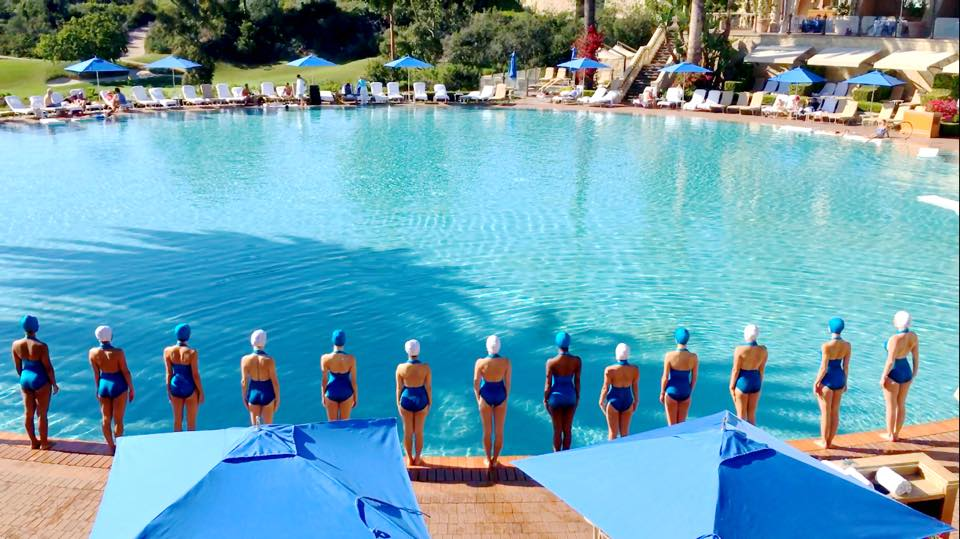
- Aqualillies at Heal the Bay Event featuring Brian Wilson of the Beach Boys.

Background information
- Origin: Los Angeles, California, United States
- Genres: Synchronised swimming, Dancing
- Years active: 2008- present
- Website: www.aqualillies.com

Aqualillies is a professional synchronised swimming/dance company founded in 2008 with teams in California, New York, Miami, Las Vegas, Canada, France, and Australia. They are known as pioneers in the renaissance of water ballet as entertainment. Their work has been seen most notably in the Coen Brothers' 2016 film Hail, Caesar!, Glee, Jane the Virgin, ABC's Splash, the TED (Conference), Miami Fashion Week, Kim Kardashian Toasts The Emmys, and for Esther Williams at the Turner Classic Movies's Film Festival. They also offer seasonal synchronized swimming fitness classes

== History ==
The company was founded by Mesha Kussman, a graduate of New York University (Experimental Theater Wing) in 2008 with the intention to enliven the Hollywood Pool Party scene with water entertainment. The initial company included a combination of former National Team swimmers and dancers who trained in swimming. The company's first residency was at the Hollywood Roosevelt Hotel.

In January 2010, Aqualillies launched synchronized swimming fitness classes at the Annenberg Community Beach House (among other locations), offering training in basic synchronized swimming skills.

== Performances ==
- 2009: Residency at "Hollywoodland" Party - The Hollywood Roosevelt Hotel
- 2010: New Year's Eve Bash 2010 Hollywood Roosevelt Hotel
- 2010: Kim Kardashian toasts the Emmys Event produced by LA Confidential at The London Hotel West Hollywood
- 2010: Performance for Zync by American Express at the Swim &Style Event Miami for Mercedes-Benz Fashion Week Miami
- 2010: Eva Varro event at Annenberg Community Beach House in support of the Susan G. Komen Foundation
- 2010: First ever Turner Classic Movies Film Festival Tribute to Esther Williams and Betty Garrett before the screening of Neptune's Daughter.
- 2010: Grand Opening of the Hotel Current in Long Beach in support of Aquarium of the Pacific
- 2010: Glacéau Smart Water glass bottle launch party at Sunset Tower Hotel
- 2010: For underwater photo series 'Glass ceiling' by renowned photographer Jill Greenberg Included in The SoFA Gallery / Grunwald Gallery of Art at The Kinsey Institute, Bloomington, Indiana.
- 2011: Justin Timberlake's 30th birthday party at his home.
- 2011: Launch party for Absolut Vodka 'Wild Tea' at The London Hotel
- 2011: Dell Corporate event Hotel Gansevoort New York City
- 2011: Discovery Network event at historic Hotel Shangri-La (Santa Monica)
- 2011: Chambord Event at Hotel Valley Ho in Scottsdale Arizona
- 2011: Hitched Event for all things wedding at Ace Hotel Palm Springs
- 2011: Annenberg Community Beach House First Day of Summer Party
- 2011: Green Screen music video for 'Lillian' by artist Ben Lear
- 2011: Heal the Bay Event featuring Brian Wilson of The Beach Boys at the Jonathan Club in Santa Monica
- 2011: Closing ceremony of TED (Conference) at The Riviera Hotel in Palm Springs
- 2011: D'Amore Swim Fashion Show at The Thompson Hotel Beverly Hills
- 2011: San Diego Magazine Social Buzz party at W Hotel, San Diego
