= Burn After Reading (soundtrack) =

2008 film soundtrack album

Burn After Reading (Original Motion Picture Soundtrack)

Film score by Carter Burwell
- Released: September 16, 2008
- Recorded: 2008
- Studio: Abbey Road Studios, London; The Body Studio, New York City
- Genre: Film score
- Length: 36:10
- Label: Lakeshore
- Producer: Carter Burwell

Carter Burwell chronology
In Bruges (2008)	Burn After Reading (2008)	Twilight (2008)

Burn After Reading (Original Motion Picture Soundtrack) is the film score to the 2008 film Burn After Reading directed by the Coen brothers. The film score is composed by Carter Burwell and released through Lakeshore Records on September 16, 2008.

== Development ==
As with most of his previous collaborations with the Coen brothers, Burwell scored music for Burn After Reading. While the film is intended to an espionage film, there were also numerous genres being a black comedy, amongst others. To balance those genres, Burwell felt that the music cannot afford to say too many things on how the events are unfolding. His first thought, being an effort to avoid any emotional commentary, the score should mostly be percussive which turned out to be true.

The use of percussions provided some sort of sobriety, gravity and bombastic quality to the general silliness and was silently important for the narrative without telling the audiences why it was important. Burwell took inspiration from Jerry Goldsmith's score from Seven Days in May (1964) which also extensively used percussions. The other elements to the film, included Linda Litzke's search for love where the music plays these elements with fair amount of melodrama. Burwell considered this to be a result of trying different approaches and eliminating them, which included removing any excessive melodramatic elements to the score. The album was recorded at the Abbey Road Studios in London.

== Reception ==
Jonathan Broxton of Movie Music UK wrote "it's probably the most un-comedic comedy score you'll ever hear; fortunately, it's also one of Burwell's best, most accessible scores in several years." Christian Clemmensen of Filmtracks wrote "Burn After Reading functions as the unsettling, self-absorbed, and deadly serious treatment of the topic sought by the filmmakers. If you find Burwell's often off-kilter trademarks appealing to your senses, you'll probably embrace it as an engrossing experience. But for the rest of the population, it translates into an extremely arduous 36-minute score album with little redemptive personality." William Ruhlmann of AllMusic wrote "There is no clue to the humor found in the film itself in these brief cues (23 in 36 minutes), but the confused and pathetic nature of the characters is evident, as they are swept unconsciously along by a series of accidental events that lead to intrigue, death, and utter confusion."

Todd McCarthy of Variety described it an "uncustomarily overbearing score". Richard Corliss of Time wrote "the surest laughs came from the portentous percussion in Carter Burwell's wonderful underscoring; it pile-drives an expectation of suspense that the film never delivers". Wendy Ide of The Times wrote "Carter Burwell's brilliant score is the most paranoid piece of film music since Quincy Jones's neurotic soundtrack for The Anderson Tapes". David Ansen of Newsweek wrote "Carter Burwell's ominous thriller-like score is wittily counterintuitive: it never signals that we're watching a comedy".

Lee Marshall of Screen International wrote "Carter Burwell's driving orchestral soundtrack – at times elegaic, at times menacing – also contributes to this tonal counterpoint, setting up echoes with No Country For Old Men – another yarn about bad decisions". Nicolas Rapold of The New York Sun described it an "obliviously bombastic spy-thriller score." Bill Weber of Slant Magazine wrote "Carter Burwell punctuat[es] the score with the booming kettledrums of espionage hokum". Christopher Orr of The Atlantic called it a "dramatic, drum-laden score".

== Track listing ==
No.	Title	Length
1.	"Earth Zoom (In)"	1:21
2.	"A Higher Patriotism"	1:36
3.	"Linda Looks For Love (part 1)"	1:41
4.	"Night Running"	2:27
5.	"Building The Chair"	1:03
6.	"Rendezvous"	0:46
7.	"Opportunity"	1:41
8.	"Plan B"	1:18
9.	"Seating"	2:02
10.	"Homeless"	0:56
11.	"Harry Looks For Love"	0:32
12.	"Breaking and Entering"	3:42
13.	"I Killed A Spook"	1:15
14.	"Honey Nut Cheerios"	0:57
15.	"Who Do You Work For?"	1:45
16.	"Carrots / Shot"	1:04
17.	"Linda Looks For Love (part 2)"	1:20
18.	"Who Are You?"	1:07
19.	"How Is This Possible?"	2:18
20.	"Negativity"	1:00
21.	"The Struggle for Ebullience"	1:35
22.	"Intruder!"	3:22
23.	"Earth Zoom (Out)"	1:22
Total length:		36:10

== For Your Consideration ==
Focus Features released another CD of Burwell's score as a part of the "For Your Consideration" campaign for the 2008–09 film awards season. The album features 30 tracks of Burwell's score, seven more than that of the original track list.

No.	Title	Length
1.	"Earth Zoom (In)"
2.	"We Have To Talk"
3.	"A Higher Patriotism"
4.	"We Were Young"
5.	"Night Running"
6.	"Linda Looks For Love (Part 1)"
7.	"Honey Nut Cheerios"
8.	"Speed Rail"
9.	"Building The Chair"
10.	"Harry Looks For Love"
12.	"Opportunity"
13.	"Linda Looks For Love (Part 2)"
14.	"Rendezvous"
15.	"Plan B"
16.	"Seating"
17.	"Homeless"
18.	"Breaking And Entering"
19.	"Chad Shot"
20.	"Creeping"
21.	"I Killed A Spook"
22.	"Carrots"
23.	"Who Do You Work For?"
24.	"Space Needle"
25.	"How Is This Possible?"
26.	"Negativity"
27.	"The Struggle For Ebullience"
28.	"Who Are You?"
29.	"Intruder!"
30.	"Earth Zoom (Out)"

== Personnel ==
Credits adapted from liner notes:

- Music composer, conductor and producer – Carter Burwell
- Orchestrator – Carter Burwell, Sonny Kompanek
- Orchestra leader – Rose Warren-Green
- Contractor – Isobel Griffiths Ltd.
- Assistant contractor – Lucy Whalley
- Drums – Frank Ricotti, Gary Kettel, Paul Clarvis, Ralph Salmins
- Piano – Dave Hartley
- Recording and mixing – Michael Farrow
- Score editor – Todd Kasow
- Musical assistance – Dean Parker
- Copyist – Vic Fraser
- Layout – Joe Chavez
- A&R – Eric Craig
- Art direction – Stephanie Mente
- Photography – Macall Polay
- Executive producer – Brian McNelis, Skip Williamson
- Music business and legal affairs – Christine Bergren
- Soundtrack manager – Jennifer Towle

== Accolades ==
Award	Date of ceremony	Category	Recipient(s)	Result	Ref.
International Film Music Critics Association Awards	February 18, 2009	Best Original Score for a Comedy Film	Carter Burwell	Won	
World Soundtrack Awards	October 17, 2009	Best Original Score of the Year	Carter Burwell	Nominated	
World Soundtrack Awards	October 17, 2009	Film Composer of the Year	Carter Burwell	Nominated	
