= Adriènne Ferreira =

Brazilian-American model and blogger

Adriènne Dupré Ferreira (born August 16, 1984) is a former model, blogger and music singer-songwriter.

== Career ==
At 14 years old Adriènne Ferreira was signed by Elite Model Management in her hometown, but there was a conflict between castings and school hours. At that time she was attending acting classes in the evenings for a year. She began her professional career as a model in January 2007 in Miami Beach, FL at the age of 22. Appearing in campaigns and over 50 magazines around the world including designer Mario Hernandez, Virgin Mobile, Red Carter Swimwear and walked for Valentino, Asprey, Nicole Miller and Coach. During Miami Fashion Week and Mercedes Benz Fashion Week wore designs from the brands Pistol Panties, Vix Swimwear and Hurley.

Ferreira was featured on Esquire Magazine Turkey as one of the newest rising top models in the world in 2008.

In December 2008 she was chosen by Bridgestone Golf as the co-star of the new RX ball Fan Mail commercials, playing the role of personal assistant of the professional golf player Fred Couples. She has been in every commercial since (a total of six, two of them launched March 2010 also featuring Lee Trevino) and has become an icon in the golf community.

Ferreira lived in her home country until she was 17 years old but was not recognized there until recently.

== Music ==
Ferreira, using the name of Supernova, recorded for the first time in July 2008 a song called Impetus (meaning Impulse), composed and written by an American electronic music artist. The single has reached a few radio stations throughout the U.S. In 2009 she began to record 4 new dance songs for the same producer but they were never fully finished. In January 2010, Ferreira started working on pop/dance project with a new producer and wrote lyrics for 13 new songs.

"I've always wanted to sing, it's something that has been in my heart for a long time. I come from a family of musicians where everyone plays the piano, so music is in my veins. I have been writing poetry since I was little and now I feel like I can put it to use. People inspire me, I love listening to their lives and their stories. I can write a song about anyone, anywhere."

== Personal life ==
Born in the city of São Paulo, Ferreira moved to Florida in the United States in December 2001. She is of French/Portuguese descent from both her parents, Vera Sylvia and Luiz Alfredo. She has two older brothers — Caio and Daniel, both still residing in Brazil. Ferreira is Spiritual and speaks Portuguese and English, Portuguese being her native language. She began competing in equestrian events at age 10 and was forced to stop at age 14 due to an injury to the left arm. Shortly after recovering, Ferreira started playing tennis for a club in the city of Cotia.

She attended two different high schools at Granja Viana, a large district in Cotia. She was a tomboy growing up, building ramps in her neighborhood for aggressive inline skating. With mostly male friends, she would wear large T-shirts, cargo pants and a hat to hide her long hair. At age 5 Ferreira's father taught her how to ride a motorcycle. At 18 years old she acquired her first sports bike and another super sport 4 years later.

Ferreira was first "discovered" at age twenty two by a photographer in South Beach, Florida and gained recognition a year later when she appeared in the 2008 issue of Esquire magazine. Six months later she became Bridgestone's Golf Boom girl for their television commercials and print advertisements.
