= The Finest Hours (soundtrack) =

The Finest Hours (Original Motion Picture Soundtrack)

Film score by Carter Burwell
- Released: January 29, 2016
- Recorded: July–October 2015
- Studio: Eastwood Scoring Stage, Warner Bros. Studios, Burbank; The Body, New York City; Sonic Fuel Studios, El Segundo
- Genre: Film score
- Length: 42:06
- Label: Walt Disney
- Producer: Carter Burwell

Carter Burwell chronology
Anomalisa (2015)	The Finest Hours (2016)	Hail, Caesar! (2016)

The Finest Hours (Original Motion Picture Soundtrack) is the film score soundtrack to the 2016 film The Finest Hours directed by Craig Gillespie. The film score is composed by Carter Burwell with additional music by Philip Klein. Recorded during July–October 2015, at the Eastwood Scoring Stage at Warner Bros. Studios Burbank, the Body at New York City and Sonic Fuel Studios at El Segundo, the score album was released through Walt Disney Records on January 29, 2016.

== Background and production ==
The film's setting and direction were influenced from the 1950s classical Hollywood cinema, which led Burwell to opt for a traditional orchestra over using synth and sampled drums. From the onset, Burwell and Gillespie discussed on approaching the action parts of the score, where the former refrained from gratuitous and bombastic scores written for action films. He and Gillespie chose to keep the instrumentation acoustic rather than digital, hence he amped up with large drums, taikos, and a brass section which was as big as the string section.

When Burwell signed the film in May 2015, the film was pushed from its original October 2015 release to its current January 2016 release, almost overlapping with the Coen Brothers' Hail, Caesar!, which Burwell was already committed to and was scheduled on early February. This led to the two production schedules being "almost on top of each other", and Burwell had to work on this film before its production being completed. To achieve this, Burwell collaborated with his Philip Klein, an arranger who worked on The Twilight Saga: Breaking Dawn – Part 2 (2012). He recorded the score in July 2015, in order to work on Hail, Caesar!

One of the biggest challenges he considered was in the scene, where the motor lifeboat CG 36500, which was dispatched to rescue the crew members of SS Pendleton, crosses the Chatham Harbor and is pummelled by waves. Gillespie was dissatisfied that, neither of Burwell's score nor the temp tracks by music editor Jon Mooney worked for the film. He then dropped more of his score at the final edit, and as a result most of the cues were rewritten by Klein. This resulted in the final score being two-thirds of his original composition and one-third of his amalgamation of his themes with the instrumentation being closer to the contemporary action film score tropes, that matched the temp music. Later, Burwell reworked on some of the cues to the fit the final edit and recorded them in October 2015, while Klein also recorded his replaced cues during the same time, receiving an additional music credit. The accompanying score album also included Burwell's unused cues.

== Reception ==
Pete Simons of Synchrotones wrote "Carter Burwell's "The Finest Hours" is, first and foremost, a lovely score in a way that only Burwell can write them; there's often a sense of understatement or restraint to his music [...] it's a fabulous score; a pleasure to revisit time and again." James Southall of Movie Wave wrote "There is a restraint here at times that, as you might expect, means it's not The Perfect Storm but it's nice to hear Burwell doing something so different and I hope he's not put off trying this sort of film again." Andrew Barker of Variety wrote "Composer Carter Burwell, working in a far more classic idiom here than his recent scores for 'Carol' and 'Anomalisa,' helps craft a very old-school mood". Pete Hammond of Deadline Hollywood wrote "The score by Carter Burwell perfectly complements the visuals". Sheri Linden of The Hollywood Reporter called it a "bombastic score". Marc Savlov of The Austin Chronicle wrote "Carter Burwell's score is particularly thunderous, mirroring the onscreen action". Geoffrey Macnab of The Independent called it "melodramatic". Christopher Gray of Slant Magazine wrote "The only overwrought notes in the film come courtesy of composer Carter Burwell, whose score oversells The Finest Hours's determinedly small-town heroism." Tara Brady of The Irish Times wrote "Carter Burwell's score thunders appropriately along". Negatively, Tasha Robinson of The Verge wrote "Carter Burwell's insistent score crashes down on the film as heavily as the 30-foot waves crash onto Bernie's pathetically dinky rescue ship".

== Track listing ==
No.	Title	Length
1.	"Meeting Miriam"	1:33
2.	"It's Starting to Snow"	2:22
3.	"Pendleton Jump"	1:59
4.	"Split^{[a]}"	0:58
5.	"Lost Our Lights"	1:26
6.	"You Don't Have to Come Back"	2:16
7.	"I Hope You Didn't Kill Us"	1:16
8.	"Volunteers"	1:58
9.	"The 36500"	1:38
10.	"The Bucket Line"	1:47
11.	"The Man Shouldn't Have Sent Them"	1:42
12.	"Crossing the Bar" (composed by Carter Burwell and Philip Klein)	4:30
13.	"Pendleton Push^{[a]}"	2:30
14.	"We're All Alone^{[a]}"	2:22
15.	"Four Men Lost"	1:29
16.	"Rescue" (composed by Carter Burwell and Philip Klein)	5:02
17.	"Big Man, Big Sea^{[a]}"	1:04
18.	"The Going Down^{[a]}"	1:32
19.	"Safe Harbor"	10:20
20.	"Haul Away Joe" (performed by Kodaline)	3:32
Total length:		51:16

Notes

- ^{^[a]} unused score

== Personnel ==
Credits adapted from liner notes:

- Music composer and producer – Carter Burwell
- Additional music – Adam Michalak
- Additional programming – Alexis Grapsas
- Orchestration – Philip Klein, Sonny Kompanek
- Contractor – Peter Rotter
- Recording and mixing – Michael Farrow
- Mastering – Patricia Sullivan
- Music editors – Adam Smalley, Jon Mooney
- Additional music editor – Adam Olmsted
- Assistant engineer – Tom Hardisty
- Booth operator – Alexis Grapsas, Philip R. Klein
- Musical assistance – Dean Parker
- Music preparation – JoAnn Kane Music Service, Josef Zimmerman, Mark Graham
- Music business and legal affairs (Walt Disney Studios Motion Pictures) – Donna Cole-Brulé, Marc Shaw, Scott Holtzman
- Executive in charge of music and soundtracks (Disney Music Group) – Mitchell Leib
- Music production manager (Walt Disney Studios Motion Pictures) – Ryan Hopman

Instruments

- Bass – Christian Kollgaard, Drew D. Dembowski, Edward Meares, Michael Valerio, Nico Carmine Abondolo
- Bassoon – Rose Corrigan
- Cello – Dennis Karmazyn, Eric Byers, George Kim Scholes, Jacob Braun, Paula Hochhalter, Steve Erdody, Timothy Landauer, Timothy E. Loo, Xiaodan Zheng
- Clarinet – Stuart Clark
- Flute – Geraldine Rotella
- Harp – Jo Ann Turovsky, Marcia Dickstein
- Horn – Andrew Bain, Benjamin Jaber, Brad Warnaar, Daniel P. Kelley, David Everson, Jenny L. Kim, Laura Brenes, Mark L. Adams, Phillip Edward Yao, Steven Becknell, Teag Reaves
- Keyboards – Gloria Cheng, Randy Kerber
- Oboe – Lara K. Wickes
- Percussion – Brian Kilgore, Gregory Goodall, John F. Robinson, John Wakefield, Steven Schaeffer, Wade Culbreath
- Trombone – Alexander Iles, William F. Reichenbach, Craig Gosnell, Phillip M. Keen, Steven M. Holtman, William Booth
- Trumpet – Anthony Dilorenzo, Barry Perkins, Christopher Still, David Washburn, James Wilt, Jon Lewis, Thomas Hooten
- Tuba – Doug Tornquist
- Viola – Alma L. Fernandez, Andrew Duckles, Brian Dembow, Darrin McCann, David F. Walther, John Zach Dellinger, Luke A. Maurer, Maria Newman, Matthew Funes, Meredith Crawford, Robert A. Brophy, Shawn Mann
- Violin – Alyssa Park, Amy Hershberger, Ana Landauer, Andrew Bulbrook, Benjamin Jacobson, Bruce Dukov, Charlie Bisharat, Darius Campo, Eun-Mee Ahn, Grace E. Oh, Helen Nightengale, Irina Voloshina, Jessica E. Guideri, Julie Ann Gigante, Katia Popov, Kevin Connolly, Lisa Liu, Lorand Lokuszta, Lorenz Gamma, Luanne Homzy, Maya Magub, Neil E. Samples, Nina Evtuhov, Phillip Levy, Radu Pieptea, Roberto Cani, Roger Wilkie, Sandra M. Cameron, Serena McKinney, Shalini Vijayan, Tamara Hatwan, Tereza L. Stanislav

== Accolades ==
Accolades received by Carol
Award	Date of ceremony	Category	Recipient(s)	Result	Ref(s)
World Soundtrack Academy	October 19, 2016	Film Composer of the Year	Carter Burwell	Won (Note: also for Carol, Anomalisa, The Family Fang, Legend (all 2015) and Hail, Caesar! (2016))	
