= Carol (soundtrack) =

Carol: Original Motion Picture Soundtrack

Soundtrack album by Carter Burwell
- Released: November 20, 2015
- Recorded: 2014–15; Studio X, Seattle; The Body, New York City
- Length: 53:20 (CD)
- Label: Varèse Sarabande
- Producer: Carter Burwell

Carter Burwell chronology
Legend: Original Motion Picture Soundtrack (2015)	Carol: Original Motion Picture Soundtrack (2015)	Anomalisa: Original Motion Picture Soundtrack (2016)

Carol: Original Motion Picture Soundtrack is the soundtrack to the 2015 film Carol. The compact disc includes the original score composed by Carter Burwell, and additional music performed by The Clovers, Billie Holiday, Georgia Gibbs, Les Paul and Mary Ford, and Jo Stafford. It was released in both digital download and compact disc formats by Varèse Sarabande on November 20, 2015. A double album vinyl of the soundtrack was released on June 24, 2016.

== Development ==
Burwell had received the script of Carol before the film began principal photography. Director Todd Haynes sent him six CDs of songs from the 1950s that he and music supervisor Randy Poster had compiled. However, Burwell didn't begin composing the music until Haynes shot and assembled the film. Initially, Burwell considered using two solo instruments, as there were only two main characters and everyone else just passes through. Burwell began recording the track titled "Opening". He stated that composing such a piece first was an odd choice because none of the main characters appear in the opening scene. However, he felt it was important that what he composed induced the mood of the film and the unseen characters. Burwell also wrote several different ideas for this and sent them to Haynes.

Burwell wrote the score with a small ensemble consisting of eight to 17 musicians. The smallest arrangement consisted of string quartets with bass, harp, piano and clarinet. Apart from orchestration and conducting the score, the music was performed by the Seattle Symphony. The whole process, writing, recording and mixing, took about eight weeks for 38 minutes of music. Burwell described the character of Carol (played by Cate Blanchett) as "a cypher" and "a cool, aloof mystery". The instruments he used for her were piano, clarinet and vibe.

According to Burwell, there are three main themes in the score that communicate visual language. The music heard in the opening city scene depicts the "active engagement and passion" of Carol and Therese (played by Rooney Mara), conveying something about the characters before they are seen. This music becomes their love theme. For the theme expressing Therese's fascination with Carol, Burwell introduced a cloud of piano notes. The piano texture "required a little studio magic" with notes played differently by right and left hand; where the notes played by the left hand disappear into a cloud and those played by the right remain distinct enough to carry the melody. This was realized in the scene where Carol drives Therese to her house for the first time. The music appears like a public courtship moving somewhere private and thus the solo notes heard were the delay effects of notes that pile up into a cloud. The third theme is about absence and loss. The theme was expressed in the voice-over scene where Therese reads the letter from Carol explaining herself and the need to hasten back to New York. Burwell wrote open intervals such as the fourth, fifth and ninth, to hide the sentiment. Both women are brokenhearted and the music reflects the emptiness they feel.

== Critical response ==
Nev Pierce of Empire called Burwell's score "sumptuous". Stefan Ellison wrote in The Scene Magazine: "Carter Burwell's score is a beautiful piece, representing Carol and Therese's romance so well and never becoming overbearing, but rather a natural part of the environment." Michael Joyce of Ham&High stated: "The discrete way he underscores emotions is ideal for a tale of a love that dare not speak its name, set in a time when a lid was kept on that kind of thing." In his review for San Francisco Chronicle, Mick LaSalle wrote: "while underscoring [interior] scenes comes the sound of piped-in organ music ... that is just a little bit weird." On Combustible Celluloid, Jeffery M. Anderson commented that the score was "perfect" for the film.

In his review for The Arts Desk, Demetrios Matheou felt that Burwell's score, "reminiscent of Philip Glass's spare but highly emotive piano pieces", sets the mood. Ryan Gilbey of New Statesman magazine noted: "The score by Carter Burwell, laced with a snake charmer's seductiveness, swells and swoops." Andrew O'Hehir at Salon commented: "Carter Burwell's haunting score sets the mood by bridging the seemingly unbridgeable gap between Schubert, Duke Ellington and Philip Glass." In her review for Little White Lies, Sophie Kaufman called the score by Burwell as "yearning". Lewis Bazley of Sky Movies stated: "Carter Burwell's score soothes and soars."

In a series of articles regarding the best of the 2010s in film, IndieWire selected Carter Burwell's score as the second-best of the decade. It was also chosen the fifth out of 40 best film scores of the 21st century.

=== Accolades ===
The score for Carol received nominations from the Academy Awards, Golden Globe Awards, Critics' Choice Movie Awards, and London Film Critics' Circle It won Best Music from the Los Angeles Film Critics Association, the Satellite Award for Best Original Score and Best Score by the International Cinephile Society. In 2016 it won the Public Choice Award for the Best Score of the Year by the World Soundtrack Awards; in addition, Carter Burwell also received the Film Composer of the Year award.

== Track listing ==
All music is composed by Carter Burwell except where noted.

Carol: Original Motion Picture Soundtrack
No.	Title	Writer(s)	Performers	Length
1.	"Opening"			2:15
2.	"Taxi"			1:46
3.	"To Carol's"			1:40
4.	"One Mint Julep"	Rudolph Toombs	The Clovers	2:29
5.	"Datebook"			0:55
6.	"Christmas Trees"			2:21
7.	"Easy Living (Note: "Easy Living" is referenced twice in the plot of the novel The Price of Salt (aka Carol): "[Therese] whistled part of it, and Carol smiled. '"Easy Living,"' Carol said. 'That's an old one.'"; and "Therese played "Easy Living" a couple of times, and Carol sat across the room watching her, sitting on the arm of a chair with her arms folded.")"	Ralph Rainger, Leo Robin	Billie Holiday with Teddy Wilson and His Orchestra	3:05
8.	"The Train"			2:32
9.	"Packing"			1:12
10.	"Drive into Night"			0:54
11.	"Kiss of Fire"	Ángel Villoldo, Lester Allen, Robert Hill	Georgia Gibbs	2:27
12.	"Waterloo"			0:42
13.	"Lovers"			2:42
14.	"Gun"			3:07
15.	"Smoke Rings"	Gene Gifford, Ned Washington	Les Paul & Mary Ford	2:58
16.	"Over There"			1:14
17.	"Visitation"			1:31
18.	"To Court"			1:03
19.	"Letter"			3:27
20.	"No Other Love"	Paul Weston, Bob Rusell	Jo Stafford	3:00
21.	"The Times"			2:18
22.	"Reflections"			1:20
23.	"Crossing"			1:32
24.	"You Belong to Me"	Pee Wee King, Chilton Price, Redd Steward	Helen Foster & The Rovers	2:56
25.	"The End"			3:53
Total length:				53:20

=== Songs and music not featured on soundtrack CD ===
Not featured on the soundtrack but included in the film:

- "A Garden in the Rain" performed by Al Alberts and The Four Aces
- "Deeply" performed by Buddy Stewart
- "Extrovert" performed by Al Lerner
- "Farmers Market" performed by Annie Ross
- "Mullenium" performed by Gerry Mulligan
- "Perdido" performed by Woody Herman
- "Silver Bells" performed by Perry Como
- "Slow Poke" performed by Pee Wee King and His Golden Cowboys
- "Something from a Fool" performed by Jimmy Scott
- "That's the Chance You Take" performed by Eddie Fisher
- "Why Don't You Believe Me" performed by Patti Page

▶ Performed by Vince Giordano & The Nighthawks:

- "Auld Lang Syne"
- "Don't Blame Me"
- "Look for the Silver Lining"
- "Peg o' My Heart"
- "These Foolish Things"
- "Willow Weep for Me"

▶ Rooney Mara performed "Easy Living" on the piano.

=== Vinyl album ===
The vinyl version of the soundtrack is divided into two, double-sided, 10-inch discs: Album One – The Score and Album Two – The Songs, and features three additional song tracks not released on the compact disc: "A Garden in the Rain" performed by The Four Aces featuring Al Alberts, "Slow Poke" performed by Pee Wee King and His Golden West Cowboys, and "Why Don't You Believe Me?" performed by Patti Page.

All music is composed by Carter Burwell on Album One – The Score.

Album One – The Score
No.	Title	Length
1.	"Opening"	2:15
2.	"Taxi"	1:46
3.	"To Carol's"	1:40
4.	"Christmas Trees"	2:21
5.	"Lovers"	2:42
6.	"Visitation"	1:31
7.	"Letter"	3:25
8.	"The Times"	2:18
9.	"Reflections"	1:20
10.	"Crossing"	1:32
11.	"The End"	3:53
Total length:		24:46

Album Two – The Songs
No.	Title	Performers	Length
1.	"One Mint Julep"	The Clovers	2:29
2.	"Easy Living"	Billie Holiday with Teddy Wilson & His Orchestra	3:05
3.	"A Garden in the Rain"	The Four Aces featuring Al Alberts	2:39
4.	"Kiss of Fire"	Georgia Gibbs	2:27
5.	"Smoke Rings"	Les Paul & Mary Ford	2:58
6.	"No Other Love"	Jo Stafford	3:00
7.	"You Belong to Me"	Helen Foster & The Rovers	2:56
8.	"Slow Poke"	Pee Wee King and His Golden West Cowboys	3:04
9.	"Why Don't You Believe Me?"	Patti Page	2:48
Total length:			25:28

== Personnel ==
- Score composed, produced, and orchestrated by Carter Burwell.

=== Technical ===
- Executive producer – Robert Townson
- Music scoring mixer – Michael Farrow
- Contractor – David Sabee
- Copyist – Robert Puff
- Music editor – Todd Kasow
- Composer's assistant – Dean Parker
- Executive music producer – Mark Lo
- Music supervisor – Randall Poster
- Music business and legal executive – Nora Mullally
- Music consultant and clearance executive – Matt Biffa
- Music services – Cutting Edge
- Mastering – Patricia Sullivan

=== Musicians ===
==== String quintet ====
- Violins – Simon James and Gennady Filimonov
- Viola – Mara Gearman
- Cello – Wendy Sutter
- Bass – Jonathan Burnstein

==== Additional instruments ====
- Violin – Brittany Boulding and Misha Shmidt
- Viola – Joseph Gottesman
- Cello – Eric Han
- Piano – Cristina Valdes
- Harp – John Carrington
- Processed piano – Carter Burwell
- Flute – Erin James
- Clarinets – Frank Kowalsky, Jennifer Nelson and Sean Osborn
- Oboe – Chengwen Winnie Lai
- Bassoon – Evan Kuhlmann
- Horn – Mark Robbins

== Charts ==
Chart (2016)	Peak position
Belgian Albums (Ultratop Flanders)	157
Italian Compilation Albums (FIMI)	19

== See also ==
- List of accolades received by Carol (film)
