= The Maze Runner (soundtrack) =

The Maze Runner (Original Motion Picture Soundtrack)

Soundtrack album by John Paesano
- Released: September 16, 2014
- Recorded: 2014
- Venue: Newman Scoring Stage, Twentieth Century Fox Studios
- Genre: Film score
- Length: 62:57
- Label: Sony Classical
- Producer: John Paesano

John Paesano chronology
When the Game Stands Tall (2014)	The Maze Runner (2014)	Daredevil (2015)

The Maze Runner (Original Motion Picture Soundtrack) is the soundtrack to the 2014 dystopian science fiction film of the same name directed by Wes Ball. It consisted of 21 tracks from the film's score produced by John Paesano with a runtime of over an hour. Paesano was involved in the film, much before its production so that he could create the sketches based on the story and further develop the music to suit its visuals. The score resembled the classic Hollywood films and takes inspiration from John Williams' score for fantasy films to mimic the grandeur.

The score premiered exclusively at the MTV website on September 12, 2014, before setting for an official release four days later. Sony Classical Records published the score through digital distribution and in CDs and vinyl LP formats.

== Development ==
Paesano watched Ball's short film Ruin which was presented to the executives of 20th Century Fox; he was also scoring for small-budget films to the studio and which insisted the executives to recruit him for the film. He also composed few cues to be submitted for the production agents. He and Ball were inspired by Steven Spielberg, John Williams and James Cameron's works and the creative vision they share between them were similar, which resulted him to score for music for the film.

After his hiring, Paesano read the novel the film was based on and started composing off the film's script. The main title was the first sketch he had written for the film. Being a fan of Williams and Jerry Goldsmith, headmitted to do an "epic score" for the film even before the production began. The initial score he composed for the footage did not quite fit to the film. Hence he had to mold it to fit the picture, as "the music goes with the spirit of the film". The music was a "throwback to old Hollywood" as it inspires the timeline of that period even though it was fresh for the film, and its budget being smaller than that of the fantasy film productions from major studios he felt "it was amazing what he was able to squeeze in and it stands up with all those other films".

Paesano recalled that before initially scoring a 10-minute suite, he would imagine the story in mind and not the visuals, so that he can have the freedom to write the score he thought of, whereas if the pictures come in his mind he would have to accompany the visuals for the score. Some of the music he composed were inspired from the themes he created on SoundCloud, that are basically stemmed from his imagination.

Paesano admitted that unlike the older times, where film scores take a longer time to be composed, the process had been advanced due to technology, where mainstream composers did not write suites, they instead compose for scene-to-scene during eight weeks and complete the score before the film's release. This felt that they "lose the ability to sit and live with the score and the story for a while and cannot figure out what does work and what doesn't" which leads to an experimentation process trying several things before the actual process. It felt unusual as Paesano was hired even before the production, so that he could visit the sets on person, and absorb the story and the characters. During his visit to the village set on New Orleans, he thought of the "acoustic and environmental sound" on the set, which intended him to record the natural sounds and incorporate it into the score.

Some of the instrumentation included beating big oil drums with sticks, brass, percussions and being incorporated into the orchestral score. The score was recorded for 8–9 days at the Newman Scoring Stage.

== Track listing ==
No.	Title	Length
1.	"The Maze Runner"	2:49
2.	"What is This Place"	3:03
3.	"My Name is Thomas"	3:15
4.	"Ben's Not Right"	2:41
5.	"Banishment"	3:14
6.	"Waiting in the Rain"	1:50
7.	"Into the Rain"	2:36
8.	"Griever!"	2:40
9.	"Going Back In"	2:31
10.	"Why Are We Different?"	2:01
11.	"Chat with Chuck"	2:18
12.	"Section 7"	5:14
13.	"Maze Rearrange"	2:07
14.	"Griever Attack"	3:55
15.	"Trapped"	2:07
16.	"WCKD is Good"	1:56
17.	"Thomas Remembers"	3:35
18.	"Goodbye"	2:08
19.	"Final Fight"	2:43
20.	"WCKD Lab"	5:57
21.	"Finale"	4:17
Total length:		62:57

== Reception ==
James Southall of Movie Wave wrote "The Maze Runner comes really close to being brilliant – almost all of it is well-composed and vibrant, there are interesting ideas and it's refreshingly some distance away from the clueless Remote Control soundalikes that tend to dominate these films today. Paesano knows how to write real music and there's a decent dramatic flow to the whole thing." Writing for Renowned for Sound, Kirsten Maree reviewed it as a "classic horror movie score that will leave you feeling as scared and trapped as its characters" and further called it "cunningly eerie, shamelessly unforgiving and hauntingly beautiful".

Filmtracks.com wrote "Paesano treats many of the character moments in The Maze Runner with comparatively light tones for acoustic guitar and woodwinds, allowing too much contrast between the unbridled explosions of noise in the action material and the needed emotional connections of the softer portions. Also working against him is a very dry mix that sounds shallow at times. His electronically manipulated elements are fine, as is the occasional choral infusion, but the ensemble does have the resounding feeling in the recording that he was seemingly seeking; as such, the whole is a bit flat. Still, this a good starting point for any franchise, and one can hope that the narrative will be clarified in future entries." Pete Simons of Synchrotones called it as a "very solid and enjoyable action-thriller score".

== Accolades ==
List of awards and nominations
Year	Award	Category	Nominee(s)	Result
2014	IFMCA Awards	Best Original Score for an Action/Adventure/Thriller Film	John Paesano	Nominated
2015	World Soundtrack Awards	Public Choice Award	John Paesano	Won

== Credits ==
Credits adapted from CD liner notes.

- Music composer and producer – John Paesano
- Additional music and programming – Braden Kimball, Josh Johnson
- Engineer – Braden Kimball, Matt Ward
- Recording – Tim Lauber, Dennis Sands, Adam Olmstead
- Mixing – Dennis Sands
- Mastering – Patricia Sullivan
- Music editor – Ted Caplan
- Music production supervisor – Rebecca Morellato
- Executive producer – Marty Bowen, Wyck Godfrey
- Music preparation – JoAnn Kane Music Service, Mark Graham
- Booklet editing and design – WLP Ltd.

Instrument

- Bass – Bruce Morgenthaler, Chris Kollgaard, Dave Parmeter, Drew Dembowski, Ian Walker, Mike Valerio, Ed Meares
- Bassoon – Ken Munday, Rose Corrigan
- Cello – Armen Ksajikian, Christina Soule, Dane Little, Erika Duke Kirkpatrick, Kim Scholes, Giovanna Clayton, Joon Sung Jun, Laszlo Mezo, Miguel Martinez, Timothy Landauer, Tim Loo, Trevor Handy, Xiao-Dan Zheng, Steve Erdody
- Choir – Alice Kirwan Murray, Arnold Livingston Geis, Clydene Jackson, Craig Copeland, Diane Freiman-Reynolds, Donna Medine, Edie Lehmann Boddicker, Elin Carlson, Elissa Johnston, Fletcher Sheridan, Gerald White, Joan Beal, Karen Whipple Schnurr, Michael Lichtenauer, Rick Logan, Sally Stevens, Sarah Lynch, Steve Amerson, Teri Koide, Walt Harrah
- Clarinet – Don Foster, Stuart Clark
- EWI, synth – Steve Tavaglione
- Flute – Jenni Olson, Steve Kujala, Heather Clark
- French Horn – Dan Kelley, Danielle Ondarza, Dylan Hart, Jenny Kim, Justin Hageman, Kristy Morrell, Mark Adams (10), Phil Yao, Steve Becknell, Dave Everson
- Guitar – George Doering
- Harp – Katie Kirkpatrick
- Oboe – Lara Wickes, Leslie Reed
- Percussion – Alan Estes, Dan Greco, Wade Culbreath, Bob Zimmitti
- Piano – Randy Kerber
- Timpani – Greg Goodall
- Trombone – Alan Kaplan, Bill Reichenbach, Phil Keen, Steve Holtman, Alex Iles
- Trumpet – Dan Rosenboom, Jim Grinta, Jon Lewis
- Tuba – Doug Tornquist, Gary Hickman
- Viola – Alma Fernandez, Andrew Duckles, Carolyn Riley, Darrin McCann, David Walther, Erik Rynearson, Keith Greene, Marlow Fisher, Matt Funes, Rob Brophy, Shawn Mann, Thomas Diener, Vickie Miskolczy, Brian Dembow
- Violin – Alyssa Park, Bruce Dukov, Darius Campo, Erik Arvinder, Eun Mee Ahn, Grace Oh, Irina Voloshina, Jackie Brand, Joel Pargman, Josefina Vergara, Julie Rogers, Katie Sloan, Katia Popov, Kevin Kumar, Lily Ho Chen, Maia Jasper, Marc Sazer, Natalie Leggett, Neel Hammond, Nina Evtuhov, Paul Henning, Phillip Levy, Radu Pieptea, Sara Parkins, Sarah Thornblade, Songa Lee, Tamara Hatwan, Tereza Stanislav, Yelena Yegoryan, Roger Wilkie
- Woodwind – Steve Tavaglione

Orchestra

- Orchestration – Jason Livesay, John Ashton Thomas, Nolan Livesay, Peter Anthony
- Orchestra conductor – Peter Anthony
- Choir contractor – Edie Lehmann-Boddicker
- Orchestra contractor – Gina Zimmitti
- Concertmaster – Belinda Broughton
- Stage engineer – Denis St. Amand
- Stage manager – Damon Tedesco, Tom Steel

Management

- Business and legal affairs (20th Century Fox) – Tom Cavanaugh
- Music clearance (20th Century Fox) – Ellen Ginsburg
- Licensing (Sony Classical) – Mark Cavell
- Executive in charge of music (20th Century Fox) – Danielle Diego
- Music management (20th Century Fox) – Areli Quirarte
- Product development (Sony Classical) – Klara Korytowska
