= Where the Wild Things Are (score) =

Where the Wild Things Are: Motion Picture Score

Film score by Carter Burwell
- Released: October 13, 2009
- Recorded: Avatar (New York, New York)
- Genre: Film score
- Length: 26:43
- Labels: DGC; Interscope
- Producer: Carter Burwell

Carter Burwell chronology
A Serious Man (2009)	Where the Wild Things Are (2009)	The Blind Side (2009)

Where the Wild Things Are: Motion Picture Score is the soundtrack to the 2009 film Where the Wild Things Are directed by Spike Jonze. The album consisted of the film score composed by Carter Burwell which was released through DGC Records and Interscope Records on October 13, 2009.

== Background and development ==
Where the Wild Things Are is the third collaboration between Spike Jonze and Carter Burwell after Being John Malkovich (1999) and Adaptation (2002). In 2005, when the film was set to begin filming in Australia, Jonze told him that he would not ask him to write music for the film, preferring Karen O of Yeah Yeah Yeahs to write the original songs. During that period, Burwell decided to take a break from film scoring to prioritize his family and chase other interests. However, by the summer of 2007, Jonze asked Burwell to attend a screening for the film to which Burwell agreed. An early edit which consisted of rough cuts and had no special effects was showcased; the edit had Karen's songs playing with other tracks were temped into the score.

Jonze and Burwell discussed the musical situation, as the tone was darker and Karen's songs may not be able to do everything the film needed musically, though Jonze still reinstated on not insisting Burwell to write the score and either would use remixes or rearrangements of Karen's songs as placeholders for the score, something that Jonze's ex-wife Sofia Coppola did for The Virgin Suicides (1999), where the entire film was scored with remixes of Air's themes. However, Jonze asked Burwell to compose themes for which Burwell sent him thematic ideas to which he would respond for. Burwell stated that his music had to match with that of Karen in instrumental and feel, reflecting Max's emotional journey and the overall experiences. The first theme he wrote for the film was "Lost Fur" which was used in early scenes of the film.

While he was working on the score, Warner Bros. planned for a test screening of the film and Burwell insisted to come to the screening, to which the studio declined. He found it to be disappointing, as he actually helped Jonze for the music and he was not officially hired by the studio. But afterwards, Jonze and Warner Bros. fought regarding the type of the film. By 2008, Burwell was hired as the composer. After the film faced numerous edits and rewrites, Jonze, Karen and Burwell spotted the film multiple times noting out who would be responsible for the music in each sequence and auditioning themselves for the roles as composers. Both of them would eventually contribute to the film writing about half of the music.

Burwell noted that Karen has a foreground role, having been part of the even before it was shot and her songs being "outstanding". The score was recorded at Avatar Studios in Manhattan, New York City during April 2009. With an unsophisticated style of composing, Burwell asked the musicians to play the guitar like a fifth grader devoid of vibrato and other techniques.

== Track listing ==
No.	Title	Length
1.	"Lost Fur"	1:09
2.	"Sailing"	2:14
3.	"Follow the Fires"	2:53
4.	"Max Joins"	0:59
5.	"When You Have a Problem"	1:31
6.	"Taming"	3:09
7.	"This Is Your World"	2:06
8.	"Dirt Cloud Fight"	3:25
9.	"I'm Done"	0:37
10.	"Carol's Dark Night"	2:44
11.	"Lost Fur (Reprise)"	1:16
12.	"We Love You So"	4:40
Total length:		26:43

== Reception ==
Manohla Dargis of The New York Times and Joe Morgenstern of The Wall Street Journal considered the score to be "glorious". Brent Simon of Screen International complimented Burwell's score, saying "whether trading in disconsolate howls or more soothing plaintive rhythms [...] the music connects emotionally, and may be singled out for awards consideration." Todd McCarthy of Variety wrote "The alt-rock tenor of the music scoring is refreshing at first, but the predictability of the music cues proves increasingly wearisome."

Kirk Honeycutt of The Hollywood Reporter wrote "A rock-pop score by Karen O and Carter Burwell tries too hard and at too loud a pitch". John Powers of Vogue called it "strikingly original". Lisa Schwarzbaum of Entertainment Weekly wrote "The music, by Karen O and Carter Burwell, haunts." Charlie Jane Anders of Gizmodo described it as a "blaring-loud, wordless score", while Stephanie Zacharek of Salon.com considered it to be "introspective, ghostly melodies". Sukhdev Sandhu of The Daily Telegraph wrote that Burwell and Karen "conjured up a happy-slappy, campfire singalong of a soundtrack".

== Album credits ==
Credits adapted from Burwell's website:

- Original score composed by: Carter Burwell
- Score recorded and mixed by: Mike Farrow
- Score recorded at: Avatar Studios, New York City
- Score mixed at The Body Studio, New York City
- Score mastered by: Bob Ludwig at Gateway Mastering
- Music editor: Todd Kasow, Ren Klyce
- Orchestra contractor: Sandy Park
- Copyist: Tony Finno
- Burwell's assistant: Dean Parker

Musicians

- Guitars: Marc Ribot, Mark Stewart
- Piano: Bill Mays
- Violins: Sharon Yamada, Laura Seaton
- Viola: Robert Rinehart
- Cello: Eileen Moon
- Acoustic and Electric Bass: Greg Cohen
- Harp: Barbara Allen, Tori Drake
- Oboe: Rob Bottil
- Clarinet: Pavel Vinnitsky
- Bassoon: Marc Goldberg
- Other Woodwinds: Dave Weiss
- Percussion: Gordon Gottlieb, David Cossin
- Snare Drum: Washington Duke
- Bass Drum: Chauncey Yearwood

== Accolades ==
Award	Category	Recipient(s) and nominee(s)	Result	Ref.
ASCAP Film and Television Music Awards	Top Box Office Films	Carter Burwell	Won	
BMI Film & TV Awards	Film Music Award	Karen O and Carter Burwell	Won	
Chicago Film Critics Association	Best Original Score	Karen O and Carter Burwell	Nominated	
Critics' Choice Movie Awards	Best Score	Karen O and Carter Burwell	Nominated	
Golden Globe Awards	Best Original Score	Karen O and Carter Burwell	Nominated	
Online Film Critics Society	Best Original Score	Karen O and Carter Burwell	Nominated	
Satellite Awards	Best Original Score	Karen O and Carter Burwell	Nominated	
World Soundtrack Awards	Best Original Score of the Year	Karen O and Carter Burwell	Nominated	
World Soundtrack Awards	Soundtrack Composer of the Year	Carter Burwell also for A Serious Man, The Blind Side (both 2009), Howl and The Kids Are All Right (both 2010)	Nominated	
