= Mesha Kussman =

- Born: San Francisco, California, U.S.
- Education: New York University Tisch School of the Arts
- Occupations: Director, choreographer
- Known for: Founder and artistic director of Aqualillies
- Notable work: Black Is King, Hail, Caesar!, The Marvelous Mrs. Maisel

Mesha Kussman is an American director and choreographer known for her work in film, television, and live performance. She is the founder and artistic director of the water ballet company Aqualillies.

== Early life and education ==
Kussman was born in San Francisco, California. She studied experimental theater at New York University Tisch School of the Arts' Experimental Theater Wing.

== Career ==
After graduating from NYU, Kussman began creating performance-based installation art in New York City. She later moved to Los Angeles and worked as an assistant to director Dennis Dugan and Adam Sandler at Happy Madison Productions. She then pivoted to working with choreographers Rich and Tone Talauega, which reignited her interest in dance and movement-based performance.

=== Aqualillies ===
In 2008, Kussman founded Aqualillies, a performance company combining synchronized swimming with theatrical choreography. Drawing inspiration from vintage Hollywood and contemporary party culture, the company has contributed to a renewed interest in water ballet among modern audiences.

Aqualillies has appeared in a variety of film and television projects, including Black Is King by Beyoncé, the Coen brothers' Hail, Caesar! which features Scarlett Johansson in a water ballet scene, The Marvelous Mrs. Maisel, Glee,, The Drew Barrymore Show, The Flight Attendant, The Late Late Show with James Corden, Jane the Virgin, and Splash on ABC.

The group's performances have also featured in music videos for artists including:

- Justin Bieber & Nicki Minaj – "Beaty and A Beat"
- Sam Smith & Demi Lovato – "I'm Ready"
- Lizzo – "About Damn Time"
- Katy Perry – "Unconditionally"
- Ariana Grande – "Right There"
- Foo Fighters – "Love Dies Young"
- Sigala & Rita Ora – "You For Me"
- New Kids on the Block – "Remix"
- Usher – "Don't Waste My Time"
- Maroon 5 – "Wait"
- Jack Garret – "Breathe Life"
- Trevor Powers – "Playwright"
- Missy Elliott ft. Lamb – "I'm Better"
- Tears for Fears – "Rivers of Mercy"

Aqualillies has performed live at events such as Kim Kardashian's Emmy celebration, TED conferences, Miami Fashion Week, and the Turner Classic Movies Film Festival in tribute to Esther Williams.

The company has collaborated on commercial campaigns with a range of international brands, including Chanel, Disney World Resorts, H&M, Madewell, Malibu Rum, Athleta, Morton Salt, Tarte Cosmetics, and Marc Jacobs.

The New York Times described the company as "poetry in motion," and referred to Kussman as "an unlikely Busby Berkeley." Under her direction, Aqualillies has expanded internationally with teams in the United States, Canada, France, and Australia, presenting work that blends athleticism, choreography, and theatrical design.

=== Choreography ===
Kussman has choreographed for film, television, and commercial projects. Her credits include:

==== Film and television ====
- Hail, Caesar! – Choreographer: Swimming
- The Offer – Choreographer
- The Marvelous Mrs. Maisel – Water Choreographer
- Glee – Aquatic Choreographer
- NewNowNext Awards – Choreographer
- Splash – Choreographer
- Dancing With the Stars – Choreographers' Assistant to Rich and Tone Talauega

==== Music videos ====
- Justin Bieber & Nicki Minaj – "Beauty & A Beat" – Aquatic Choreographer
- Lizzo – "About Damn Time" – Water Choreographer
- Tears for Fears – "Let This Last Forever" – Choreographer
- Rita Ora – "You For Me" – Co-Choreographer
- New Kids on the Block – "Remix" – Creative Director
- See's Candies – Choreographer
- Disney – Art Of Animation – Choreographer
- Sébastien Tellier – "Russian Attractions" – Choreographer
- Benny Benassi – "Let This Last Forever" – Choreographer
- Ludwig Göransson – "So Happy" – Choreographer

=== Directing ===
Kussman has also directed music videos and short films, including By Myself (DanceOn), In The Ring (Cannes Short Corner), Ciara Lea’s "Feel It", and Mot & Krid’s "The New World".

== Artistic vision ==
Through Aqualillies, Kussman has worked to reintroduce synchronized swimming to popular culture, both as performance art and as a fitness trend. Her creative practice explores the intersection of choreography and immersive experience.
