= A Serious Man (soundtrack) =

A Serious Man (Original Motion Picture Soundtrack)

Film score by Carter Burwell
- Released: September 22, 2009
- Recorded: 2009
- Studios: Clinton Recording Studios, New York City
- Genre: Film score
- Length: 33:34
- Label: Lakeshore
- Producer: Carter Burwell

Carter Burwell chronology
Twilight (2008)	A Serious Man (2009)	Where the Wild Things Are (2009)

A Serious Man (Original Motion Picture Soundtrack) is the film score to the 2009 film A Serious Man directed by the Coen brothers. The film score is composed by Carter Burwell and released through Lakeshore Records on September 22, 2009.

== Development ==
The film score is written by Carter Burwell, who had worked with the directors in all of his films, except for O Brother, Where Art Thou? (2000). Like all of the directors' films, A Serious Man takes place in a specific milieu where it revolves within the Jewish suburbs of Minneapolis in 1967. Every attempt to incorporate these elements within the milieu were unsuccessful. Hence, Burwell used a polyrhythmic harp phrase repeating endlessly against various harmonic variations which worked for the film, seeming right for the helplessness of Larry Gopnik (Michael Stuhlbarg) as he dwindles between life and death.

Burwell attempted to use several pieces against the harp motif which did not work. As a result, he composed a piano melody which was in a different meter than the harp piece, and a darker and slowly moving chordal pieces underneath it. He also tried several other instrumentations that bore some relationship to Jewish music but refrained from using violin or clarinet that had resemblance to traditional Jewish music. Hence, he used that harp-piano piece and shown it to the Coens who responded positively. A lengthy scene where Larry adjusts the television antenna on his rooftop runs for three minutes without dialogue, moving its focus to the sound. Considering it as "hypersubjective" on whether the man on his roof looks around the neighbourhood, and the sounds would either come from the ether or antenna, Burwell noted that the sound designer Skip Lievsay came up with those sounds, which was that scene where the piano-harp theme was featured.

The script had specific musical references ranging from Jefferson Airplane, F Troop and Sidor Belarsky and had a Yiddish song liked by the Coens which prompted the musical palette. Three of Jefferson's songs and Belarsky's "Dem Milner's Trern" were included in the soundtrack. The first piece written for the film was actually the piece that bridges the black space between the origin story of Dybbuks and the 1960s Hebrew school where Larry's son Aaron studies. The Coens needed a musical piece that worked against the transition of the old world of the shteti and transitions to darkness to end in a boy's ear canal where he places a portable earpiece playing Jefferson's "Somebody to Love". During that space, Burwell used several instruments such as wind instruments, cowbells, drums, electric guitar and bass, where Burwell used the same models of the bass and guitar which Jefferson used for that song. However, he found it difficult to reduce the sound quality to that of the original recording.

== Track listing ==
No.	Title	Artist(s)	Length
1.	"A Marvel"		1:16
2.	"Knock Knock"		0:52
3.	"Green Lawns"		0:50
4.	"Good Riddance/The Canal"		2:46
5.	"Somebody to Love"	Jefferson Airplane	2:58
6.	"Blue Skies"		0:39
7.	"Rabbi Sting 1"		0:24
8.	"Thirst"		0:48
9.	"Uncertainty"		0:52
10.	"The Roof"		1:42
11.	"Comin' Back to Me"	Jefferson Airplane	5:16
12.	"Rabbi Sting 2"		0:18
13.	"Thinking"		0:31
14.	"The Mentaculus"		1:21
15.	"Seriously"		0:20
16.	"Canada"		2:05
17.	"Today"	Jefferson Airplane	3:02
18.	"Sanctum"		1:05
19.	"A Serious Man"		2:45
20.	"Dem Milner's Trern"	Sidor Belarsky	3:44
Total length:			33:34

== Reception ==
According to Jim Emerson of RogerEbert.com, "the music itself demonstrates a sympathetic understanding of the movie's themes, extending the film into uncanny dimensions." James Leonard of AllMusic called it "a brilliant and wholly successful piece of film music". Matt Goldberg of Collider called it a "melodic-yet-unobtrusive score". Lisa Kennedy of The Denver Post wrote "[Ace composer Carter Burwell's] score taps into the lyrical, the melancholy and — on one potent occasion — unprepares you for a Coen brothers moment."

Abe Fried-Tanzer of Heeb wrote "The magnificent, haunting score by Coen regular Carter Burwell sets a foreboding tone which hovers like a stormy cloud over the whole movie." Claudia Puig of USA Today called it "an evocative score". Ann Hornaday of The Washington Post called it a "delicately layered score, which infuses the enterprise with the taut somberness of a thriller."

== Personnel ==
Credits adapted from liner notes:

- Music composer and producer – Carter Burwell
- Recording and mixing – Michael Farrow
- Score editor – Todd Kasow
- Executive producer – Ethan Coen, Joel Coen, Brian McNelis, Skip Williamson
- Musical assistance – Dean Parker
- Copyist – Dean Parker, Evan Barker, Roy Williams, Tony Finno

Orchestra

- Orchestrator – Carter Burwell
- Contractor – Sandra Park

Instruments

- Bass – Jeremy McCoy, John Patitucci
- Bassoon and contrabassoon – Marc Goldberg, Tom Sefcovic
- Cello – Alan Stepansky, Jeremy Turner, Wei Yu
- Clarinet and bass clarinet – Steve Williamson
- Drums – Shawn Pelton
- Flute, alto flute and piccolo flute – Nadine Asin
- Guitar – Mark Stewart, T Bone Wolk
- Harp – Barbara Allen
- Oboe and English horn – Nathan Hughes
- Percussion – Erik Charlston
- Piano – Ken Bichel
- Viola – Christof Huebner, Dawn Hannay, Robert Rinehart
- Violin – Ann Lehmann, Jeanine Wynton, Joanna Maurer, Sharon Yamada, Soohyun Kwon, Suzanne Ornstein

Management

- Music business and legal affairs for Focus Features – Christine Bergren
- Soundtrack management for Focus Features – Jennifer Towle
- A&R – Eric Craig

Cover artwork

- Art direction – John Bergin, Stephanie Mente
- Layout – Joe Chavez
- Photography – Wilson Webb

== Accolades ==
Award	Category	Recipient(s) and nominee(s)	Result	Ref.
World Soundtrack Awards	Soundtrack Composer of the Year	Carter Burwell also for Where the Wild Things Are, The Blind Side (both 2009), Howl and The Kids Are All Right (both 2010)	Nominated	
