= In Bruges (soundtrack) =

2008 film soundtrack album

In Bruges (Original Motion Picture Soundtrack)

Soundtrack album by Carter Burwell
- Released: 5 February 2008
- Recorded: 2007–2008
- Venues: Angel Recording Studios, London
- Genres: Film score; classical; folk
- Length: 44:08
- Label: Lakeshore
- Producer: Carter Burwell

Carter Burwell chronology
No Country for Old Men (2007)	In Bruges (2008)	Burn After Reading (2008)

In Bruges (Original Motion Picture Soundtrack) is the soundtrack to the 2008 film In Bruges directed by Martin McDonagh. The album featured original score composed by Carter Burwell as well as selections of classical and folk music heard in the film. The album was released through Lakeshore Records on 5 February 2008.

== Background and development ==
In Bruges is Burwell's maiden collaboration with McDonagh who would later score for all of his feature films. The prologue scene of the film which established the context of the story, with voiceovers from Colin Farrell interested Burwell as the spot would be ideal for the music to play the fragility of the characters which was hidden during the first part of the film. The city of Bruges, also served as the real character and antagonist, driving Farrell's character from the beginning to end. Largely, the score maintains a Belgian restraint to distract Farrell's character, until Ralph Fiennes' arrival, thereafter which the score takes a more violent and action turn, the score emphasizes electric guitars. This would play throughout the film, until the climatic portions, as most of the characters are dead, the music settled back into the delicate turn.

One of the logistical problems Burwell faced during the production was the insistence of the distributor Focus Features whose executives demanded to hear synth sketches of all the music before recording. Burwell felt shocked, as he had never heard such a request from a distributor as in most cases, only the directors, who would have approved the score, and not the studio. However, Burwell did not object to it and sent his sketches to Focus' executives. But the production team demanded that they had to postpone the recording so that there would be time for the number of executives to hear the sketches and provide notes to the director.

Because of the said postponement, Burwell lost the large room of recording at the Abbey Road Studios in London and instead had to work in a much smaller studio at the Angel Recording Studios. Afterwards, Focus provided two notes to him, one being the opening cue to be recorded as originally written, dispensing with a darkening of tone, which McDonagh had wanted and the other being the last music, which occurred when all the major characters are deceased, and the studio wanted an optimistic music. Though, McDonagh and Burwell dismissed their decision as absurd. Burwell recalled that Joel Coen, one of his norm collaborators, told him that the independent studios like Focus were more intrusive in the filmmaking process than the major studios; Focus was also producing Joel and Ethan's Burn After Reading and A Serious Man, also being scored by Burwell.

== Reception ==
William Ruhlmann of AllMusic called it "a lovely, imaginative score that gives greater complexity to the mood of the film". Clark Douglas of Movie Music UK wrote "I generally like Burwell's low-key dramatic work, and I generally liked “In Bruges”, too. It's a bit more simple than I might have preferred, and I think that an extra ten minutes of score material wouldn't have hurt anything… but it's not a bad album of music. Recommended for Burwell fans, but not likely to be an essential purchase for most." Marie-Lise Van Wassenhove of Maintitles.net wrote "The music is however enjoyable and catchy, even after a first listening experience. Like Bruges, it plays a specific, guiding role, leading to regret and contemplation, in a very elegant setting."

Claudia Puig of USA Today wrote "The film's score, by one of cinema's best and subtlest composers, Carter Burwell, is a perfect counterpoint to the action." Michael Phillips of Chicago Tribune wrote "Carter Burwell, who works with the Coen brothers, contributes a sad and beautiful little musical score, teasing out the dread and loss in the killers' hurry-up-and-wait circumstance." James Greenberg of The Hollywood Reporter called the music "plaintive". Robert Koehler of Variety said "even the usually reliable and interesting composer Carter Burwell can't effectively pump things up." Elizabeth Quinn of The Guardian wrote "The score by Coen Brothers' favourite Carter Burwell is infused with a wistfulness perfectly attuned to the film's all-pervasive air of melancholy."

== Track listing ==
All music is composed by Carter Burwell, except where noted.

No.	Title	Performer(s)	Length
1.	"Prologue"		1:17
2.	"Medieval Waters"		1:40
3.	"The Little Dead Boy"		1:46
4.	"St. John the Gambler"	Townes Van Zandt	3:03
5.	"The Last Judgement"		1:52
6.	"View from the Tower"		1:04
7.	"My Suicide Your Homicide"		1:38
8.	"Brandy Alexander"	The Walkmen	2:30
9.	"Save the Next Boy"		1:19
10.	"Ray at the Mirror"		1:19
11.	"Walking Bruges"		0:36
12.	"The Magic Frog"		0:50
13.	"Der Leiermann"	Andreas Schmidt and Rudolf Jansen	3:40
14.	"Harry Walks"		1:21
15.	"Dressing for Death"		1:11
16.	"The Kiss Walk Past"		1:04
17.	"On Raglan Road"	The Dubliners	4:15
18.	"Thugs Passing in the Night"		1:13
19.	"Shootout Part 1"		2:10
20.	"When He's Dead"		1:08
21.	"Shootout Part 2"		2:44
22.	"Principles"		1:25
23.	"I Didn't Want to Die"		1:35
24.	"2000 Miles"	The Pretenders	3:38
Total length:			44:08

== Personnel ==
Credits adapted from liner notes:

- Music composer, producer, orchestrator, conductor – Carter Burwell
- Contractor – Isobel Griffiths Ltd.
- Recording and mixing – Michael Farrow
- Mastering – Perry Cunningham
- Score editor – James Bellamy
- Music supervisor – Karen Elliott
- Musical assistance – Dean Parker
- Executive producer – Brian McNelis, Skip Williamson
- Copyist – Jill Streater
- Art direction – Stephanie Mente
- Layout – Lynda Karr
- Photography – Jaap Buitendijk
- A&R – Eric Craig
- Music business and legal affairs – Christine Bergren
- Soundtrack manager – Jennifer Towle

Instruments

- Bass – Chris Lawrence
- Bassoon – Richard Skinner
- Cello – Caroline Dearnley
- Clarinet – Anthony Pike
- Drums – Ian Thomas
- Flute – Philippa Davies
- Guitar – Mitch Dalton
- Harp – Skaila Kanga
- Percussion – Gary Kettel
- Piano – Dave Hartley
- Viola – Peter Lale
- Violin – Ralph De Souza, Rose Warren-Green

== Accolades ==
Accolades received by In Bruges
Award	Date of ceremony	Category	Recipient(s)	Result	Ref(s).
International Cinephile Society	13 February 2009	Best Original Score	Carter Burwell	Nominated	
