= Anomalisa (soundtrack) =

Anomalisa (Original Motion Picture Soundtrack)

Film score by Carter Burwell
- Released: January 1, 2016
- Recorded: 2015
- Genre: Film score
- Length: 43:54
- Label: Lakeshore Records

Carter Burwell chronology
Carol (2015)	Anomalisa (2015)	The Finest Hours (2016)

Anomalisa (Original Motion Picture Soundtrack) is the score album to the 2015 film of the same name, directed by Charlie Kaufman and Duke Johnson based on his 2005 stage play. Carter Burwell, who worked on the stage play's musical score, had composed for the film. Burwell retained most of the musicians played for the stage adaptation working for the film, playing a minimalist score for the film. The soundtrack was released on January 1, 2016, by Lakeshore Records in digital formats, and a limited edition vinyl soundtrack was first released in May 2016, followed by another vinyl edition published by Mondo in August 2017. Burwell's score received critical acclaim.

== Development ==
The film is scored by Carter Burwell, who previously worked with Kaufman on the script of Adaptation (2002) directed by Spike Jonze. Anomalisa was under development in early-2000s, at the same period when Burwell considered to retire from film composing, and asked Kaufman to pitch an idea that would develop for stage readings, which resulted in an eponymous stage play released in 2005. The score for the play consisted of eight musicians playing instruments, including violin, trumpet, cello, guitar, woodwind, bass, percussion, keyboard and a Foley artist. For the film, he created a distinctive music that deviates from the stage play, and had secured six of out the eight musicians from the original play, as "It wasn't a sound play any more. It was suddenly a visual medium so we had to write a lot of new music that had different themes. I could have used more instruments [for the film], but I wanted to keep the handmade nature of the project."

He felt that "the important thing in the music was to really be there with the emotional life of these characters. The music is there to hopefully coax the audience into opening their hearts to these characters who have, although they're puppets, opened their hearts to you." One of the delicate tracks in the film was named as "Fregoli Bar" which Burwell described "You could judge that piece as kitschy, and it is, and there are any number of ways you could dismiss the characters — Lisa [Jennifer Jason Leigh, in a quietly heartbreaking vocal performance] constantly dismisses herself as being boring and unintelligent and ugly. But that's the point of the film, to force you to confront things and people you might dismiss and just go with them and see the beauty in them."

== Reception ==
=== Critical response ===
David Rooney of The Hollywood Reporter described Burwell's music as "gorgeously plaintive". Lee Marshall of Screen International wrote "Carter Burwell's score is a delight, sometimes tuning cheekily into the hotel's own muzak, but in other places underlining the poignancy that is at the heart of a film which, more than Kaufman's previous work, seems to trade chords with Wes Anderson in his more humanistic, least whimsical moments." Chicago Tribune-writer Michael Philips called it as "inspired, empathetic". Variety's Peter Debruge commented "In terms of actual music, it's surprising how little of Burwell's music features into 'Anomalisa,' considering that the play was first staged in concert with a live orchestration. Surely this must be one of the typically melancholy composer's gentlest scores, tinkling away ever so lightly in the background, subtly lifting the spirit of an otherwise heavy piece." Rodrigo Perez of IndieWire wrote "Carter Burwell's beguiling score is clutch, gently persuading out the underlying melancholy of the narrative and lead character."

=== Accolades ===
Following the critical acclaim, film industry insiders predicted Carter Burwell would win double nominations for Academy Award for Best Original Score, along with Carol, and would receive other nominations including Golden Globe, BAFTA and other critics based award ceremonies. However, despite being a contender for the category, it was not shortlisted among the final nominations. Burwell, however was nominated for the Outstanding Achievement for Music in a Feature Production at the 43rd Annie Awards, lost to Michael Giacchino for Inside Out.

== Track list ==
No.	Title	Length
1.	"Overture"	1:41
2.	"Welcome To The Fregoli"	3:35
3.	"Cin Cin City"	1:22
4.	"Another Person"	4:45
5.	"None Of Them Are You" (lyrics by Charlie Kaufman)	4:05
6.	"Fregoli Elevator"	0:55
7.	"Lisa In His Room"	3:53
8.	"Girls Just Want To Have Fun"	3:39
9.	"Anomalisa"	6:57
10.	"Cincinnati Sunrise"	0:38
11.	"My Name Is Lawrence Gill"	4:56
12.	"Breakfast With Lisa"	3:33
13.	"Michael's Speech"	2:35
14.	"Goddess Of Heaven"	1:20
Total length:		43:54

== Vinyl soundtrack ==
The limited edition of the film's soundtrack, pressed in a 180-gram silver disc of 1,000 copies, released on May 2, 2016, by Lakeshore Records. On August 11, 2017, another vinyl edition of the film's soundtrack pressed on black-gram and Cincinnati sunrise vinyl, was published by Mondo, each set for a sale of $30. It is also accompanied by a poster artwork, and a pop-up replica of Michael Stone's hotel room, designed by Alan Haynes.

== Personnel ==
Credits adapted from CD liner notes.

- Bass – Jim Whitney
- Cello – Felix Fan
- Composer, orchestrator, conductor, producer – Carter Burwell
- Contractor – Bohdan Hilash
- Engineer – Angie Teo
- Assistant engineer – Tim Marchiafava
- Executive producer – Brian McNelis, Skip Williamson
- Guitar – Kevin Kuhn
- Keyboards – Matt Herskowitz
- Musical assistance – Dean Parker
- Percussion – John Ferrari
- Trumpet – Brandon Ridenour
- Violin – Conrad Harris
- Woodwind – Bohdan Hilash
