= Hail, Caesar! (soundtrack) =

Hail, Caesar! (Original Motion Picture Soundtrack)

Soundtrack album by Carter Burwell
- Released: February 5, 2016
- Recorded: 2014–2016
- Studio: Sony Scoring Stage, Culver City, California
- Genre: Film score; film soundtrack
- Length: 42:44
- Label: Back Lot Music

Carter Burwell chronology
The Finest Hours (2016)	Hail, Caesar (2016)	The Founder (2017)

Hail, Caesar! (Original Motion Picture Soundtrack) is the soundtrack to the 2016 film Hail, Caesar! directed by Joel and Ethan Coen. The album features an original score composed by Carter Burwell and musical numbers. The soundtrack was released through Back Lot Music on February 5, 2016.

== Development ==
Hail, Caesar! features a film-within-a-film narrative of multiple films from various genres as the film's story takes place in a Hollywood backlot and featured various musical sequences, including a tap dance number. According to Burwell, "the themes that I'm writing for the movie have to relate to the themes of the movies within the movie" and tying all those themes to become the music of a single film, was a challenge. Scoring all the films had led Burwell researched a lot regarding the musical structure and narrative. He studied Miklós Rózsa's scores for Quo Vadis (1951) and Ben-Hur (1959), who felt that he invented his idea of music around the time of common era. The approach for his score needed to have a recurring melody that appear in different guises in the films that threads the storylines even though it appeared in individual subplots of the film. The score was recorded in multiple phases in New York and Los Angeles. Henry Krieger and Willie Reale wrote the original song "No Dames" performed by Channing Tatum.

== Release ==
Back Lot Music, the in-house label of Universal Pictures, announced the soundtrack in December 2015. The album featured 26 tracks, that included musical numbers and was released day-and-date with the film on February 5, 2016 on digital download and physical formats. Mondo released the vinyl edition of the album on May 6, 2016.

== Reception ==
Peter Suderman of Vox wrote that Burwell "gives Hail, Caesar! a vibe that is both contemplative and ironic". Dan Jolin of Empire also complimented Burwell's contribution to the film as one of an "astonishing technical achievement". Charlotte O'Sullivan of Evening Standard stated that "Carter Burwell pushes the envelope with a cracking show tune as well as a typically soulful, bluegrass dirge." Ryan Lambie of Den of Geek wrote "Carter Burwell’s music has a similarly widescreen quality which runs amusingly counter to the movie’s slapstick cynicism". Jake Cole of Slant Magazine described it as "alternately epic and jazzy score".

== Track listing ==
Hail, Caesar! (Original Motion Picture Soundtrack) track listing
No.	Title	Writer(s)	Performer(s)	Length
1.	"Fiat Lux"			1:19
2.	"5Am"			0:57
3.	"Hail Caesar!"			2:56
4.	"Baird Hijacked"			0:38
5.	"Hobie and Whitey"			0:52
6.	"Jonah's Daughter"			2:54
7.	"Comrades Convene"			0:58
8.	"The Cattle Call"	Tex Owens	Eddy Arnold	2:54
9.	"Malibu Safe House"			0:28
10.	"No Dames"	Henry Krieger; Willie Reale	Channing Tatum	4:24
11.	"The Hands of Communists"			0:36
12.	"Little Eddie"			0:39
13.	"Our Father"	Daniel Elder; Nikolaï Kedrov Sr.	Ascention Church Choir (conducted by Feodor Stroganov and Svetlana Serafimovich)	2:05
14.	"Lazy Ol' Moon Overture"			0:32
15.	"Lazy Ol' Moon"			1:13
16.	"The Glory of Love"			2:15
17.	"Song of India"			1:08
18.	"In Pursuit of the Future"			2:04
19.	"Slavery and Suffering"	Traditional	The Red Army Choir	4:14
20.	"Soviet Man"			1:01
21.	"Denizens of the City"			1:02
22.	"Silverman Sax"			0:41
23.	"Faith God Damn It"			2:35
24.	"Back to the Backlot"			0:25
25.	"Behold"			0:52
26.	"Echelons Song"	Alexander Vasilyevich Alexandrov	The Red Army Choir	3:02
Total length:				42:44

== Accolades ==
Accolades for Hail, Caesar! (Original Motion Picture Soundtrack)
Award	Category	Result	Ref.
International Film Music Critics Association	Best Original Score for a Comedy Film	Nominated	
World Soundtrack Awards	Soundtrack Composer of the Year	Won	
