= The Blind Side (soundtrack) =

The Blind Side (Original Motion Picture Soundtrack)

Film score by Carter Burwell
- Released: November 17, 2009
- Recorded: 2009
- Studios: Studio X, Seattle, Washington
- Genre: Film score
- Length: 38:55
- Label: WaterTower Music
- Producer: Carter Burwell

Carter Burwell chronology
Where the Wild Things Are (2009)	The Blind Side (2009)	The Kids Are All Right (2010)

The Blind Side (Original Motion Picture Soundtrack) is the film score to the 2009 film The Blind Side directed by John Lee Hancock, starring Quinton Aaron and Sandra Bullock. The score is composed by Carter Burwell and released through WaterTower Music on November 17, 2009.

== Background ==
The film score is composed by Carter Burwell, who previously worked with Hancock on The Rookie (2002) and The Alamo (2004). Although liking the story, Burwell did not want to immediately work on this film, due to his other commitments and "[his] muse shies away from warm fuzzy feelings". Hancock considered this as a reason to hire him, so that he could keep the feelings unexpressed. Musically, he wanted to compose minimal melodies so that the growth of the characters and their connections develop slowly.

== Reception ==
Filmtracks wrote "Burwell's approach seems to echo John Debney's rejected work for Remember the Titans, though, and at the very least, those techniques suffice." James Christopher Monger of AllMusic called it "a solid score that falls somewhere in between Thomas Newman's work on American Beauty and Rolfe Kent's score for Sideways." Aaron Cutler of Slant Magazine called it as "one of Carter Burwell’s most insipid scores". John Belfuss of California Chronicle wrote "A typically tasteful score from Carter Burwell, who is probably best known for his work on such artful film as Fargo and Kinsey, also helps the film escape the slough of schmaltz." Joe Leydon of Variety and A. O. Scott of The New York Times called the score "inspirational" and "melancholic".

== Track listing ==
No.	Title	Artist(s)	Length
1.	"To Protect His Blind Side"		1:04
2.	"Cello Song"	The Books feat. José González	3:52
3.	"All Things Are Possible / Your Father"		1:40
4.	"Osmosis"		1:10
5.	"Hang Of It"		0:50
6.	"Unsquare Dance"	Dave Brubeck	2:01
7.	"Eviction"		1:01
8.	"Summer Training"		1:34
9.	"Moms"		1:11
10.	"Thank Me Later"		1:47
11.	"Part of the Family"		1:13
12.	"The First Game"		1:13
13.	"Gridiron Machine"		1:30
14.	"Inspired Play"		1:37
15.	"Taming Lions"		1:35
16.	"The Art of Recruiting"		2:21
17.	"The Light Brigade"		2:42
18.	"Michael Graduates"		0:49
19.	"It's Your Life"		1:16
20.	"My Son Michael"		2:04
21.	"Goin' Up the Country"	Canned Heat	2:52
22.	"Chances"	Five for Fighting	3:33
Total length:			38:55

== Additional music ==
The following songs are featured in the film, but not included in the soundtrack:

- "Unsquare Dance" – Dave Brubeck Quartet
- "Cello Song" – The Books
- "That Thang" – Ashley J. Llorens and Mighty Wyte
- "Erik Apologizes (from A Walk to Remember)" – Mervyn Warren
- "Follow Me" – Uncle Kracker
- "Dry No Olives" – Jon Gilutin
- "The Way It Was" – Daniel May
- "Jingle Bells" – Daniel Pinnella, Ric Markmann, Chris Wagner, Dean Butterworth, Tracy Waname and Allan Lanning
- "Catch Me" – Marcella Mortellaro
- "Trouble With Me" – Lucy Woodward
- "Bust a Move" – Young MC
- "Showing Off" – Riverside Community College Marching Band
- "Hype the Crowd" – Riverside Community College Marching Band
- "Charge The Field" – Riverside Community College Marching Band
- "Football Funk" – Ed Hartman
- "Cheerleaders" – John Stary
- "1812 Overture (Finale)" – Zombie Bank
- "Not So Bad Marching Band" – Riverside Community College Marching Band
- "How High the Moon" – Les Paul and Mary Ford
- "Money Ain't a Thang" – Lawrence Edwards
- "Get Crazy" – Zombie Bank featuring Red Ride
- "Going Up the Country" – Canned Heat
- "Chances" – Five for Fighting
- "Southern Voice" – Tim McGraw

== Personnel ==
Credits adapted from liner notes:

- Music composer, producer and orchestrator – Carter Burwell
- Orchestra conductor and contractor – David Sabee
- Performer – Northwest Sinfonia
- Recording and mixing – Mike Farrow
- Mastering – Stephen Marsh
- Score editor – Adam Smalley, Scott Johnson
- Music supervisor – Julia Michels
- Musical assistance – Dean Parker
- Executive producer – Andrew A. Kosove, Broderick Johnson
- Copyist – Robert Puff
- Art direction – Sandeep Sriram
- Music clearances – Christine Bergren
- Music business and legal affairs – Lisa Margolis
- Executive in charge of music – Jason Linn

== Accolades ==
Award	Category	Nominee(s)	Result	Ref.
ASCAP Film and Television Music Awards	Top Box Office Films	Carter Burwell (Note: Also for Where the Wild Things Are.)	Won	
World Soundtrack Awards	Soundtrack Composer of the Year	Carter Burwell (Note: Also for A Serious Man, Howl, The Kids Are All Right, and Where the Wild Things Are.)	Nominated	
