= Christine Sciulli =

American video installation/intervention artist

Christine Sciulli is a New York-based video installation/intervention artist. Her works have been seen on the street, in New York area galleries and institutions. Exhibitions include The Arts Center in St. Petersburg, Florida and New York’s Islip Art Museum.

In 2008, Sciulli exhibited a solo installation with Frederieke Taylor Gallery, had her second solo show with Chi Contemporary Fine Art, exhibited her outdoor video installation, "Everything's Rosie" as part of Plugged-In (Hudson, New York) and was a recipient of a Lower Manhattan Cultural Council Grant to produce a roving outdoor video installation, Intercepting Planes X, in Duane Park (New York). Her collaborations with composers have been shown widely at European and American festivals. A recent collaboration featured her video and light work for the Mabou Mines waterfront piece, “Song for New York: What Women Do While Men Sit Knitting” by Ruth Maleczech, which was developed during her Sundance Institute Theatre Lab Residency at White Oak, Florida. Her 2005 solo show at Chi Contemporary, COVER, was a Village Voice Shortlist Choice: "projections...imbued with fresh, though enigmatic, meaning through intelligently deployed technology (RC BAKER)."

She has been married to musician Carter Burwell since 1999.

== Exhibitions ==
=== Solo ===
- 2019 Phosphene Dreams: Guild Hall Museum, East Hampton
- 2019 SUBSUME: Herron Gallery at Herron School of Art and Design, IUPUI, Indianapolis
- 2016 ROIL, Smack Mellon, Brooklyn, NY
- 2016 Push/Pull Passage, LABspace, Hillsdale, NY
- 2014 Quiet Riot at Duck Creek, Duck Creek Farm, East Hampton, NY
- 2013 Expanding Circles, Central Park Great Lawn, Global Citizen Festival special light installation, NYC
- 2013 The Expansive Field, South Fork Museum of Natural History, Bridgehampton, NY
- 2012 Bonfire on the Hudson, part of Peekskill Project V, December 2012, Peekskill, NY
- 2011 Christine Sciulli: I'm After Me, Edward Hopper House Art Center, Nyack, NY
- 2011 Christine Sciulli: Tangle, Causey Contemporary, Brooklyn, NY
- 2009 planeSPACE, AC Institute [Direct Chapel], New York, NY
- 2008 Intercepting Planes X, Duane Park, New York, NY
- 2008 Intercepting Planes, Frederieke Taylor Gallery, New York, NY

=== Group ===
- 2019 Atmospheric Events, Dalhousie Art Gallery part of Responsive, Light Festival, Halifax, Nova Scotia, Canada
- 2018: Collumina - International Light Art Project Cologne, Hartung
- 2017 Text/ure, Shirley Fiterman Art Center, New York, NY
- 2014 American Academy of Arts and Letters
- 2014 Invitational Exhibition of Visual Arts, New York, NY
- 2013 Artists Choose Artists, Parrish Art Museum, Watermill, New York
- 2013 Fjellerup i Bund + Grund, Curated by Anna Lise Jensen, Thomsen’s Ishus, Fjellerup, Denmark
- 2008 Installation: Intercepting Planes B), Islip Art Museum, curated by Karen Shaw, Islip, New York
- 2008 Plugged-In, (Installation: Everything’s Rosie), curated by Melissa Stafford, Hudson, NY
