= World Soundtrack Award for Best Original Score of the Year =

Annual Belgian music award

The WS Award for Best Original Soundtrack of the Year is one of the three main prizes given by the World Soundtrack Academy to honour the best movie soundtracks.

"†" means that the film won the Academy Award for Best Original Score.

== Winners and nominees ==
- 2001 Amélie (Le fabuleux destin d'Amélie Poulain) – Yann Tiersen
  - A.I. Artificial Intelligence – John Williams
  - Before Night Falls – Carter Burwell
  - Hannibal – Hans Zimmer
  - Moulin Rouge! – Craig Armstrong and Marius De Vries
- 2002 The Lord of the Rings: The Fellowship of the Ring – Howard Shore †
  - Black Hawk Down – Hans Zimmer
  - Monsters, Inc. – Randy Newman
  - Spider-Man – Danny Elfman
  - Star Wars: Episode II – Attack of the Clones – John Williams
- 2003 Frida – Elliot Goldenthal †
  - Catch Me If You Can – John Williams
  - Gangs of New York – Howard Shore
  - The Hours – Philip Glass
  - Road to Perdition – Thomas Newman
- 2004 Cold Mountain – Gabriel Yared
  - Eternal Sunshine of the Spotless Mind – Jon Brion
  - Harry Potter and the Prisoner of Azkaban – John Williams
  - Pirates of the Caribbean: The Curse of the Black Pearl – Klaus Badelt and Hans Zimmer
  - Shrek 2 – Harry Gregson-Williams
- 2005 War of the Worlds – John Williams
  - The Aviator – Howard Shore
  - Batman Begins – James Newton Howard and Hans Zimmer
  - The Bourne Supremacy – John Powell
  - Mar adentro (Sea Inside) – Alejandro Amenábar
- 2006 The Constant Gardener – Alberto Iglesias
  - Brokeback Mountain – Gustavo Santaolalla †
  - King Kong – James Newton Howard
  - Munich – John Williams
  - Pride & Prejudice – Dario Marianelli
- 2007 The Fountain – Clint Mansell
  - Little Miss Sunshine – Mychael Danna; DeVotchKa
  - Notes on a Scandal – Philip Glass
  - Shrek the Third – Harry Gregson-Williams
  - Zodiac – David Shire
- 2008 Atonement – Dario Marianelli †
  - 3:10 to Yuma – Marco Beltrami
  - The Kite Runner – Alberto Iglesias
  - There Will Be Blood – Jonny Greenwood
  - WALL-E – Thomas Newman
- 2009 The Curious Case of Benjamin Button – Alexandre Desplat
  - Burn After Reading – Carter Burwell
  - Frost/Nixon – Hans Zimmer
  - The International – Reinhold Heil, Tom Tykwer & Johnny Klimek
  - Slumdog Millionaire – A. R. Rahman †
- 2010 Fantastic Mr. Fox – Alexandre Desplat
  - Avatar – James Horner
  - Where the Wild Things Are – Carter Burwell & Karen Orzolek
  - A Single Man – Abel Korzeniowski
  - Sherlock Holmes – Hans Zimmer
- 2011 Inception – Hans Zimmer
  - Black Swan – Clint Mansell
  - The King's Speech – Alexandre Desplat
  - The Social Network – Trent Reznor, Atticus Ross †
  - True Grit – Carter Burwell
- 2012 Tinker Tailor Soldier Spy – Alberto Iglesias
  - The Ides of March – Alexandre Desplat
  - Drive – Cliff Martinez
  - Hugo – Howard Shore
  - The Adventures of Tintin: The Secret of the Unicorn – John Williams
- 2013 Life of Pi – Mychael Danna †
  - Anna Karenina – Dario Marianelli
  - The Hobbit: An Unexpected Journey – Howard Shore
  - The Master – Jonny Greenwood
  - Skyfall – Thomas Newman
- 2014 The Grand Budapest Hotel – Alexandre Desplat †
  - Her – Arcade Fire
  - All Is Lost – Alexander Ebert
  - Gravity – Steven Price †
  - 12 Years a Slave – Hans Zimmer
- 2015 Birdman – Antonio Sánchez
  - Cinderella – Patrick Doyle
  - The Imitation Game – Alexandre Desplat
  - Interstellar – Hans Zimmer
  - The Theory of Everything – Jóhann Jóhannsson
