= The Eden Hotel (Santa Monica) =

Hotel in Santa Monica, California, US

The Eden
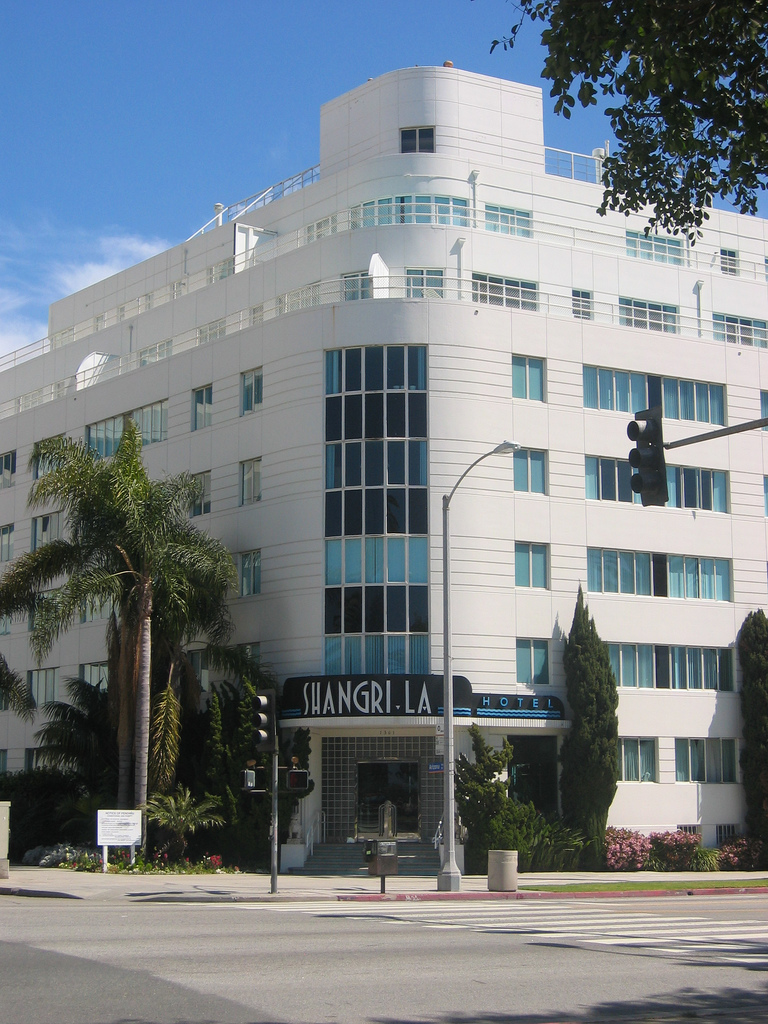

- Location within the Los Angeles metropolitan area Location within California Location within the United States

General information
- Architectural style: Streamline Moderne, Art Deco
- Location: 1301 Ocean Avenue, Santa Monica, California
- Coordinates: 34.015433°N 118.499174°W
- Opened: May 1, 1940

Design and construction
- Architect: William E. Foster

The Eden, known for many years as the Hotel Shangri-La, is a historic boutique hotel located at 1301 Ocean Avenue in Santa Monica, California. It is an example of Streamline Moderne architecture and Art Deco design.

== History ==
The Shangri-La Apartment Hotel opened on May 1, 1940. Designed by William E. Foster, it was constructed by Tulsa-Santa Monica Corporation/F.A. Gillespie & Sons at a cost of $400,000. The building originally had nine double apartments and two bachelor apartments on each of the first five floors, five luxury apartments on the sixth floor, and two penthouses on the seventh floor. It was named for Shangri-La, the setting of the popular 1933 novel Lost Horizon and the 1937 film of the same name.

During World War II, it was used by the United States Army Air Forces as a rehabilitation center.

Business and real estate tycoon Ahmad Adaya purchased the hotel in 1983. His daughter, Pakistani-American businesswoman Tehmina Adaya, took over operation of the property in 2004. The hotel was renovated in 2008, at a cost of $30 million. It was ranked as having one of the top five rooftop bars in Los Angeles in 2013 by The New Zealand Herald.

The hotel was renamed The Beacon in February 2023, when Sonder Hospitality Group assumed management. The hotel closed in May 2025, and reopened in June 2025 as The Eden.

== Design ==
The hotel is an example of Streamline Moderne architecture. Despite its extensive renovation, the hotel's interior design maintains the original design of the Art Deco time period. The hotel has 70 rooms and 30 suites with views of either downtown or the Pacific Ocean.

In May 2009, the Shangri-La was listed by TIME along with five other hotels in their Green Design 100. The hotel utilises many energy saving features, such as a solar powered pool, Natura Green toiletries, low-flow dual flush toilets and an on-site water filtration system.

== Notable guests and events ==
The hotel has hosted many celebrities, including Cyndi Lauper, Diane Keaton, Bill Murray, Matthew Broderick, Bill Clinton, Madonna and Tom Cruise.

It has been a backdrop for the filming of many TV shows, music videos, movies, and other film productions, including:

- Randy Newman's I Love LA music video (1984)
- 90210 Episode with Tiffani Thiessen and Jason Priestley (1998)
- White Men Can't Jump with Wesley Snipes and Woody Harrelson (1992)
- The Net with Sandra Bullock (1995)
- The rockumentary DiG! (2004)
- One Girl's Confession (1953)

Most recently, Melrose Place and reality TV show The Bachelor have featured Hotel Shangri-La.
