= Hail, Caesar! =

2016 film directed by Joel and Ethan Coen

- Theatrical release poster
- Directed by: Joel Coen; Ethan Coen
- Written by: Joel Coen; Ethan Coen
- Produced by: Joel Coen; Ethan Coen; Tim Bevan; Eric Fellner
- Starring: Josh Brolin; George Clooney; Alden Ehrenreich; Ralph Fiennes; Jonah Hill; Scarlett Johansson; Frances McDormand; Tilda Swinton; Channing Tatum
- Narrated by: Michael Gambon
- Cinematography: Roger Deakins
- Edited by: Roderick Jaynes
- Music by: Carter Burwell
- Production companies: Working Title Films; Mike Zoss Productions
- Distributed by: Universal Pictures
- Release dates: February 1, 2016 (Regency Village Theater); February 5, 2016 (United States)
- Running time: 106 minutes
- Countries: United States; United Kingdom
- Language: English
- Budget: $22 million
- Box office: $63.6 million

Hail, Caesar! is a 2016 comedy mystery film written, produced, edited, and directed by the brothers Joel and Ethan Coen. An American-British co-production, the film stars Josh Brolin, George Clooney, Alden Ehrenreich, Ralph Fiennes, Jonah Hill, Scarlett Johansson, Frances McDormand, Tilda Swinton, and Channing Tatum, with Michael Gambon as the narrator. It is a fictional story that follows the real-life studio fixer Eddie Mannix (Brolin), working in the Hollywood film industry in the 1950s, trying to discover what happened to a star actor during the filming of a biblical epic.

First talked about by the Coens in 2004, Hail, Caesar! was originally to take place in the 1920s and follow actors performing a play about ancient Rome. The Coens shelved the idea until late 2013. Principal photography for the film began in November 2014 in Los Angeles, California. The film premiered at the Regency Village Theater in Los Angeles on February 1, 2016, and was theatrically released by Universal Pictures on February 5.

Hail, Caesar! grossed $63 million worldwide on a $22 million budget and received positive reviews from critics. The film was chosen by National Board of Review as one of the top ten films of 2016, and received Production Design nominations at the 89th Academy Awards and 70th British Academy Film Awards.

== Plot ==
In 1951 Hollywood, Eddie Mannix is head of production at Capitol Pictures. His duties as the studio "fixer" find him covering up for its scandalous stars and fending off twin gossip columnists Thora and Thessaly Thacker. All the while, he is weighing a generous job offer from the Lockheed Corporation. When unmarried synchronized swimmer-turned-actress DeeAnna Moran becomes pregnant, Mannix arranges for DeeAnna to place her baby in foster care then discreetly adopt it, preserving her career.

Baird Whitlock, the talented but dim-witted star of the studio's newest major production Hail, Caesar! A Tale of the Christ, is drugged and abducted. He awakens at a meeting of "The Future," a group of blacklisted Communist screenwriters, and is easily won over to their cause. The Future send a ransom note demanding $100,000 for Baird's return, which Mannix procures from the studio. He convinces Thora to withhold a story in exchange for information on singing Western film star Hobie Doyle.

Hobie has been hopelessly miscast in a sophisticated comedy of manners and, despite the efforts of director Laurence Laurentz, cannot overcome his thick Western American accent. When Laurentz requests Hobie's removal, Mannix convinces him to continue his coaching. Hobie admits to Mannix his unease about the role, but Mannix reassures him and confides in him about Baird's kidnapping.

That evening, Hobie attends the premiere of his latest Western with starlet Carlotta Valdez, as arranged by Mannix. The pair are accosted by the Thacker sisters, but Hobie spots the briefcase of ransom money, carried by musical star Burt Gurney. Mannix and DeeAnna meet with surety agent Joseph Silverman, a trusted scapegoat for the studio, who agrees to foster DeeAnna's child. His dependability proves immensely attractive to DeeAnna. Hobie follows Burt to The Future's beach house but finds only Baird inside. The Future have taken Burt to rendezvous with a Soviet submarine and defect to the USSR but lose the briefcase in the ocean. Hobie returns Baird to the studio as police arrive to arrest the group.

Baird spouts his newfound Communist beliefs to Mannix, who slaps Baird and orders him to "go out and be a star" and finish Hail, Caesar! The next morning, Mannix learns that DeeAnna has married Silverman. Mannix declines Lockheed's offer, remaining at Capitol Pictures. Thora tells him that her column will reveal Baird won his role in an earlier picture by having sex with Laurentz, but Mannix threatens to ruin her reputation by publicly naming her source as Burt, a Communist and recent Soviet defector. Thora backs down from running the story and Mannix moves on, confident in his role in life.

== Cast ==
- Josh Brolin as Edward "Eddie" Mannix, a tough but conflicted "fixer" who keeps actors' scandals out of the press.
- George Clooney as Baird Whitlock, a Robert Taylor-type film star.
- Alden Ehrenreich as Hobart "Hobie" Doyle, a singing cowboy in the Gene Autry and Roy Rogers mold who is miscast as an urbane comic lead.
  - Willie Watson provides Hobie's singing voice
- Ralph Fiennes as Laurence Laurentz, an acclaimed European film director, long-time resident in the United States.
- Jonah Hill as Joseph Silverman, a surety agent who works with the studio.
- Scarlett Johansson as DeeAnna Moran, an Esther Williams-type actress who becomes pregnant while her film is in production.
- Frances McDormand as film editor C.C. Calhoun, inspired by female film cutters of the era including Dede Allen or Margaret Booth.
- Tilda Swinton as both Thora Thacker and Thessaly Thacker, feuding identical twin sister gossip columnists, mimicking the rivalry between Hedda Hopper and Louella Parsons.
- Channing Tatum as Burt Gurney, a mysterious Gene Kelly-type actor/dancer. Another of Mannix's clients.
- Max Baker as John Howard Hermann, head of a Communist screenwriters "study group".
- Heather Goldenhersh as Natalie, Mannix's secretary
- Christopher Lambert as Arne Seslum, a Scandinavian filmmaker who is most likely the father of DeeAnna's child.
- Clancy Brown as co-star Gracchus in Hail, Caesar!: A Tale of the Christ
- Ian Blackman as Cuddahy, an agent for Lockheed trying to headhunt Mannix.
- Fred Melamed as Fred, a Communist screenwriter
- John Bluthal as Herbert Marcuse
- Robert Trebor as the producer of Hail, Caesar!
- Geoffrey Cantor as Sid Siegelstein, a Capitol Productions lawyer
- Michael Gambon as the narrator
- Veronica Osorio as Carlotta Valdez, a Carmen Miranda-type actress.
- Alison Pill as Connie Mannix, Eddie Mannix's wife and mother of their two children.
- Fisher Stevens as a Communist screenwriter
- Patrick Fischler as Benedict de Bonaventure, a Communist screenwriter
- David Krumholtz as Herschel, a Communist screenwriter
- Greg Baldwin as Dutch Zweistrong, a Communist screenwriter
- Alex Karpovsky as Mr. Smitrovich, a Communist photographer
- Allan Havey as Protestant Clergyman
- Robert Picardo as Rabbi
- Michael Yama as Arthur, the Maitre’D at the Imperial Gardens Chinese restaurant
- James Austin Johnson as Hobie Doyle’s P.A.
- Natasha Bassett as Gloria DeLamour
- Jon Daly as Cop at French Postcard House
- Mather Zickel as Chunk Mulligan, a stuntman on Hail, Caesar!
- Clement von Franckenstein as Senator Sestimus Amydias, a character in Hail, Caesar!
- Wayne Knight as Lurking Extra, the Communist operative who doses Baird Whitlock's drink to kidnap him
- Kyle Bornheimer as Extras A.D., an assistant director on Hail, Caesar!
- Peter Jason as Director, of Hail, Caesar!
- Emily Beecham as Deirdre / Joan Van Vechten, an actress in Merrily We Dance, who appears as opposite Hobie Doyle in Doyle's debut non-Western film role
- Agyness Deyn as Allegra, an actress in Merrily We Dance
- Jack Huston as Biff, an actor in Merrily We Dance
- Dolph Lundgren (uncredited) as the Soviet submarine commander who brings Burt Gurney to Russia.

== Production ==
=== Development ===
The Coens first pitched the story to George Clooney in 1999 during the shooting of O Brother, Where Art Thou? Ethan Coen described it as a "thought experiment" rather than a viable project. The film was originally going to follow "a troupe of actors in the 1920s putting on a play about ancient Rome", with the focus on a matinée idol. Clooney was to play the main character, who is "a hammy actor with a pencil mustache". In February 2008, the Coens said the film had no script and was only an idea. They pitched it to Clooney as an opportunity to play a "numbskull" following his roles in O Brother, Where Art Thou? (2000), Intolerable Cruelty (2003) and Burn After Reading (2008).

The project was mentioned in a December 2013 interview about Inside Llewyn Davis. Joel Coen said they were working on Hail, Caesar!, and that it would likely be their next project. In May 2014, the Coens reconfirmed the film's development, with the plot now focused on a "fixer" working in the 1950s Hollywood film industry.

=== Historical context ===
Set in 1951, Hail, Caesar! takes place at a transitional time for the film industry. The studio system was breaking down, and a Supreme Court ruling had forced studios to divest their movie theaters. Television, then still in its early years, threatened to pull away audiences. The Cold War and the Red Scare were both under way. Hollywood responded with escapist fare: westerns, highly choreographed dance and aquatic spectacles, and Roman epics with massive casts.

In The Washington Post, Kristen Page-Kirby wrote that nostalgia for Hollywood's golden age is heavily filtered by time. "It's easy to look back at any part of the past and say, 'Yeah, that's how it should be today'. Hail, Caesar! uses the uniformly terrible fake movies within it to show that while we all remember 1946 for stuff like The Yearling and Notorious, it also gave us Tarzan and the Leopard Woman." The Coens cited their own examples of subpar films and performances from the era that they saw as television reruns while growing up: That Touch of Mink (1962), and Laurence Olivier co-starring with Charlton Heston in Khartoum (1966). "We loved that stuff. We just didn't realize we were watching crap", Joel Coen said.

=== Casting ===
In December 2013, the Coens confirmed that Clooney remained involved with the project. In June 2014, Josh Brolin, Channing Tatum, Ralph Fiennes, and Tilda Swinton joined the cast, Universal Pictures was announced to be distributing the film, and Eric Fellner and Tim Bevan signed on to produce the film for Working Title Films. In July, Jonah Hill and Scarlett Johansson entered talks to join the production. The next month, Johansson and Hill were confirmed to have joined the cast, and Alden Ehrenreich entered negotiations to star. In a September 2014 interview with The Daily Beast, Frances McDormand said she had a role in the film. In October, Patrick Fischler, David Krumholtz, and Fisher Stevens joined the cast as Communist screenwriters, and Clancy Brown joined as an actor in the film within a film, also titled Hail, Caesar! The following month, Christopher Lambert was cast as Arne Slessum, a European filmmaker who has an affair with Johannson's character. In a November 2014 interview at the Ottawa Pop Expo, Robert Picardo said he had a role in the film and that he was set to begin filming in December. Also in November, Emily Beecham was said to have a role in the film. Norman Lloyd was considered for the part of philosopher Herbert Marcuse, but claimed that, owing to safety concerns regarding his centenarian age, the role ultimately went to the younger British comedian John Bluthal.

=== Costume design ===
Costume designer Mary Zophres began work 12 weeks ahead of shooting, researching period wardrobe from the late 1940s on the assumption that most people routinely wear clothes purchased over the past few years. She designed for a working film studio of the early 1950s, plus six genre films, each of which featured a major actor working on the set for about a week. Photos from the MGM library and the Academy of Motion Pictures and Sciences showed that film crews dressed more formally than today—no shorts or sneakers. Zophres produced about 15 boards of preliminary sketches, including "sculptural Technicolor gowns" for the ballroom drama inspired by the work of Charles James. Her double-breasted suit for Brolin was intended to blend with his skin tone, his moustache was styled after Walt Disney's, his hair was permed, and his character alone wore a fedora. Zophres modeled Tatum's look on Troy Donahue and Tyrone Power. The costumes in Ben Hur in particular served as references for the gladiator sequences, although Zophres employed the contemporary technique of using painted hard plastic foam instead of metal. The film ultimately required more than 2,500 costumes, including 170 Roman extras, 120 Israelites and about 45 slaves. About 500 of the costumes were custom-made. Toward the end of the shoot, the scope of the project overtook the budget, and Zophres completed some of the sewing herself.

=== Filming and locations ===
In October 2014, Roger Deakins posted on his website that he would be the film's cinematographer and was shooting test footage. Principal photography on the film began in Los Angeles, California, on November 10, 2014. According to the Los Angeles Times, the Coen brothers' decision to film in Los Angeles increased filming activity in the city, which had previously been down by "a double-digit percentage ... in the fourth quarter [of 2014]". In December, Clooney was photographed in full Roman regalia while filming scenes in Downtown Los Angeles.

Tatum dyed his hair blond for his role as a tap-dancing sailor, one of five in the "No Dames!" sequence set in the Swingin' Dinghy bar. Tatum had danced hip-hop and street, not tap, but worked without a double after much training. Other dancers came from Broadway, including Clifton Samuels, who said the scene's greatest challenge was not Christopher Gattelli's choreography per se, but maintaining the style of the period "in which the dancers must stay on the balls of their feet." A split-screen scene from the That's Entertainment! trilogy influenced the Coens' decision to widen the shot to reveal film crew members pushing the set into place.

Hail, Caesar! was the first movie that Deakins shot on film since True Grit in 2010. The Coens themselves had said that their previous movie, Inside Llewyn Davis, would probably be their last use of the medium. But with Hail, Caesar!'s classic Hollywood theme making film an obvious choice, Deakins agreed to give it one more try. "I don't mind", he recalled saying, "I'll shoot it on a cell phone if you like." Ultimately, film proved a limited palette due to the narrowing choices of stocks and processing options in the wake of digital cinematography. Deakins did not recall encountering those kinds of problems on earlier projects. "But it makes me nervous now. I don't want to do that again, frankly. I don't think the infrastructure's there."

Southern California locations were used throughout the film, presenting a challenge to location manager John Panzarella. He noted that "period locations are disappearing fast", including several employed in an earlier film he scouted, the 1997 Oscar-winning L.A. Confidential. The Warner Bros. studio, which has retained its vintage buildings, stood in for most of the fictitious Capitol Pictures Productions after trailers, electrical hookups, and other contemporary fixtures were removed. Union Station in downtown Los Angeles was used for some studio exteriors. The synchronized swimming scene with Johansson was choreographed and directed by Mesha Kussman, and performed by the Aqualillies, a Los Angeles-based group of professional synchronized swimmers. They worked at the water tank on Stage 30 at Sony Pictures Studios; the tank was also used for Esther Williams films and was under restoration until a week before shooting. The wood-paneled conference room where Mannix vets the movie with religious leaders was filmed at the Cravens Estate's drawing room in Pasadena. The office of general counsel Sid Siegelstein was shot at a 1929 building in Los Angeles's Arts District later owned by Southwestern Bag Company. The building was designed by the same architecture firm as UCLA's Royce Hall.

Locations for scenes beyond Capitol Pictures included the Appian Way scenes, shot at the Big Sky Movie Ranch in Simi Valley, and the western sequence, filmed at Vasquez Rocks Natural Area Park. The well of Jehoshaphat sequence was shot at Bronson Canyon, formerly a quarry, in Griffith Park. The nightclub interiors, the scene of Carlotta and Hobie's date, was shot at the Hollywood Palladium, with the exterior at the Fonda Theatre and some reverse shots at the Chapman Plaza in Koreatown. Carlotta's house exterior was filmed at a 1927 home in the Los Feliz section of Los Angeles; this was also the locale for The Good Luck Bar, which stood in for the Imperial Gardens Chinese restaurant. The movie premiere was shot in the Los Angeles Theatre, selected for its spacious lobby.

=== Post-production ===
Digital effects for Hail, Caesar! encompassed three areas: standard effects like Ehrenreich's lasso tricks, period effects including a matte painting of Rome that referenced the 1951 film Quo Vadis, and effects intended to blur the line between a 2016 film and the vintage movie-making techniques it portrays. Examples of the latter include a green screen car sequence made to look as if it employed the older technique of rear projection, and the submarine sequence, which employed computer graphics that suggested the use of miniatures. "It was important that the sub not look silly", said effects supervisor Dan Schrecker, whereas "the whole point of that Rome matte painting was that it was ridiculous". The burning film frame in McDormand's Moviola scene was created by Sam Spreckley, a Scottish visual artist who experiments with the technique. The special effects of the beach house on the bluff were meant as an homage to North by Northwest.

== Music and soundtrack album ==
The soundtrack album for the film, Hail Caesar! (Original Motion Picture Soundtrack), features the original score by Carter Burwell and an original song, "No Dames!", performed by Channing Tatum. Back Lot Music released the film's soundtrack album on digital download and physical formats on February 5, 2016. Burwell also wrote original songs along with Henry Krieger and Willie Reale.

== Release ==
Hail, Caesar! had its world premiere at the Regency Village Theater in Los Angeles on February 1, 2016. The film also screened at the 66th Berlin International Film Festival on February 11, 2016. The film was theatrically released by Universal Pictures in the United Kingdom on March 4, 2016 and in the United States on February 5, 2016. Universal Home Entertainment released Hail, Caesar! on DVD and Blu-ray on June 7, 2016, in the United Kingdom and the United States.

== Reception ==
=== Box office ===
Hail, Caesar! grossed $30.1 million in the United States and Canada, and $33.1 million in other countries, for a worldwide total of $63.2 million against a production budget of $22 million.

The film was released in North America on February 5, 2016, alongside Pride and Prejudice and Zombies and The Choice, and was projected to gross $9–11 million from 2,231 theaters in its opening weekend. Hail, Caesar! made $4.3 million on its first day (including $543,000 from Thursday night previews). The film went on to gross $11.4 million in its opening weekend, finishing second at the box office behind Kung Fu Panda 3 ($21.2 million). In its second weekend, it grossed $6.4 million (a 44% drop), finishing 6th at the box office.

=== Critical response ===
On Rotten Tomatoes, the film holds an approval rating of 86% based on 361 reviews, with an average rating of 7.2/10. The website's critical consensus reads, "Packed with period detail and perfectly cast, Hail, Caesar! finds the Coen brothers delivering an agreeably lightweight love letter to post-war Hollywood." On Metacritic the film has a weighted average score of 72 out of 100, based on 50 critics, indicating "generally favorable" reviews.

The New Yorker's Richard Brody called the film "a comedy, and a scintillating, uproarious one, filled with fast and light touches of exquisite incongruity in scenes that have the expansiveness of relaxed precision, performed and timed with the spontaneous authority of jazz." In the Los Angeles Times, Kenneth Turan called the film a "droll tribute to and spoof of Hollywood past [that] amuses from beginning to end with its site specific re-creation of the studio system and the movies that made it famous." The Coens were "helped enormously by a splendid and committed ensemble cast."

John Anderson of The Wall Street Journal wrote: "A dispiritingly vitriolic, only sporadically funny satire of '50s Hollywood, Hail, Caesar! verifies a suspicion long held here, that the Coen brothers, Joel and Ethan, really hate the movies. Their central character, Eddie Mannix...is being wooed by Lockheed. Better hours. Better pay. Lifetime employment. Fewer nut jobs. And work that wouldn't be quite so... frivolous. The movie makes a strong case that the Coen brothers feel the same way. You start to wonder why you're sitting there watching."

The Atlantic associate editor David Sims concluded the opposite. Coen protagonists, he wrote, sometimes ask questions of higher powers—and receive no answer. "In Hail, Caesar! the answer is given, and it's as hopeful as one could expect from the Coens: Cinema's somber, weighty moments matter, but equally crucial are the frivolous, joyful bits of entertainment—watching Channing Tatum tap-dance on a table, or George Clooney ramble overwritten monologues."

Manohla Dargis of The New York Times wrote that Hail, Caesar! falls between the filmmakers' masterworks and duds. "It's a typically sly, off-center comedy, once again set against the machinery of the motion-picture business. And, as usual with the Coens, it has more going on than there might seem, including in its wrangling over God and ideology, art and entertainment."

Richard Roeper gave the film four out of four stars, calling it one of his favorite movies ever made about making movies. IGN gave the film 7.7/10, saying, "Hail, Caesar! may not be one of the Coen Brothers' finest efforts—and it might not engage viewers beyond Los Angeles or those who truly understand or work in the film industry—but it's nevertheless a fun, charming, and oft-hilarious take on Hollywood's Golden Age." In The Village Voice, Melissa Anderson praised the performances, but found that the tone and humor of the film "too often goes flat."

=== Audience response ===
Audiences polled by CinemaScore gave the film an average grade of "C−" on an A+ to F scale. 52% of the opening day audience were males while 84% were over 25, with both demographics giving the film a "D+" grade, while those over 50 years old gave the film a grade of "D−". Filmgoers polled by comScore's PostTrak service gave the film a 66% overall positive score and just a 40% "definite recommend".

=== Accolades ===
List of awards and nominations
Award	Date of ceremony	Category	Recipient(s)	Result	Ref.
Academy Awards	February 26, 2017	Best Production Design	Jess Gonchor and Nancy Haigh	Nominated	
ACE Eddie Awards	January 27, 2017	Best Edited Feature Film – Comedy or Musical	Roderick Jaynes	Nominated	
Art Directors Guild Awards	February 11, 2017	Excellence in Production Design for a Period Film	Jess Gonchor	Nominated	
British Academy Film Awards	February 12, 2017	Best Production Design	Jess Gonchor and Nancy Haigh	Nominated	
Chicago Film Critics Association	December 15, 2016	Best Supporting Actor	Alden Ehrenreich	Nominated	
Costume Designers Guild	February 21, 2017	Excellence in Period Film	Mary Zophres	Nominated	
Critics' Choice Awards	December 11, 2016	Best Comedy	Hail, Caesar!	Nominated	
Denver Film Critics Society	January 16, 2017	Best Comedy	Hail, Caesar!	Nominated	
Detroit Film Critics Society	December 19, 2016	Best Supporting Actor	Alden Ehrenreich	Nominated	
Location Managers Guild Awards	April 8, 2017	Outstanding Locations in a Period Film	John Panzarella, Leslie Thorson	Nominated	
Make-Up Artists and Hair Stylists Guild	February 19, 2017	Feature-Length Motion Picture – Period and/or Character Make-Up	Jean Ann Black, Zoe Hay and Julie Hewett	Nominated	
Make-Up Artists and Hair Stylists Guild	February 19, 2017	Feature-Length Motion Picture – Period and/or Character Hair Styling	Cydney Cornell, Matt Danon and Pauletta Lewis-Irwin	Won	
San Diego Film Critics Society	December 12, 2016	Best Comedy Performance	Alden Ehrenreich	Nominated	
San Diego Film Critics Society	December 12, 2016	Best Production Design	Jess Gonchor	Won	
San Diego Film Critics Society	December 12, 2016	Breakthrough Artist	Alden Ehrenreich	Nominated	
St. Louis Film Critics Association	December 18, 2016	Best Cinematography	Roger Deakins	Nominated	
St. Louis Film Critics Association	December 18, 2016	Best Production Design	Jess Gonchor	Nominated	
St. Louis Film Critics Association	December 18, 2016	Best Comedy	Hail, Caesar!	Won	
St. Louis Film Critics Association	December 18, 2016	Best Scene	"Would that it were so simple."	Nominated	
