= World Soundtrack Award – Public Choice =

Annual event since 2001

The Public Choice Award for the Best Score of the Year is an award by the World Soundtrack Academy. Each year, the general public votes for the nominees and the award is presented at the annual World Soundtrack Awards.

== History ==
The category has existed since 2001.

In 2016, the International Film Music Critics Association partnered with WSA in choosing the shortlist of nominees, selecting 30 scores representing the most outstanding works. The five nominees receiving the most votes became the final candidates for the award, with the winner announced at the awards gala.

== Winners ==
- 2001: Artificial Intelligence: A.I. – John Williams
- 2002: The Lord of the Rings: The Fellowship of the Ring – Howard Shore
- 2003: The Lord of the Rings: The Two Towers – Howard Shore
- 2004: Harry Potter and the Prisoner of Azkaban – John Williams
- 2005: Alexander – Vangelis
- 2006: Brokeback Mountain – Gustavo Santaolalla
- 2007: The Fountain – Clint Mansell
- 2008: Aanrijding in Moscou – Tuur Florizoone
- 2009: Twilight – Carter Burwell
- 2010: A Single Man – Abel Korzeniowski
- 2011: 127 Hours – A. R. Rahman
- 2012: W.E. – Abel Korzeniowski
- 2013: The Butterfly's Dream – Rahman Altin
- 2014: Marina – Michelino Bisceglia
- 2015: The Maze Runner – John Paesano
- 2016: Carol – Carter Burwell
- 2017: Viceroy's House – A.R. Rahman
- 2018: Nostalgia – Eyquem Laurent
- 2019: How to Train Your Dragon: The Hidden World – John Powell
- 2020: Klaus – Alfonso G. Aguilar
- 2021: SAS: Red Notice – Benji Merrison
- 2022: The King's Daughter – Joseph Metcalfe, John Coda, and Grant Kirkhope
- 2023: Mr. Malcolm's List – Amelia Warner
- 2024: La Guerra dei Nonni – Umberto Scipione
- 2025: Hola Frida! – Laetitia Pansanel-Garric
- 2026: I Am Frankelda – Kevin Smithers

== Multiple wins (2 or more) ==
- Howard Shore - 2
- John Williams - 2
- Carter Burwell - 2
- Abel Korzeniowski - 2
- A.R. Rahman - 2
