= Mercedes-Benz Fashion Week Miami =

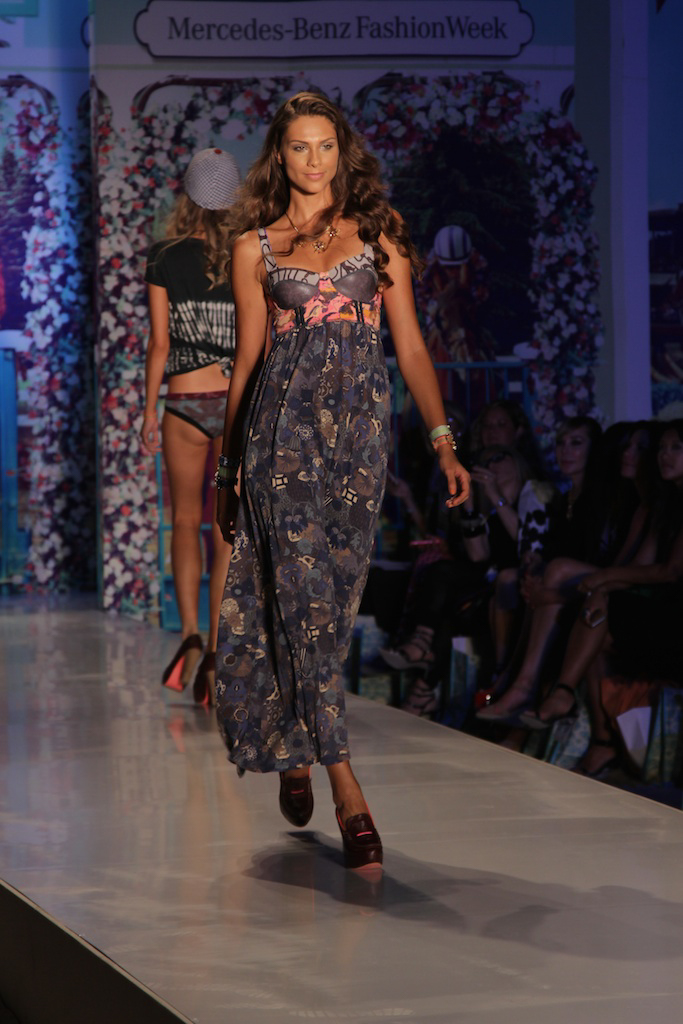
Fashion model walks the runway during the Maaji Swimwear fashion show at the Mercedes Benz Fashion Week

Mercedes-Benz Fashion Week Miami is an annual fashion week held in Miami, Florida, United States. Mercedes-Benz Fashion Week Miami, not to be confused with Miami Fashion Week, is held every year during the Summer at the Raleigh Hotel at 1775 Collins Avenue in South Beach, Miami Beach. Mercedes-Benz Fashion Week Miami works together with New York Fashion Week, and is the country's largest, and most important fashion week for swimwear. IMG whom first brought its runway event to South Beach in 2004, had an ongoing partnership with Mercedes-Benz. However, due to changes in ownership, as IMG was acquired by William Morris Endeavor and Silver Lake Partners in a $2.2 billion deal, the agency lost Mercedes-Benz as a title sponsor. The show was cancelled for 2015 but will resume in 2016 after re-branding the popular event.
