= Miami Fashion Week =

Annual fashion week in Miami, Florida, U.S.

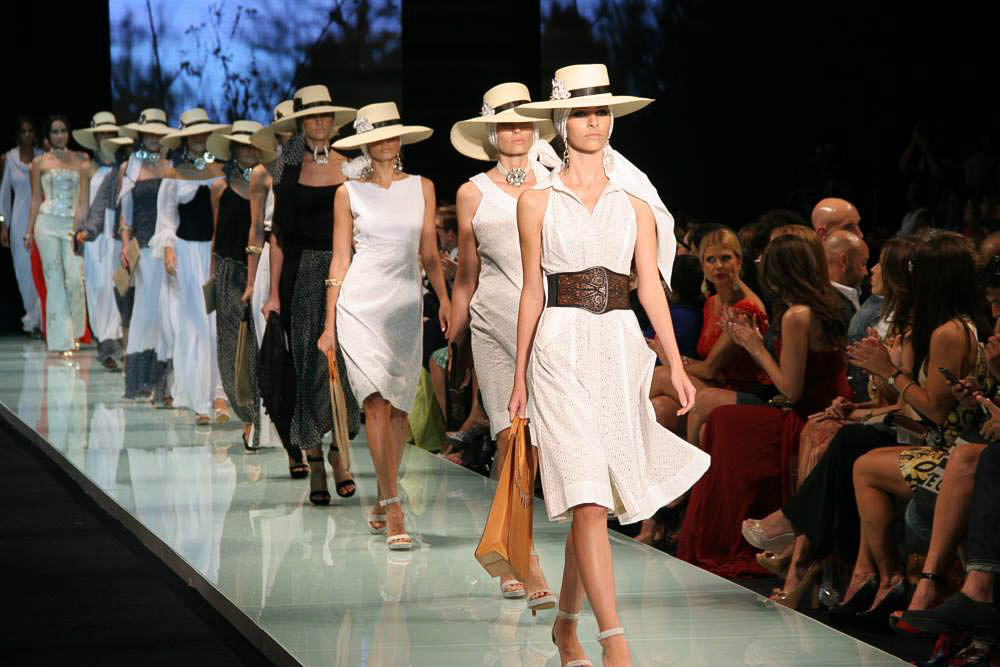
Models walk down the runway for the final walk through in a fashion show wearing designs by Claudia Bertolero during the Miami Fashion Week

Miami Fashion Week (MIAFW) is an annual fashion week held in Miami, Florida, United States. Miami Fashion Week, not to be confused with the Mercedes-Benz Fashion Week Miami or Miami Swim Week, takes place every year the first week of June. Miami Fashion Week was started in 1998 and is the world's largest fashion week for Latin American and the Caribbean fashion designers.

== Relaunch ==
In May 2015 the company was acquired by The Fashion Shows, LLC and developed an innovative strategic relaunching plan. Miami Fashion Week since 2016 has been considered the second largest fashion event in the United States. The brand then welcomed Antonio Banderas as its Honorary President.

Following the relaunch of Miami Fashion Week, the brand had a clear focus on debuting resort collections of established and emerging international designers. Even with the focus on international designers, Miami Fashion Week has been dedicated to cultivating the fashion industry in Miami. Miami's diverse connection between Latin America and the United States encourages the development of Miami's ever-growing artists and designers.

== 2019 Fashion Week ==
From May 29 to June 2, 2019, Miami Fashion Week was place. Events were held at various locations in Miami, including the EPIC Hotel, Saks Fifth Avenue Brickell, Chotto Matte, and Seaspice. On the Wolfson Campus of Miami Dade College, information summits were conducted, and Ice Palace Film Studios hosted runway shows.

Premium sponsors of MIAFW 2019 included PORCELANOSA, builders of this year's runway, Lexus, and EPIC Hotel, the official hotel partner for MIAFW 2019. Other sponsors included Univisión, E! Entertainment, Miami International Airport, and Bo Concept.

Exclusive resort collections for the 2020 season were debuted from designers Ágatha Ruiz de la Prada, RR by Rene, Fernando Alberto Atelier, Daniella Batlle, Glory Ang, Vero Diaz, Herminas Reea, and others. As part of this year's events, the Dominican Republic was a guest country and featured an exclusive runway show with acclaimed designers Giannina Azar, Jenny Polanco, Arcadio Díaz, Jacqueline Then, and Monica Varela.
