= Carter Burwell =

American film composer (born 1954)

- Born: Carter Benedict Burwell; November 18, 1954 (age 71); New York City, U.S.
- Occupation: Film composer
- Instrument: Keyboards
- Years active: 1984–present
- Website: carterburwell.com

Carter Benedict Burwell (born November 18, 1954) is an American film composer. He received Academy Award nominations for Best Original Score for Todd Haynes's Carol (2015) and Martin McDonagh's films Three Billboards Outside Ebbing, Missouri (2017) and The Banshees Of Inisherin (2022). He has frequently collaborated with the Coen brothers, having scored most of their films. He has also scored films by other directors such as Bill Condon, Spike Jonze, James Foley, Brian Helgeland, and John Lee Hancock.

== Early life and education ==
Burwell was born in New York City, the son of Natalie (née Benedict), a math teacher, and Charles Burwell, who founded Thaibok Fabrics, Ltd. He graduated from King School in Stamford, Connecticut with George Hofecker and other notables and Harvard College, where he was a cartoonist for The Harvard Lampoon.

== Career ==
As a film composer, Burwell has had a long-working relationship with the Coen brothers, providing music for every film they have made (except for Inside Llewyn Davis and O Brother, Where Art Thou?). Among his best known film scores are Miller's Crossing (1990), And the Band Played On (1993), Conspiracy Theory (1997), Hamlet (2000), The Spanish Prisoner (1997), Before the Devil Knows You're Dead (2007), In Bruges (2008), Twilight (2008), Where the Wild Things Are (2009), The Blind Side (2009), and Breaking Dawn - Part 1 (2011) and Part 2 (2012). Burwell wrote and recorded the original score for the film The Bourne Identity, but director Doug Liman wanted something else and replaced it with a score by John Powell.

The ethos of the punk rock movement gave Burwell the impetus to start performing. He performed in New York with several bands, notably The Same, Thick Pigeon, and Radiante. Burwell played in Thick Pigeon with Stanton Miranda; the group released two albums, Too Crazy Cowboys (Factory) and tracks on Miranda Dali (Crepuscule), originally released as a Miranda solo project but later reissued as a Thick Pigeon release. On Burwell's soundtrack for Psycho III, Miranda was a featured singer.

By 1986 he had composed the music for a dance piece, RAB, which premiered at the Avignon Festival. At the same time, he was touring worldwide with The Harmonic Choir, David Hykes' experimental vocal group, which specialized in overtone singing.

Burwell used the country music genre as the basis for his score for the Coens' Raising Arizona in 1987. From 1982 to 1987 he worked at the New York Institute of Technology.

His work has alternated between live performance, dance and theater commissions, and film scoring. His chamber opera, The Celestial Alphabet Event, was presented in New York in 1991, and other theater pieces include Mother (1994) and Lucia's Chapters (2007), both with the experimental theater group Mabou Mines.

In April 2005, Burwell composed and conducted music performed by The Parabola Ensemble for the plays Sawbones, written and directed by the Coen brothers, Hope Leaves the Theater, written and directed by Charlie Kaufman, and Anomalisa, written and directed by Kaufman as Francis Fregoli. This was a segment of the sound-only production "Theater of the New Ear", which debuted at St. Ann's Warehouse in Brooklyn, New York, with support from Sirius Satellite Radio. It was also performed at the Royal Festival Hall in London, England, in May 2005, and at Royce Hall in Los Angeles, California, in September 2005, as part of the UCLA Live Festival.

In 2009, Burwell was the recipient of the ASCAP Henry Mancini Award from the American Society of Composers, Authors and Publishers. In 2010, he was nominated for the Golden Globe Award for Best Original Score for Where the Wild Things Are.

In 2015, he received the Distinguished Film Composer award from the Middleburg Film Festival, and the Los Angeles Film Critics Association award for Best Music Score for Anomalisa and Carol. He was nominated for the Annie Award for Music in an Animated Feature Production for Anomalisa and the Golden Globe Award for Best Original Score for Carol. In 2016, he received the Satellite Award for Best Original Score and the Best Score award by the International Cinephile Society for Carol. Burwell was awarded Film Composer of the Year by the World Soundtrack Awards, and the score for Carol received the Public Choice Award for the Best Score of the Year.

Burwell received his first Academy Award for Best Original Score nomination for Carol, his second for Three Billboards Outside Ebbing, Missouri, and his third for The Banshees Of Inisherin.

== Personal life ==
Burwell married Christine Sciulli in 1999.

Since 2009, Burwell has lived in Napeague, New York.

== Filmography ==
=== Film ===
Year	Title	Director	Notes
1984	Blood Simple	Joel and Ethan Coen	
1985	A Hero of Our Time	Michael Almereyda	Short film
1985	R.A.B.L.	Patrice M. Regnier	Short film
1986	Psycho III	Anthony Perkins	
1987	Raising Arizona	Joel and Ethan Coen	
1987	Pass the Ammo	David Beaird	
1987	The Beat	Paul Mones	
1988	It Takes Two	David Beaird	
1988	Checking Out	David Leland	
1990	Miller's Crossing	Joel and Ethan Coen	
1991	Barton Fink	Joel and Ethan Coen	
1991	Doc Hollywood	Michael Caton-Jones	
1991	Scorchers	David Beaird	
1992	Buffy the Vampire Slayer	Fran Rubel Kuzui	
1992	Waterland	Stephen Gyllenhaal	
1992	Storyville	Mark Frost	
1993	This Boy's Life	Michael Caton-Jones	
1993	Kalifornia	Dominic Sena	
1993	A Dangerous Woman	Stephen Gyllenhaal	
1993	Wayne's World 2	Stephen Surjik	
1994	The Hudsucker Proxy	Joel and Ethan Coen	
1994	It Could Happen to You	Andrew Bergman	
1994	Airheads	Michael Lehmann	Replaced David Newman
1995	Bad Company	Damian Harris	
1995	A Goofy Movie	Kevin Lima	First score for an animated film
1995	Rob Roy	Michael Caton-Jones	
1995	The Celluloid Closet	Rob Epstein; Jeffrey Friedman	Documentary film
1995	Two Bits	James Foley	
1996	Fargo	Joel and Ethan Coen	
1996	Fear	James Foley	
1996	Joe's Apartment	John Payson	
1996	The Chamber	James Foley	
1997	Picture Perfect	Glenn Gordon Caron	
1997	Assassin(s)	Mathieu Kassovitz	
1997	Conspiracy Theory	Richard Donner	
1997	The Locusts	John Patrick Kelley	
1997	The Spanish Prisoner	David Mamet	
1997	Girls Night Out	Myra Paci	Short film
1997	The Jackal	Michael Caton-Jones	
1998	Gods and Monsters	Bill Condon	
1998	Mercury Rising	Harold Becker	Replaced portions of John Barry's score
1998	The Big Lebowski	Joel and Ethan Coen	
1998	Velvet Goldmine	Todd Haynes	
1998	The Hi-Lo Country	Stephen Frears	
1999	The Corruptor	James Foley	
1999	The General's Daughter	Simon West	
1999	Being John Malkovich	Spike Jonze	
1999	Three Kings	David O. Russell	
1999	Mystery, Alaska	Jay Roach	
2000	Hamlet	Michael Almereyda	
2000	What Planet Are You From?	Mike Nichols	
2000	O Brother, Where Art Thou?	Joel and Ethan Coen	Additional music only
2000	Before Night Falls	Julian Schnabel	
2000	Book of Shadows: Blair Witch 2	Joe Berlinger	
2001	A Knight's Tale	Brian Helgeland	
2001	The Man Who Wasn't There	Joel and Ethan Coen	
2002	The Rookie	John Lee Hancock	
2002	Searching for Paradise	Myra Paci	
2002	Simone	Andrew Niccol	
2002	Adaptation	Spike Jonze	
2003	Intolerable Cruelty	Joel and Ethan Coen	
2004	The Ladykillers	Joel and Ethan Coen	
2004	The Alamo	John Lee Hancock	
2004	Kinsey	Bill Condon	
2006	Fur	Steven Shainberg	
2006	The Hoax	Lasse Hallström	
2007	No Country for Old Men	Joel and Ethan Coen	
2007	Before the Devil Knows You're Dead	Sidney Lumet	
2008	In Bruges	Martin McDonagh	
2008	Burn After Reading	Joel and Ethan Coen	
2008	Twilight	Catherine Hardwicke	
2009	A Serious Man	Joel and Ethan Coen	
2009	Where the Wild Things Are	Spike Jonze	Co-composed with Karen O
2009	The Blind Side	John Lee Hancock	
2010	Howl	Rob Epstein; Jeffrey Friedman	
2010	The Kids Are All Right	Lisa Cholodenko	
2010	True Grit	Joel and Ethan Coen	
2011	Midnight Run	Neil Shelley	Short film
2011	The Twilight Saga: Breaking Dawn – Part 1	Bill Condon	
2012	Seven Psychopaths	Martin McDonagh	
2012	The Twilight Saga: Breaking Dawn – Part 2	Bill Condon	
2013	The Fifth Estate	Bill Condon	
2015	Mr. Holmes	Bill Condon	
2015	Carol	Todd Haynes	
2015	The Family Fang	Jason Bateman	
2015	Legend	Brian Helgeland	
2015	Anomalisa	Charlie Kaufman; Duke Johnson	
2016	The Finest Hours	Craig Gillespie	
2016	Hail, Caesar!	Joel and Ethan Coen	
2016	The Founder	John Lee Hancock	
2017	Wonderstruck	Todd Haynes	
2017	Three Billboards Outside Ebbing, Missouri	Martin McDonagh	
2017	Goodbye Christopher Robin	Simon Curtis	
2018	The Ballad of Buster Scruggs	Joel and Ethan Coen	
2019	Missing Link	Chris Butler	
2019	The Good Liar	Bill Condon	
2021	The Tragedy of Macbeth	Joel Coen	
2022	Catherine Called Birdy	Lena Dunham	
2022	The Banshees of Inisherin	Martin McDonagh	
2023	To Catch a Killer	Damián Szifron	
2024	Drive-Away Dolls	Ethan Coen	
2025	Honey Don't!	Ethan Coen	
2025	Good Fortune	Aziz Ansari	also producer, conductor and orchestrator
2026	Wild Horse Nine	Martin McDonagh	
2027	Jack of Spades	Joel Coen	

=== Television ===
Year	Title	Network	Notes
1990–1991	Clash!	Ha! / Comedy Central	Main title theme
1993	And the Band Played On	HBO	Television film
2011	Mildred Pierce	HBO	Miniseries; 5 episodes
2011	Enlightened	HBO	Episode: “Pilot”
2014	Olive Kitteridge	HBO	Miniseries; 4 episodes
2019–present	The Morning Show	Apple TV+	Series
2020	Space Force	Netflix	Season 1 only

== Awards and nominations ==
Organizations	Year	Category	Work	Result	Ref.
Academy Awards	2015	Best Original Score	Carol	Nominated	
Academy Awards	2017	Best Original Score	Three Billboards Outside Ebbing, Missouri	Nominated	
Academy Awards	2022	Best Original Score	The Banshees of Inisherin	Nominated	
BAFTA Award	2001	Best Original Music	The Man Who Wasn't There	Nominated	
BAFTA Award	2022	Best Original Music	The Banshees of Inisherin	Nominated	
Golden Globe Award	2009	Best Original Score	Where the Wild Things Are	Nominated	
Golden Globe Award	2015	Best Original Score	Carol	Nominated	
Golden Globe Award	2017	Best Original Score	Three Billboards Outside Ebbing, Missouri	Nominated	
Golden Globe Award	2022	Best Original Score	The Banshees of Inisherin	Nominated	
Primetime Emmy Awards	2011	Outstanding Music Composition for a Miniseries or Movie	Mildred Pierce (episode: "Part 5")	Won	
Primetime Emmy Awards	2011	Outstanding Original Main Title Theme Music	Mildred Pierce	Nominated	
