= February House =

Former artists' commune in Brooklyn Heights, New York City, US

The February House was an artists' commune from 1940 to 1941 in the neighborhood of Brooklyn Heights, New York City.

== History ==
George Davis, an editor for Harper's Bazaar, rented a brownstone at 7 Middagh St. from late 1940 to 1941. Davis invited friends to move in, looking to foster a creative environment for artists. The main residents of February House were W.H. Auden, Carson McCullers, Benjamin Britten, Paul Bowles, and Gypsy Rose Lee. The house itself was a mock-Tudor brownstone in disrepair, with faulty plumbing and a lack of locks. Guests of the February House included Salvador and Gala Dalí, Anaïs Nin, Klaus Mann, Jane Bowles, Richard Wright, and Pavel Pchelitchew. It was Nin who named the it February House, for the number of residents with February birthdays.

A number of works were created at the February House: McCullers began writing The Ballad of the Sad Cafe, meeting the inspiration for the characters at a bar in the neighborhood. Lee published The G-String Murders. Auden published The Double Man. Jane Bowles began writing Two Serious Ladies.

By the end of 1941, the main residents of February house, save Davis, had moved out. Auden was broke and took a position at the University of Michigan in Ann Arbor. McCullers moved in with her mother in Georgia. Lee moved to Chicago for better opportunities. Britten returned to England and produced Peter Grimes. In 1945, Davis left the house too. Soon after Davis left, the house was demolished to construct the Brooklyn-Queens Expressway.

== In media ==
In 2012, a musical February House by Gabriel Kahane and Seth Bockley premiered at the Public Theater. It ran for two weeks.

In 2005, a biography February House was written by Sherill Tippins.

In 2025, BBC Radio 3 broadcast a program The February House. One of the contributors was Sherill Tippins.
