= Ahmed Yacoubi =

Moroccan painter (1928-1985)

- Born: Ahmed ben Driss El Yacoubi; 1928; Fez, Morocco
- Died: December 25, 1985 (aged 56–57)
- Known for: Painter, playwright, author, storyteller.

Ahmed ben Driss el Yacoubi (1928–1985) was a Moroccan painter, playwright, author, and storyteller. He was born in Fez, Morocco.

== Career ==
Yacoubi met the American composer and writer Paul Bowles in Fez in 1947, and later in Tangier. Yacoubi then began doing translations for Bowles. Bowles and his wife, novelist and playwright Jane Bowles, encouraged Yacoubi to draw and paint the characters in his own stories after seeing Yacoubi's illustrations of his translations.

Bowles was interested in recording music from different cultures, and invited Yacoubi to translate for him in Spain, Italy, Turkey, India, Malaysia, Hong Kong, and Japan. Bowles then transcribed Yacoubi's own stories from Maghrebi into English: "The Man and The Woman" (1956), "The Man Who Dreamed of Fish Eating Fish" (1956), and "The Game" (1961). Yacoubi's play The Night Before Thinking was published in the Evergreen Review in 1961. In 1964, the play was produced by La MaMa Experimental Theatre Club at their East Village theater and at Lucille Lortel's White Barn Theater in Westport, Connecticut. Yacoubi also contributed to set design and construction for productions at La MaMa during the 1970s, including Arden of Faversham and Alfred Jarry's Ubu, directed by Andrei Serban in 1970, and Oh Taeseok's Jilsa, directed by Duk-Hyung Yoo in 1974.

The Bowles arranged for Yacoubi's first exhibition of visual work at the Gallimard bookshop on Boulevard Pasteur in Tangier. The exhibition was highly acclaimed, and 28 pieces were sold. Later exhibitions were held at the Galerie Clan in Madrid, the Betty Parsons Gallery in New York in 1952, the Hanover Gallery in London in 1957, and elsewhere throughout the 1960s, 1970s, and 1980s. A wide range of notable collectors began acquiring his drawings and paintings, recognizing his talent and artistic integrity. The Museum of Modern Art in New York, the Musée d'Art Moderne de la Ville de Paris, and the São Paulo Museum of Modern Art also purchased his works.

In 1952, Bowles invited Yacoubi to his island, Taprobane, off the southern coast of Sri Lanka. While visiting the island, Yacoubi prepared meals for fellow guest Peggy Guggenheim, which she mentions in her memoir, Confessions of an Art Addict (1997). Guggenheim purchased several of Yacoubi's drawings.

Ahmed Yacoubi evolved from what was described as a primitive style to a sophisticated secret technique of layering in oil glazes that produced canvases of great depth and complexity. Although Yacoubi had already begun painting in oil, Francis Bacon further encouraged his work by painting four small canvases blue and telling him to "Paint!" according to an anecdote by Allen Ginsberg. Bacon and Yacoubi painted together and remained friends for the duration of their lives.

In 1966, Yacoubi moved to the United States and continued to work prolifically, exhibit, and travel. He met and hosted a diversity of international artists, writers, art collectors, and politicians. In New York City, he befriended Peggy Hitchcock and her husband, Walter Bowart, founder of Omen Press. Yacoubi collaborated with friends at the couple's ranch in Tucson and, through this collaboration, published his cookbook, The Alchemist's Cookbook.

Ellen Stewart curated a Yacoubi retrospective at La MaMa in 1989, after his death in 1985. The retrospective included a production of The Night Before Thinking and an exhibition at La MaMa's nonprofit gallery space, La Galleria, at 47 Great Jones Street.

== Personal life ==
Yacoubi lived and travelled with an American writer named Ruth Marthen. In 1959, she gave birth to a daughter, Karima Yacoubi, in Tangier. Karima died of respiratory problems in London in 2004 at the age of 44. In New York City, Ellen Stewart found Yacoubi a home and studio on Great Jones Street, where he met the artist Carol Cannon in 1976. They lived and painted together for seven years, and continued as friends and collaborators after the relationship ended.

Yacoubi died of lung cancer on December 25, 1985, at the age of 57.
