= Things Gone and Things Still Here =

- First edition cover
- Author: Paul Bowles
- Language: English
- Publisher: Black Sparrow Press
- Publication date: January 1, 1977
- Publication place: United States
- Media type: Print
- Pages: 89
- ISBN: 9780876853429
- OCLC: 77781780

Things Gone and Things Still Here is a collection of nine works of short fiction by Paul Bowles, published in 1977 by Black Sparrow Press. The volume is the sixth collection of Bowles's work, much of which is re-published material.

Things Gone and Things Still Here contains examples of Bowles's theme of "transference" or "transformation", in which a human or animal undergoes a Kafkaesque metamorphosis, exchanging identities. The stories "Allal" and "Mejdoub" are representative of these works.

== The stories ==
"Allal"
"Mejdoub"
"You Have Left Your Lotus Pods on the Bus"
"The Fqih"
"Istikhara, Anaya, Medagan, and the Medaganet"
"The Waters of Izli"
"Afternoon With Antaeus"
"Reminders of Bouselham"
"Things Gone and Things Still Here"

== Publication background ==
The stories that comprise Things Gone and Things Still Here were written during a difficult period in Bowles life, during which author and spouse Jane Bowles was in declining health. She and Bowles lived together in Tangiers until her death in 1973. As such, Bowles did not travel during this period to collect material and experiences for his fiction. Bowles was largely occupied with translating audio recordings of Maghrebis stories into English during the early 1970s, in collaboration with Mohammed Mrabet. The tales in this collection "rely more heavily on memory", refashioning subjects from his early life or local tales and legends circulating in Tangiers.

All the stories in the collection are set in North Africa, except "You Have Left Your Lotus Pods on the Bus" which is based on Bowles' brief sojourn in Bangkok, Thailand in 1966. The volume was published by Black Sparrow Press in 1977.

== Sources ==
- Hibbard, Allen. 1993. Paul Bowles: A Study of the Short Fiction. Twayne Publishers. New York. ISBN 0-8057-8318-0
- Hamdaoui, Zoubida. 2013. Themes and Story-Telling Strategies in Paul Bowles's North African Fiction. Tesis Doctoral. University of Granada, Spain. ISBN 978-84-9028-680-7 https://digibug.ugr.es/bitstream/handle/10481/29918/21922500.pdf?sequence=1 Retrieved 19 August 2022.
- Vidal, Gore. 1979. Introduction to Paul Bowles; Collected Stories, 1939-1976. Black Sparrow Press. Santa Rosa. 2001. ISBN 0876853963
