= The Time of Friendship =

Short story collection by Paul Bowles

- First edition cover
- Author: Paul Bowles
- Language: English
- Publisher: Holt, Rinehart and Winston
- Publication date: January 1, 1967
- Publication place: United States
- Media type: Print (hardback)
- Pages: 215

The Time of Friendship is a collection of 13 works of short fiction by Paul Bowles published in 1967 by Holt, Rinehart and Winston. A number of the stories included in this volume appeared earlier "in various places during the 1950s and 1960s."

The short stories that appear in The Time of Friendship are among the 39 works that Bowles wrote from the late 1930s to the 1970s. Other collections published in the United States include The Delicate Prey and Other Stories (1950) and Things Gone and Still Here (1977).

His complete short fiction was published in Paul Bowles: The Collected Stories, 1939-1976 (1980) by Black Sparrow Press.

== Contents ==
- "The Time of Friendship"
- "The Successor"
- "The Hours After Noon"
- "A Friend of the World"
- "He of the Assembly"
- "The Story of Lahcen and Idir"
- "The Wind at Beni Midar"
- "The Hyena"
- "The Garden"
- "Doña Faustina"
- "Tapiama"
- "If I Should Open My Mouth"
- "The Frozen Fields"

== Critical assessment ==
Shortly before the publication of the collection The Time of Friendship in 1967, Bowles told interviewer Daniel Halpern that the short fiction from The Delicate Prey and Other Stories (1950) remained his favorites.

Biographer Allen Hibbard considers the stories in The Time of Friendship to be "tamer" than those in the earlier volume, and though "no less poignant", lack any effort "to extent the boundaries of what could be done with the short story." Literary critic Maureen Howard writes:

Reading The Time of Friendship, Paul Bowles's … collection of stories, I was aware of a career honest in its aims but only occasionally swinging free of a steady performance…. Bowles sticks with what he can do. Here are the gothic tales with their meaningless violence and seedy Arab settings which repeat the formula established in The Delicate Prey and Other Stories seventeen years ago…He is still involved with his ideas of twenty years ago but he has lost his passion for them. The existential experience of The Sheltering Sky can never seem dated, but many of the empty exotic scenes in The Time of Friendship depend upon a bleak modernity which has worn thin even for Bowles."

Literary critic Daniel Stern writes:

Paul Bowles's universe (and it is a mark of distinction that there is a Bowlesian universe) is made up of primitive but wise natives and effete children of the West searching for escape from the self—that self that supposedly hangs like an albatross around the neck of modern literature, from Hemingway to Herzog, feeding thought and stifling feeling. These clichés of the romantic genre are the dangers he lives with; his victories over them are the signposts of his artistry. They are to be seen scattered through his new volume of short stories, "The Time of Friendship," his first such collection since that excellent book, The Delicate Prey and Other Stories (1950)

"A maturation of style and a realization of greater complexity are noticeable in many of the stories, the most powerful among them being 'The Time of Friendship', 'The Hours After Noon', 'Doña Faustina' and 'The Frozen Fields.'" - Literary critic Allen Hibbard in Paul Bowles: A Study of the Short Stories (1993).

Critic Bernard Bergonzi writes:

Critics have already placed Mr. Bowles as a writer of Gothic tendency with a taste for gamey, melodramatic situations and not much liking for humanity. This is a fair enough description of his short stories; still one must insist on his extreme verbal skill, while finding what he does with it very limited and ultimately monotonous. He places his characters before us and then destroys them in an unerring way: it is a remarkable performance, but one expects something more from literature.

== Style and theme ==
Time writes:

The pieces that make up Paul Bowles's first collection of stories in 17 years in The Time of Friendship read like obituaries of the soul. His characters, robbed of purpose, their spirits rubbed flat, move zombielike through exquisitely desolate landscapes—Moroccan ghettos, Algerian deserts, New York subway tunnels. Displaced in the present, they have vague pasts and menacing futures; sighing despair, they search for something unnameable.

Perhaps their quest is for what they find: hostility, hallucination, more intense dislocation, the last retreat of death—Bowles doesn't say. After several novels, books of stories and essays, he is still an inscrutable artist. He fixes his characters in his own hopeless wastelands and in the reader's shocked consciousness. His warped people are beyond help because they will not help themselves. They have surrendered, and Bowles, the devil's advocate, grinds them further into defeat. He is American fiction's leading specialist in melancholy and insensate violence....

At his best, Bowles has no peer in his sullen art, and he offers here two superb stories of despair that prove it…For his terrifying, black penetration of the heart, Paul Bowles commands cold admiration. Living in Africa, corresponding with America in a kind of code, he uses the same metaphors of loneliness and abandon that signaled his leap from music to the novel with The Sheltering Sky in 1949. His work is art, a minor art, mirroring a part truth—that man is alone.

== Sources ==
- Bowles, Paul. 2001. Paul Bowles; Collected Stories, 1939-1976. Black Sparrow Press. Santa Rosa. 2001.ISBN 0876853963
- Hibbard, Allen. 1993. Paul Bowles: A Study of the Short Fiction. Twayne Publishers. New York. ISBN 0-8057-8318-0
- Vidal, Gore. 1979. Introduction to Paul Bowles; Collected Stories, 1939-1976. Black Sparrow Press. Santa Rosa. 2001. ISBN 0876853963
