= The Garden (short story) =

- Short story by Paul Bowles
- Country: United States
- Language: English

Publication
- Published in: Art & Literature (Lausanne)
- Publication date: Autumn–Winter 1964

The Garden is a short story by Paul Bowles written 1950. It was first published in the Autumn–Winter 1964 issue of Art & Literature (Lausanne). It later appeared in his short fiction collection The Time of Friendship (1967) published by Holt, Rinehart and Winston. Bowles completed the story in Asilah, Morocco. At only three pages The Garden, the briefest of Bowles's short fiction, is one of three fables that appear in the volume. The other two are “The Hyena” and “The Successor”. The story serves to challenge “the moral legitimacy of established religion, in this case Islam.”

== Plot ==
An unnamed gardener tends a small parcel of land near a small oasis, cultivating pomegranates and barley. His occupation is deeply gratifying and fills him with joy. The man's wife, noting his quiet contentment, secretly suspects that her spouse is hoarding a hidden treasure, and is determined to extract from him its whereabouts. She consults a sorceress, who provides the wife with a potion. The spouse slips the mixture into the gardener's food. The man slowly sickens, but reveals nothing. When the wife increases the dose, he descends into a coma, and the wife flees the village, fearing she will be charged with murder. The man gradually regains his health, and resumes his work in the garden. He becomes increasingly detached from the local community, tending only to his garden. The local Imam is notified by the man's neighbors that he has ceased attending the mosque for prayer, and that his wife has disappeared. He visits the man and reminds him of his debt to Allah for the beauty of the garden. When the gardener denies divine intervention, the imam strikes him in the face and departs. The local populace converges on the oasis and beat the gardener to death, leaving his corpse. The pomegranates and barley slowly die, and the garden is reclaimed by the desert.

== Theme ==
"The Garden" gives a rather unflattering view of orthodox Islam.” Biographer Allen Hibbard in Paul Bowles: A Study of the Short Fiction (1993)

“The Garden”, a fable, postulates an inherent conflict between Islamic religious orthodoxy and the order and beauty wrought by individual creative expression. When the gardener declares that his self-reliance and hard work—and not divine intervention—is the source of the garden's beauty, the local imam mobilizes the local community against him. He is stoned and beaten to death by the villagers as a heretic. The desert encroaches on the garden, leaving it a wasteland, a metaphor reflecting “the cultural sterility and stagnation in a world that continually seeks to destroy art.”

“The Garden” invokes Voltaire's exhortation that “"we must tend our garden.” Literary critic John Ditsky writes:

"The Garden” [formulates] the basic image of a Voltairean truth. A man works his garden until it is the most beautiful thing in the oasis on which he lives…All he knows now is his garden, and when he even forgets to thank Allah for his good luck, his suspicious neighbors finally kill him…It is as though, even if the plain truth be that nothing has meaning but what an individual creates out of the promptings of his own nature, that truth will not satisfy the mass of men, who demand some sort of imposed and arbitrary metaphysics.

== Sources ==
- Bowles, Paul. 2001. Paul Bowles; Collected Stories, 1939-1976. Black Sparrow Press. Santa Rosa. 2001.ISBN 0876853963
- Ditsky, John. 1986. The Time of Friendship: The Short Stories of Paul Bowles. Twentieth Century Literature, 34, no. 3-4 (1986) pp. 373–377. https://www.jstor.org/stable/441354
- Hibbard, Allen. 1993. Paul Bowles: A Study of the Short Fiction. Twayne Publishers. New York. ISBN 0-8057-8318-0
