= A Hundred Camels in the Courtyard =

1962 short fiction collection by Paul Bowles

- First edition cover
- Author: Paul Bowles
- Language: English
- Publisher: City Lights Press
- Publication date: April 1, 1962
- Publication place: United States
- Media type: Print ( trade paperback)
- Pages: 64
- ISBN: 9780872860025
- OCLC: 77781780

A Hundred Camels in the Courtyard is a collection of short fiction by Paul Bowles published by City Lights Books in 1962. The volume was the first collection of his works published in the United States since The Delicate Prey and Other Stories (1950).

The four stories that comprise the volume have plots and themes that involve kif, a cannabis derivative used among the Moghrebi people of Morocco.

== The stories ==
A Friend of the World
He of the Assembly
The Story of Laheen and Idir
The Wind at Beni Midar

== Publication history ==
“A pipe of kif before breakfast gives a man the strength of a hundred camels in the courtyard.”—Moghrebi Proverb

The publication of A Hundred Camels in the Courtyard originated in a visit by poet Allen Ginsberg with Bowles who was a resident of Tangiers in the early 1960s. Ginsberg encouraged him to contact Lawrence Ferlinghetti, who had published the poet's Howl in 1956. Bowles submitted four short stories, all dealing with the use of kif, a product of the cannabis plant. This so-called “Kif Quartet" was published by City Lights Books in 1962.

Bowles cautioned Ferlinghetti not to include any references to Morocco in the promotional descriptions of the book. The smoking of kif was discouraged by the Moroccan authorities, and Bowles was concerned that he and his spouse, the author Jane Bowles, might suffer retaliation.

== Critical Assessment ==
Critic Allen Hibbard wrote,

If one of the distinguishing characteristics of the stories in this volume is the prominent role kif plays as an agent for liberating or twisting the imagination, another is that these stories have no Western characters at all. This in itself is a major literary achievement.

Literary critic Robert Kirsch believed that the collection of short stories, which he described as being "built on the strange vocabulary of drugs and hallucinations", was among the best writing that Bowles had produced. Reviewer George Lea, writing for the San Francisco Examiner in 1962, considered the stories to be "full of event, scheme, surprised and humor", suggesting that Bowles deserved celebration.

== Sources ==
- Bowles, Paul. 2001. Paul Bowles; Collected Stories, 1939-1976. Black Sparrow Press. Santa Rosa. 2001.ISBN 0-87685-396-3
- Hibbard, Allen. 1993. Paul Bowles: A Study of the Short Fiction. Twayne Publishers. New York. ISBN 0-8057-8318-0
