= Millicent Dillon =

American writer (1925–2025)

- Born: Millicent Gerson; May 24, 1925; New York City, U.S.
- Died: January 27, 2025 (aged 99); Daly City, California, U.S.
- Education: Hunter College; San Francisco State University
- Occupation: Writer
- Spouse(s): Murray Lesser (divorced) David Dillon (divorced)
- Children: 2, including Wendy
- Writing career
- Notable awards: O. Henry Award (x5)

Millicent Dillon (née Gerson; May 24, 1925 – January 27, 2025) was an American writer. She was born in New York City and studied physics at Hunter College. She also worked variously at Princeton University, Standard Oil Company, Nuclear Energy for the Propulsion of Aircraft, and Northrop Aircraft. In 1965, at the age of 40, Dillon enrolled in the creative writing program at San Francisco State University. Subsequently, she taught at Foothill College in Los Altos, California. She also worked at Stanford University for nearly a decade.

Millicent became a full-time writer in 1983. She is best known for her scholarly works on the American writers Jane Bowles and Paul Bowles. These include a couple of biographies and a collection of letters, as well as The Viking Portable Paul and Jane Bowles (1994) which Dillon edited. Besides these, she also wrote short stories, novels, and plays. Her novel Harry Gold (2000) was nominated for the PEN Faulkner Award. She won five O. Henry Awards and also received a Guggenheim Fellowship.

Dillon was married to Murray Lesser and David Dillon; both marriages ended in divorce. She was the mother of the author Wendy Lesser, and one other daughter. Dillon died in Daly City, California, on January 27, 2025, at the age of 99.

== Works ==
=== Novels ===
- The One in the Back is Medea (1973)
- The Dance of the Mothers (1991)
- Harry Gold (2000)
- A Version of Love (2003)

=== Short fiction ===
- Baby Perpetua and Other Stories (1971)

=== Non-fiction ===
- A Little Original Sin: The Life and Work of Jane Bowles (1980)
- Out in the World: Selected Letters of Jane Bowles, 1935-1970 (1985, editor)
- After Egypt: Isadora Duncan and Mary Cassatt (1990)
- The Portable Paul and Jane Bowles (1994, editor)
- You Are Not I: A Portrait of Paul Bowles (1998)

=== Stories ===
Title	Publication	Collected in
"Rape"	ca. 1967	Baby Perpetua and Other Stories
"Induce"	Encounter (June 1969)	Baby Perpetua and Other Stories
"Second Bedroom"	Encounter (October 1970)	Baby Perpetua and Other Stories
"Baby Perpetua"	Baby Perpetua and Other Stories (February 1971)	Baby Perpetua and Other Stories
"The Newsboy"	Baby Perpetua and Other Stories (February 1971)	Baby Perpetua and Other Stories
"Ladies' Logic"	Baby Perpetua and Other Stories (February 1971)	Baby Perpetua and Other Stories
"Destiny Canal and the Private Eye"	Baby Perpetua and Other Stories (February 1971)	Baby Perpetua and Other Stories
"The Right to Refuse Service"	Baby Perpetua and Other Stories (February 1971)	Baby Perpetua and Other Stories
"Buttons Are Made of Animal Blood"	Baby Perpetua and Other Stories (February 1971)	Baby Perpetua and Other Stories
"The Uncertain Hours of Willie Post People"	Baby Perpetua and Other Stories (February 1971)	Baby Perpetua and Other Stories
"All the Pelageyas"	Ascent 4.3 (1979)	Prize Stories 1980: The O. Henry Awards
"Walter Walter Wildflower"	The Threepenny Review 1 (Winter-Spring 1980)	-
"Minkin"	The Threepenny Review 6 (Summer 1981)	-
"Cutaneous Horn"	The Threepenny Review 12 (Winter 1983)	-
"Monitor"	The Threepenny Review 23 (Autumn 1985)	Prize Stories 1987: The O. Henry Awards
"The Visiting Teacher"	The Threepenny Review 29 (Spring 1987)	-
"Wrong Stories"	The Southwest Review 73.1 (Winter 1988)	Prize Stories 1989: The O. Henry Awards
"Oil and Water"	The Southwest Review 75.2 (Spring 1990)	Prize Stories 1991: The O. Henry Awards
"Lost in L.A." aka "Untold in L.A."	The Threepenny Review 46 (Summer 1991)	Prize Stories 1992: The O. Henry Awards
"Simple Direct Looks"	The Southwest Review 78.2 (Spring 1993)	-
"Typecast"	The Threepenny Review 69 (Spring 1997)	-
"Mingling"	The Southwest Review 86.4 (2001)	-
"The Risk of the Real"	Ontario Review (Fall 2001-Winter 2002)	-
"Staying"	Michigan Quarterly Review (Winter 2002)	-
"The Healer in the Motel"	Narrative (Winter 2013)	-
"Disbelief"	Narrative (Spring 2018)	-
