= The Spider's House =

Novel by Paul Bowles

- First edition
- Author: Paul Bowles
- Language: English
- Genre: Historical fiction
- Publisher: Random House
- Publication date: 1955
- Publication place: United States
- Media type: Print (hardback)
- Pages: 406 pp

The Spider's House is a novel by Paul Bowles and first published by Random House in 1955.

The third of the author's four novels, The Spider's House is his only work that encompasses a contemporary political crisis: the struggle for Moroccan independence from French colonial rule during the 1950s.

== Plot ==
The story is set during the 1950s in the city of Fez, Morocco during the nationalist uprising against French colonial rule. The holy month of Ramadan is underway. A middle-aged American writer and expatriate, Stenham, resides in the then Medieval-like city. A former Communist, Stenham is disillusioned with the party, and equally hostile to the French colonialist occupiers. He lives an existence of alienation. Another denizen of the city, the poor 15-year-old Arab boy, Amar, supports the rebellion. Through the actions of a well-to-do English painter and an American divorcee, the lives of Stenham and Amar become enmeshed in the social upheavals that engulf the city.

== Publication background ==
The Spider's House was written largely while Bowles was sojourning in Tangiers during 1954, and completed in Ceylon in 1955. Bowles reported that his approach to writing the novel differed sharply from his method for his first two novels, The Sheltering Sky (1949) and Let It Come Down (1952):

[My first two novels were written] during travels, whenever the spirit moved and the physical surroundings were conducive to writing...The Spider's House, from the outset, demanded a rigorous schedule. I began writing it in Tangier in the summer of 1954, setting the alarm for six each morning. I managed to average two pages a day. When winter came I sailed for Sri Lanka. There I adopted the same ritual; early tea was brought in at six o'clock, and I set to work, still meeting my quota of two daily pages."

Critic Virginia Spencer Carr reports that Bowles was concerned that the manuscript he submitted for publication "lacked certain melodramatic flourishes to which his readers had become accustomed." John Lehmann, his British agent and publisher, complained that the novel was "very slow moving, a problem I attribute in part to the central character's being an Arab boy who is neither interesting nor active enough to bear the weight that is put upon him . . . It was a little sentimental and unconvincing."

The third of his four novels, The Spider's House was published by Random House in 1955. The British edition appeared in 1957, published by McDonald. Black Sparrow Press issued an American reprint in 1986.

== Critical assessment ==
Literary critic Charles J. Rolo praised The Spider's House for possessing elements of "a first-class political thriller" but added that "the plot meanders all over the place, accumulating sound and fury and signifying precious little in terms of political ideas or anything else."

Despite these shortcomings, the novel offers a "vivid fidelity and richness of detail with which it re-creates the Arab scene...Bowles has certainly made the explosive city of Fez come powerfully to life."

== Theme and style ==
"Even Chekhov, whom we also tend to think of as a largely apolitical writer (in contrast, say, to Dostoevsky or Tolstoy) frequently established or clarified the nature of his characters by informing the reader about their political sympathies...With Bowles's sangfroid, his lack of empathy, his chilly skepticism, his refusal to demonstrate an even passing interest in the process of spiritual transformation or individual redemption, he is the anti-Chekhov." - Literary critic Francine Prose

The Spider's House has been widely recognized as the most "political" of Bowles's novels. The story is set in Fez during the Moroccan nationalist uprisings of the 1950s. Literary critic Francine Prose, writing in 2002, shortly after the U.S. occupation of Afghanistan, and just before the U. S. invasion of Iraq in 2003 wrote:

The Spider's House ought to top those lists of novels that speak to our present cultural condition. Set in Fez during the first of the upheavals that announced a more radical and violent phase of the Moroccan struggle for independence from the French, the book seems not merely prescient but positively eerie in its evocation of a climate in which every aspect of daily life is affected--and deformed --by the roilings of nationalism and terrorism, by the legacy of colonialism, and by chaotic political strife."

Though occurring in the context of political turmoil, Bowles's nihilistic and misanthropic outlook persists throughout the novel. Literary critic Conrad Knickerbocker observes:

The Spider's House dealt with the futility of the quest for salvation in a blasted universe. Among American writers he stands in the front rank for the substance of his ideas and for the power and conviction with which he expresses his own particular vision, which, if hellish, is totally appropriate to the times.

Charles J. Rolo comments on the reactionary political outlook of the character Stenham ("the character who comes closest, one might argue, to being a stand-in for the author"):

Stenham views the Moroccan conflict with a "plague-on-both-their-houses" attitude: he detests French colonialism and to him the aims and methods of the nationalist Istiqlal Party, party, are 'fundamentally identical with those of Marxism-Leninism.' What he would like is a continuance of the traditional Moslem way of life, and this he knows to be impossible.

== Sources ==
- Hibbard, Allen. 1993. Paul Bowles: A Study of the Short Fiction. Twayne Publishers. New York. ISBN 0-8057-8318-0
- Knickerbocker, Conrad. 1966. The Destruction of Innocence. The New York Times. 12 March 1966. https://archive.nytimes.com/www.nytimes.com/books/98/05/17/specials/bowles-world.html
- Prose, Francine. 2002. The Coldest Eye: acting badly among the Arabs. Harper's Magazine. March, 2002. https://harpers.org/archive/2002/03/the-coldest-eye/ Retrieved 10 July 2022.
- Pulsifer, Gary. 1999. Much-traveled American writer and composer who made his home in Morocco, the setting for his best-known novel, The Sheltering Sky. The Guardian. 19 November 1999. https://www.theguardian.com/books/1999/nov/19/news.obituaries Retrieved 26 July 2022.
- Rolo, Charles J. 1955. Tension in Morocco. https://archive.nytimes.com/www.nytimes.com/books/98/05/17/specials/bowles-spider.html?_r=2&oref=slogin Retrieved 25 July 2022.
- Tóibín, Colm. 2007. Avoid the Orient. Review, Paul Bowles: A Life, by Virginia Spencer Carr. London Review of Books, Vol. 29 No. 1, 4 January 2007. https://www.lrb.co.uk/the-paper/v29/n01/colm-toibin/avoid-the-orient Retrieved 11 July 2022.
