= Midnight Mass (disambiguation) =

Midnight Mass is a Christmas Eve liturgical tradition in the Roman Catholic, Anglican, and Lutheran churches.

Midnight Mass may also refer to:

== Media ==
=== Film, television, and theater ===
- Midnight Mass (miniseries), created by Mike Flanagan for Netflix
- "A Midnight Mass", a scene in the play Intimate Exchanges by Alan Ayckbourn
- Midnight Mass, a movie event series created by Peaches Christ in San Francisco, California

=== Writing ===
- Midnight, Mass., a Vertigo comics series
- Midnight Mass, a 2004 novel by F. Paul Wilson
- Midnight Mass (short story collection), a collection by Paul Bowles

=== Music ===
- Midnight Mass (EP), a 2010 EP by Acid Witch

== Religion ==
- Misa del Gallo, a version of the Midnight Mass in many Spanish-speaking countries
- Pasterka, a Midnight Mass celebrated in Poland
