= Doña Faustina =

- Short story by Paul Bowles
- Language: English

Publication
- Published in: New Directions #12
- Publication date: 1950

"Doña Faustina" is a short story by Paul Bowles written in 1949 and first published in the New Directions #12 anthology in 1950. The work is included in his collections of short fiction The Hours After Noon (1959, Heinemann) and The Time of Friendship (1967, Holt, Rinehart and Winston). Written while Bowles was living in Tangiers, "Doña Faustina" is among several works in the collection that exhibit "a maturation of style and a realization of greater complexity" in his literary talents.

== Plot ==
The story is told in six sections. The setting is an unnamed small town in Mexico "before the radio" was invented, i.e., before the early 20th Century.

Section 1: Doña Faustina, a local widow in her middle-aged prime, purchases an inn—now derelict after a new highway route strands it from out-of-town traffic. Doña Faustina's younger sister Carlota and two elderly servants, José and Elena, reside with her. A vast acreage surrounds the former inn, once cultivated but now reclaimed by an almost impenetrable semi-tropical jungle. The local townspeople are mystified as to why the woman would purchase the useless property. Idle rumors abound, among them that the inn has been converted to a bordello; that the sisters were harboring a notorious bandit; that a drug ring operated on the premises; that the sisters were luring vulnerable travelers to the old inn, robbing and murdering them: all these rumors collapse upon examination. The community is divided: Dona Faustina is deemed either a penniless lunatic or a crafty eccentric hoarding a fortune.

Section 2: When a local child disappears, Doña Faustina is suspected of abduction, and the police are sent to search her residence. Despite the proprietor's hostility, the authorities discover that the home's interior is in shambles, furniture shattered, and decaying food and refuse on the floor. These conditions reinforce the impression that Doña Faustina is pitifully deranged. Locals report the older and younger sisters embarking on mysterious trips to far-flung cities and returning with bundles of goods.

Section 3: The servant José, while searching a "zapotes" on a remote and densely vegetated region on the property, discovers an earthen water tank built for cattle in the estate's heyday and hears a big splash he suspects is caused by some creature. Troubled and intrigued, he returns during subsequent months to solve the mystery. He soon discovers that a man-made path has been cleared from the tank to the old garden at the inn. While walking, he encounters Doña Faustina carrying a covered basket. She fiercely orders Jose back to the house. Jose confides in his wife that Dona Faustina is utterly mad.

Section 4: On a cold and foggy night, a knock is heard on the inn's door. Doña Faustina and Carlota, suspicious, decline to open it. Satisfied that it is not the police, they retire to their respective bedrooms. When Doña Faustina enters her room, she discovers a strange young man standing next to her bed. He immediately subdues her and binds her wrists. The intruder searches the room for money but finds none. He rapes her. Afterward, Doña Faustina makes an offering to the man, encouraging him to ingest the contents of a small packet, "soft and slightly wet." Doña Faustina assures him that the gift will empower him, and he eats the proffered object. She praises him, and he departs from the house.

Section 5: To Carlota's dismay, Doña Faustina announces that she is with child, declaring that her offspring will have "the power of thirty-seven." She cancels all further excursions during her pregnancy. The newborn, a boy, is healthy and strong, "a real little bull" according to the servant Elena. Jose (accent) suspects that the father is the Devil. Months pass and Jose uncovers the source of the splash at the water tank is a giant crocodile. Outraged that such a beast resides unmolested on the property, he reports his discovery to Doña Faustina. She reacts with hostility and denials. Frightened that her husband will be dismissed, Elena attempts to discredit his report. Jose is confined to his quarters because he is delusional, but Dona Faustina is troubled by her servants' inconvenient discovery.

Section 6: Dona Faustina, concerned that the police may be summoned, departs the inn with her sister and infant son and flees to the provincial capital. She applies for and receives an appointment as a police matron based on her strong physique and character. The local police are led to a water tank and discover not one but two crocodiles. The disappearance of dozens of children during the past several years is initially attributed to these creatures. Further investigation of Doña Faustina's home reveals young children's bloody garments. The police concluded that body parts were harvested from the victims. Dona Faustina reads of the discoveries and is complacent that her whereabouts will not be discovered.

Fifteen years have passed. Doña Faustina's son Jesus Maria grows to manhood and is mentored by the Chief of Police. He joins the Mexican army and is soon promoted to colonel. He successfully captures the notorious bandito Fermin Figueros and his gang - the "thirty-seven" his mother had predicted. Rather than execute them as expected, Jesus Maria frees them. He is demoted but exults in this rebellious behavior: "the only time he had ever known how it feels to have power."

== Theme ==
"Doña Faustina" is a macabre mystery told in six sections but lacks a fully explanatory denouement. The plot is lurid with perversely comic elements.

The point-of-view in the work is limited omniscient, similar to that used by William Faulkner in his short story "A Rose For Emily" (1930). Biographer Allen Hibbard notes the influence of Edgar Allan Poe on Bowles's handling of his protagonist:

Though we have almost no access to Dona Faustina's thoughts, we might assume her mental logic would turn with that uncanny, seductive regularity we associate with Poe's narrators.

Literary critic Anne Foltz observes that "'Doña Faustina' owes a good deal to Poe, but the thematic overtones and narrative presentation are purely Bowles."

Bowles blends Christian and pagan iconography and themes in the tale. Doña Faustina empowers the man who rapes her by feeding him the preserved hearts of sacrificial infants. The male child he sires, who Doña Faustina names Jesus Maria —"fusing the Virgin and the Christ Child" — is endowed with supernatural physical strength derived from his mother's pact with the Devil.

Literary critic John Ditsky writes:

In this parable of one woman's ruthless and macabre quest for power through the Aztec device of eating the hearts of the enemy - in this case, innocent babies - the Faustian enterprise is frustrated when her son makes ironic use of his unknown birthright: power for him comes from renouncing control over others…"Doña Faustina" would seem, in the neatness with which it combines Indian, Christian and literary myths…a kind of digression for Paul Bowles, if not some sort of literary exercise in the grotesque.

== Sources ==
- Bowles, Paul. 2001. Paul Bowles; Collected Stories, 1939-1976. Black Sparrow Press. Santa Rosa. 2001.ISBN 0-87685-396-3
- Ditsky, John. 1986. The Time of Friendship: The Short Stories of Paul Bowles. Twentieth Century Literature, 34, no. 3-4 (1986) pp. 373–377.
- Foltz, Anne. 2000. The Review of Contemporary Fiction (Volume 20, Issue 2). Summer, 2000. https://go.gale.com/ps/i.do?id=GALE%7CA63940711&sid=googleScholar&v=2.1&it=r&linkaccess=abs&issn=02760045&p=AONE&sw=w&userGroupName=deschutes Retrieved 10 August 2022.
- Hibbard, Allen. 1993. Paul Bowles: A Study of the Short Fiction. Twayne Publishers. New York. ISBN 0-8057-8318-0
- Oates, Joyce Carol. 1983. "Before God Was Love" in The Profane Art, 128–131. E. P. Dutton. New York. Quoted in Hibbard, 1993 p. 240
