= Paul Bowles =

American composer and writer (1910–1999)

- Born: December 30, 1910; Queens, New York, United States
- Died: November 18, 1999 (aged 88); Tangier, Morocco
- Occupations: American composer, author and translator
- Notable work: The Sheltering Sky

Paul Frederic Bowles (/boʊlz/; December 30, 1910 – November 18, 1999) was an American composer, author, and translator. He became associated with the Moroccan city of Tangier, where he had lived since 1947.

Following a cultured middle-class upbringing in New York City, during which he displayed a talent for music and writing, Bowles pursued his education at the University of Virginia before making several trips to Paris in the 1930s. He studied music with Aaron Copland, and in New York wrote music for theatrical productions, as well as other compositions. He achieved critical and popular success with his first novel The Sheltering Sky (1949), set in French North Africa, which he had visited in 1931.

In 1947, Bowles settled in what was then the Tangier International Zone, and his wife Jane Bowles followed in 1948. Except for winters spent in Ceylon during the early 1950s, Tangier was Bowles's home for the remainder of his life. He came to symbolize American immigrants in the city.

== Life ==
=== 1910–1930: family and education ===
Paul Bowles was born in Jamaica, Queens, New York City, as the only child of Rena (née Winnewisser) and Claude Dietz Bowles, a dentist. His childhood was materially comfortable, but his father was a cold and domineering parent, opposed to any form of play or entertainment, and feared by both his son and wife. According to family legend, Claude had tried to kill his newborn son by leaving him exposed on a window-ledge during a snowstorm. The story may not be true, but Bowles believed it was and that it encapsulated his relationship with his father. Warmth in his childhood was provided by his mother, who read Nathaniel Hawthorne and Edgar Allan Poe to him – it was to the latter that he later attributed his own desire to write stories, such as "The Delicate Prey", "A Distant Episode", and "Pages from Cold Point".

Bowles could read at age 3 and was writing stories by age 4. Soon, he wrote surrealistic poetry and music. In 1922, at age 11, he bought his first book of poetry, Arthur Waley's A Hundred and Seventy Chinese Poems. At age 17, he had a poem, "Spire Song", accepted for publication in the literary journal transition. This Paris-based publication served as a forum for leading proponents of modernism – Djuna Barnes, James Joyce, Paul Éluard, Gertrude Stein and others. Bowles's interest in music also dated from his childhood, when his father bought a phonograph and classical records. (Bowles was interested in jazz, but such records were forbidden by his father.) His family bought a piano, and the young Bowles studied musical theory, singing, and piano. When he was 15, he attended a performance of Stravinsky's The Firebird at Carnegie Hall, which made a profound impression: "Hearing The Firebird made me determined to continue improvising on the piano when my father was out of the house, and to notate my own music with an increasing degree of knowing that I had happened upon a new and exciting mode of expression." Bowles attended Jamaica High School in Queens, NY.

Bowles entered the University of Virginia in 1928, where his interests included T. S. Eliot's The Waste Land, Prokofiev, Duke Ellington, Gregorian chant, and blues. He also heard music by George Antheil and Henry Cowell. In April 1929, he dropped out without informing his parents, and sailed with a one-way ticket for Paris and no intention of returning – not, he said later, running away, but "running toward something, although I didn't know what at the time." Bowles spent the next months working for the Paris Herald Tribune and developing a friendship with the Romanian poet Tristan Tzara. By July, he returned to New York and worked at Duttons Bookshop in Manhattan, where he began work on an unfinished book of fiction, Without Stopping (not to be confused with his later autobiography of the same title).

At the insistence of his parents, Bowles returned to studies at the University of Virginia but left after one semester to return to Paris with Aaron Copland, with whom he had been studying composition in New York. Copland was a lover as well as mentor to Bowles, who would later state that he was "other than Jane the most important person in my life": when their affair concluded, they remained friends for life.

It was during the autumn of 1930 in Paris that Bowles began work on his own first musical composition, the Sonata for Oboe and Clarinet, which he finished the following year. It premiered in New York at the Aeolian Hall on Wigmore Street, December 16, 1931. The entire concert (which also included work by Copland and Virgil Thomson) was panned by New York critics. (Bowles's first-known composition was completed earlier in Berlin: an adaptation as piano music of some vocal pieces by Kurt Schwitters.)

=== 1931–1946: France and New York ===
In Paris, Bowles became a part of Gertrude Stein's literary and artistic circle. On her advice, he made his first visit to Tangier with Aaron Copland in the summer of 1931. They took a house on the mountain above Tangier Bay. Bowles later made Morocco his full-time home, and it inspired many of his short stories. From Tangier he returned to Berlin, where he met British writers Stephen Spender and Christopher Isherwood. (Isherwood was reportedly so taken with him that he named Sally Bowles, a character in a novel, after him.) The next year, Bowles returned to North Africa, traveling through other parts of Morocco, the Sahara, Algeria, and Tunisia.

In 1937, Bowles returned to New York. Over the next decade, he established a solid reputation as a composer, collaborating with Orson Welles, Tennessee Williams, and others on music for stage productions, as well as orchestral pieces.

In 1938, he married Jane Auer, an author and playwright. It was an unconventional marriage; their intimate relationships were reportedly with people of their own sex, but the couple maintained close personal ties with each other. During this time the couple joined the Communist Party of USA but soon left the organization after Bowles was ejected from the party.

Bowles has frequently been featured in anthologies as a gay writer, although he regarded such categories as both absurd and irrelevant. After a brief sojourn in France, the couple were prominent among the literary figures of New York throughout the 1940s. They briefly lived in February House in late 1939, using burlesque dancer Gypsy Rose Lee's room while she was performing in Chicago, but clashed with Benjamin Britten over use of the piano for composing, and other housemates over their noisy bedroom fantasies. Bowles also worked under Virgil Thomson as a music critic at the New York Herald Tribune. His zarzuela, The Wind Remains, based on a poem by Federico García Lorca, was performed in 1943 with choreography by Merce Cunningham and conducted by Leonard Bernstein. His translation of Jean-Paul Sartre's play Huis Clos (No Exit), directed by John Huston, won a Drama Critic's Award in 1943.

In 1945, Bowles began writing prose again, beginning with a few short stories including "A Distant Episode". His wife Jane, he said, was the main influence upon his taking up fiction as an adult, when she published her first novel Two Serious Ladies (1943).

=== 1947–1956: early years in Tangier ===
In 1947, Bowles received a contract for a novel from Doubleday; with the advance, he moved permanently to Tangier. Jane joined him there the following year. Bowles commented:

I was a composer for as long as I've been a writer. I came here because I wanted to write a novel. I had a commission to do it. I was sick of writing music for other people – Joseph Losey, Orson Welles, a whole lot of other people, endless.

Bowles traveled alone into the Algerian Sahara to work on the novel. He later said, "I wrote in bed in hotels in the desert." He drew inspiration from personal experience, noting years later that, "Whatever one writes is in a sense autobiographical, of course. Not factually so, but poetically so." He titled the novel The Sheltering Sky, from a song, "Down Among the Sheltering Palms", which he had heard every summer as a child. It was first published by John Lehmann Limited in England, in September 1949, after Doubleday rejected the manuscript.

Bowles recalled:

I sent it out to Doubleday and they refused it. They said, "We asked for a novel." They didn't consider it a novel. I had to give back my advance. My agent told me later they called the editor on the carpet for having refused the books – only after they saw that it was selling fast. It only had to do with sales. They didn't bother to read it.

A first American edition, by New Directions Publishing, appeared the following month. The plot follows three Americans: Port, his wife Kit, and their friend, Tunner, as they journey through the Algerian desert. The reviewer for TIME magazine commented that the ends visited upon the two main characters "seem appropriate but by no means tragic", but that "Bowles scores cleanly with his minor characters: Arab pimps and prostitutes, French officers in garrison towns, [and] a stupidly tiresome pair of tourists—mother & son." In The New York Times, playwright and critic Tennessee Williams commented that the book was like a summer thunderstorm, "pulsing with interior flashes of fire". The book quickly rose to the New York Times best-seller list, going through three printings in two months.

In 1950, Bowles published his first collection of short stories. Titled A Little Stone (John Lehmann, London, August 1950), it omitted two of Bowles's most famous short stories, "Pages From Cold Point" and "The Delicate Prey". British critic Cyril Connolly and writer Somerset Maugham had advised him that if they were included in the collection, distribution and/or censorship difficulties might ensue. The American edition by Random House, The Delicate Prey and Other Stories (November 1950), did include these two stories.

In an interview 30 years later, Bowles responded to an observation that almost all of the characters in "The Delicate Prey" were victimized by either physical or psychological violence. He said:

Yes, I suppose. The violence served a therapeutic purpose. It's unsettling to think that at any moment life can flare up into senseless violence. But it can and does, and people need to be ready for it. What you make for others is first of all what you make for yourself. If I'm persuaded that our life is predicated upon violence, that the entire structure of what we call civilization, the scaffolding that we've built up over the millennia, can collapse at any moment, then whatever I write is going to be affected by that assumption. The process of life presupposes violence, in the plant world the same as the animal world. But among the animals only man can conceptualize violence. Only man can enjoy the idea of destruction.

He set his second novel, Let It Come Down (John Lehmann, London, February 1952), in North Africa, specifically Tangier. It explored the disintegration of an American (Nelson Dyar) who was unprepared for the encounter with an alien culture. The first American edition by Random House was published later that same month.

Bowles set his third novel, The Spider's House (Random House, New York, November 1955), in Fez, immediately prior to Morocco's gaining independence and sovereignty in 1956. In it, he charted the relationships among three immigrants and a young Moroccan: John Stenham, Alain Moss, Lee Veyron, and Amar. Reviewers noted that the novel marked a departure from Bowles's earlier fiction in that it introduced a contemporary political theme, the conflict between Moroccan nationalism and French colonialism. The UK edition (Macdonald) was published in January 1957.

While Bowles was concentrating on his career as a writer, he composed incidental music for nine plays presented by the American School of Tangier. The Bowles couple became fixtures of the American and European immigrant scene in Tangier. Visitors included Truman Capote, Joseph Glasco, Tennessee Williams and Gore Vidal. William S. Burroughs, and the Beat writers Allen Ginsberg and Gregory Corso followed in the mid-1950s and early 1960s. In 1951, Bowles was introduced to the Master Musicians of Jajouka, having first heard the musicians when he and Brion Gysin attended a festival, or moussem, at Sidi Kacem. Bowles described his continued association with the Master Musicians of Jajouka and their hereditary leader Bachir Attar in his book, Days: A Tangier Diary.

In 1952, Bowles bought the tiny island of Taprobane, off the coast of Ceylon. There, he wrote much of his novel The Spider's House and returned to Tangier in the warmer months. He stayed in Sri Lanka most winters.

=== 1957–1973: Moroccan music and translation ===
In 1957, Jane Bowles had a mild stroke, which marked the beginning of a prolonged decline in her health. Her condition preoccupied Paul Bowles until Jane's death in 1973.

During the late 1950s, Morocco achieved independence. With a grant from the Rockefeller Foundation and sponsorship from the US Library of Congress, Bowles spent the months of August to September 1959 traveling throughout Morocco with Christopher Wanklyn and Mohammed Larbi, recording traditional Moroccan music. From 1959 to 1961, Bowles recorded a wide variety of music from the different ethnic groups in Morocco, including the Sephardic Jewish communities of Meknes and Essaouira.

During these years, Bowles also worked at translating Moroccan authors and story-tellers, including Mohamed Choukri, Ahmed Yacoubi, Larbi Layachi (under the pseudonym Driss ben Hamed Charhadi), and Mohamed Mrabet.

In the autumn of 1968, invited by friend Oliver Evans, Bowles was a visiting scholar for one semester at the English Department of the San Fernando Valley State College, (now California State University, Northridge). He taught "Advanced Narrative Writing and the Modern European Novel."

In 1970, Bowles and Daniel Halpern founded the literary magazine Antaeus, based in Tangier. It featured many new, as well as established authors. Bowles's work was also represented, including his story "Afternoon with Antaeus."

=== 1974–1995: later years ===
After his wife's death, on May 4, 1973, in Málaga, Spain, Bowles continued to live in Tangier. He wrote regularly and received many visitors to his modest apartment.

In the summers of 1980 and 1982, Bowles conducted writing workshops in Morocco, at the American School of Tangier (under the auspices of the School of Visual Arts in New York). These were considered successful. Among several students who have become successful authors are Rodrigo Rey Rosa, the 2004 Winner of the Miguel Ángel Asturias National Prize in Literature, and Mark Terrill. Bowles designated Rey Rosa as the literary heir of his and Jane Bowles's estates.

In 1982, Bowles published Points in Time, subtitled Tales From Morocco, a collection of stories. Divided into eleven parts, the work consists of untitled story fragments, anecdotes, and travel narratives. These stories are not included in either The Stories of Paul Bowles (Ecco Press) or Collected Stories and Later Writings (The Library of America).

Also in 1982, Paul Bowles worked with Karren Alenier on several of the Stein poems associated with her opera libretto Gertrude Stein Invents A Jump Early On.

In 1985, Bowles published his translation of Jorge Luis Borges's short story "The Circular Ruins". It was collected in a book of 16 stories, all translated by Bowles, called She Woke Me Up So I Killed Her. This Borges story had previously been published in translations by the three main Borges translators: Anthony Kerrigan, Anthony Bonner, and James E. Irby.

In 1988, when Bowles was asked in an interview about his social life, he replied, "I don't know what a social life is ... My social life is restricted to those who serve me and give me meals, and those who want to interview me." When asked in the same interview how he would summarize his achievement, he said, "I've written some books and some music. That's what I've achieved."

Bowles had a cameo appearance at the beginning and end of the film version of The Sheltering Sky (1990), directed by Bernardo Bertolucci. Bowles's music was overlooked and mostly forgotten for more than a generation, but in the 1990s, a new generation of American musicians and singers became interested in his work again. Art song enthusiasts savor what are described as "charming, witty pieces." In 1994, Bowles was visited and interviewed by writer Paul Theroux, who featured him in his last chapter of his travel book, The Pillars of Hercules.

=== 1995–1999: final years ===
In 1995, Bowles made his final return to New York, invited to a "Paul Bowles Festival" at Lincoln Center celebrating his music. The music was performed by Jonathan Sheffer leading the Eos Orchestra. A related symposium on Bowles's work and interview were held at The New School for Social Research. A Canadian documentary on his life, Let It Come Down: The Life of Paul Bowles won Best Documentary at the 27th Annual International Emmy Awards in New York City.

Visitors in 1998 reported that Bowles's wit and intellect endured. He continued to welcome visitors to his apartment in Tangier but, on the advice of doctors and friends, limited interviews. One of the last was an interview with Stephen Morison Jr., a friend teaching at the American School of Tangier. It was featured in the July/August 1999 issue of Poets & Writers magazine. On June 6, 1999, Irene Herrmann, the executrix of the Paul Bowles Music Estate, interviewed him to focus on his musical career; this was published in September 2003.

Bowles died of heart failure on November 18, 1999, at the Italian Hospital in Tangier, aged 88. He had been ill for some time with respiratory problems. His ashes were buried in Lakemont, New York, next to the graves of his parents and grandparents.

== Bowles and Tangier ==
Paul Bowles lived for 52 years in Tangier, from 1947 until his death, and became strongly identified with the city as its most prominent American expatriate. He first visited the city in 1931 with Aaron Copland. At that time, Tangier was an international zone administered by a consortium of foreign powers, including the United States, France, and Spain. Its population was ethnically diverse, comprising Berber, Arab, Spanish, and French inhabitants, among others, and the city functioned as a major Mediterranean trading port.

When Bowles returned to settle permanently in 1947, the international zone was still in effect. In 1955, civil unrest broke out as Moroccan nationalists agitated against French colonial rule. Morocco gain independence in 1956, at which point Tangier's international zone status was dissolved and the city was incorporated into the Kingdom of Morocco.

== Music ==
=== Introduction ===
Paul Bowles first studied music with Aaron Copland. In the fall of 1931, following an introduction from Copland, he entered the studio of Virgil Thomson.

Bowles had thought of himself first as a poet, having published some verse in his brief time at the University of Virginia in the pages of transition. Unfortunately, the quality of his poetry eluded any of the intellectuals he would later encounter in Paris. Among them was Gertrude Stein, from whom he received the sobriquet, "the manufactured savage," and who begged him to give up writing poetry.

However, his music of the time, demonstrated by a propensity for Ravel-like piano improvisations, charmed both Copland and Thomson, alike. In his book, Copland On Music (Doubleday & Company, New York, 1960), Copland remarked:

There are those who refuse to see in Bowles anything more than a dilettante. Bowles himself persists in adopting a militantly non-professional air in relation to all music, including his own.

It is music that comes from a fresh personality, music full of charm and melodic invention, at times surprisingly well made in an instinctive and non-academic fashion.

Personally I much prefer an "amateur" like Bowles to your "well-trained" conservatory product.

For Copland the allure of Bowles's music would never diminish. In later years he was recorded as having said, "Paul Bowles' music is always fresh; I've never known him to write a dull piece."

However, the precocity of Bowles's early musical efforts would later belie a lack of professional training and discipline. Copland had tried in New York to teach him harmony, but had found him to be a stubborn pupil. In Paris Bowles approached Nadia Boulanger for lessons, and Thomson recommended him to Paul Dukas. In the end, he would work with neither.

=== Development ===
Apart from irregular consultation with Vittorio Rieti, Bowles never received any formal instruction in music, despite the best efforts of Aaron Copland and Virgil Thomson to persuade him otherwise. However, the self-taught composer, with assistance from Thomson, found success in New York as a producer of incidental music for the theatre. He collaborated with the likes of George Balanchine, Joseph Losey, Leonard Bernstein, Elia Kazan, Arthur Koestler, José Ferrer, Salvador Dalí, Orson Welles, William Saroyan and Tennessee Williams.

During the Second World War he turned his hand to writing as a reviewer for the New York Herald Tribune, where Thomson then served as music critic. Bowles was well-suited to the work, according to Thomson, "because he wrote clearly and because he had the gift of judgment."

Following Virgil Thomson's retirement from his critic's post in 1954, reminiscing on his wish Paul Bowles had taken over the position, Bowles remarked, "I don't think I could have handled it, any more than I could have followed a career in composition. I lacked the musical training that [Virgil] and Aaron had."

=== A new direction ===
After the war, eventually settling in Tangier, Morocco, Bowles continued his musical and literary pursuits, gradually letting go of the former and becoming what Virgil Thomson described as, "a novelist and story writer of international repute."

Paul Bowles referred to Tangier as "a place where it is still hard to find a piano in tune." Regarding his establishment as an author in Morocco, Bowles said:

Little by little I was aware of there being atmospheres which I could only portray by writing about them. I was unable to express my emotions in their entirety through music. My music was joyful as I was myself. The more nocturnal side to my personality, I managed to express through language.

With the success of the book, The Sheltering Sky, Bowles struck his first blow for independence. In time this break from the composition of music would see Bowles's earlier exploits overshadowed completely by his acclaim as a writer of prose.

=== Recapitulation ===
Only in the decade before his death was there a renewed interest in his musical output from the 1930s and '40s. This movement may have culminated in May 1994, at the Théâtre du Rond-Point in Paris, with the presentation of a live concert performance, and at which the then 83-year-old Paul Bowles was in attendance. The program included a number of Bowles's original songs and pieces for piano, plus musical tributes and portraits of the composer by Virgil Thomson, Leonard Bernstein, and Phillip Ramey. At least as regards the past neglect of his own catalogue, this ongoing revival may serve as proof of Bowles's own words: "Music only exists when it is played."

Renewal of respect for Paul Bowles's music has led to several commercial recording projects. In 2016 the Invencia Piano Duo (Andrey Kasparov and Oksana Lutsyshyn), in collaboration with Naxos Records and its American Classics division, released two CDs of Bowles's complete piano works.

Volume one opens with pieces inspired by Latin American themes, evocative of the composer's interest in the culture and his fluency in the Spanish language. The second of the two volumes closes with arrangements of Blue Mountain Ballads (1946), set for piano duet by Dr. Andrey Kasparov, and three miscellaneous pieces, set for two pianos by the American piano duo of Arthur Gold and Robert Fizdale. The latter three arrangements were uncovered in the Gold and Fizdale Collection, held in the Peter Jay Sharp Special Collections, Lila Acheson Wallace Library, The Juilliard School. Dr. Kasparov reconstructed the original manuscripts which permitted these duets to be recorded for the very first time.

=== Recording of Moroccan music ===
Paul Bowles was a pioneer in the field of North African ethnomusicology, making field recordings from 1959 to 1961 of traditional Moroccan music for the US Library of Congress. In five months, he managed to document 250 examples, covering some of the most significant Moroccan music genres. The collection includes dance music, secular music, music for Ramadan and other celebrations, and music for animistic rituals. Bowles realised that modern culture would inevitably change and influence the practice of traditional music, and he wanted to preserve some of it.

Bowles commented on the political aspects of the practice of traditional music:

Instrumentalists and singers have come into being in lieu of chroniclers and poets, and even during the most recent chapter in the country's evolution – the war for independence and the setting up of the present regime – each phase of the struggle has been celebrated in song.

The total collection of this recorded music is known as The Paul Bowles Collection; it is archived in the US Library of Congress, Reference No. 72-750123. The Archival Manuscript Material (Collection) contains 97 x 2-track 7" reel-to-reel tapes, containing approximately sixty hours of traditional folk, art and popular music, one box of manuscripts, 18 photographs, and a map, along with the 2-LP recording called Music of Morocco (AFS L63-64).

== Translating other authors ==
In the 1960s Bowles began translating and collecting stories from the oral tradition of native Moroccan storytellers. His most noteworthy collaborators included Mohammed Mrabet, Driss Ben Hamed Charhadi (Larbi Layachi), Mohamed Choukri, Abdeslam Boulaich, and Ahmed Yacoubi.

He also translated writers whose original work was written in Spanish, Portuguese and French: Rodrigo Rey Rosa, Jorge Luis Borges, Jean-Paul Sartre, Isabelle Eberhardt, Roger Frison-Roche, André Pieyre de Mandiargues, Ramón Gómez de la Serna, Giorgio de Chirico, Si Lakhdar, E. Laoust, Ramon Beteta, Gabino Chan, Bertrand Flornoy, Jean Ferry, Denise Moran, Paul Colinet, Paul Magritte, Popul Buj, Francis Ponge, Bluet d'Acheres and Ramón Sender.

== Achievement and legacy ==
Paul Bowles is considered one of the artists to have shaped 20th-century literature and music. In his "Introduction" to Bowles's Collected Stories (1979) Gore Vidal ranked the short stories as "among the best ever written by an American", writing: "the floor to this ramshackle civilization that we have built cannot bear much longer our weight. It was Bowles's genius to suggest the horrors which lie beneath that floor, as fragile, in its way, as the sky that shelters us from a devouring vastness".

Critics have described his music, in contrast, "as full of light as the fiction [is] of dark ... almost as if the composer were a totally different person from the writer." During the early 1930s, Bowles studied composition (intermittently) with Aaron Copland; his music from this period "is reminiscent of Satie and Poulenc." Returning to New York in the mid-30s, Bowles became one of the preeminent composers of American theater music, producing works for William Saroyan, Tennessee Williams, and others, "show[ing] exceptional skill and imagination in capturing the mood, emotion, and ambience of each play to which he was assigned." Bowles said that such incidental music allowed him to present "climaxless music, hypnotic music in one of the exact senses of the word, in that it makes its effect without the spectator being made aware of it." At the same time he continued to write concert music, assimilating some of the melodic, rhythmic, and other stylistic elements of African, Mexican, and Central American music.

In 1991, Bowles was awarded the annual Rea Award for the Short Story. The jury gave the following citation: "Paul Bowles is a storyteller of the utmost purity and integrity. He writes of a world before God became man; a world in which men and women in extremis are seen as components in a larger, more elemental drama. His prose is crystalline and his voice unique. Among living American masters of the short story, Paul Bowles is sui generis."

The historic building of the American Legation in Tangier includes an entire wing devoted to Paul Bowles. In 2010, they received a donation of furniture, photographs and documents compiled by Gloria Kirby, a permanent resident of Tanger and friend of Bowles.

The Library of America published an edition of Bowles's works in 2002.

== Works ==
In addition to his chamber and stage compositions, Bowles published fourteen short story collections, several novels, three volumes of poetry, numerous translations, numerous travel articles, and an autobiography.

=== Music ===
1931 – Sonata for Oboe and Clarinet
1936 – Horse Eats Hat, play
1936 – Who Fights This Battle, play
1937 – Doctor Faustus, play
1937 – Yankee Clipper, ballet
1938 – Music for a Farce
1938 – Too Much Johnson, play
1938 – Huapango – Cafe Sin Nombre – Huapango-El Sol, Latin American folk
1939 – Denmark Vesey, opera
1939 – My Heart's in the Highlands, play
1940 – Loves Old Sweet Song, play
1940 – Twelfth Night, play
1941 – A Little Closer, Please, words by William Saroyan
1941 – Liberty Jones, play
1941 – Watch on the Rhine, play
1941 – Love Like Wildfire, play
1941 – Pastorela, ballet
1942 – In Another Five Years Or So, opera
1942 – The Wind Remains, zarzuela
1943 – South Pacific, play
1943 – Sonata for Flute and Piano and Two Mexican Dances
1943 – 'Tis Pity She's a Whore, play
1944 – The Glass Menagerie, play
1944 – Jacobowsky and the Colonel, play
1944 – Sentimental Colloquy, ballet
1945 – Ondine, play
1945 – Three, words by Tennessee Williams
1945 – Three Pastoral Songs
1946 – Night Without Sleep, words by Charles Henri Ford
1946 – Cyrano de Bergerac, play
1946 – The Dancer, play
1946 – Land's End, play
1946 – On Whitman Avenue, play
1946 – Twilight Bar, play
1946 – Blue Mountain Ballads ("Heavenly Grass", "Lonesome Man", "Cabin", "Sugar in the Cane"), words by Tennessee Williams
1946 – Concerto for Two Pianos
1947 – Sonata for Two Pianos
1947 – Pastorela: First Suite, a ballet/opera in one act
1947 – The Glass Menagerie, words by Tennessee Williams, two songs by Bowles
1948 – Concerto for Two Pianos, Winds and Percussion
1948 – Summer and Smoke, play
1949 – Night Waltz
1953 – A Picnic Cantata
1953 – In the Summer House, play
1955 – Yerma, opera
1958 – Edwin Booth, play
1959 – Sweet Bird of Youth, play
1960 – Gothic Suite ("Testa dell'Efebo", "San Sebastiano di Sodoma", "The Goths", "Faint as Leaf Shadow", "Death is High") words by Tennessee Williams; music composed 1960, published 1984
1962 – The Milk Train Doesn't Stop Here Anymore, play
1966 – Oedipus, play
1967 – The Garden, play
1969 – The Bacchae, play
1976 – Cross Country
1978 – Orestes, play
1978 – Caligula, play
1984 – Camp Cataract, play
1984 – A Quarreling Pair, play
1992 – Hippolytos, play
1992 – Black Star at the Point of Darkness
1993 – Salome, play

=== Fiction ===
==== Novels ====
1949 – The Sheltering Sky
1952 – Let It Come Down
1955 – The Spider's House
1966 – Up Above the World
1991 – Too Far from Home (novella)
1992 – Too Far from Home (with Miquel Barceló; 28 watercolors)
1994 – Too Far from Home (with Marguerite McBey)

==== Short fiction ====
- (December 1945) "The Scorpion"
- (September 1946) "The Echo"
- (October 1946) "By the Water"
- (Jan-Feb 1947) "A Distant Episode"
- (June 1947) "Under the Sky"
- (October 1947) "Call at Corazón"
- (January 1948) "You Are Not I"
- (September 1948) "At Paso Rojo"
- (February 1949) "Pastor Dowe at Tacaté"
- (Summer 1949) "The Delicate Prey"
- (Autumn 1949) "Pages from Cold Point"
- (1950) "Doña Faustina"
- (1950) "The Circular Valley," "The Fourth Day Out from Santa Cruz," "A Thousand Days to Mokhtar," & "Tea on the Mountain"
- (April 1950) "How Many Midnights"
- (July 1950) "Señor Ong and Señor Ha"
- (March 1951) "A Gift for Kinza" (aka "The Successor")
- (April 1954) "If I Should Open My Mouth"
- (1956) "The Hours After Noon"
- (July 1957) "The Frozen Fields"
- (May 1958) "Tapiama"
- (1960) "He of the Assembly"
- (October 1960) "Merkala Beach" (aka "The Story of Lachen and Idir")
- (March 1961) "A Friend of the World"
- (Winter 1962) "The Hyena"
- (Autumn/Winter 1964) "The Garden"
- (Summer 1970) "Afternoon with Antaeus"
- (Spring/Summer 1974) "Mejdoub"
- (Fall 1974) "The Fqih"
- (1975) "The Waters of Izli"
- (January 1976) "Things Gone and Things Still Here"
- (Spring/Summer 1976) "Istikhara, Anaya, Medagan and the Medaganat"
- (January 1977) "Allal"
- (June 1977) "Reminders of Bouselham"
- (Fall 1978) "The Eye"
- (Summer 1979) "Here to Learn"
- (Winter 1979) "Midnight Mass"
- (Spring 1980) "The Dismissal"
- (Summer 1980) "Madame and Ahmed" & "Kitty"
- (July 1980) "Bouayad and the Money"
- (Winter 1980) "The Husband"
- (Winter 1980-81) "At the Krungthep Plaza"
- (1981) "In the Red Room" & "Midnight Mass"
- (Spring 1981) "The Little House," "Rumor and a Ladder," & "Tangier 1975"
- (Autumn 1983) "Massachusetts 1932"
- (1985) "The Empty Amulet"
- (Spring 1985) "Hugh Harper"
- (Fall 1985) "Julian Vreden"
- (January–February 1987) "Unwelcome Words"
- (Spring 1987) "In Absentia"
- (1988) "An Inopportune Visit," "New York 1965," & "Dinner at Sir Nigel's"
- (1992) "Too Far from Home"
- "You Have Left Your Lotus Pods on the Bus"
- (1995) "The Time of Friendship"
- (1998) "The Wind at Beni Midar"

==== Short stories (collections) ====
1950 – A Little Stone
1950 – The Delicate Prey and Other Stories
1959 – The Hours After Noon
1962 – A Hundred Camels in the Courtyard
1967 – The Time of Friendship
1967 – The Garden, theatre play
1968 – Pages from Cold Point and Other Stories
1975 – Three Tales
1977 – Things Gone and Things Still Here
1979 – Collected Stories, 1939–1976
1981 – In the Red Room, published by Sylvester & Orphanos
1981 – Midnight Mass
1982 – Points in Time
1988 – Unwelcome Words: Seven Stories
1988 – A Distant Episode: Selected Stories
1988 – Call at Corazon
1989 – A Thousand Days for Mokhtar
1995 – The Time of Friendship Paul Bowles & Vittorio Santoro

==== Poetry ====
1933 – Two Poems
1968 – Scenes
1972 – The Thicket of Spring
1981 – Next to Nothing: Collected Poems, 1926–1977
1997 – No Eye Looked Out from Any Crevice

=== Translations ===
1946 – No Exit by Jean-Paul Sartre
1952 – The Lost Trail of the Sahara by Roger Frison-Roche
1964 – A Life Full Of Holes by Driss Ben Hamed Charhadi (Larbi Layachi)
1967 – Love with a Few Hairs by Mohammed Mrabet
1969 – The Lemon by Mohammed Mrabet
1969 – M'Hashish by Mohammed Mrabet
1973 – For Bread Alone by Mohamed Choukri
1973 – Jean Genet in Tangier by Mohamed Choukri
1974 – The Boy Who Set the Fire by Mohammed Mrabet
1975 – Hadidan Aharam by Mohammed Mrabet
1975 – The Oblivion Seekers by Isabelle Eberhardt
1976 – Look & Move On by Mohammed Mrabet
1976 – Harmless Poisons, Blameless Sins by Mohammed Mrabet
1977 – The Big Mirror by Mohammed Mrabet
1979 – Tennessee Williams in Tangier by Mohamed Choukri
1979 – Five Eyes by Abdeslam Boulaich, "Sheheriar and Sheherazade" by Mohamed Choukri, "The Half Brothers" by Larbi Layachi, "The Lute" by Mohammed Mrabet, and "The Night Before Thinking" by Ahmed Yacoubi
1980 – The Beach Café & The Voice by Mohammed Mrabet
1982 – The Path Doubles Back by Rodrigo Rey Rosa
1983 – The Chest by Mohammed Mrabet
1983 – Allal by Pociao
1984 – The River Bed by Rodrigo Rey Rosa, (a short story)
1985 – She Woke Me Up So I Killed Her — 16 authors' short stories from various languages
1986 – Marriage With Papers by Mohammed Mrabet
1986 – Paul Bowles: Translations from the Moghrebi by various authors
1988 – The Beggar's Knife by Rodrigo Rey Rosa
1989 – Dust on Her Tongue by Rodrigo Rey Rosa
1990 – The Storyteller and the Fisherman, CD by Mohammed Mrabet
1991 – The Pelcari Project by Rodrigo Rey Rosa
1991 – Tanger: Vues Choisies by Jellel Gasteli
1992 – Chocolate Creams and Dollars by various authors
2004 – Collected Stories by Mohammed Mrabet

=== Travel, autobiography and letters ===
1957 – Yallah, text by Paul Bowles, photos by Peter W. Haeberlin (travel)
1963 – Their Heads are Green and Their Hands Are Blue (travel)
1972 – Without stopping (autobiography)
1990 – Two Years Beside The Strait (autobiography)
1991 – Days: Tangier Journal (autobiography)
1993 – 17, Quai Voltaire (autobiography of Paris, 1931,1932)
1994 – Photographs – "How Could I Send a Picture into the Desert?" (Paul Bowles & Simon Bischoff)
1995 – In Touch – The Letters of Paul Bowles (edited by Jeffrey Miller)
1997 – "Dear Paul - Dear Ned: The Correspondence of Paul Bowles and Ned Rorem"

=== Editions ===
1984 – Paul Bowles Selected Songs (edited by Peter Garland)
1993 – Too Far from Home (edited by Daniel Halpern) ISBN 0-88001-295-1
1994 – The Portable Paul and Jane Bowles (edited by Millicent Dillon)
1995 – Paul Bowles: Music (edited by Claudia Swan) ISBN 0-9648083-0-7
2000 – The Paul Bowles Reader (Peter Owen) ISBN 0-7206-1091-5
2001 – The Stories of Paul Bowles (Ecco) ISBN 0-06-621273-1
2002 – The Sheltering Sky, Let It Come Down, The Spider's House (Daniel Halpern, ed. Library of America) ISBN 1-931082-19-7
2002 – Collected Stories and Later Writings (Daniel Halpern, ed. Library of America) ISBN 1-931082-20-0
2010 – Travels: Collected Writings, 1950–93 (Mark Ellingham, ed. Sort of Books, London) ISBN 978-0-9560038-7-4

=== Selected discography of musical compositions and readings ===
1984 – American Piano Music, Vol. I (Bennett Lerner, Piano), Etcetera Records, KTC 1019
1986 – American Piano Music, Vol. II (Bennett Lerner, Piano), Etcetera Records, KTC 1036
1995 – Paul Bowles, A Musical Portrait (Irene Herrmann, Piano; Mark Brandenburg, Clarinet; Michael McGushin, Piano; Brian Staufenbiel, Tenor; Susan Waller, Flute; Roger Wiesmeyer, Oboe), KOCH International Classics, 3-7343-2H1
1995 – Paul Bowles, Migrations (HCD-Productions: Hermann Kretzschmar, Catherine Milliken, Dietmar Wiesner), Largo Records, 5131
1995 – Paul Bowles, An American in Paris, KOCH International, 3-1574-2
1995 – Paul Bowles, Baptism Of Solitude, Meta Records 9601. Bowles reads his own written works to sound scapes ("sound design") provided by Bill Laswell
1996 – The Music of Paul Bowles (Eos Orchestra), Catalyst Records/ BMG Classics, 09026-68409-2
2016 – Paul Bowles: Complete Piano Works – Vol. 1 (Invencia Piano Duo: Andrey Kasparov & Oksana Lutsyshyn), Naxos Records/ American Classics, 8.559786
2016 – Paul Bowles: Complete Piano Works – Vol. 2 (Invencia Piano Duo: Andrey Kasparov & Oksana Lutsyshyn), Naxos Records/ American Classics, 8.559787

=== Film appearances and interviews ===
Paul Bowles in Morocco (1970), produced and directed by Gary Conklin 57 minutes
Paul Bowles Across the Strait (1983), produced and directed by Eve M. Silvester 33 minutes
"Paul Bowles": South Bank Show London Studios (1988), produced by ITV, directed by Melvyn Bragg, 54 minutes
In 1990 Bernardo Bertolucci adapted The Sheltering Sky into a film in which Bowles has a cameo role and provides partial narration. 132 minutes
"Things Gone and Things Still Here" 1991, Directed by award winning BBC Filmmaker Clement Barclay. This film tries to decode the world of Paul Bowles in a one-hour documentary. Chicago Film festival winner.
"Paul Bowles The Complete Outsider" 1993, by Catherine Hiller Marnow and Regina Weinreich 57 minutes.
"Half Moon" 1995, three stories by Paul Bowles, Frieder Schlaich and Irene von Alberti. First Run Features, 91 minutes
"Halbmond" 1995, German version of "Half Moon", Frieder Schlaich and Irene von Alberti. First Run Features, 90 minutes
"Let It Come Down" 1998, Requisite Productions, Zeitgeist Films, pub. 72 minutes, not rated. – this film is likely the definitive portrait of the author late in life. Directed by Jennifer Baichwal, includes footage of the final meeting between Bowles, William Burroughs, and Allen Ginsberg which took place in 1995 in New York. 72 minutes
"Night Waltz" 2002, Owsley Brown Film of the music of Paul Bowles, with Phillip Ramey and an Interview with Jonathan Sheffer, conductor of the Eos Orchestra. 77 minutes
The Cage Door Is Always Open, 2012
