= You Have Left Your Lotus Pods on the Bus =

Short story by Paul Bowles

- Short story by Paul Bowles
- Country: United States
- Language: English

Publication
- Published in: Things Gone and Things Still Here
- Publication date: 1977

"You Have Left Your Lotus Pods on the Bus" is a short story by Paul Bowles written in Tangiers in 1971 and first published in his short fiction collection Things Gone and Things Still Here (1977) by Black Sparrow Press.

== Plot ==
The story is told from first-person point-of-view by an unnamed narrator "clearly a Bowles persona."

A well-off American is visiting his associate, Brooks, in Bangkok. Brooks, teaching at a Bangkok university, enlists the company of three Buddhist monks acquaintances to accompany them on a day trip to the sacred city of Ayudhaya. Accompanying Brooks is Yamyoung, an ordained monk in his late-twenties, and two novices, Prasert and Vichai. Yamyong is the most proficient in English.

American and Thais begin to appraise one another. The Thai monks are mildly offended to find that the American is residing in an opulent five-star hotel. The American notes that the monks seem malnourished. Erroneous assumptions are made by both the Americans and Thais on cultural conventions regarding tattoos and neckties.

The dietary strictures that govern the monk's eating schedule provokes mild resentments in the Americans, who are accustomed to eating lunch. The monks decline to interrupt their sight-seeing excursions to the local temples, and the meal is delayed. By late afternoon, the Americans are ravenously hungry and insist on eating. A Chinese restaurant is located. The monks order soft-drinks and no more. Yamyong expresses veiled contempt at the Westerner's indulgence in food.

The meal completed, the group embarks by bus for Bangkok. En route, the Americans are appalled that an apparent madman, standing at the back of the bus, screams at the top of his lungs throughout the journey. Only later are the Americans disabused of this misapprehension: the man is an essential employee of the bus company, whose duty is to warn the driver of road hazards. Disoriented and exhausted at day's end, the American is dropped off at his hotel: "When I said good-bye to Yamyong, he replied, I think with a shade of aggrievement: 'Good-bye. You have left your lotus pods on the bus.'"

== Publication history ==
The origins of the story dates from 1966 when Bowles sojourned in Bangkok, Thailand while under contract to Little, Brown publishers to write a book for an international cities series. Though Bowles never completed the project, he based "You Have Left Your Lotus Pods on the Bus" on his experiences in Bangkok, written in 1971 at his residence in Tangiers. The work is essentially autobiographical, in which Bowles serves as the unnamed narrator and his American companion, Brooks, is modeled Bowles's friend and biographer Oliver Evans, who was in Thailand on a Fulbright teacher exchange in the early 1960s.

== Theme ==
The story is a quasi-journalistic examination of the cultural differences that separates a pair of well-to-do American tourists in Bangkok and a trio of Buddhist monks who consent to take them on a day excursion to the sacred city of Ayudhaya. What seems a practical or logical custom to the Thai citizens remains obscure to the Americans, and vice versa.

Biographer Allen Hibbard cites one passage to illustrate the cross-cultural contretemps. The eldest monk, Yamyong, inquires of the American narrator as to the significance of the length and configuration of Western neckties, who responds:

"You mean why do men wear neckties?"

"No. I know that. The purpose is to look like a gentleman." I laughed. Yamyong was not put off.

"I have noticed that some men wear the two ends equal, and some men wear the wide end longer than the narrow, or the narrow longer than the wide…some even with both ends equal reach below the waist. What are the different meanings?'

"There is no meaning." I said. "Absolutely none."

"...I believe you, of course, " Yamyong said graciously. "But we all thought each way had a different significance attached."

Novelist Gore Vidal reports "the day is filled with splendid misunderstandings" and cites an incident in which the Americans observe a raving lunatic at the back of their bus, who screams and gesticulates throughout the journey. Unnerved by his rantings, the American noticed that neither the monks nor the other passengers paid him the slightest attention. When one of the Americans inquires as to what the man was saying, Yamyong explains that he was an employee of the bus service, alerting the driver to approaching highway hazards: "Go into second gear"—"We are coming to a bridge"—"Be careful. People in the road", shouting so that he could be heard at the front of the bus. The American narrator, shaken and perplexed by the episode, departs the bus, leaving behind his collection of lotus pods.

== Sources ==
- Hibbard, Allen. 1993. Paul Bowles: A Study of the Short Fiction. Twayne Publishers. New York. ISBN 0-8057-8318-0
- Hamdaoui, Zoubida. 2013. Themes and Story-Telling Strategies in Paul Bowles's North African Fiction. Tesis Doctoral. University of Granada, Spain. ISBN 978-84-9028-680-7 https://digibug.ugr.es/bitstream/handle/10481/29918/21922500.pdf?sequence=1 Retrieved 19 August 2022.
- Vidal, Gore. 1979. Introduction to Paul Bowles; Collected Stories, 1939-1976. Black Sparrow Press. Santa Rosa. 2001. ISBN 0876853963
