= Allal =

- Short story by Paul Bowles
- Country: United States
- Language: English

Publication
- Published in: Rolling Stone
- Publication date: January 27, 1977

"Allal" is a short story by Paul Bowles written in Tangiers in 1976 and first published in the January 27, 1977 issue of Rolling Stone. It appeared in his short fiction collection Things Gone and Things Still Here (1977) published by Black Sparrow Press.

The story is among several that Bowles wrote concerning "transformation" or an exchange of physical or psychological characteristics between humans and animals.

== Plot ==
Allal is born in a hotel to a fourteen-year-old servant girl. He is informally adopted by the childless cook and his wife when the owner fires the young mother. She returns to her family in Marrakesh and is never seen again.

As the boy grows up, he discovers that he is the object of amusement and scorn among the townspeople, who regard him as "a child of sin" and "a meskhot (italics)- damned". Allal labors for room and board at the hotel, but is denied wages. He moves to town and becomes a brickmaker. He lives in a hut alone. Allal forges a deep and virulent hatred for the townspeople.

A dealer in venomous snakes arrives in town, and Allal volunteers to help the elderly man retrieve his snakes when his two serpents escape from a basket. The local residents, alarmed, drive Allal and the old man away as public nuisances. Allal invites the old man to his dwelling for the night.

The snake dealer assures the youth: "Snakes are like people. You have to get to know them. Then you can be their friend." Allal is intrigued by the snakes, and allows them to be released in the hut to feed them.

Allal discovers he has an overwhelming desire to possess one of the snakes, a red cobra. He devises a scheme to lure the snake from its basket when the old man is asleep. Allal captures the snake and conceals it in a nearby oasis. The next morning the snake dealer is distraught at the loss of his snake, but does not suspect Allal, and departs.

Allal trains the cobra to obey his commands with offerings of milk, eggs and kif paste. The youth also imbibes large servings of kif. In a state of ecstasy, Allal discovers that the snake has coiled itself near his head, and communing with the serpent, he feels himself drawn into the creature through its yellow eye. Upon awakening in the morning, Allal discovers he has exchanged perceptions with the cobra: "he was seeing through the eyes of the snake, rather than through his own." He experiences life through that of the snake.

Allal travels into the town in the shape of a snake. He is detected by a resident, who flees back to town and returns with several others to locate and kill the venomous snake. Allal flees, and bites a child he encounters.

When Allal returns to his home, he discovers the snake in the form of a terrorized, naked youth, "the eyes with no mind behind them."

The townspeople break down the door, the youth rushes out screaming. He is captured and taken to an insane asylum. The men search the hut, and Allal emerges with "the rage that had alway been in his heart" and bites two of the men before his head is severed with an ax.

== Theme ==
The theme of "transference" or "transformation" occurs in several of Bowles's short fiction, including "The Scorpion" (1945), 'The Circular Valley" (1950), "You Are Not I" (1948), "Mejdoub" (1974) and 'Kitty" (1975).

Author Gore Vidal notes a similarity between the metamorphosis of the boy Allal into a cobra and the Toaist tale of the human Chuang Chou and the butterfly:

He woke up with a start...he did not know whether he was Chuang Chou who had dreamed he was a butterfly, or whether he was a butterfly dreaming he was Chuang Chou...This is what is called the transformation of things.

The "anthropomorphism" ends badly for both Allal and the snake. Literary critic Zoubida Hamdaoui writes:

Having swapped bodies, the denouement spelled disaster for both of them. Allal (or the body with the snake's mind) is taken away and shut up in the asylum at Berrechid, north of Marrakech.

Hamdahoui adds that the reader is left with the disturbing suspicion that "the snake had the human Allal in his power" until its head is severed by the townspeople.

== Sources ==
- Bowles, Paul. 2001. Paul Bowles: Collected Stories, 1939-1976. Black Sparrow Press. Santa Rosa. 2001. ISBN 0-87685-396-3
- Hibbard, Allen. 1993. Paul Bowles: A Study of the Short Fiction. Twayne Publishers. New York. ISBN 0-8057-8318-0
- Hamdaoui, Zoubida. 2013. Themes and Story-Telling Strategies in Paul Bowles's North African Fiction. Tesis Doctoral. University of Granada, Spain. ISBN 978-84-9028-680-7 https://digibug.ugr.es/bitstream/handle/10481/29918/21922500.pdf?sequence=1 Retrieved August 19, 2022.
- Vidal, Gore. 1979. Introduction to Paul Bowles; Collected Stories, 1939-1976. Black Sparrow Press. Santa Rosa. 2001. ISBN 0-87685-396-3
