= Blue Mountain Ballads =

Blue Mountain Ballads is a song cycle for a voice and piano composed by Paul Bowles in 1946 on poems by Tennessee Williams, who was his friend and mentor. The extended harmonic language of the piano part allows a large degree of freedom in all four songs. The tonality in the music is obscure in parts, but the harmonic language is accessible to an ear of an average audience of classical music and does not require extended listening experience. The meter and tempo varies within each song separately as well as between the songs. Williams later grouped all the Blue Mountain Ballads poems under that name and published them inside his 1956 book In the Winter of Cities.

== Songs ==
"Heavenly Grass" is a piece for a medium voice (B3–E5) and requires much attention to details. The flowing rhythm requires a good ensemble with a pianist. "Lonesome Man" is a piece for a medium voice (D♭3–E♭4), preferably male, and it contains blues rhythms and harmonies. "Cabin" is a fairly easy, folk-like song for a medium voice (C♯4–C♯5). Finally, "Sugar in the Cane" is a piece for medium or high voices (E4–F♯5). It requires many colors in the voice and good acting, as the song is performed from the perspective of a narrator claiming that they are "hot stuff".
