= The Hyena (short story) =

- Short story by Paul Bowles
- Country: United States
- Language: English

Publication
- Published in: Transatlantic Review
- Publication date: Winter 1962

"The Hyena" is a short story by Paul Bowles. It was first published in Transatlantic Review #11 (Winter 1962). It was later included in his short fiction collection The Time of Friendship (1967) published by Holt, Rinehart and Winston.

== Plot ==
A Hyena engages in perfidy to lure a complacent stork to his lair, invoking the teachings of Islam to ensnare his prey. The stork clings to his moral and religious certitudes, enlisting in his own destruction. When the Hyena returns to feed on the rotting carcass of the stork he "thanks Allah for a nose that can smell carrion on the wind."

== Theme ==
"The Hyena" is one of the three fables that appear in Bowles's short fiction collection The Time of Friendship (1967). The other two are The Successor (1951) and The Garden (1964). The tale conforms structurally to the fairy tale The Gingerbread Man. Biographer Johannes Willem Bertens writes:

The story presents a confrontation between a rather complacent but morally concerned unworldliness and its opposite, amoral worldliness. Not surprisingly, the Hyena wins, not only because he is smarter, but also because of his inner strength..."The Hyena" offers a bleak picture of an amoral world where innocence cannot survive. Bowles expressively withholds judgment, and aloofly records what he considers the state of affairs in the world around him. This is the environment in which Bowles's characters are forced to live.

Biographer Allen Hibbard notes that the story may be viewed as an "anti-fable" in that it rejects morals sanctioned by religious institutions: "'The Hyena' seems to suggest that religion itself, or at least its corrupt manifestations, is a hoax and that we are naive if we do not realize the Manichean principles by which the real world operates." As such, Hibbard discerns Nietzsche's On the Genealogy of Morality outlook Bowles advances in "The Hyena."

Literary critic John Ditsky observes:

The deliberately disgusting imagery which accompanies the ending of "The Hyena" is, in a sense, no more vividly awful than the language heretofore used to accompany the deeds of Bowles's human characters. In a very real sense, "The Hyena" is a bit of an anti-fable: it teaches no lessons to human beings which are extraneous to human nature itself; its "lesson" is, rather, that nature desacralized and devoid of its accretion of imposed myth, or spirituality, becomes free to become itself-whereupon no moral judgments should accrue to the conse- quences of such self-attainment. It is rather like the "is"-philosophy explored in John Steinbeck's fiction and borrowed for the purpose from Steinbeck's friend Ed Ricketts. In such a system, then, no wonder that the time of friendship is attenuated, circumscribed."

== Sources ==
- Bowles, Paul. 2001. Paul Bowles; Collected Stories, 1939-1976. Black Sparrow Press. Santa Rosa. 2001.ISBN 0876853963
- Ditsky, John. 1986. The Time of Friendship: The Short Stories of Paul Bowles. Twentieth Century Literature, 34, no. 3-4 (1986) pp. 373–377.
- Hibbard, Allen. 1993. Paul Bowles: A Study of the Short Fiction. Twayne Publishers. New York. ISBN 0-8057-8318-0
