= Taprobane Island (Weligama) =

Private island off the southern coast of Sri Lanka

Coordinates: 5°58′04″N 80°25′32″E

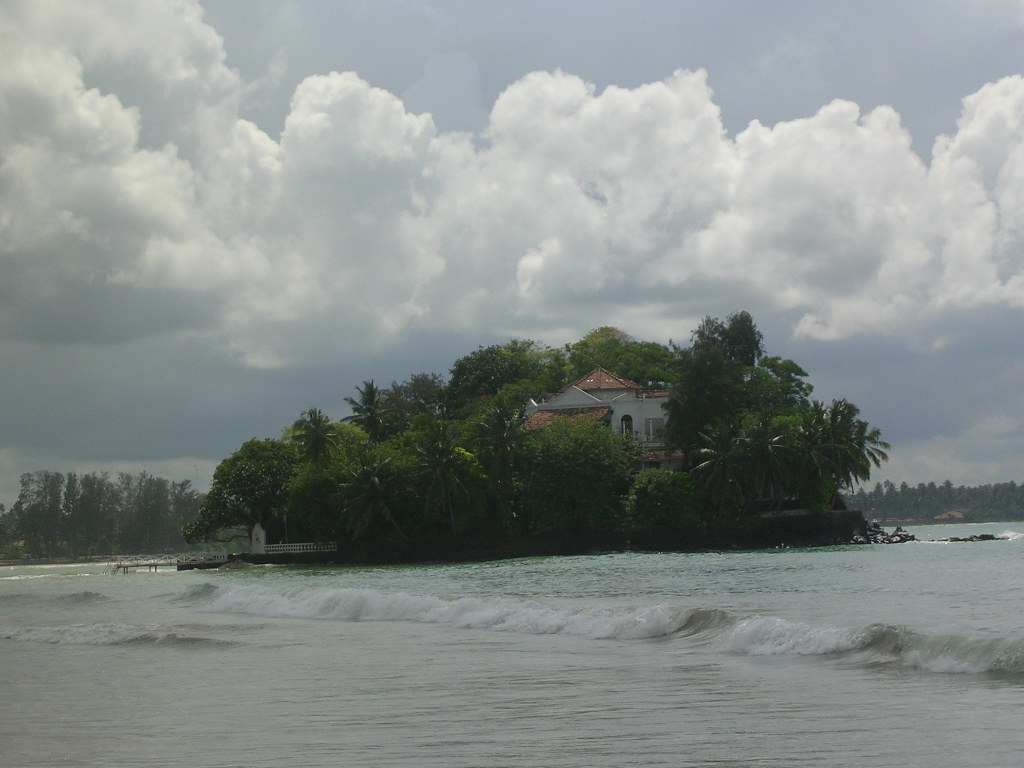
- Interactive map of Taprobane Island

Geography
- Location: Sri Lanka
- Adjacent to: Indian Ocean

Taprobane Island, originally called "Galduwa" ("Rock Island" in Sinhalese), is a private island with one villa, located just off the southern coast of Sri Lanka opposite the village of Weligama.

The island was renamed after the old Greek word for Sri Lanka by its owner Maurice Talvande (who styled himself as "Count de Mauny Talvande"), who sighted it around 1925 after a long search for an earthly paradise. He built its villa and replanted the island to create a private Eden.

The islet was bought by the American author and composer Paul Bowles in 1952, and he completed his novel The Spider's House there in 1955. Tax and other complications forced him to sell the island in 1957 to C.R. "Shaun" Mandy, an Irish writer and editor of the Illustrated Weekly of India. (That same year, Arthur C. Clarke, after visiting it, wrote that, "windows had been boarded up, plaster was flaking away, and though the place was perfectly livable there was a general air of neglect.")

Later, the Sri Lankan-born former United Nations Chief Prosecutor Sir Desmond Lorenz de Silva came to own it through inheritance before it came to the ownership of the Australian businessman Geoffrey Dobbs.

Notable people who stayed on Taprobane include Prince Stanislaus Klossowski de Rola, the son of the painter Balthus, in the 1970s; Dutch author Peter ten Hoopen, who spent a month there in 1984 during civil unrest on the mainland, as well as Kylie Minogue, who composed a song about the island inspired by her stay titled "Taprobane (Extraordinary Day)". German artist Tomas Kurth stayed on Taprobane island in 1991 and, while on the island, painted it numerous times. Subsequently, the stay inspired him to create a series of paintings depicting stylised lonely islands. Taprobane island inspired Jason Kouchak to compose "Dark Island" in his 1999 album Watercolours.

The author Robin Maugham, who visited the island as a young man, and in the mid-1970s, considered the unique beauty and harmony of the villa had become compromised after de Mauny's death, by partitioning and the loss of his furniture and fittings, and that the area itself had been despoiled by the construction of a new road along the mainland beach. Since then, and particularly after the 2004 tsunami, substantial further residential development on the adjoining mainland has occurred.

While Arthur C. Clarke's novel The Fountains of Paradise takes place in "Taprobane", the setting is recognizably Sri Lanka, not this isle.

== Literature ==
- William Warren; Jill Gocher (2007). Asia's legendary hotels: the romance of travel. Singapore: Periplus Editions. ISBN 978-0-7946-0174-4.
- Kim Inglis; Jacob Termansen; Pia Marie Molbech (2004). cool hotels: india, maldives, sri lanka. Singapore: Periplus Editions. ISBN 0-7946-0173-1.
