= Mohamed Mrabet =

Moroccan author, artist and storyteller

- Born: Mohammed ben Chaib el Hajam; March 8, 1936 (age 90); Tangier, Morocco
- Known for: Author, painting

Mohammed Mrabet (born March 8, 1936; né Mohammed ben Chaib el Hajam) is a Moroccan author, artist and storyteller of the Ait Ouriaghel tribe in the Rif region.

Mrabet, mostly known in the West through his association with Paul Bowles, William Burroughs and Tennessee Williams, is an artist of intricate felt tip and ink drawings in the style of Paul Masson or Joan Miró, which have been shown at various galleries in Europe and America. His art work is comparable with that of his contemporary Jillali Gharbaoui (1930–1971). Mrabet is recognized as an important member of a small group of Moroccan master painters who emerged in the immediate post-colonial period and his works have become highly sought after, mostly by European collectors.

== Biography ==
Mohammed Mrabet was born in Tangier, which was an International Zone from 1923 to 1956. His father enrolled him in a Koranic school at the age of four, then in 1943 at L'ecole public de Boukhachkhach. From 1946 to 1950, Mrabet worked as a caddie at the Royal Tangier Golf Club and thereafter as a fisherman, until 1956, when he met an American couple, Russ and Anne-Marie Reeves, at the Café Central in Tangier's Petit Socco, and remained friends with them for several years. They leased the Hotel Muneria (Tangier Inn) in Tangier, and Mrabet worked there as a barman from 1956 to 1959, when he accompanied them to New York, where he stayed with them for several months. His account of his relationship with this couple is semi-fictionalised in his autobiography Look and Move On.

Upon his return to Tangier in 1960, he resumed his life as a fisherman and began to paint (his earliest drawing known to originate in 1959) and met and became friends with Jane Bowles and Paul Bowles, the latter, who, being impressed by his storytelling skills, became the translator of his many prodigious oral tales, which were orated from a distinctive "kiffed" and utterly non-anglicized perspective and published in fourteen different books. Throughout the 1960s until 1992 Mrabet dictated his oral stories (which Bowles translated into English) and continued work with his paintings. His books have been translated into many languages, and in 1991 Philip Taaffe collaborated with Mrabet for the illustrations of his book Chocolate Creams and Dollars. Mrabet continues to paint and holds periodic art exhibitions, mostly in Spain and Tangier. He lives in the Souani area of Tangier with his wife, children and grandchildren.

== Bibliography ==
- Love with a Few Hairs 1967, NY: George Braziller, Translated by Paul Bowles
- M'Hashish 1969, San Francisco, City Lights, Translated by Paul Bowles
- The Lemon 1969, London: Peter Owen, Translated by Paul Bowles
- The Boy Who Set the Fire 1974, Black Sparrow Press, Santa Barbara, Translated by Paul Bowles
- Hadidan Aharam 1975, Black Sparrow Press, Santa Barbara, Translated by Paul Bowles
- Look and Move On 1976, Black Sparrow Press, Santa Barbara, Translated by Paul Bowles
- Harmless Poisons, Blameless Sins 1976, Black Sparrow Press, Santa Barbara Translated by Paul Bowles
- The Big Mirror 1977, Black Sparrow Press, Santa Barbara, Translated by Paul Bowles
- Short story: "The Lute" in Five Eyes 1979, Black Sparrow Press, Santa Barbara, Translated by Paul Bowles
- The Beach Cafe & The Voice 1980, Black Sparrow Press, Santa Barbara, Translated by Paul Bowles
- The Chest 1983, Bolinas, Tombouctou, Translated by Paul Bowles
- Marriage With Papers 1986, Bolinas, Tombouctou, Translated by Paul Bowles
- Chocolate Creams and Dollars 1992, Inanout Press NY, Translated by Paul Bowles
- Collected Stories 2004, Moroccan Cultural Studies Centre, Fez, Morocco, Translated by Paul Bowles
- Le poisson conteur : Et autres stories de Tanger, 2006, Mohammed Mrabet and Eric Valentin, Le bec en l'air éditions

=== Autobiography ===
- Look and Move On 1976, Black Sparrow Press, Santa Barbara

== Books on Mrabet ==
- 2006 – With Much Fire In The Heart: The Letters of Mohammed Mrabet to Irving Stettner by Ron Papandrea
- 2006 – Without Bowles: The Genius of Mohammed Mrabet by Andrew Clandermond and Terence MacCarthy

== Literary criticism and reviews ==
- 1966 – The Spring, In Transatlantic Review, Summer 1966
- 1967 – The Blood Drinker, In The Great Society Issue 2, 1967
- 1971 – The Café, In Vertumnus (Paris) Spring 1971
- 1971 – The Young Man Who Lived Alone, In World of the Short Story April 1971
- 1971 – The Hut, In Mediterranean Review Spring 1971
- 1971 – Si Mokhtar, In Armadillo Fall 1971
- 1972 – Abdesalam and Amar, In Omphalos March 1972
- 1972 – Doctor Safi, In Rolling Stone April 1972
- 1972 – The Dutiful Son, In Bastard Angel, Spring 1972
- 1972 – Bahloul, In Antaeus Summer 1972
- 1977 – El Fellah, In Outlaw Visions 1977
- 1981 – Earth, a play by Mohammed Mrabet, In Conjunctions Issue No 1: (Winter 1981–82)
- 1990 – Mohammed Mrabet's Fiction of Alienation In World Literature Today, Vol. 64, 1990 by Ibrahim Dawood
- 1992 – Paul Bowles/Mohammed Mrabet: Translation, Transformation, and Transcultural Discourse by Richard F. Patteson
- 1999 – On Translating Paul (and Jane and Mrabet) by Claude Nathalie Thomas In Journal of Modern Literature – Volume 23, Number 1, Fall 1999, pp. 35–43
- 2006 – In Defense of Tradition: Mohammed Mrabet's Postcolonial Leanings and the Confrontation of “Kif Wisdom with Modernity by Raj Chandarlapaty

== Art exhibitions including catalogs ==
- 1970 – New York at the Antaeus office, USA
- 1970 – City Lights Bookshop, San Francisco, USA
- 1988 – La Gallerie Paul Mauradian, Lyon France
- 1989 – Cavin-Morris in New York. (Pen and Ink drawings exhibited)
- 1991– La Gallerie Art en Marge, Bruxelles, Belgium
- 1997– Hotel Continental, Tangier, Morocco
- 1998/04 – Akhawain Universite de Ifrane, Morocco
- 1998/08 – Galerie Aplanos, Cultural Museum of Assilah, Morocco
- 1998/09 – Museum of Immigration, Douai, France
- 1999 – University of Charleston, S.C; USA
- 2002 – Galeria Tarifa, Tarifa, Spain
- 2003 – Institut Cervantes, Tangier, Morocco
- 2004 – Darna, Women's Community Centre, Tangier, Morocco
- 2006 – Dawliz Complex, Tangier, Morocco
- 2006 – August The Lawrence-Arnott Art Gallery, Tangier, Morocco
- 2007 – October/November El Minzah Hotel, Tangier, Morocco
