= The Cage Door Is Always Open =

- Directed by: Daniel Young
- Written by: Daniel Young
- Produced by: Valentin Greutert
- Cinematography: Imre Juhasz
- Edited by: Kaya Inan
- Music by: Csaba Kalotás
- Release date: September 25, 2012 (Zurich)
- Country: Switzerland
- Language: English

The Cage Door Is Always Open is a 2012 Swiss documentary film directed by Daniel Young that tells the story of the Tangier-based American writer and composer Paul Bowles.

It had its world premiere at the Zurich Film Festival on 25 September 2012. In February 2013, it was screened at the Berlin International Film Festival and in April of the same year it was released in cinemas in Switzerland.

In addition to the archival footage there are new interviews with John Giorno, Gore Vidal and John Waters among others. It also includes an interview with Bowles conducted by Young two years before Bowles' death.

Production of the film lasted 14 years.
