= The Frozen Fields =

- Short story by Paul Bowles
- Country: United States
- Language: English

Publication
- Published in: Harper's Bazaar
- Publication date: July 1957

"The Frozen Fields" is a short story by Paul Bowles written in 1957 and first published in the July 1957 issue of Harper's Bazaar. The work is included in his collection of short fiction The Time of Friendship (1967) published by Holt, Rinehart and Winston. "The Frozen Fields", an autobiographical piece, is considered one of the 'most powerful" stories in the volume.

== Plot ==
The story is written from a Limited-Omniscient point-of-view, with the six-year-old Donald serving as the focal character.

The six-year-old Donald accompanies his mother and father, residents of New York City, to a family Christmas gathering at the home of his maternal grandparents in rural New England. The boy's father, Owen, is a harsh authoritarian critic of his son, and, in private, is physically abusive towards both Donald and his mother. The boy harbors rebellious thoughts, but fears provoking his father's wrath and copes by becoming detached emotionally. The extended family is aware of the situation, but loath to interfere.

They arrive at the farm on Christmas eve for a supper attended by maternal Uncle Willis and Uncle Greg, who is married to Aunt Emilie. Donald's aunt and uncles treat the boy with affection, the only child at the event. Uncle Ivor and Aunt Louisa, Owen's sister, are expected to arrive Christmas morning, accompanied by Ivor's employer, the well-to-do Mr. Gordon. Ivor is Mr. Gordon's live-in male nurse and presumably his lover. Aunt Louisa lives at a separate residence provided by Mr. Gordon by mutual agreement. The men are rumored to indulge in alcohol and prescription drugs recreationally. The uncles express disapproval of what is considered scandalous arrangement, but Aunt Emilie defends the menage-a-trois. Donald's parents register dismay and indignation, and the boy is put to bed early to shield him from further discussions of the taboo topic. Donald has a waking dream of a wolf who arrives at the farmhouse and seizes his father by the throat, dragging the corpse into the forest.

Aunt Louisa and Uncle Ivor arrive with Mr. Gordon on Christmas morning. Donald, feeling detached from the affair, recognizes a kindred spirit in Mr. Gordon, himself an outsider at the family event. The Christmas tree is raised and gifts are exchanged. The presents from the rural New Englanders reflect their frugality. When Uncle Ivor, dressed as Santa Claus, distributes the presents brought by Mr. Gordon, the company is astonished at his largess: a fur coat and an ornate wristwatch for a delighted Aunt Emilie, and a dozen or so very expensive toys for secretly pleased Donald. The boy's mother feigns appreciation for the gifts but is secretly offended. The father remarks: "It's bad business for a kid to get so much." Donald's parents forbid him to play with his toys. Mr. Gordon remarks quietly: "It's sinister."

When Owen insists that Donald accompany him on a walk in the frigid cold for exercise, his sister Louisa, who has been celebrating the holiday with a large glass of brandy, begs him to reconsider: "Can't you make an exception for Christmas?" A shouting match ensues between the siblings with Louisa, to Donald's consternation, defending him against his father's cruelties. Owen retaliates by alluding disparagingly to the relationship between Ivor and Mr. Gordon, and Louisa's acquiescence in the arrangement. Donald's mother stalks out of the room in shame. Her husband follows his wife upstairs, and Donald imagines him slapping and kicking his mother.

Uncle Ivor invites Donald to join him in the barn to collect chicken eggs. There he gently probes "is your father mean to your mother?" Donald's father bursts into the barn, enraged that his son is conferring with Uncle Ivor, and escorts the boy to a secluded area of the farm. There he berates his son and demands that the boy accurately strike a tree trunk with a snowball. When Donald openly defies his father "for the first time" the enraged Owen smashes a handful of snow into his face, then marches him back to the farm house. The enraged father retreats upstairs.

Aunt Louisa, Uncle Ivor and Mr. Gordon take their leave from the flawed festivities. When Donald's mother prompts her son to thank them for the gifts, Mr. Gordon expresses sympathy for the boy: "He reminds me of myself when I was his age…sort of quiet and shy..."

After their departure, the father joins the company for supper and makes no further contact with his son. That night, Donald dreams of a visit by an affectionate wolf, who joins him in the forest, and they run together across the frozen fields.

== Publication background ==
Bowles conceived and completed writing "The Frozen Fields" while aboard a steamer en route to Sri Lanka during the winter of 1956-57. Bowles recalled a childhood incident at his grandparents' "Happy Hollow Farm" in Massachusetts:

I was lying awake at night in this cold room…very early before dawn I heard a fox howling, barking outside. On shipboard I remembered it: I was just there, and I suddenly thought of the fox howling - I'll never know why...I went every afternoon after lunch and wrote and had it all done, and when I got to Columbo I sent "The Frozen Fields" right off to New York, and it was immediately published in Harper's Bazaar...

The story was included in The Best Short Stories of '58 anthology.

== Theme ==
When Donald arrives at his grandparents' farm in rural New England for the Christmas celebration with his mother, he exults in the "enchanted" and "magic" world it offers him. As the only child present at the gathering, he is doted upon by his aunts and uncles. Bowles announces the central theme of the story when the boy registers the arrival of his father:

...His father's presence here would constitute a grave danger, because it was next to impossible to conceal anything from him, and once aware of the existence of the other world he would spare no pains to destroy it.

Biographer Allen Hibbard associates this theme with "the nature of authority and the threat the father poses to the child's imaginative world", calling into question the legitimacy of "the institution of the family."

An implicit bond establishes between the young Donald and Mr. Gordon. Though not a family relation, this wealthy employer is a patron to Donald's maternal Uncle Ivor, husband to his Aunt Louise. Ivor serves as Gordon's male nurse and homosexual lover. Donald's mother alludes to the relationship on Christmas eve: "I don't know how Louise stands it!" The bejeweled Mr. Gordon discomfits the adults in the family, but Donald is intrigued by him, who recognizes him as a fellow outsider. Gordon's "regal, even queenly" manner and his distribution of expensive gifts permits him a proprietary and familiar attitude towards the countrified and frugal New Englanders. He makes pointed observations about Donald's parents' methods of rearing their son. When Donald is ordered by his parents not to play with the expensive Christmas gifts bestowed by Mr. Gordon, the boy obediently complies. An exchange between his father and Mr. Gordon follows:

After a moment Mr. Gordon said under his breath: "Well, I'll be damned." Then to Donald's father: "I've seen some well-behaved kids in my time, but I don't mind telling you I've never seen one like that. Never."

"Discipline begins in the cradle," said his father shortly.

"It's sinister," Mr. Gordon murmured to himself.

Donald glanced up and saw his father looking at Mr. Gordon with hatred.

Uncle Ivor is also a critic of the boy's father, his brother in-law, and attempts to privately question Donald about any domestic violence at home. The father interrupts the interview and takes the child to a secluded location on the farm and berates - then assaults him - violently shoving a snowball in his face: "He was certain his father was trying to kill him."

The denouement unfolds after this climax, as Donald returns to the farmhouse. Allen Hibbard points to the autobiographical elements of "The Frozen Fields':

Following this incident [the father's brutal assault on his son] Donald, feeling a sense of detachment from the whole scene, is surprised by his lack of resentment. This description sheds light on Bowles's own modus operandi. One is often struck by how much the man has been able to detach himself from painful or intimate experiences. Those mechanisms for coping may have their origins in childhood experience, as might the impulse to give experience some kind of objective, literary form…Bowles has chosen, in the interest of art, to distance himself from family, country and religion.

The story closes with Donald retreating into the "world of his own imagination" dreaming in his sleep of an alliance with a wolf, the "primitive forces" that stand in opposition to his father's "brutal civilizing schemes":

The wolf was out there in the night…stopping to drink at the deep places in the brook where the ice had not formed…he shook his coat and climbed to the place where Donald was waiting for him. Then he lay down beside him, putting his heavy head in Donald's lap. Donald leaned over and buried his face in the shaggy fur of his scruff. After a while they both got up and began to run together, faster and faster, across the field.

== Sources ==
- Bowles, Paul. 2001. Paul Bowles; Collected Stories, 1939-1976. Black Sparrow Press. Santa Rosa. 2001.ISBN 0876853963
- Ditsky, John. 1986. The Time of Friendship: The Short Stories of Paul Bowles. Twentieth Century Literature, 34, no. 3-4 (1986) pp. 373-377.
- Foltz, Anne. 2000. The Review of Contemporary Fiction (Volume 20, Issue 2). Summer, 2000. https://link.gale.com/apps/doc/A63940711/AONE?u=mlin_oweb&sid=googleScholar&xid=271212bc Retrieved August 10, 2022.
- Hibbard, Allen. 1993. Paul Bowles: A Study of the Short Fiction. Twayne Publishers. New York. ISBN 0-8057-8318-0
