= Abdeslam Boulaich =

Moroccan story-teller, some of

Abdeslam Boulaich (Arabic: عبد السلام بولعيش) is a Moroccan story-teller, some of whose stories have been translated by Paul Bowles from Moroccan Arabic to English. Boulaich's stories have been studied in college courses.
