= The Hours After Noon =

Short story by Paul Bowles

- Short story by Paul Bowles
- Country: United States
- Language: English

Publication
- Published in: Zero Anthology of Literature and Art #8
- Publication date: 1956

"The Hours After Noon" is a short story by Paul Bowles. It was first published in 1956 in Zero Anthology of Literature and Art #8, ed. Themistocles Hoetis (New York: Zero Press). It later appeared in his collection of short fiction, The Time of Friendship (1967), published by Holt, Rinehart and Winston.

The story was completed in Tangier and Paris in 1950, during the same period that Bowles was writing many of the pieces that would appear in The Delicate Prey and Other Stories (1950).

== Plot ==
The story is set in Tangier, Morocco. The point-of-view is in the third-person Omniscient. and opens In medias res. The work is divided into 8 sections.

Section 1: Mrs. Callender, of English and Spanish descent operates the Pension Callender, with her American husband. She caters to Western expatriates. Socially, Mrs. Callendar is a thorough reactionary on social matters related to sex and gender: "while a boy should have complete liberty, a girl should have none at all." Her daughter, Charlotte, is soon to arrive from London on her summer break from boarding school. Mrs. Callendar is anxious at the imminent arrival of the 50-something pensioner Monsieur Royer, a seasonal patron who she considers a disreputable "cad." He has the reputation of being a pedophile. She fears that he will behave disgracefully towards the pretty and chaste Charlotte. Mr. Callender is more lenient on these matters and gently reprimands his wife. The young Mr. Van Siclen is an American archeologist working on an excavation site at the village of El Menar. Mrs. Callendar confides her hostility to Royer with the handsome Van Siclen, and he casually assures her that the villagers of El Menar would leave a child molester "behind a rock with a coil of wire around his neck."

Section 2: Monsieur Royer arrives in Tangiers from his sojourn in Spain. He is escaping "prudishness he so hated" and relishes the prospect of making casual sexual conquests in Morocco. A sensualist, he revels in the scent of a jasmine garden. When a little boy persistently entreats him for alms, Royer delivers a violent blow to the child's face. After a moment of regret, Royer approaches the stunned urchin, and in a fit of rage, strikes him again and departs indignantly, "considering himself a particularly understanding friend of the Moslems." He arrives at the Callendar pension and checks in.

Section 3: Charlotte is en route by airplane from London to Tangiers. A dutiful daughter, she recognizes her obligation to visit her parents. Her relationship with her father is satisfactory: he recognizes her "as a fully formed individual." Charlotte is deeply troubled at the prospect of facing her overbearing and controlling mother. She is torn between feelings of guilt and a desire to resist. She arrives at the pensione with apprehensions about an impending struggle.

Section 4: Mrs. Callender and Charlotte are seated in the dining room. Monsieur Royer, at another table, lingers over his meal and eavesdrops on their conversation. Mrs. Callendar makes no effort to introduce him to Charlotte. Mr. Van Siclen arrives from El Menar. He is introduced to Charlotte and acknowledges her "with a minimum of civility." Mrs. Callender gushes over the archeologist. Charlotte's assessment of Van Siclen is at odds with her mother's: "He summed up all the things she disliked most in men: conceit, brashness, and insensitivity." Her dismay at her mother's apparent "denial of all values" fills Charlotte with a sense of guilt and rebelliousness. Mr. Royer suddenly approaches Charlotte and introduces himself. Mrs. Callendar is furious, but remains silent. After a few pleasantries, he departs. Charlotte is favorably impressed with "the French gentleman" but her parents assure her he is a man of low character. Mrs. Callender insists that Charlotte retire for the night. Resisting weakly, the daughter submits.

Section 5: Charlotte, unable to sleep, dresses and slips out of the house furtively. She encounters Van Siclen on the road. He remarks "I saw you come sneaking out." She finds him offensive, but when he seized her by the arm and insisted they take a ride in his jeep, she acquiesces, not wishing to appear "a whining creature - a poor sport." He takes her on a high-speed trip out of town. At a remote location, he tauntingly interrogates Charlotte as to her virtuousness. When she expresses disgust, he grabs her and bites her lip, drawing blood. He offers a handkerchief and chides her "Ah, it wasn't as bad as all that…As a matter of fact, this ride was good for you." Van Siclen drives Charlotte back to the pension.

Section 6: Charlotte rises the next morning and goes to the beach to swim and sunbathe. She does not inform her parents about the sexual assault. She encounters Royer, who amuses her with pleasantries and compliments on her "mermaid"-like beauty, which Charlotte finds inoffensive. On an impulse, and desperate for advice on the assault, she asks: "Do you think it's despicable for a man to kiss a girl against her will?" Royer utterly misapprehends the purpose of her query, believing it arises from disparaging remarks made about him by the guests at the pension. He answers the question: For a man to assault a girl "against her will" is "despicable", but local peasant girls and women of the "lower class" deserve no such immunity. He politely but indignantly takes his leave, despite Charlotte's heartfelt apologies. At that moment, Mrs. Callender appears, outraged at the proximity of Royer to her daughter. After Royer is gone, she launches into a tirade of denunciations against her daughter: "You're thoroughly thoughtless and egotistical." Mother and daughter engage in a protracted contretemps: Charlotte defending Royer, and Mrs. Callender assuring her that he will "ruin your life." That afternoon, Charlotte defiantly joins Royer at tea, but her mother declines to intervene.

Section 7: Mrs. Callendar is obsessed with her daughter's "infatuation" with Royer. She insists that he be dismissed from the pension, but Mr. Callender vetoes this draconian tactic. In desperation Mrs. Callendar enlists Van Siclen to entice Monsieur Royer to the excavation camp for several days to detach him from the pension. Van Siclen reluctantly consents. When Charlotte discovers Royer and Van Siclen's departure, she is nonplussed. Her mother interprets this lack of reaction as contrived: "She's rather a little sneak." Next morning, Charlotte goes into town and accidentally meets Van Siclen. He adopts a proprietary and familiar attitude, accusing her of harboring "hard feelings'" due to her coolness towards him. She accepts a short ride from him. When Charlotte does not return for lunch, Mrs. Callender becomes concerned. She becomes hysterical when an employee informs her that she was with Van Siclen that morning, assuming her daughter is making contact with Royer. She orders her employee to drive her to the remote village of El Menar immediately.

Section 8: Mrs. Callender arrives at El Menar after nightfall. She confronts Van Siclen: "Where's my daughter?" Momentarily alarmed that his assault on Charlotte had been exposed, he recovers and informs Mrs. Callender that Monsieur Royer is missing. He has made enquiries among the local residents, but nobody is talking. Mrs. Callender has a premonition that Royer has indulged in a pedophilic act. They depart for the pension. Royer is indeed nearby, in the company of a peasant child, and observes the departing vehicle. Moments later he is descended upon by local residents who kill him.

== Publication history ==
One of the longest stories in the collection The Time of Friendship, the work may be termed a short novella. The provenance of its writing is not clear. A corrected transcript for "The Hours After Noon" reads 'Fez, May 14, 1949, while the version that appears in his Collected Stories, 1939-1976 reports that the work was completed in "Paris-Tangiers, 1950." The setting for the story, the Pension Callender, was an actual residence where Bowles roomed while staying in Tangier's International Zone in the post-war period

== Theme ==
The central theme of "The Hours After Noon" is derived from the relationship between Prospero and his daughter Miranda in Shakespeare's The Tempest (1611): "How to introduce innocence to experience without tremendous or irreparable harm." Bowles applies this theme to a mother-daughter relationship, where Mrs. Callender's paranoiac protectiveness of Charlotte is a reflection of her own "aching nostalgia for her own youth" and the anxiety at passing beyond middle-age, the "Hours After Noon" in the title.

Bowles links Royer's sordid demise is his failure to escape his "existential torment"—a torment that Mrs. Callender also suffers—and to acknowledge "human unity." The key to the protagonist's redemption is embodied in an epigraph Bowles provides by the poet Charles Baudelaire:

If one could awaken all the echoes of one's memory simultaneously, they would make a music, delightful or sad as the case may be, but logical and without dissonances. No matter how incoherent the existence, the human unity is not affected.

Moments before Royer is murdered, he struggles to reconstruct a passage from Andre Gide's work on the legends of Amyntas: "Time passing here is innocent of hours, yet so perfect is our inoccupation that boredom becomes impossible."

== Sources ==
- Bowles, Paul. 2001. Paul Bowles; Collected Stories, 1939-1976. Black Sparrow Press. Santa Rosa. 2001.ISBN 0-87685-396-3
- Ditsky, John. 1986. The Time of Friendship: The Short Stories of Paul Bowles. Twentieth Century Literature, 34, no. 3-4 (1986) pp. 373-377.
- Hibbard, Allen. 1993. Paul Bowles: A Study of the Short Fiction. Twayne Publishers. New York. ISBN 0-8057-8318-0
- Vidal, Gore. 1979. Introduction to Paul Bowles; Collected Stories, 1939-1976. Black Sparrow Press. Santa Rosa. 2001. ISBN 0-87685-396-3
