= Up Above the World =

1966 novel by Paul Bowles

- First edition
- Author: Paul Bowles
- Language: English
- Publisher: Simon and Schuster
- Publication date: 1966
- Publication place: United States
- Media type: Print (hardback)
- ISBN: 979-8212037945

Up Above the World is a novel by Paul Bowles first published in 1966 by Simon and Schuster and in Great Britain by Peter Owen Publishers in 1967. Up Above the World was the last of Bowles's four novels.

== Plot summary ==
In the middle of their journey Dr Slade and his wife have a chance encounter with an important looking lady who tells them that she is going to visit her son. Arriving by ship at a provincial town in an unnamed Latin American country, they find that accommodation is sparse, and so Mrs Slade agrees to share a room with her at some seedy hotel for just one night. During that night, the lady is murdered with an injection of curare, but when the Slades leave very early the next morning to catch a connection, Mrs Slade erroneously believes the woman lying next to her is still fast asleep.

A few days later, in another town, they read in the paper that the hotel burned down immediately after they had left and that the woman died in the fire. No one suspects the real reason, arson, which was committed to cover up the murder. This is when Dr and Mrs Slade make the acquaintance of Grove Soto, a charming and seemingly rich young man who offers them his hospitality. When it turns out that the recently deceased woman was his mother and Soto feigns shock at her premature death, the Americans have no idea that it was actually him who had her killed out of greed.

As Soto cannot be certain about Mrs Slade's complete ignorance of the crime, he extends his hospitality, invites them to his farm in the country and eggs them on to stay there longer than they have planned. At the same time, with the help of both his local household staff and his seventeen-year-old Cuban lover Luchita, he feeds them a cocktail of drugs whose effects, including partial amnesia, the innocent Americans mistake for the symptoms of a heavy virus infection, recovery from which is supposedly slow.

In the end Dr Slade, who has been barely conscious for days, disappears, while his young wife suspects more and more sinister forces to be at work. She escapes to the nearest town, where a fiesta is being held, only to realize that Soto has also planned her very escape. Without seeing her husband again, she has to face both her adversary and her own destiny amid the cheering townspeople.

== Critical Assessment ==
Though Bowles was gratified with the literary quality of his fourth and final novel Up Above the World (though initially unhappy with the title) he remarked in 1988:

As far as the novels go, what I like best is Up above the World because it's the best written. After all, what one writes for is to write well, to use the language well, to make the words tell the most they can, in the smallest number . . .

Literary critic Colm Tóibín observes that “Despite Bowles's high opinion of the writing, there are passages of great rhythmic tedium followed by passages of an almost exquisite banality.”

Literary critic Francis Fytton, in The London Magazine writes:

Up Above the World is indeed the first time that Bowles has attempted to reconcile his hallucinatory writing with the purely communicative; and the result, though his best-written work so far, is confusion…His gifts of fantasy, of confronting the reader with the unexpected, of making him look into a distorting mirror, are very high; but he cannot explain the inexplicable. At present he seems to be aiming at an intimacy which cannot be shared by the un-addicted...”

Conrad Knickerbocker of The New York Times writes:

One of Mr. Bowles's chief talents lies in the slow, artful building of tension, a gradual crescendo of seemingly harmless details that works up to a scream. He achieves this effect through the use of a pitiless, flat, matter-of-fact style, almost toneless, that withholds emotion even at the crucial junctures...In Up Above the World Mr. Bowles performs like a musician who has fallen in love with one tune which he plays magnificently, but over and over again. The novel is lopsided, 193 pages of tension and 26 pages of release. When it does finally come, the relief is so banal that it is an anti-climax.

Knickerbocker adds: “Still, Up Above the World is worth reading, if only to see how a first-rate writer goes about creating the environment of menace. And Mr. Bowles's theme, the destruction of innocence, is defined, if not resolved, with an ability that once more confirms his stature.”

== Read on ==
- A similar noir atmosphere around a local fiesta was created by Dorothy B. Hughes in her 1946 novel, Ride the Pink Horse.
- Amnesia plays a decisive role in John Franklin Bardin's 1946 novel, The Deadly Percheron.

== Sources ==
- Bowles, Paul. 2001. Paul Bowles; Collected Stories, 1939-1976. Black Sparrow Press. Santa Rosa. 2001.ISBN 0-87685-396-3
- Fytton, Francis. 1967. The Pipe Dreams of Paul Bowles. London Magazine. February, 1967. https://www.enotes.com/topics/paul-bowles/critical-essays/bowles-paul-1910-1 Retrieved 10 July 2022.
- Hibbard, Allen. 1993. Paul Bowles: A Study of the Short Fiction. Twayne Publishers. New York. ISBN 0-8057-8318-0
- Knickerbocker, Conrad. 1966. The Destruction of Innocence. The New York Times. 12 March 1966. https://archive.nytimes.com/www.nytimes.com/books/98/05/17/specials/bowles-world.html Retrieved 19 July 2022.
- Tóibín, Colm. 2007. Avoid the Orient. Review, Paul Bowles: A Life, by Virginia Spencer Carr. London Review of Books, Vol. 29 No. 1, 4 January 2007. https://www.lrb.co.uk/the-paper/v29/n01/colm-toibin/avoid-the-orient Retrieved 11 July 2022.
