= Wendy Lesser =

American novelist

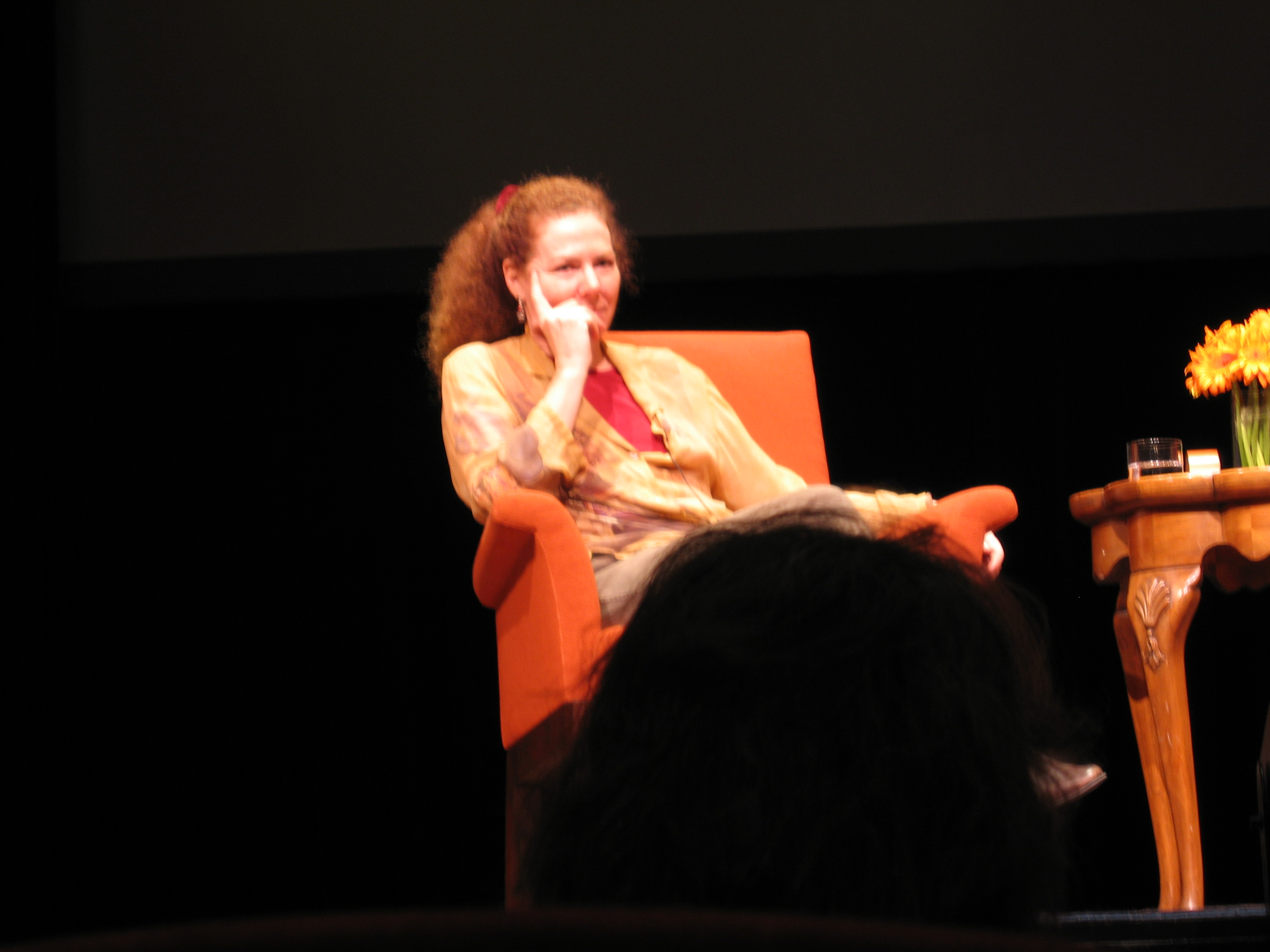
- Born: March 20, 1952 (age 74); Santa Monica, California, U.S.
- Education: Harvard University (BA); King's College, Cambridge (BPhil); University of California, Berkeley (PhD)
- Relatives: Millicent Dillon (mother)
- Writing career
- Genre: non-fiction

Wendy Lesser (born March 20, 1952) is an American critic, writer, and editor based in Berkeley, California. She is the founding editor of the arts journal The Threepenny Review, and the author of a novel and several works of nonfiction, including most recently a biography of the architect Louis Kahn, for which she won the 2017 Marfield Prize.

== Biography ==
Lesser was born in 1952 in Santa Monica, California and moved in 1955 to Palo Alto, California, where she was raised. She is the daughter of Murray Lesser, an engineer and writer, and Millicent Dillon, a writer. She earned a B.A. at Harvard University in 1973; a B.Phil. at King's College, Cambridge, in 1975; and a Ph.D. at the University of California, Berkeley, in 1982.

She is the author of several books, including a novel, The Pagoda in the Garden (Other Press, 2005), and the nonfiction book Why I Read (Farrar, Straus & Giroux, 2014).

She is a member of the American Academy of Arts and Sciences, and has received fellowships from the Guggenheim Foundation, National Endowment for the Humanities, the Dedalus Foundation, and the New York Public Library's Cullman Center for Scholars and Writers, among other places.

== Works ==
- The Life Below the Ground: A Study of the Subterranean in Literature and History (1987)
- His Other Half: Men Looking at Women Through Art Harvard University Press, 1991. ISBN 9780674392113, OCLC 59903884
- Pictures at an Execution Cambridge, Mass. : Harvard University Press, 1994. ISBN 9780674667365, OCLC 38972017
- A Director Calls Berkeley : University of California Press, 1997. ISBN 9780520212060, OCLC 611228387
- The Amateur: An Independent Life of Letters New York : Vintage Books, 1999. ISBN 9780375703812, OCLC 44405154
  - Портрет балерины (Tamara Toumanova)
- Nothing Remains the Same: Rereading and Remembering Boston [u.a.] : Houghton Mifflin, 2002. ISBN 9780618340811, OCLC 798974644
- The Pagoda in the Garden New York : Handsel Books, 2005. ISBN 9781590511763, OCLC 795582468
- Room for Doubt New York : Pantheon Books, 2007. ISBN 9780375424007, OCLC 636819815
- Music for Silenced Voices: Shostakovich and His Fifteen Quartets New Haven, Conn. : Yale University Press, 2011. ISBN 9780300169331 , OCLC 770869230
- Why I Read: The Serious Pleasure of Books New York : Picador/Farrar, Staus and Giroux, 2014. ISBN 9781250062093, OCLC 898154175
- You Say to Brick: The Life of Louis Kahn New York : Farrar, Straus and Giroux, 2017. ISBN 9780374537630, OCLC 988048542
- Scandinavian Noir: In Pursuit of a Mystery. New York : Farrar, Straus and Giroux, 2020, ISBN 9780374216979
