= Tapiama =

Short story by Paul Bowles

- Short story by Paul Bowles
- Country: United States
- Language: English

Publication
- Published in: The London Magazine
- Publication date: May 1958

"Tapiama" is a short story by Paul Bowles. It was first published in May 1958 by John Lehmann in The London Magazine. It later appeared in the collection of his short fiction, The Hours After Noon, published by the Heinemann in 1959. The story was subsequently published in A Distant Episode: The Selected Stories by Ecco Press in 1988.

== Plot ==
Told in the third-person, the story unfolds in an unidentified country in Latin America.

An unnamed professional American photographer, traveling alone, arrives in a small town of Tapiama (a fictional location). He takes lodging in a cheap hotel, and awakes in the middle of the night plagued by the humidity, heat, insects and mild intestinal pain. To escape these discomforts, he dresses and embarks on a stroll along the deserted sea front in the darkness. He considers removing his clothing to enhance his sudden sense of "pure freedom." Violating his own self-imposed limit to his walk ("fifteen minutes"), he approaches a glowing bonfire in the distance: a small craft is floating near the beach. When the photographer approaches, the naked boatman inquires "Tapiama? Vas a Tapiama?. On an impulse the American boards the craft. He is entirely ignorant of its destination. About an hour later the boat arrives at a primitive cantina frequented by laborers employed by a sugar processing plant, the fictional Compañía Azucarera Riomartillense.

Identifying himself as a Dane to conceal his American citizenship ("they don't like millionarios [i.e.Americans] here, you know" he is warned), the photographer enters the establishment. He begins to consume servings of the cumbiamba , "the coastal region's favorite drink, a herbal concoction famous for its treacherous effects." The beverage produces hallucinogenic-like sensations, and the photographer slowly descends into a paranoiac stupor. He interacts with a number of the denizens of the cantina: a supercilious and hostile off-duty Latin soldier, an expatriate American from Milwaukee, a local female prostitute. He becomes increasingly alarmed about his mental state, and is warned of the physical danger that threatens him: "These guys mean trouble from the word go." The photographer reflects: "This is not going to work out right, at all. It's just not going to work out."

At dawn he flees the cantina, now appearing to him as a phantasmagoria of hellish sounds and images, and staggers back to the boat. He is ferried from the shore by a group of local workers, his fate unknown.

== Publishing history ==
In late 1957 Bowles contracted Asian flu while visiting London with author and spouse Jane Bowles. Suffering from high fever and delirium, Bowles conceived a short story that involves a protagonist who imbibes a South American alcoholic concoction with hallucinogenic effects, the "cumbiamba", a strictly literary invention. Entitled "Tapiama", Bowles reported that it was "the only fever-directed piece I had ever written."

== Style ==
Paul Bowles, in his 1988 introduction to A Distant Episode: The Selected Stories, by Ecco Press remarked:

Creativity is an eruption of the unconscious. Exposed to the light of reason, this subterranean material ordinarily discovers the uses to which it will be put. The author, aware of what he is doing, gives it an argument and a voice…Most of the tales in the collection adhere to this formula. There is, however, another way of treating this element…Here the author remains ignorant of what he has written, and is not likely to be able to assign a "meaning" to it…"Tapiama" is an example of this approach.

== Sources ==
- Hibbard, Allen. 1993. Paul Bowles: A Study of the Short Fiction. Twayne Publishers. New York. ISBN 0-8057-8318-0
- Vidal, Gore. 1979. Introduction to Paul Bowles; Collected Stories, 1939-1976. Black Sparrow Press. Santa Rosa. 2001. ISBN 0-87685-396-3
