= George Davis (editor) =

American novelist

George Garfield Davis
- Born: February 4, 1906; Chicago, Illinois, U.S.
- Died: November 25, 1957 (aged 51); Berlin, Germany
- Resting place: Ludington, Michigan
- Occupations: Novelist and Editor
- Spouse: Lotte Lenya (m. 1951; died 1957)
- Writing career
- Notable work: The Opening of a Door (1931)

George Davis (February 4, 1906 – November 25, 1957) was an American magazine editor and author. He held editorial roles at Harper's Bazaar and Mademoiselle. In addition to his editorial work, he was a fiction writer.

== Early life ==
Davis was born on February 4, 1906, in Chicago, Illinois to Canadian immigrants. He was the youngest son of five boys and one older sister, who died of diphtheria before his birth. His father worked nights as a pharmacist while attending medical school at the University of Illinois College of Physicians and Surgeons of Chicago. In 1910, the family moved to Clinton, Michigan.

In 1918, the family moved to Highland Park, Michigan, located in central Detroit. Soon after, Davis enrolled in Tilden Elementary School. After graduating from Tilden in 1919, Davis attended Central High School, from which he did not graduate.

Davis entered Detroit City College (now Wayne State University), but left for Chicago shortly after enrolling. In Chicago, Davis worked in the office of a steel company before taking a job in the book department of Marshall Field & Company. In December 1926, Davis asked his father for permission and money to move to Paris to join the growing post-war community of American expatriate writers and artists there. His father accepted, and in 1927, Davis traveled to France, where he began work on his novel The Opening of a Door.

== Literary career ==
=== The Opening of a Door ===
His only novel, The Opening of a Door, was published in 1931 by Harper Brothers to critical acclaim. The novel explores the hypocrisies and tragedies of midwestern middle-class life. Although the novel was well received at the time, it did not achieve much lasting popularity. It has been retrospectively labeled a "lost gay novel" for its serious depiction of homosexuality in American culture, one of the first novels to do so.

=== Editorship ===
Davis served as a fiction editor for Harper's Bazaar from 1936 to 1941. After leaving Harper's, he was an editor for Mademoiselle for eight years. Davis helped to introduce new literary figures to women's magazines. Through his editorship, Davis supported literary figures such as Truman Capote, Ray Bradbury, Jane Bowles, and Robert Lowry.

=== February House ===
In October 1940, Davis and his several friends, including Gypsy Rose Lee, founded an art commune at 7 Middagh Street in Brooklyn Heights, New York. It was dubbed "February House" by Anaïs Nin due to many of its residents having February birthdays. The space housed literary figures including Benjamin Britten, W. H. Auden, and Carson McCullers as live-in guests. A study of the house entitled February House was published in 2005.

== Personal life ==
Davis was a homosexual. However, he was married to Lotte Lenya, an Austrian singer and actress, for six years prior to his death.

=== Death ===
Davis died of a heart attack in Berlin, Germany, on November 25, 1957. During the time before his death, he helped his wife record music.

== Davis in literature ==
Truman Capote satirized George Davis in the character "Boaty" in his unfinished novel Answered Prayers.
