= Midnight Mass (short story collection) =

Volume of short fiction

- First edition cover
- Author: Paul Bowles
- Language: English
- Publisher: Black Sparrow Press
- Publication date: January 1, 1981
- Publication place: United States
- Media type: Trade paperback
- Pages: 181
- ISBN: 978-0876854785

Midnight Mass is a collection of 12 works of short fiction by Paul Bowles, published in 1981 by Black Sparrow Press. The volume is the fifth collection of Bowles's work, much of which is re-published material.

== Stories ==
- "Midnight Mass"
- "The Little House"
- "The Dismissal"
- "Here to Learn"
- "Madame and Ahmed"
- "Kitty"
- "The Husband"
- "At the Krungthep Plaza"
- "The Empty Amulet"
- "Bouayad and the Money"
- "Rumor and a Ladder"
- "The Eye"
- "In the Red Room"

== Critical assessment ==
Biographer Allen Hibbard reports that Midnight Mass offers "many splendid stories, demonstrating the author's versatility and mastery of the genre...his characteristic sense of sureness and economy is as sharp as ever." Literary critic Francine Prose, commenting on"The Eye", a detective-like tale from the volume, writes:

What is immediately striking--and particularly characteristic of Bowles's fiction--is the distanced, clinical, quietly confident, and authoritative tone; the rigorously unadorned, quasi-journalistic prose style; the sleek, controlled elegance of his sentences...Bowles's approach to his material and to his characters is relentlessly anthropological, unbiased by either contempt and derision on the one hand or by sympathy and affection on the other, reflecting no particular tribal loyalties of his own.

Prose argues that the "complex and relatively genial" story "Here to Learn" provides a corrective to a literary article of faith:

Bowles's stories give the lie to the platitudes of those earnest creative-writing instructors who like to tell their students that the well-done short story requires its protagonists to be transformed in the course of the narrative, to experience some life-altering (and preferably life-affirming) Joycean epiphany. Few of Bowles's characters end up any wiser than they were when they began...

Author and literary editor John Updike selected "In the Red Room" for inclusion in The Best American Stories, 1984

== Theme ==
The themes in the works from Midnight Mass reflect the sedentary life that Bowles, then in his sixties, adopted as a resident of Tangiers and his preoccupation with his domestic staff and real estate holdings. Allen Hibbard writes:

If there is a central theme to this collection of stories, it might be the preoccupation with houses, the structures we inhabit...Richard E. Patternson identifies this as one of Bowles central concern: 'That which lies outside is presented as potentially hostile and threatening, yet the barriers, the shelters, erected to keep the danger out are insufficient..' The titles of two of the stories, "The Red Room" and "The Little House" point to this emphasis...

Hibbard adds that "the stories begin with a presentation of a house, which becomes a fragile haven for human life or a contested site for opposing values...two worldviews compete with each other under one roof..."

The stories in the volume, frequently told in the first-person point-of-view, convey "post-colonial anxieties" and challenge "the authenticity of divine revelation."

== Sources ==
- Hibbard, Allen. 1993. Paul Bowles: A Study of the Short Fiction. Twayne Publishers. New York. ISBN 0-8057-8318-0
- Hamdaoui, Zoubida. 2013. Themes and Story-Telling Strategies in Paul Bowles's North African Fiction. Tesis Doctoral. University of Granada, Spain. ISBN 978-84-9028-680-7 https://digibug.ugr.es/bitstream/handle/10481/29918/21922500.pdf?sequence=1 Retrieved 19 August 2022.
- Prose, Francine. 2002. The Coldest Eye: acting badly among the Arabs. Harper's Magazine. March, 2002. https://harpers.org/archive/2002/03/the-coldest-eye/ Retrieved 10 July 2022
