= Two Serious Ladies =

Book by Jane Bowles

- First edition
- Author: Jane Bowles
- Language: English
- Publisher: Alfred A. Knopf
- Publication date: 1943
- Publication place: United States
- Media type: Print (hardback & paperback) and audiobook
- Pages: 256 pages
- ISBN: 978-0-9560038-5-0

Two Serious Ladies is a 1943 modernist novel by the American writer Jane Bowles. It follows two upper-class women, Christina Goering and Frieda Copperfield, as they descend into debauchery.

Bowles' style is often described as singular.

In February 2012, an online magazine of the same title was created to honor Bowles' legacy and to promote writing by women.

In issue 543 of Interview magazine, filmmaker John Waters said he loves Jane Bowles and that "Two Serious Ladies" is the best novel ever written.
