= Let It Come Down (novel) =

Novel by Paul Bowles

- First edition (US)
- Author: Paul Bowles
- Language: English
- Publisher: Random House (US); John Lehmann (UK)
- Publication date: 1952
- Publication place: United States
- Media type: Print (Hardback & Paperback)
- Pages: 318

Let It Come Down is Paul Bowles's second novel, first published in 1952.

== Plot introduction ==
A dark, even bleak, novel, Let It Come Down follows American Nelson Dyar as he arrives in the International Zone of Tangier, Morocco to begin a new job and a new life. Dyar's exploration of the brothels, drugs and unsavoury characters of Tangier leads him gradually, logically, to a sinister conclusion.

=== Explanation of the novel's title ===
Bowles took the book's title from Macbeth III.3, just before Banquo is murdered:

Banquo: It will be rain to-night.
1st. Murd.: Let it come down.
(They set upon Banquo.)

The author has described the line as an ‘admirable four-word sentence, succinct and brutal’.

== Major themes ==
Like much of Bowles's writing, Let It Come Down seems to be concerned with the danger and chaos which can result in being immersed into an unfamiliar society. By the time the book was published, Tangier had become a fully Moroccan city, but before that, and in the setting of the novel, it was an International Zone which is seen as a melting-pot for many diverse and unconventional elements. Dyar, who has little personality of his own, tries to indulge his instincts by exploring the seedier side of the city; but, because he does not fully understand the limits or standards of the society he is in, he is unable to stop himself from going too far. Thus, Dyar allows situations to, in fact, react off of himself in his attempt to live by utopian free choice. However, he must eventually start taking responsibility for his own actions when consequences are set naturally upon him. Behind the useful façade of a civilised society, Bowles's book suggests, there is only the stark futility of cause, and inescapable effect.

== Selected printings ==
- 1952, London, John Lehmann, hardback (1st edition)
- 1952, New York, Random House, hardback (1st US)
- 1953, US, Signet, paperback (1st US paperback)
- 1980, Santa Barbara, California, Black Sparrow Press, paperback
- 1984, UK, Peter Owen, hardback
- 2000, UK, Penguin, paperback
