= A Gift for Kinza =

- Short story by Paul Bowles
- Country: United States
- Language: English

Publication
- Published in: Esquire
- Publication date: March 1951

"A Gift for Kinza" is a short story by Paul Bowles written in 1950 and published in the March 1951 issue of Esquire magazine. The story was published under the title "The Successor" in later collections such as The Hours After Noon (1959, Heinemann) and The Time of Friendship (1967, Holt, Rinehart and Winston). The work was completed in Kandy, Sri Lanka. "The Successor" is one of the three fables that appear in Bowles's short fiction collection The Time of Friendship (1967). The other two are "The Hyena" (1962) and "The Garden" (1964).

== Plot ==
Ali resides with his older brother, the proprietor of a café in Morocco. The younger brother is disaffected and resents his obligation to assist his elder sibling in the operation of the establishment as required by primogeniture. Ali also objects to his brother's indulgence in alcohol, a violation of Islamic strictures, as well as his courting of a local girl, Kinza, who the brother hopes to seduce.

A Belgian tourist seeking shelter from a rainstorm at the café shares beers with the elder proprietor. The visitor possesses a prescription of powerful sleeping pills. He gladly provides the elder brother with enough of the sedative to immobilize a person. Ali overhears the transaction. The older brother returns to the café the next day after visiting Kinza. Ali notes his agitation. The following day police arrive and interrogate the brother. He admits that he did not understand the deadly risks associated with the soporific he had furtively administered to the young women. He is arrested for murder of Kinza. Ali dispassionately recognizes that he will soon come into possession of the café.

== Theme ==
Literary critic John Ditsky writes:

Ali suffers by reason of being a second son, and therefore not his father's heir; this is "crushing injustice". "His brother was like the weather: one watched it and was a victim to its whims. It was written, but that did not mean it could not change. All that happens in this story, on the surface of things, is that Ali observes his brother accepting sleeping pills from a Belgian visitor in order to have his way with a young woman who, given too many pills, subsequently dies. The story ends with Ali in charge of the cafe, while his brother is being taken away by comically disbelieving police. The story is brought off, as suggested earlier, as well as one of Faulkner's about Negroes or Snopeses displaying their Darwinian capabilities: one wants to intervene; one also has to laugh.

== Sources ==
- Bowles, Paul. 2001. Paul Bowles; Collected Stories, 1939-1976. Black Sparrow Press. Santa Rosa. 2001.ISBN 0876853963
- Ditsky, John. 1986. The Time of Friendship: The Short Stories of Paul Bowles. Twentieth Century Literature, 34, no. 3-4 (1986) pp. 373–377.
- Hibbard, Allen. 1993. Paul Bowles: A Study of the Short Fiction. Twayne Publishers. New York. ISBN 0-8057-8318-0
