= The Sheltering Sky =

1949 novel by Paul Bowles

- First edition (later printing)
- Author: Paul Bowles
- Language: English
- Publisher: John Lehmann
- Publication date: 1949
- Publication place: United States
- Media type: Print (hardback & paperback)
- Pages: 304 pp

The Sheltering Sky is a 1949 novel of alienation and existential despair by American writer and composer Paul Bowles.

== Plot ==
The story centers on Port Moresby and his wife Kit, a married couple originally from New York who travel to the North African desert accompanied by their friend Tunner. The journey, initially an attempt by Port and Kit to resolve their marital difficulties, is quickly fraught by the travelers' ignorance of the dangers that surround them.

== Reception ==
Time magazine included the novel in its TIME 100 Best English-language Novels from 1923 to 2005. The Modern Library also included it on their 100 best of the century, ranked at number 97.

== Dramatic adaptations ==
The novel was adapted by Bernardo Bertolucci into a 1990 film with the same title starring Debra Winger and John Malkovich, and with a screenplay by Mark Peploe. The movie was filmed in Morocco, Algeria, and Niger.

== Cultural impact ==
=== Music ===
- The 1981 album Discipline by King Crimson includes an eight-minute instrumental composition titled "The Sheltering Sky". "Sheltering sky" is also referenced in the lyrics of the song "Walking on Air" from their 1995 album THRAK.
- The 1983 album Synchronicity by the Police includes a song called "Tea in the Sahara", the lyrics of which contain the phrase "beneath the sheltering sky" and are based on the tragic story of the three dancers who wish to have tea in the desert, but end up dead from the heat, with their cups filled only with sand. The story is told to the character Port in Chapter 5.
- The 1992 album Beyond the Sky by Omar Faruk Tekbilek was inspired by the film version of The Sheltering Sky.
- The 1992 album Woman to Woman by Fem 2 Fem has a reference to this book in the song "Obsession".
- The song "Lost" by Neurosis on the album Enemy of the Sun opens with a sample from the film. Also their album The Eye of Every Storm has a tracks entitled "Shelter" and " A Season in the Sky".
- The God Machine's first album Scenes from the Second Storey opens with a similar sample.
- The song "İki Yabancı" by Teoman on the album On Yedi makes a lyrical reference to the Turkish title of the movie.
- The 2001 album Hypothetical by Threshold has a song titled "Sheltering Sky."
- The song "fullmoon" from Ryuichi Sakamoto's 2017 album async contains excerpts of the novel presented in several languages. Sakamoto had composed most of the soundtrack for the 1990 film based on the novel.
- In 2025, the Arch Stanton Quartet, a jazz group, announced a series of performances featuring readings from "The Sheltering Sky," coupled with reinterpretations of Paul Bowles' musical compositions.

=== Memorial ===
In a 1993 interview just prior to his accidental on-set death while filming The Crow, actor Brandon Lee paraphrased a passage from The Sheltering Sky. Lee had chosen this quote to be included in his upcoming wedding invitations; it is now inscribed on his tombstone:

Because we don't know when we will die, we get to think of life as an inexhaustible well. And yet everything happens only a certain number of times, and a very small number really. How many more times will you remember a certain afternoon of your childhood, an afternoon that is so deeply a part of your being that you can't even conceive of your life without it? Perhaps four, or five times more? Perhaps not even that. How many more times will you watch the full moon rise? Perhaps twenty. And yet it all seems limitless...
