= Jane Bowles =

American writer and playwright (1917–1973)

- Born: Jane Sydney Auer; February 22, 1917; New York City
- Died: May 4, 1973 (aged 56); Málaga, Spain
- Occupations: Writer, playwright
- Spouse: Paul Bowles

Jane Bowles (/boʊls/; born Jane Sydney Auer; February 22, 1917 – May 4, 1973) was an American writer and playwright.

== Early life ==
Jane Bowles was born into a Jewish family in New York City on February 22, 1917, to Sydney Auer (father) and Claire Stajer (mother). She spent her childhood in Woodmere, New York, on Long Island. She had a bad knee from birth, which was later broken when she fell off a horse as a teenager. After knee surgery, she developed tuberculous arthritis, and her mother took her to Switzerland for treatment, where she attended boarding school. She also attended Julia Richmond High School in New York and the Stoneleigh School for Girls in Greenfield, Massachusetts.

At this point in her life, she developed a passion for literature as well as several insecurities. She developed phobias related to dogs, sharks, mountains, jungles, elevators, and being burned alive. During the mid-1930s she returned to New York, where she gravitated to the intellectual bohemia of Greenwich Village.

She married the composer and writer Paul Bowles in 1938. The location of the honeymoon inspired the setting for her novel Two Serious Ladies.

== Personal life ==
Bowles had a rich love life. In 1937, she and Paul Bowles were introduced to each other by Erika Mann, and the following year, they were married and went on a honeymoon in Central America. She visited lesbian bars while they traveled together in Paris. They had a sexual marriage for about a year and a half, after which they were platonic companions. They were both bisexual, and mainly preferred to have sex outside of their marriage.

After this, the couple went to Mexico, where Jane later met Helvetia Perkins (1895–1965), who became her lover.

== Career ==
In 1943, her novel Two Serious Ladies was published. The Bowleses lived in New York until 1947, when Paul moved to Tangier, Morocco; Jane followed him in 1948. While in Morocco, she had an intense, complicated relationship with a Moroccan woman named Cherifa. She also had a close relationship with the torch singer Libby Holman. Holman was attracted to both Jane and Paul, but Paul did not reciprocate.

Jane Bowles wrote the play In the Summer House, performed on Broadway in 1953 to mixed reviews. Tennessee Williams, Truman Capote, and John Ashbery all highly praised her work.

== In the Summer House ==
In the Summer House was her only full-length play. It was first performed in 1951 in the Hedgerow Theater in Moylan, Pennsylvania. The play opened on Broadway at the Playhouse Theatre on December 29, 1953, with music by Paul Bowles, where it ran for two months to mixed reviews and low attendance. Around 1963, the play was revived. The play was revived again in 1993 at the Vivian Beaumont Theater with incidental music by Philip Glass. This revival received nominations for the 1994 Drama Desk Awards for outstanding director of a play, set design, and supporting actress (JoAnne Akalaitis, George Tsypin, and Frances Conroy, respectively).

The play focuses on a comparison of an overbearing mother and gentle daughter and a gentle mother and an overbearing daughter. It begins with a monologue by Gertude Eastman Cuevas, an isolated widow from Southern California who marries a rich Mexican (with a singing and dancing comrade), who is oppressive towards her daughter. The other widow is Ms. Constable and her challenging daughter. The daughters are both unstable.

Cuevas has a suitor which makes the mother feel like she needs to be more overbearing. The first act closes on Cuevas and her new husband reading newspapers silently.

The second act occurs in a restaurant named The Lobster Bowl and uses intensive food imagery. Bowles's complex relationship with her mother could have been an inspiration for the plot.

== Death ==
Bowles, who was an alcoholic, suffered a stroke in 1957 at age 40. This affected her sight and mental capacity, but she pushed through her health problems and continued to write. Her health continued to decline despite various treatments in England and the United States. She was eventually admitted to a clinic in Málaga, Spain, where she died in 1973, at age 56.

== Legacy ==
In Paul Bowles' semi-autobiographical novel The Sheltering Sky, the characters Port and Kit Moresby were based on him and his wife. Debra Winger played Kit in the film adaptation of the novel. Although Bowles' literary output was not substantial in terms of volume, she was highly respected, with Truman Capote calling her "one of the really original pure stylists" and Tennessee Williams calling her "the most important writer of prose fiction in modern American letters."
