= Steve Buscemi filmography =

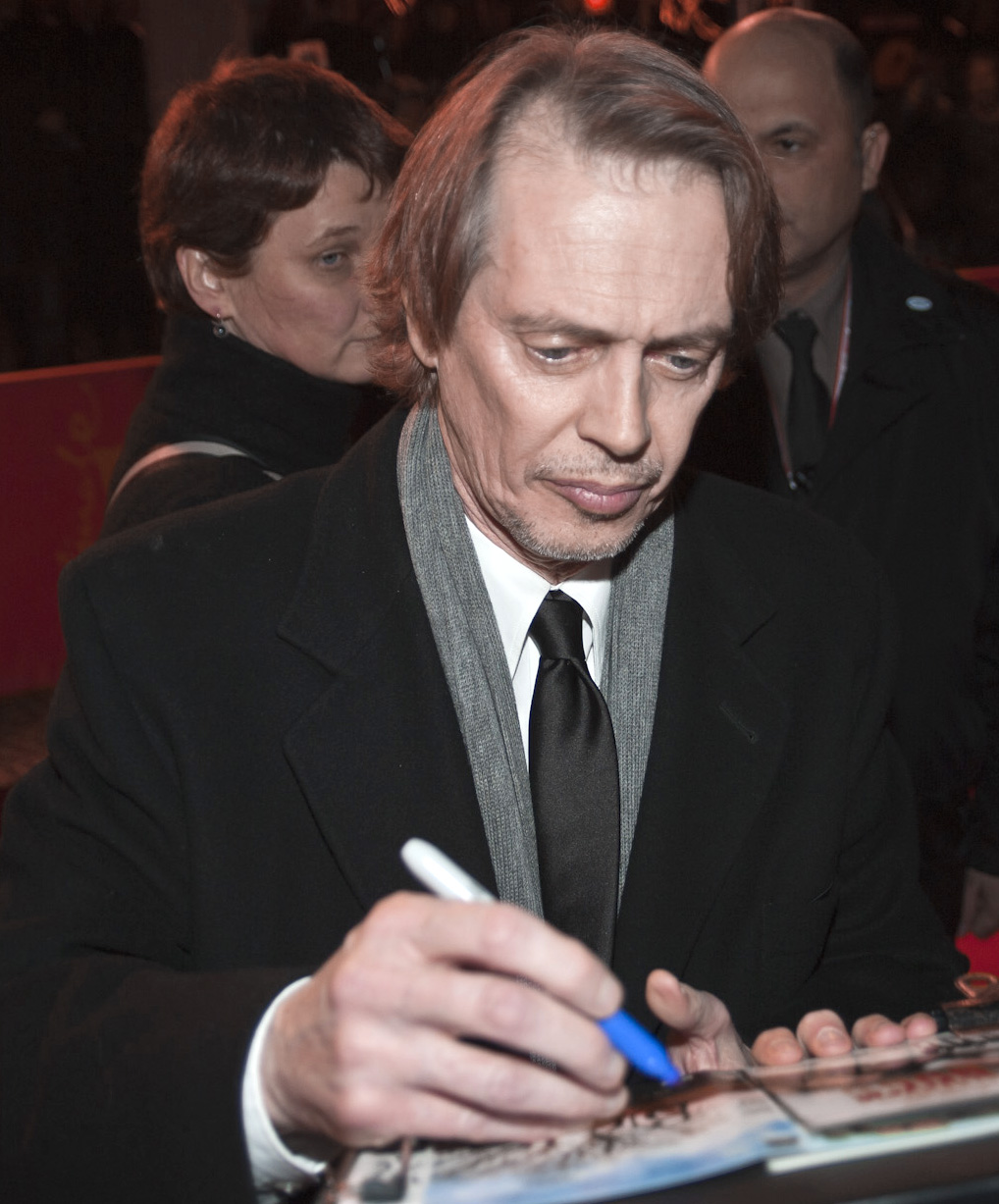
Buscemi at the Berlin Film Festival in 2009

Steve Buscemi is an American actor, director and producer who first gained notice for his role as a man living with AIDS in the film Parting Glances (1986). His breakout role in film was in his role as Mr Pink in Quentin Tarantino's Reservoir Dogs (1993). Since then, Buscemi has appeared in dozens of feature films, including Desperado (1995), Fargo (1996), Con Air (1997), Armageddon (1998), Monsters, Inc. (2001), Spy Kids 2: The Island of Lost Dreams (2002), Spy Kids 3-D: Game Over (2003), Home on the Range (2004), Charlotte's Web (2006), Igor (2008), G-Force (2009), Grown Ups (2010), Hotel Transylvania (2012), Monsters University (2013), The Ridiculous 6 (2015), The Death of Stalin (2017), Transformers One (2024), and Animal Farm (2026).

In television, Buscemi has hosted two episodes of Saturday Night Live, and frequently starred as Tony Blundetto in The Sopranos, Lenny Wosniak in 30 Rock, as the lead role in Boardwalk Empire, and as the host of the web television series Park Bench with Steve Buscemi.

== Film ==
Key
†	Denotes films that have not yet been released

Year	Title	Role	Notes
1985	The Way It Is	Willy / Raphael	
1985	Tommy's	Tommy	Short film
1986	Sleepwalk	Worker	
1986	Parting Glances	Nick	
1986	No Picnic	Dead Pimp	
1986	Film House Fever	Tony	
1987	Arena Brains	Agent	Short film
1987	Kiss Daddy Goodnight	Johnny	
1987	Heart	Nicky	
1987	Call Me	"Switchblade"	
1988	Heart of Midnight	Eddy	
1988	Vibes	Fred	
1989	Twins	The Waiter	Short film
1989	Slaves of New York	Wilfredo	
1989	Mystery Train	Charlie, The Barber	
1989	New York Stories	Gregory Stark	Segment: "Life Lessons"
1989	Bloodhounds of Broadway	Willie "Whining Willie"	
1990	Tales from the Darkside: The Movie	Edward Bellingham	Segment: "Lot 249"
1990	King of New York	"Test Tube"	
1990	Miller's Crossing	"Mink" Larouie	
1990	Force of Circumstance	Farmhand	
1991	Zandalee	OPP Man	
1991	Barton Fink	Chet	
1991	Life Is Nice	Convenience Store Clerk	
1991	Billy Bathgate	Irving Nitzberg	
1992	In the Soup	Aldolfo Rollo	
1992	Reservoir Dogs	"Mr. Pink"	
1992	CrissCross	Louis, Drug Dealer	
1992	What Happens to Pete	The Stranger	Short film
1993	Twenty Bucks	Frank	
1993	Trusting Beatrice	Danny	
1993	Rising Sun	Willy "The Weasel" Wilhelm	
1993	Ed and His Dead Mother	Ed Chilton	
1994	The Search for One-eye Jimmy	Ed Hoyt	
1994	The Hudsucker Proxy	Danny the Bartender	
1994	Somebody to Love	Mickey	
1994	Airheads	Rex	
1994	Pulp Fiction	Buddy Holly Waiter	
1994	Floundering	Ned	
1994	Who Do I Gotta Kill?	Fred, Conspiracy Nut	Uncredited
1995	Billy Madison	Danny McGrath	Uncredited
1995	Living in Oblivion	Nick Reve	
1995	Things to Do in Denver When You're Dead	"Mister Shhh"	
1995	Desperado	Buscemi	
1996	Fargo	Carl Showalter	
1996	Escape from L.A.	Eddie "Map to the Stars Eddie"	
1996	Black Kites	The Father	Short film
1996	Trees Lounge	Tommy Basilio	Also writer and director
1996	Kansas City	Johnny Flynn	
1997	Con Air	Garland "The Marietta Mangler" Greene	
1997	The Real Blonde	Nick Reve	
1998	The Big Lebowski	Theodore Donald "Donny" Kerabatsos	
1998	Divine Trash	Himself	Documentary
1998	The Impostors	"Happy" Franks	
1998	The Wedding Singer	Dave Veltri	Uncredited
1998	Armageddon	"Rockhound"	
1998	Louis & Frank	Drexel	
1999	Big Daddy	Homeless Guy	
2000	28 Days	Cornell Shaw	
2000	Animal Factory	A.R. Hosspack	Also director and producer
2001	Ghost World	Seymour	
2001	Final Fantasy: The Spirits Within	Neil Fleming	Voice
2001	The Grey Zone	"Hesch" Abramowics	
2001	Double Whammy	Detective Jerry Cubbins	
2001	Domestic Disturbance	Ray Coleman	
2001	Monsters, Inc.	Randall Boggs	Voice
2002	Mr. Deeds	"Crazy Eyes"	
2002	13 Moons	Bananas The Clown	
2002	Love in the Time of Money	Martin Kunkle	
2002	Spy Kids 2: The Island of Lost Dreams	Romero	
2003	Spy Kids 3-D: Game Over	Romero	Cameo
2003	Big Fish	Norther Winslow	
2003	Coffee and Cigarettes	Danny the bartender	
2004	Home on the Range	Wesley	Voice
2005	Who's the Top	Cymon	Short film
2005	The Island	James "Mac" McCord	
2005	Lonesome Jim	—N/a	Director
2005	Romance & Cigarettes	Angelo	
2006	Art School Confidential	Bob "Broadway Bob" D'Annunzio	Uncredited
2006	Paris, je t'aime	The Tourist	Segment: "Tuileries"
2006	Monster House	Horace Nebbercracker	Voice and motion-capture
2006	Charlotte's Web	Templeton	Voice
2006	Delirious	Les Galantine	
2007	I Think I Love My Wife	George Sianidis	
2007	Interview	Pierre Peders	Also writer and director
2007	I Now Pronounce You Chuck & Larry	Clint Fitzer	
2007	I'm Dirty!	Backhoe Loader	Voice; Short film
2008	Igor	Scamper	Voice
2009	Rage	Frank	
2009	John Rabe	Dr. Robert O. Wilson	
2009	G-Force	Bucky	Voice
2009	The Messenger	Dale Martin	
2009	Handsome Harry	Thomas Kelley	
2009	Saint John of Las Vegas	John Alighieri	Also executive producer
2009	Youth in Revolt	George Twisp	
2010	Grown Ups	Wiley	
2010	Pete Smalls Is Dead	Bernie Lake	
2010	The Chosen One	Neal	
2011	Fight for Your Right Revisited	Walter	Short film
2011	Rampart	Bill Blago	
2012	On the Road	Tall Thin Salesman	
2012	Hotel Transylvania	Wayne	Voice
2013	The Incredible Burt Wonderstone	Anthony Metz / Anton Marvelton	
2013	Monsters University	Randall Boggs	Voice
2013	Grown Ups 2	Wiley	
2013	Khumba	Skalk	Voice
2014	Time Out of Mind	Art	
2014	My Depression	"Suicidal Thoughts"	Voice; Short film
2014	The Cobbler	Jimmy	
2015	Hotel Transylvania 2	Wayne	Voice
2015	The Ridiculous 6	"Doc" Griffin	
2016	Mildred & The Dying Parlor	Rick	Short film
2016	Norman	Rabbi Blumenthal	
2017	The Boss Baby	Francis Francis	Voice
2017	Transformers: The Last Knight	Daytrader	Voice
2017	Lean on Pete	Del Montgomery	
2017	The Death of Stalin	Nikita Khrushchev	
2018	Nancy	Leo Lynch	
2018	The Week Of	Charles	
2018	Hotel Transylvania 3: Summer Vacation	Wayne	Voice
2019	The Dead Don't Die	Frank Miller	
2020	The King of Staten Island	Papa	
2020	Hubie Halloween	Walter Lambert AKA Nick Hudson	
2022	Hotel Transylvania: Transformania	Wayne	Voice
2022	The Listener	—N/a	Director
2022	The Year Between	Don Miller	
2023	Vacation Friends 2	Reese	
2023	Day of the Fight	Colm	
2024	Psycho Therapy: The Shallow Tale of a Writer Who Decided to Write About a Serial Killer	Kollmick	
2024	The Brown Note	Radio Announcer	Voice; short film
2024	Carole & Grey	Shapeshifter	
2024	Transformers One	Starscream	Voice
2025	Animal Farm	Mr. Whymper	Voice
2025	Happy Gilmore 2	Pat	Cameo
2025	Playdate	Himself	Cameo
2026	The Only Living Pickpocket in New York	Ben	
2026	Mary Oliver: Saved by the Beauty of the World	Himself	Documentary
2026	Roommates	John	Cameo
2026	Don't Say Good Luck	Dale	
2026	Wild Horse Nine	MJ	
2026	Klara and the Sun	Capaldi	
2028	Dynamic Duo †	Red Hood Two	Voice; Post-production
TBA	The Marshmallow Experiment †	King Dong	Post-production
TBA	Ages of the Moon †		Post-production; also producer
TBA	Grown Ups 3 †	Wiley	Filming

== Television ==
=== Actor ===
Year	Title	Role	Notes
1986	Not Necessarily the News	Neil	1 episode
1986	Miami Vice	Rickles	Episode: "El Viejo"
1987	The Equalizer	Archie	Episode: "Re-Entry"
1988	Crossbow	Captain of The Guard	Episode: "The Lost Crusader"
1989	Lonesome Dove	Luke	4 episodes
1990	Monsters	John Dennis	Episode: "Bed and Boar"
1990	Against the Law	Timmy Lowell	Episode: "Where the Truth Lies"
1991	L.A. Law	David Lee	Episode: "Spleen It to Me, Lucy"
1992	Mad About You	Howie Balinger	Episode: "Token Friend"
1993	Tales from the Crypt	Ike	Episode: "Forever Ambergris"
1993	The Last Outlaw	Philo	Television film
1994–1996	The Adventures of Pete & Pete	Phil Hickle	3 episodes
1995	Homicide: Life on the Street	Gordon Pratt	Episode: "Endgame"
1998	The Drew Carey Show	Ed Chilton	Episode: "Mr. Louder's Birthday Party"
1998, 2011	Saturday Night Live	Himself (host)	2 episodes
2002	The Laramie Project	"Doc" O'Conner	Television film
2003, 2007	The Simpsons	Himself / Dwight	Voice; 2 episodes
2004	Tanner on Tanner	Himself	Episode: "Dinner at Elaine's"
2004, 2006	The Sopranos	Tony Blundetto / The Man	13 episodes
2006	Dust to Dust: The Health Effects of 9/11	The Narrator	Voice; documentary
2007–2013	30 Rock	Lenny Wosniak	6 episodes
2008	ER	Art Masterson	Episode: "The Chicago Way"
2010–2014	Boardwalk Empire	Nucky Thompson	56 episodes
2014–2017	Portlandia	Various roles	5 episodes
2014	A Good Job: Stories of the FDNY	Himself	Documentary
2014–2015	Park Bench with Steve Buscemi	Himself (host)	27 episodes
2014, 2015	Last Week Tonight with John Oliver	Himself / The Chief	2 episodes
2015	The Jim Gaffigan Show	Himself	Episode: "Wonderful"
2016	Horace and Pete	Pete Jr.	9 episodes
2016	Bob's Burgers	Tom Innocenti	Voice; episode: "Sexy Dance Healing"
2016	Inside Amy Schumer	Himself	Episode: "Brave"
2016, 2019	Unbreakable Kimmy Schmidt	Himself	2 episodes
2017	Not the White House Correspondents' Dinner	Dr. Steve Buscemi	Television special
2017	Neo Yokio	The Rememberancer	Voice; 2 episodes
2017	Philip K. Dick's Electric Dreams	Ed Morris	Episode: "Crazy Diamond"
2017	Broad City	Mugger	Episode: "Bedbugs"
2017, 2023	SpongeBob SquarePants	Dorsal Dan	Voice; 2 episodes
2018	Elena of Avalor	Saloso	Voice; episode: "The Tides of Change"
2019–2023	Miracle Workers	God (season 1); Eddie Shitshoveler (season 2); Benny the Teen (season 3); Morris 'The Junkman' Rubinstein (season 4)	40 episodes
2020	Scooby-Doo and Guess Who?	Himself, Paolo Buscemi	Voice; episode: "Fear of the Fire Beast!"
2021	Rick and Morty	Eddie	Voice; episode: "A Rickconvenient Mort"
2023	Bupkis	Father Mac	Episode: "Do as I Say, Not as I do"
2023	Digman!	The Antiquarian	Voice; episode: "The Grail"
2023	StoryBots: Answer Time	Mr. Castaway	Episode: "Glass"
2023–2024	Krapopolis	Hephaestus	Voice; 2 episodes
2024	Curb Your Enthusiasm	Mike DiCarlo	Episode: "The Colostomy Bag"
2024	Monsters at Work	Randall Boggs	Voice; 2 episodes
2024	Fantasmas	Q	Episode: "Cookies and Spaghetti"
2024	Kamp Koral: SpongeBob's Under Years	Dorsal Dan	Voice; episode: "End of Summer Daze"
2025	Poker Face	Good Buddy	Voice; 4 episodes
2025	The Studio	Himself	Episode: "The Promotion"
2025	Big Mouth	Mr. Pink	Voice; episode: "Homecumming"
2025	Wednesday	Barry Dort	7 episodes
2025	Star Wars: Visions	Fox-Ear	Voice (English dub); episode: "Yuko's Treasure"
2025	Universal Basic Guys	Mr. Jackson	Voice; episode: "Good Marks"
2026	Elsbeth	Simon Craigie	Episode: "Murder Six Across"
2026	The Terrors of Jordan Mendoza	Himself	Episode: "Had This Crazy Dream"
TBA	Far Cry †	TBA	Upcoming series
TBA	The X-Files †	TBA	Upcoming series

=== Director ===
Year	Title	Notes
1998	Homicide: Life on the Street	Episode: "Finnegan's Wake"
1999, 2001	Oz	2 episodes
2001–2006	The Sopranos	4 episodes
2002	Baseball Wives	Pilot
2009–2011	Nurse Jackie	6 episodes
2009, 2012	30 Rock	2 episodes
2014–2015	Park Bench with Steve Buscemi	27 episodes
2015–2017	Portlandia	4 episodes
2016	Love	Episode: "Magic"
2016	Unbreakable Kimmy Schmidt	Episode: "Kimmy Goes to a Hotel!"
2019–2023	Miracle Workers	4 episodes

=== Producer ===
Year	Title	Notes
2018	Dreaming of a Vetter World	
2021	Dust: The Lingering Legacy of 9/11	

== Stage ==
Year	Title	Role	Venue
1984	Red House	Shevaugn	La MaMa Experimental Theatre Club, Off-Off-Broadway
1985	Miss Universal Happiness	Guerrilla / Easter Bunny	Wooster Group Performing Garage, New York City
1986	Deep Sleep	Performer	La MaMa Experimental Theatre Club, Off-Off-Broadway
1987	L.S.D. (…Just The High Points…)	Jackie Leary / Billy Orlovsky / A Religious Young Man	Montreal Festivals
1987	L.S.D. (…Just The High Points…)	Jackie Leary / Betsy Perry / John Webster	Smith College, Northampton, Massachusetts
1988	In Your Mind	Various roles	La MaMa Experimental Theatre Club, Off-Off-Broadway
1999–2000	North Atlantic	Colonel Lloyd "Ned" Lud (A.A.)	Wooster Group Performing Garage, New York City
2002	The Resistible Rise of Arturo Ui	Giuseppe "The Florist" Givola	Schimmel Theatre, Off-Broadway

== Video games ==
Year	Title	Role	Notes
2001	Monsters, Inc. Wreck Room Arcade	Randall Boggs	
2001	Monsters, Inc. Scream Team Training	Randall Boggs	
2001	Monsters, Inc.	Randall Boggs	
2001	Monsters, Inc. Scream Team	Randall Boggs	
2002	Monsters, Inc. Scream Arena	Randall Boggs	

== Music videos ==
Year	Title	Role	Artist	Notes
2011	"Make Some Noise"	Waiter	Beastie Boys	
2023	"Baticano"	Mentor	Bad Bunny	
