= List of awards and nominations received by Steve Buscemi =

Steve Buscemi awards and nominations
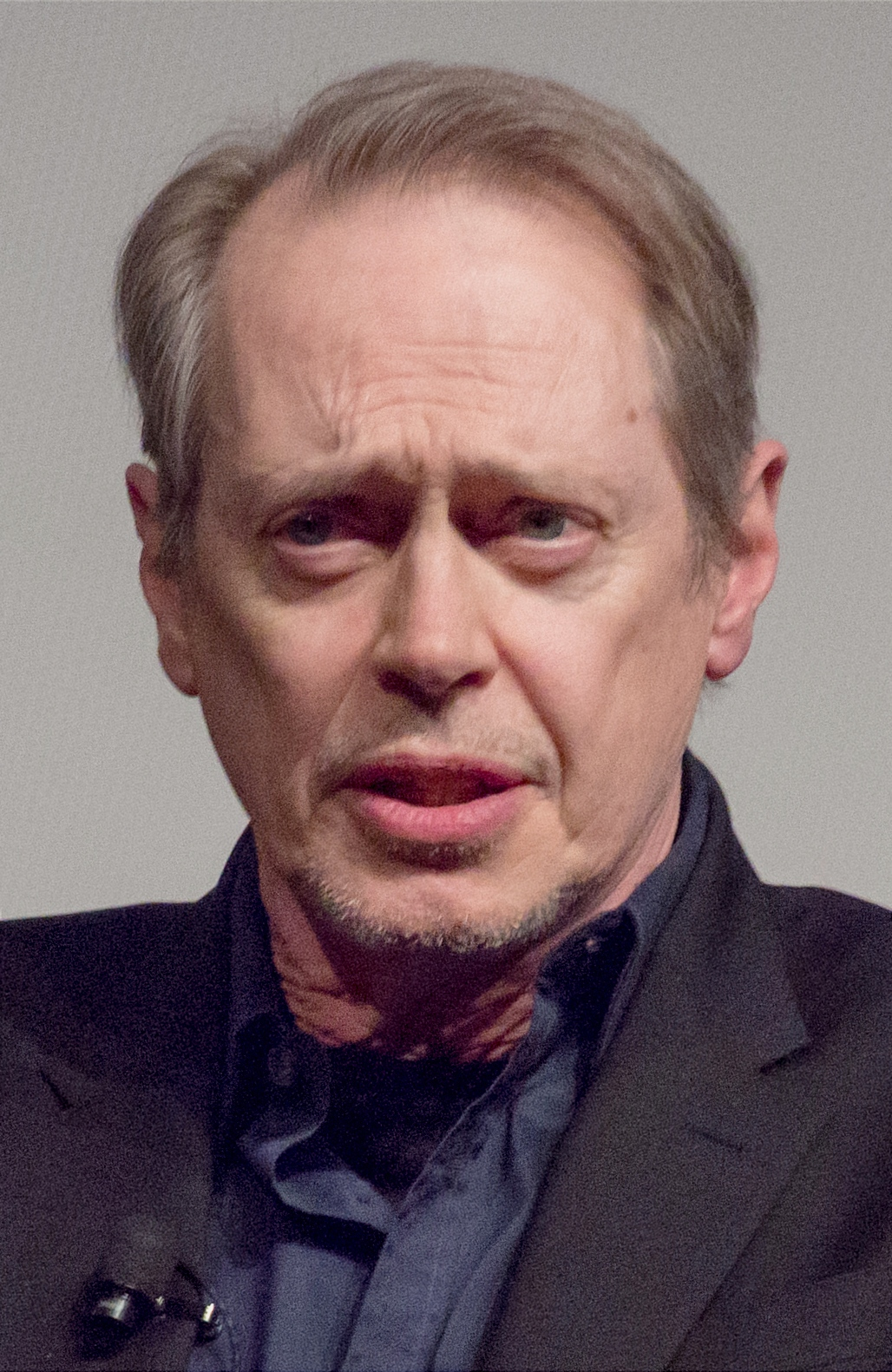
- Buscemi in 2018
Awards and nominations
Award	Wins	Nominations
Emmy Awards	2	10
Golden Globe Awards	1	4
Screen Actors Guild Awards	4	11

Totals (Note: Certain award groups do not simply award one winner. They acknowledge several different recipients, have runners-up, and have third place. Since this is a specific recognition and is different from losing an award, runner-up mentions are considered wins in this award tally. For simplification and to avoid errors, each award in this list has been presumed to have had a prior nomination.)
- Wins: 4
- Nominations: 21

Steve Buscemi is an American actor known for his performances in film, and television. He has received two Emmy Awards, a Golden Globe Award, two Independent Spirit Awards, and four Screen Actors Guild Awards.

Buscemi is known for his collaborations with the Coen Brothers acting in five of their films starting with Miller's Crossing (1990), followed by Barton Fink (1991), The Hudsucker Proxy (1994), Fargo (1996), and The Big Lebowski (1998). Buscemi is also known for his role as Mr. Pink in Quentin Tarantino's Reservoir Dogs (1992) a role for which he won the Independent Spirit Award for Best Supporting Male. He played a lonely middle-aged man in the black comedy Ghost World (2001) for which he earned the Independent Spirit Award for Best Supporting Male and a nomination for the Golden Globe Award for Best Supporting Actor – Motion Picture. He also acted in the Michael Bay films Con Air (1997) and Armageddon (1998), Tim Burton's fantasy drama Big Fish (2003), and Armando Iannucci's political black comedy The Death of Stalin (2017).

On television, he played Tony Blundetto in the HBO crime drama series The Sopranos for which he was nominated for the Primetime Emmy Award for Outstanding Supporting Actor in a Drama Series. As a director, he was nominated for the Primetime Emmy Award for Outstanding Directing for a Drama Series for the acclaimed episode "Pine Barrens". He took a comedic recurring guest role as private investigator Lenny Wosniak in the NBC sitcom 30 Rock (2007–2013) for which he was nominated for the Primetime Emmy Award for Outstanding Guest Actor in a Comedy Series. He was nominated in the same category for his role as a landlord in the IFC comedy series Portlandia (2014–2017). Buscemi won won the Primetime Emmy Award for Outstanding Short Form Variety Series for the comedic web series Park Bench with Steve Buscemi (2016).

Buscemi has received numerous awards and nominations for his role as Enoch 'Nucky' Thompson in the critically acclaimed HBO drama series Boardwalk Empire, created by Martin Scorsese. He won the Golden Globe Award for Best Actor – Television Series Drama as well as four Screen Actors Guild Awards for two consecutive Outstanding Actor in a Drama Series and two consecutive Outstanding Ensemble in a Comedy Series (2011, 2012). He was also nominated for two Primetime Emmy Awards for Outstanding Lead Actor in a Drama Series.

== Major associations ==
=== Cannes Film Festival ===
Year	Category	Nominated work	Result	Ref.
1996	Caméra d'Or	Trees Lounge	Nominated	

=== Emmy Awards ===
Year	Category	Nominated work	Result	Ref.
Primetime Emmy Awards
2001	Outstanding Directing for a Drama Series	The Sopranos (episode: "Pine Barrens")	Nominated	
2004	Outstanding Supporting Actor in a Drama Series	The Sopranos (episode: "Rat Pack" + "Marco Polo")	Nominated	
2008	Outstanding Guest Actor in a Comedy Series	30 Rock (episode: "The Collection)	Nominated	
2011	Outstanding Lead Actor in a Drama Series	Boardwalk Empire (episode: "A Return to Normalcy")	Nominated	
2012	Outstanding Lead Actor in a Drama Series	Boardwalk Empire (episode: "Two Boats and a Lifeguard")	Nominated	
2014	Outstanding Short-Format Nonfiction Program	Park Bench with Steve Buscemi	Nominated	
2014	Outstanding Guest Actor in a Comedy Series	Portlandia (episode: Celery")	Nominated	
2016	Outstanding Short Form Variety Series	Park Bench with Steve Buscemi	Won	
Daytime Emmy Awards
2019	Outstanding Performer in an Animated Program	Elena of Avalor (episode: "The Tides of Change")	Nominated	
News & Documentary Emmy Awards
2015	Outstanding Business and Economic Reporting	Independent Lens	Won	

=== Golden Globe Awards ===
Year	Category	Nominated work	Result	Ref.
2001	Best Supporting Actor in a Motion Picture	Ghost World	Nominated	
2010	Best Actor in a Television Series – Drama	Boardwalk Empire (season 1)	Won	
2011	Best Actor in a Television Series – Drama	Boardwalk Empire (season 2)	Nominated	
2012	Best Actor in a Television Series – Drama	Boardwalk Empire (season 3)	Nominated	

=== Independent Spirit Award ===
Year	Category	Nominated work	Result	Ref.
1989	Best Supporting Male	Mystery Train	Nominated	
1992	Best Supporting Male	Reservoir Dogs	Won	
1996	Best First Feature	Trees Lounge	Nominated	
1996	Best First Screenplay	Trees Lounge	Nominated	
2001	Best Supporting Male	Ghost World	Won	

=== Screen Actors Guild Awards ===
Year	Category	Nominated work	Result	Ref.
2004	Outstanding Ensemble in a Drama Series	The Sopranos	Nominated	
2010	Outstanding Male Actor in a Drama Series	Boardwalk Empire (season 1)	Won	
2010	Outstanding Ensemble in a Drama Series	Boardwalk Empire (season 1)	Won	
2011	Outstanding Male Actor in a Drama Series	Boardwalk Empire (season 2)	Won	
2011	Outstanding Ensemble in a Drama Series	Boardwalk Empire (season 2)	Won	
2012	Outstanding Male Actor in a Drama Series	Boardwalk Empire (season 3)	Nominated	
2012	Outstanding Ensemble in a Drama Series	Boardwalk Empire (season 3)	Nominated	
2013	Outstanding Male Actor in a Drama Series	Boardwalk Empire (season 4)	Nominated	
2013	Outstanding Ensemble in a Drama Series	Boardwalk Empire (season 4)	Nominated	
2014	Outstanding Male Actor in a Drama Series	Boardwalk Empire (season 5)	Nominated	
2014	Outstanding Ensemble in a Drama Series	Boardwalk Empire (season 5)	Nominated	

== Miscellaneous awards ==
Association	Year	Category	Nominated work	Result
20/20 Awards	2016	Best Actor	Living in Oblivion	Nominated
American Film Institute Awards	2002	Feature Actor of the Year – Male — Movies	Ghost World	Nominated
American Comedy Awards	1997	Funniest Actor in a Motion Picture	Fargo	Nominated
Awards Circuit Community Awards	1996	Best Actor in a Supporting Role	Fargo	Won
Awards Circuit Community Awards	1996	Best Cast Ensemble	Fargo	Won
Behind the Voice Actors Awards	2013	Best Vocal Ensemble in a Feature Film	Hotel Transylvania	Nominated
Behind the Voice Actors Awards	2014	Best Vocal Ensemble in a Feature Film	Monster's University	Nominated
Behind the Voice Actors Awards	2015	Best Male Vocal Performance in a TV Special/Direct-to-Video Title or Short	Khumba	Nominated
Boston Society of Film Critics Awards	2001	Best Supporting Actor	Ghost World	Nominated
British Independent Film Awards	2017	Best Supporting Actor	The Death of Stalin	Nominated
Chicago Film Critics Association Awards	1997	Best Supporting Actor	Fargo	Nominated
Chicago Film Critics Association Awards	2002	Best Supporting Actor	Ghost World	Won
Chlotrudis Awards	1997	Best Director	Trees Lounge	Nominated
Chlotrudis Awards	2002	Best Supporting Actor	Ghost World	Won
Crime Thriller Awards	2011	Best Leading Actor	Boardwalk Empire	Nominated
Crime Thriller Awards	2012	Best Leading Actor	Boardwalk Empire	Nominated
Critics Choice Television Awards	2011	Best Actor in a Drama Series	Boardwalk Empire	Nominated
Dallas-Fort Worth Film Critics Association Awards	2002	Best Supporting Actor	Ghost World	Nominated
Directors Guild of America	1999	Outstanding Directorial Achievement in Dramatic Series' – Night	Homicide: Life on the Street	Nominated
Directors Guild of America	2002	Outstanding Directorial Achievement in Dramatic Series' – Night	The Sopranos	Nominated
DVD Exclusive Awards	2003	Best Supporting Actor	Double Whammy	Nominated
Fantasporto Awards	2008	Best Screenplay	Interview	Won
Film Club's The Lost Weekend	2018	Best Supporting Actor	The Death of Stalin	Won
Florida Film Festival	1998	Special Achievement Award	—N/a	Won
German Film Awards	2009	Best Supporting Actor	John Rabe	Nominated
Ghent International Film Festival	2005	Grand Prix	Lonesome Jim	Nominated
Gijon International Film Festival	2007	Best Feature	Interview	Nominated
Gold Derby Awards	2004	Drama Supporting Actor	The Sopranos	Nominated
Gold Derby Awards	2011	Drama Lead Actor	Boardwalk Empire	Nominated
Golden Schmoes Awards	2001	Best Supporting Actor of the Year	Ghost World	Nominated
Gotham Awards	2003	Tribute Award	—N/a	Won
Kansas City Film Critics Circle Awards	2001	Best Supporting Actor	Ghost World	Won
Las Vegas Film Critics Society Awards	2002	Best Supporting Actor	Ghost World	Won
Method Fest	2010	Feature Film	Handsome Harry	Nominated
Monte-Carlo TV Festival	2012	Outstanding Actor in a Drama Series	Boardwalk Empire	Nominated
MTV Movie + TV Awards	1997	Best On-Screen Duo (shared with Peter Stormare)	Fargo	Nominated
National Society of Film Critics Awards	2002	Best Supporting Actor	Ghost World	Won
New York Film Critics Circle Awards	2001	Best Supporting Actor	Ghost World	Won
New York Film Critics Online	2001	Best Supporting Actor	Ghost World	Won
Online Film & Television Association Awards	2002	Best Supporting Actor	Ghost World	Nominated
Online Film & Television Association Awards	2004	Best Supporting Actor in a Drama Series	The Sopranos	Nominated
Online Film & Television Association Awards	2008	Best Guest Actor in a Drama Series	ER	Nominated
Online Film & Television Association Awards	2011	Best Actor in a Drama Series	Boardwalk Empire	Won
Online Film & Television Association Awards	2011	Best Ensemble in a Drama Series	Boardwalk Empire	Won
Online Film & Television Association Awards	2012	Best Actor in a Drama Series	Boardwalk Empire	Nominated
Online Film & Television Association Awards	2012	Best Ensemble in a Drama Series	Boardwalk Empire	Nominated
Online Film & Television Association Awards	2013	Best Actor in a Drama Series	Boardwalk Empire	Nominated
Online Film & Television Association Awards	2013	Best Ensemble in a Drama Series	Boardwalk Empire	Nominated
Online Film & Television Association Awards	2014	Best Guest Actor in a Comedy Series	Portlandia	Nominated
Online Film Critics Society Awards	2002	Best Supporting Actor	Ghost World	Won
Philadelphia Film Festival	2005	American Independents Award	—N/a	Won
Phoenix Film Critics Society Awards	2002	Best Supporting Actor	Ghost World	Nominated
San Diego Film Critics Society Awards	2001	Special Award	Ghost World; Monsters, Inc. Double Whammy; Domestic Disturbance; Final Fantasy: The Spirits Within	Won
San Jordi Awards	1997	Best Foreign Actor	Fargo Living in Oblivion	Won
Satellite Awards	1997	Best Supporting Actor in a Motion Picture — Drama	Fargo	Nominated
Satellite Awards	2002	Best Supporting Actor in a Motion Picture — Comedy or Musical	Ghost World	Nominated
Satellite Awards	2011	Best Actor in a Series — Drama	Boardwalk Empire	Nominated
Saturn Awards	1998	Best Supporting Actor	Con Air	Nominated
Southeastern Film Critics Association Awards	2001	Best Supporting Actor	Ghost World	Nominated
Stockholm Film Festival	2000	Bronze Horse Award	Animal Factory	Nominated
Sundance Film Festival	2005	Dramatic	Lonesome Jim	Nominated
Television Critics Association Awards	2011	Individual Achievement in Drama	Boardwalk Empire	Nominated
Toronto Film Critics Association Awards	2001	Best Supporting Performance – Male	Ghost World	Nominated
Vancouver Film Critics Circle Awards	2002	Best Actor	Ghost World	Won
Village Voice Film Poll Awards	2001	Best Supporting Performance	Ghost World	Won
