= Michael Buscemi =

American actor (born 1960)

- Born: Michael Joseph Buscemi; February 13, 1960 (age 66); Brooklyn, New York City, United States
- Occupation: Actor
- Years active: 1993–present
- Relatives: Steve Buscemi (brother)

Michael Joseph Buscemi (born February 13, 1960) is an American actor. He is the younger brother of actor Steve Buscemi.

== Early life and career ==
Buscemi was born in Brooklyn, New York, the third of four brothers. He attended Valley Stream Central High School on Long Island.

He began acting in the Lower East Side during the 1980s, around the same time as his brother, and established himself as an actor in the East Village during the 1990s.

Buscemi made his screen debut in the 1993 short film Happy Hour. He has since appeared in several independent and low-budget productions, including Trees Lounge (1996), Animal Factory (2000) and 13 Moons (2002), all directed by or co-starring his brother Steve. In Trees Lounge and Interview, he played the brother of Steve Buscemi’s character.

Buscemi also appeared in the television series The Sopranos in 1999 and had a recurring role in Nurse Jackie, directed by his brother, as a psychotic man who believes he is God. He appeared alongside Adam Sandler in the comedies I Now Pronounce You Chuck & Larry (2007) and Blended (2014).

In 2012, Buscemi wrote, directed and starred in the short film B61, which premiered at the Tribeca Film Festival.

== Filmography ==
=== Film ===
- The Projectionist (2026)
- You Are So Not Invited to My Bat Mitzvah (2023)
- Blackout (2023)
- Duo (short) (2020)
- Hey! Aren’t You Garrett Crest? (2019)
- Smothered by Mothers (2019)
- Abnormal Attraction (2018)
- BlacKkKlansman (2018)
- MGMT: Me and Michael (short) (2018)
- The Pros of Cons (TV film) (2017)
- The Holdouts (TV film) (2017)
- The Girl Who Invented Kissing (2017)
- The Karma Club (2016)
- Time Out of Mind (2014)
- Blended (2014)
- B61 (short) (2012)
- Being Flynn (2012)
- Sarina’s Song (short) (2011)
- Mauselehome Sweet Home (short) (2010)
- Two Birds (short) (2010)
- Yes, Virginia (short, TV film; voice) (2009)
- Dos C (short) (2009)
- Veneer (short) (2008)
- Japan (2008)
- Anamorph (2007)
- I Now Pronounce You Chuck & Larry (2007)
- Interview (2007)
- The Collection (2005)
- Searching for Bobby D (2005)
- Lonesome Jim (2005)
- Personal Sergeant (2004)
- Replay (voice) (2003)
- Five Years (2002)
- 13 Moons (2002)
- Reveille (short) (2001)
- Acts of Worship (2001)
- Margarita Happy Hour (2001)
- Happy Accidents (2000)
- Animal Factory (2000)
- Cross-Eyed (1999)
- Habit (1997)
- Trees Lounge (1996)
- Black Kites (short) (1996)
- Café Babel (short) (1995)
- Dawg (short) (1995)
- River of Grass (1994)
- Happy Hour (short) (1993)
- The Gun Is Loaded (short) (1989)

=== Television ===
- Beyond Belief: Fact or Fiction (one episode, 2023)
- Gotham (one episode, 2017)
- The Night Of (two episodes, 2016)
- Park Bench with Steve Buscemi (18 episodes, 2014–2015)
- Nurse Jackie (eight episodes, 2009–2015)
- Orange Is the New Black (one episode, 2015)
- Mr. Robot (one episode, 2015)
- Blue Bloods (one episode, 2014)
- Sex and the City (one episode, 2002)
- The Job (one episode, 2002)
- The Sopranos ("Meadowlands", one episode, 1999)
- New York Undercover (one episode, 1998)
