= The Projectionist (2026 film) =

2026 crime film

- Official release poster
- Directed by: Alexandre Rockwell
- Written by: Alexandre Rockwell
- Produced by: Jack Auen; Alexandre Rockwell
- Starring: Vondie Curtis-Hall; Kasi Lemmons; Karyn Parsons; Kevin Corrigan; Michael Buscemi; Steven Randazzo; Lana Rockwell; Ramona Silva; Selah Rust; Jaden Walton; George Leonard; David Proval
- Cinematography: Sam Motamedi
- Edited by: Alexandre Rockwell
- Music by: Richard Edson
- Production companies: Black Horse Productions; O-Tay Pictures
- Distributed by: Utopia
- Release date: February 19, 2026 (Slamdance)
- Running time: 94 minutes
- Country: United States
- Language: English

The Projectionist is a 2026 American crime thriller film written and directed by Alexandre Rockwell. It stars Vondie Curtis-Hall, Kasi Lemmons, Karyn Parsons, Kevin Corrigan, Michael Buscemi, Steven Randazzo, Lana Rockwell, Ramona Silva, Selah Rust, Jaden Walton, George Leonard and David Proval.

The film premiered as the opening film of the 32nd Slamdance Film Festival on February 19, 2026, before its theatrical release in the United States by Utopia.

== Cast ==
- Vondie Curtis-Hall as Sully
- Kasi Lemmons as Ramona
- Karyn Parsons as Rosa
- Kevin Corrigan as Donald
- Michael Buscemi as Dizzy
- Steven Randazzo
- Lana Rockwell
- Ramona Silva
- Selah Rust
- Jaden Walton
- George Leonard
- David Proval as Aaron

== Production ==
Principal photography had wrapped in September 2024 on a crime thriller film written and directed by Alexandre Rockwell, and executive produced by Quentin Tarantino. It stars Vondie Curtis-Hall, Karyn Parsons, Kasi Lemmons, David Proval, Kevin Corrigan, and Michael Buscemi. Rockwell, Tarantino and Proval previously worked together on the comedy anthology film Four Rooms (1995). Tarantino also made a cameo appearance in Rockwell's Somebody to Love (1994).

== Release ==
The Projectionist is set to be theatrically released in the United States by Utopia. The film premiered as the opening film of the 32nd Slamdance Film Festival on February 19, 2026. It also played at the 4th New/Next Film Festival on October 4, 2026, the 27th Woodstock Film Festival on October 16 and the 28th Indie Memphis Festival on November 6, 2026.

=== Critical response ===
Scott Clark of Gazettely gave the film a 7.5/10 rating, saying "The experimental aspect ratio shifts might feel arbitrary to some, however, the strength of the ensemble, particularly Vondie Curtis-Hall, provides a necessary emotional anchor".
