= Dreaming of a Vetter World =

- Theatrical release poster
- Directed by: Bonnie Hawthorne
- Written by: Bonnie Hawthorne
- Produced by: Jo Andres; Steve Buscemi; Robert Houston
- Starring: David J. Vetter; Fred Kirschenmann
- Edited by: Bonnie Hawthorne
- Music by: Kyp Malone
- Release date: October 12, 2018
- Running time: 77 minutes
- Country: United States
- Language: English

Dreaming of a Vetter World is a 2018 American documentary film directed by filmmaker Bonnie Hawthorne. The film explores the life of pioneering organic farmer David Vetter, his farm's role in popularizing the organic farming movement in the United States, and the role that soil management has in Vetter's farming practices.
