= Dust to Dust: The Health Effects of 9/11 =

- Directed by: Heidi Dehncke-Fisher
- Produced by: Bruce Kennedy
- Narrated by: Steve Buscemi
- Release date: September 11, 2006
- Running time: 65 minutes

Dust to Dust: The Health Effects of 9/11 is a documentary film that was broadcast on the Sundance Channel. It was directed by Heidi Dehncke-Fisher and produced by Bruce Kennedy on September 11, 2006.

It addressed the health effects on people in the vicinity of the collapsed World Trade Center following the September 11 attacks in New York City. It also questions whether politics influenced federal Environmental Protection Agency statements asserting air safety in lower Manhattan.

It includes interviews with ill victims of the Twin Towers' dust and health officials in New York City. It also includes quotes by government officials, such as a video of then New York City mayor Rudy Giuliani saying, "The air quality is safe and acceptable."

Actor Steve Buscemi, a former New York City firefighter, is the narrator of the film. The day following the September 11th attacks, Buscemi volunteered and worked on relief efforts for one week, all the while shunning publicity for it.

The New York Times reviewer Anita Gates found the documentary "powerful and persuasive", and said that the "villain" of Dust to Dust was EPA director Christine Todd Whitman.

== See also ==
- Dust: The Lingering Legacy of 9/11
- Health effects of September 11, 2001 attacks
- Survivors of the September 11, 2001 attacks
