= Little Feet (film) =

2013 film

- Directed by: Alexandre Rockwell
- Written by: Alexandre Rockwell
- Starring: Rene Cuante-Bautista
- Cinematography: David Walter Lech
- Release date: September 7, 2013 (TIFF)
- Running time: 60 minutes
- Country: United States
- Language: English

Little Feet is a 2013 American drama film written and directed by Alexandre Rockwell. It was screened in the Contemporary World Cinema section at the 2013 Toronto International Film Festival.

== Cast ==
- Rene Cuante-Bautista
- Lana Rockwell
- Nico Rockwell
