= Bruce Kennedy (television producer) =

American television producer, screenwriter, and director

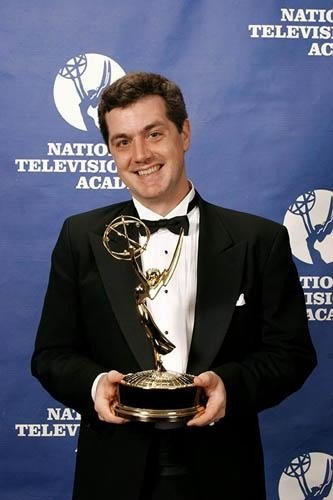
- Kennedy in 2005
- Born: October 23, 1970 (age 55); Greenwich, Connecticut, U.S.
- Education: Greenwich High School; Princeton University; Intercollegiate Center for Classical Studies; New York University Tisch School of the Arts
- Occupations: Screenwriter; Television producer; Television director
- Years active: 1995–present

Bruce Kennedy (born October 23, 1970) is an American television producer, screenwriter, and director. He has won a News & Documentary Emmy Award and been nominated for a Primetime Emmy Award.

Kennedy specializes in transforming complicated concepts into entertaining narratives and collaborating with top talent to produce focused and riveting stories. His television credits range across several formats and networks, from historical and nature documentaries to true crime series to live events.

== Early life and career ==
Born in 1970 in Greenwich, Connecticut, Bruce graduated Princeton University with a degree in Classics, and has an MA in Performance Studies from New York University's Tisch School of the Arts. He began his television career in Singapore in 1995, where he created and produced numerous regional television shows including "Young Wonders", "Artitude" and "HobbyTV" before returning to New York City in 2000.

== Later career ==
Kennedy was the supervising producer of the theatrically released film 7 Days in September (winner of CINE Golden Eagle and Telly Award) and worked with director Peter Gilbert on the civil rights film With All Deliberate Speed, which débuted at the Tribeca Film Festival. His documentary for Sundance Channel, Dust to Dust: the Health Effects of 9/11 - narrated by Steve Buscemi - traces the deteriorating medical conditions of the first responders to the September 11 attacks. As the supervising producer and writer of Discovery's Decisions That Shook the World - narrated by Morgan Freeman - he earned a national Emmy Award in 2004.

In 2001, he helped found and executive produce the RIPfest collaborative film project, a short film-making event where teams of TV/commercial professionals and artists are given 16 days to create high-quality short films from scratch based on the cast and locations assigned to them. With RIPfest, he has executive produced nearly 90 short films.

Kennedy went on to produce live television events as well, starting with the finales of The Apprentice (U.S. TV series), The Celebrity Apprentice and The Contender (TV series) and eventually running a seven-hour live broadcast of the paranormal series Ghost Adventures for Travel Channel. He went on to write and produce two seasons of "Yellowstone Live" on the National Geographic Channel as well as "American Spring Live" for PBS Nature (TV program).

His most recent series, Ancient Apocalypse - about a controversial theory of a lost civilization espoused by best-selling author Graham Hancock, was called "the most dangerous show on Netflix" by The Guardian.

His full production credits can be found on imdb.com.

== Awards ==
- Emmy Award, 2005, Outstanding Individual Achievement in a Craft: Research (mini), Decisions That Shook the World
