= Carpool Karaoke: The Series =

- Genre: Reality
- Created by: Ben Winston; James Corden
- Based on: Carpool Karaoke by Ben Winston & James Corden
- Directed by: Benjamin Green; Blake Webster
- Country of origin: United States
- Original language: English
- No. of seasons: 5
- No. of episodes: 75

Production
- Executive producers: Ben Winston; James Corden; Eric Pankowski
- Producers: Benjamin Green; Diana Miller
- Running time: 12–23 minutes
- Production companies: Fulwell 73; CBS Studios

Original release
- Network: Apple Music
- Release: August 9, 2017 – May 10, 2021
- Network: Apple TV app
- Release: October 12, 2018 – May 10, 2021
- Network: Apple TV+
- Release: May 27, 2022 – June 23, 2023

Carpool Karaoke: The Series is an American television series that debuted on Apple Music on August 9, 2017. Based on the recurring segment, Carpool Karaoke, from The Late Late Show with James Corden, the series pairs various celebrities with each other as they drive around together and sing along to popular music. On February 15, 2018, it was announced that the series had been renewed for a second season that debuted on October 12, 2018, on Apple TV. On August 17, 2021, it was announced that the series had been renewed for a fifth and final season and would be moving to Apple TV+. The fifth and final season debuted on May 27, 2022. A Christmas special premiered on Apple TV+ and Apple Music on December 15, 2024.

== Premise ==
In each episode of Carpool Karaoke: The Series, "celebrities will ride along and sing along...as they visit places meaningful to the celebrity, sing tunes from their personal playlists and surprise fans who don't expect to see big stars belting out tunes one lane over."

== Episodes ==
Season	Episodes	Originally released		
Season	Episodes	First released	Last released	Network
1	21	August 9, 2017	June 22, 2018	Apple Music
2	19	October 12, 2018	March 29, 2019	Apple Music; Apple TV app
3	9	January 24, 2020	March 20, 2020	Apple Music; Apple TV app
4	4	May 10, 2021		Apple Music; Apple TV app
5	22	May 27, 2022	June 23, 2023	Apple TV+

=== Season 1 (2017–18) ===
No. overall	No. in season	Featured celebrities	Original release date
1	1	"James Corden & Will Smith"	August 9, 2017
Songs used: "Gettin' Jiggy wit It", "Boom! Shake the Room", "The Fresh Prince of Bel-Air", "Summertime", & "I Believe I Can Fly"
2	2	"Alicia Keys & John Legend with special guests James Corden & Taraji P. Henson"	August 15, 2017
Songs used: "Hollywood Swinging", "Fallin'", "No One", "All of Me", "Love Me Now", "Blended Family (What You Do for Love)", "I'll Be There for You/You're All I Need to Get By", & "Ordinary People"
3	3	"Billy Eichner & Metallica"	August 15, 2017
Songs used: "Enter Sandman", "Part of Your World", "Now That We're Dead", "Master of Puppets", & "Diamonds"
4	4	"Sophie Turner & Maisie Williams"	August 22, 2017
Songs used: "Sorry", "Wrecking Ball", "Self Control", & "My Prerogative"
5	5	"Seth MacFarlane & Ariana Grande"	August 22, 2017
Songs used: "Suddenly Seymour", "The Song That Goes Like This", "What is this Feeling?", "Ten Minutes Ago", & "Nothing in Common"
6	6	"The Cyrus Family (Miley, Billy Ray, Tish, Braison, Brandi, Trace, & Noah)"	August 29, 2017
Songs used: "Malibu", "Party in the U.S.A.", "24K Magic", "Stay Together", "Shake It", & "Achy Breaky Heart"
7	7	"Queen Latifah & Jada Pinkett-Smith with special guests Regina Hall & Tiffany Haddish"	August 29, 2017
Songs used: "Ladies First", "Nasty", "My Lovin' (You're Never Gonna Get It)", "Let's Go Crazy", & "Girls Just Want to Have Fun"
8	8	"John Cena & Shaquille O'Neal"	September 5, 2017
Songs used: "Gin and Juice", "(I Know I Got) Skillz", "The Time Is Now", "Mama Said Knock You Out", "Africa" (a cappella), "True Colors" (a cappella), "Red Red Wine" (a cappella), "Conga" (a cappella), "Like a Virgin" (a cappella), "Papa Don't Preach" (a cappella), & "Maneater"
9	9	"Jeff Gordon & Michael Strahan"	September 5, 2017
Songs used: "Lovely Day", "Physical", "E.I.", & "Closer"
10	10	"Shakira & Trevor Noah"	September 19, 2017
Songs used: "Whenever, Wherever", "Zombie", "Triumph", "Chantaje", "Waka Waka (This Time for Africa)", "Hips Don't Lie", & "Try Everything"
11	11	"Tracee Ellis Ross & Big Sean"	September 19, 2017
Songs used: "Bounce Back", "Moves", "Endless Love", "Dance (Ass)" (spoken word), "Baby Got Back" (spoken word), "O.P.P." (spoken word), & "I Don’t **** with You" (bleeped on both clean and explicit versions)
12	12	"Gwyneth Paltrow, Jessica Alba, & will.i.am with special guest James Corden"	September 26, 2017
Songs used: "Let's Get It Started", "It Takes Two", "I Gotta Feeling", "Country Strong", "Forget You", "Hot in Herre"
13	13	"Sheryl Crow & Dierks Bentley"	September 26, 2017
Songs used: "All I Wanna Do", "What Was I Thinkin'", "Picture", "Drunk on a Plane", "If It Makes You Happy", "Good Hearted Woman", "Folsom Prison Blues", & "On the Road Again"
14	14	"Tyrese Gibson & Ludacris"	October 3, 2017
Songs used: "Southern Hospitality", "Poison", "Sweet Lady", "The Humpty Dance", "Shame", & "All I Do Is Win"
15	15	"Blake Shelton & Chelsea Handler"	October 3, 2017
Songs used: "Hillbilly Bone", "Take On Me", "Total Eclipse of the Heart", "Austin", "Tiny Bubbles" (a cappella), & "Livin' on a Prayer"
16	16	"Neil Patrick Harris & Tyler Perry"	October 10, 2017
Songs used: "Uptown Funk", "You're Beautiful", "Love Shack", & "(I've Had) The Time of My Life"
17	17	"Joe Jonas & Camila Cabello"	October 10, 2017
Songs used: "Cake by the Ocean", "Crying in the Club", "Kissing Strangers", & "You're the One That I Want"
18	18	"Linkin Park & Ken Jeong"	October 12, 2017
Songs used: "Hey Ya!", "Numb", "In the End", "Talking to Myself", "Under the Bridge", "Sweet Home Alabama", & "I Don't Want to Miss a Thing" Note: The episode is dedicated to the memory of Linkin Park lead singer Chester Bennington, who died by suicide following the production of the episode.
19	19	"LeBron James & James Corden, with special guest Ice Cube"	October 31, 2017
Songs used: "Numb / Encore", "Yeah!", "Bad and Boujee", "It Was a Good Day", & "Maniac"
20	20	"Jeremy Renner, Jon Hamm, & Ed Helms"	June 15, 2018
Songs used: "Get Ready for This", "Bohemian Rhapsody", "We Built This City", "Sister Christian", "I Want It That Way", & "You Give Love a Bad Name"
21	21	"Evan Rachel Wood & James Marsden"	June 22, 2018
Songs used: "When Doves Cry", "Summer Nights", "Shoop" (parodied as "Loop"), "After All", & "Ironic"

=== Season 2 (2018–19) ===
No. overall	No. in season	Featured celebrities	Original release date
22	1	"Jamie Foxx & Corinne Foxx"	October 12, 2018
Songs used: "Hot Blooded", "Blame It", "You Look So Good in Love", "My Girl", "Bodak Yellow", "The Devil Went Down to Georgia", & "No Weapon"
23	2	""Weird Al" Yankovic & the Lonely Island"	October 19, 2018
Songs used: "Fat", "Amish Paradise", "Angela (Theme from Taxi)", "867-5309/Jenny", "I'm on a Boat", & "Dick in a Box"
24	3	"Wiz Khalifa & Bebe Rexha"	October 26, 2018
Songs used: "Finesse", "Meant to Be", "See You Again", "This Is How We Do It", & "Black and Yellow"
25	4	"Megan Mullally & Nick Offerman, with special guest Stephanie Hunt"	November 3, 2018
Songs used: "London Bridge", "50 Ways to Leave Your Lover", "Tiny Dancer", "I Don't Love Her", & "My Cherie Amour"
26	5	"Triple H & Stephanie McMahon; Big E, Xavier Woods & Kofi Kingston; Becky Lynch, Naomi, Natalya Neidhart, Charlotte Flair & Nia Jax; Alexa Bliss & Braun Strowman"	November 10, 2018
Songs used: "Crazy Train", "Bust a Move", "Paranoid", "Enter Sandman", "U Can't Touch This", "You Got It (The Right Stuff)", "Wannabe", "MMMBop", & "Man! I Feel Like a Woman!"
27	6	"Tyra Banks & Lil Yachty"	November 17, 2018
Songs used: "It Takes Two", "Forever Young", "Yellow", "Be a Star", & "Broccoli"
28	7	"Quincy Jones & Rashida Jones"	November 30, 2018
Songs used: "Thriller", "Fly Me to the Moon", "It's My Party", "P.Y.T. (Pretty Young Thing)", "Man in the Mirror", & "Rock with You"
29	8	"Kendall Jenner & Hailey Bieber, with special guest Miley Cyrus"	December 7, 2018
Songs used: "I Write Sins Not Tragedies", "Lean on Me", "Party in the U.S.A.", "Nothing Breaks Like a Heart", & "Company"
30	9	"Jason Sudeikis & The Muppets"	December 14, 2018
Songs used: "Break My Stride", "I Guess That's Why They Call It the Blues", "Under Pressure", "Runaround Sue", "Rhythm of the Night", & "It's Tricky"
31	10	"Gisele Bündchen & Boyz II Men"	January 25, 2019
Songs used: "One Sweet Day", "I'll Make Love to You", "Best Day of My Life", "On Bended Knee", & "End of the Road"
32	11	"Star Trek: Discovery cast: Mary Wiseman, Doug Jones, Anthony Rapp, & Sonequa Martin-Green"	February 1, 2019
Songs used: "That's the Way (I Like It)", "I Will Survive", "Shape of You", "Space Oddity", & "Seasons of Love" (parody)
33	12	"Thomas Middleditch & Ben Schwartz, with special guest Dr. Drew"	February 8, 2019
Songs used: "You Make My Dreams", "Happy", "Isn't She Lovely", "A Whole New World", "Back in Time", & "Tha Crossroads"
34	13	"Shaun White, Tony Hawk, & Kelly Slater, with special guest Mark Mothersbaugh"	February 15, 2019
Songs used: "My Sharona", "I Wanna Be Sedated", "Alive", "Fell in Love with a Girl", & "Whip It"
35	14	"Snoop Dogg & Matthew McConaughey"	February 22, 2019
Songs used: "Rock and Roll All Nite", "Nuthin' but a 'G' Thang", "On the Road Again", "Gin and Juice", "Drop It Like It's Hot", & "Margaritaville"
36	15	"Kevin Durant & Travis Scott, with special guests Kylie Jenner, Jeff Van Gundy, Mark Jones, Kerith Burke, Paul Pierce, Michelle Beadle, Jalen Rose, & Chauncey Billups"	March 1, 2019
Songs used: "Super Freak", "Goosebumps", "Calling My Spirit", "Sicko Mode", "Too Darn Hot", & "Don't Worry, Be Happy"
37	16	"Samuel L. Jackson & Brie Larson"	March 8, 2019
Songs used: "My Prerogative", "7 Rings", "Love and Happiness", "Just a Girl", & "Raspberry Beret"
38	17	"Michael Sheen & Matthew Rhys"	March 15, 2019
Songs used: "Tainted Love", "West End Girls", "Delilah", "The Young New Mexican Puppeteer", "Africa", "America" (a cappella), & "C'mon Get Happy"
39	18	"Taron Egerton & Richard Madden"	March 22, 2019
Songs used: "Bennie and the Jets", "Young Americans", "Rocket Man", "Addicted to Love", "Faith"
40	19	"Ben Platt & Sara Bareilles"	March 29, 2019
Songs used: "Sir Duke", "Zak and Sara", "Brave", "Bad Habit", "Bad Idea", "Armor"

=== Season 3 (2020) ===
No. overall	No. in season	Featured celebrities	Original release date
41	1	"Darius Rucker & Anthony Anderson"	January 24, 2020
Songs used: "Only Wanna Be with You", "Wagon Wheel", "Fire and Desire", "La donna è mobile" (A cappella), "Congratulations", "Hold My Hand"
42	2	"Ken Jeong, Nicole Scherzinger, & Robin Thicke"	January 31, 2020
Songs used: "Blurred Lines", "Respect", "Kiss (Prince song)" (A cappella), "Oops!... I Did It Again" (A cappella), "Oh Sherrie" (A cappella), "Killing Me Softly" (A cappella), "What's Up?", "Africa" (A cappella), "True Colors (Cyndi Lauper song)" (A cappella), "Buttons", "Old Town Road" (A cappella), "Weak" (A cappella), "She'll Be Coming 'Round the Mountain" (A cappella)
43	3	"Kesha & Whitney Cummings"	February 7, 2020
Songs used: "TiK ToK", "Raising Hell", "Call Me Maybe", "We R Who We R", ”Strawberry Wine"
44	4	"Mae Whitman, Christina Hendricks, & Retta"	February 14, 2020
Songs used: "Girls Just Want to Have Fun", "Hold On", "Satisfied", "Torn", "Alone"
45	5	"Seal & Jay Leno"	February 21, 2020
Songs used: "Stay", "Working for the Man", "They Can't Take That Away from Me", "Kiss from a Rose"
46	6	"Zooey Deschanel, Emily Deschanel, Jonathan Scott, & Drew Scott"	February 28, 2020
Songs used: "Hooked on a Feeling", "All My Life", "Joy to the World" (A cappella), "Baby, It's Cold Outside" (A cappella), "...Baby One More Time", "When Will I Be Loved"
47	7	"Weezer & Fred Armisen"	March 6, 2020
Songs used: "Beverly Hills", "Buddy Holly", "Can't Knock the Hustle", "Undone – The Sweater Song", "No Scrubs", "Africa"
48	8	"Daniel Bryan, Roman Reigns, Becky Lynch, Seth Rollins, Ronda Rousey, The Bella Twins, The Miz, Shayna Baszler, Jessamyn Duke, Marina Shafir & Maryse Ouellet"	March 13, 2020
Songs used: "Tubthumping", "Old Town Road", "Shake It Off", "Wannabe", "You're the Best", "I'm Too Sexy", "We're Not Gonna Take It"
49	9	"Finn Wolfhard, Millie Bobby Brown, Gaten Matarazzo, Caleb McLaughlin, Noah Schnapp, & Sadie Sink"	March 20, 2020
Songs used: "High Hopes", "It's the Hard Knock Life", "Don't You (Forget About Me)", "Big Poppa", "Tiny Dancer", "Edge of Seventeen"

=== Season 4 (2021) ===
No. overall	No. in season	Featured celebrities	Original release date
50	1	"Maya Rudolph & HAIM"	May 10, 2021
Songs used: "All That She Wants", "Want You Back", "Like a Prayer", "The Steps", "Little Red Corvette", "Summer Girl", and "1999"
51	2	"Keegan-Michael Key & Rob Gronkowski"	May 10, 2021
Songs used: "Ice Ice Baby", "Y.M.C.A.", "Eye of the Tiger", "All Star", "We Are the Champions", and "Sweet Caroline"
52	3	"Patricia Arquette & David Arquette"	May 10, 2021
Songs used: "Magic Carpet Ride", "Blister in the Sun", "Home", and "Ain't Too Proud to Beg"
53	4	"Mark Cuban, Robert Herjavec, Daymond John, & Kevin O'Leary"	May 10, 2021
Songs used: "Takin' Care of Business", "Why Can't We Be Friends?", "Me!", and "Rapper's Delight"

=== Season 5 (2022–23) ===
No. overall	No. in season	Featured celebrities	Original release date
54	1	"Simu Liu & Jessica Henwick"	May 27, 2022
Songs used: "All the Small Things", "Everybody (Backstreet's Back)", "A Thousand Miles", "Sexy and I Know It", "All of Me", and "Closing Time"
55	2	"Murray Bartlett, Alexandra Daddario & Sydney Sweeney"	May 27, 2022
Songs used: "Somebody to Love", "Hey, Soul Sister", "Once in a Lifetime", "Goodbye Stranger", and "We Are Never Ever Getting Back Together"
56	3	"Anitta & Saweetie"	May 27, 2022
Songs used: "Best Friend", "Faking Love", "Let's Stay Together", "My Type", and "Shake It Off"
57	4	"Zooey Deschanel & Jonathan Scott"	May 27, 2022
58	5	"CM Punk, Bryan Danielson, Christian Cage & Dr. Britt Baker DMD; Powerhouse Hobbs, Ruby Soho & MJF"	May 27, 2022
59	6	"Charli D'Amelio, Dixie D'Amelio, Heidi D'Amelio & Marc D'Amelio"	May 27, 2022
60	7	"Sandra Oh & Duran Duran"	December 9, 2022
Songs used: "Rio"
61	8	"Joel Kinnaman, Shantel VanSanten, Edi Gathegi & Cynthy Wu; Krys Marshall, Jodi Balfour & Coral Peña"	December 9, 2022
62	9	"Nikki Glaser & Wilco, with special guest Mavis Staples"	December 9, 2022
63	10	"Hillary Clinton, Chelsea Clinton & Amber Ruffin, with special guest Vanessa Williams"	December 9, 2022
64	11	"Kevin Bacon & Michael Bacon"	December 9, 2022
65	12	"Method Man & Chris Redd"	December 9, 2022
66	13	"Ciara & Russell Wilson"	December 9, 2022
67	14	"Alan Cumming & Brian Cox"	March 31, 2023
68	15	"John Cho, Anna Konkle, Zoë Chao, Jack Whitehall & Sam Richardson"	June 23, 2023
69	16	"Yungblud & Avril Lavigne"	June 23, 2023
70	17	"Lea Michele & Darren Criss with special guest Hila Kremer"	June 23, 2023
71	18	"Cedric the Entertainer & Sheryl Lee Ralph"	June 23, 2023
72	19	"Alanis Morissette & Cara Delevingne"	June 23, 2023
73	20	"Renee Elise Goldsberry, Busy Philipps, Sara Bareilles, & Paula Pell"	June 23, 2023
74	21	"Rose McIver, Utkarsh Ambudkar, Rebecca Wisocky, Devan Chandler Long & Roman Zaragoza"	June 23, 2023
75	22	"Alison Brie & Danny Pudi with special guest Joel Mchale"	June 23, 2023

== Production ==
=== Development ===
On July 26, 2016, Apple Music and CBS Television Studios announced that they had reached a deal for an exclusive first-window licensing agreement under which Apple Music would be the global home of a television series adaptation of the popular recurring segment, Carpool Karaoke from the Late Late Show with James Corden. It was further reported that production companies CBS Television Studios and Fulwell 73 would produce the series. James Corden and Ben Winston are the creators and executive producers for the series. Before the deal was reached, CBS Studios International and Fulwell 73 had been shopping the series for an international home. It was also initially announced that the series would have a host that would appear in every episode. On January 9, 2017, it was reported that the series would not feature a single host and instead would have a different host every episode.

On February 15, 2018, it was announced that the series had been renewed for a second season. On May 26, 2018, it was reported that an episode of season two would feature cast members from Star Trek: Discovery including Sonequa Martin-Green, Mary Wiseman, Anthony Rapp, and Doug Jones. On October 9, 2018, it was announced that season two would premiere on October 12, 2018. Episodes were set to feature guest stars including Jason Sudeikis with The Muppets, The Lonely Island with "Weird Al" Yankovic, Snoop Dogg with Matthew McConaughey, Rashida Jones with her father Quincy Jones, Tyra Banks, and Jamie Foxx with his daughter Corinne Foxx. It was then announced that beginning with season two, the series was expected to move to the Apple TV app with new episodes being released on Fridays through December 2018 and then resuming again after the holidays. On August 17, 2021, it was announced that the series had been renewed for a fifth and final season and would be moving to Apple TV+.

=== Filming ===
In March 2018, an episode featuring James Marsden and Evan Rachel Wood, both of whom star on the HBO series Westworld, was filmed in Austin, Texas during the annual South by Southwest Film Festival.

== Release ==
=== Marketing ===
On February 13, 2017, Apple released the first teaser trailer for the series and a few days later, the first full-length trailer was released. On October 9, 2018, the official trailer for season two was released.

== International versions ==
Country	Title	Network	Host	Premiere
Israel	Carpool Karaoke	KAN 11	Shahar hason	May 15, 2017
Italy	Carpool Karaoke	Italia 1	Jake La Furia	April 27, 2017
United Arab Emirates	Carpool Karaoke Arabia	Dubai TV	Hisham Al Howaish	February 18, 2018
Saudi Arabia	Carpool Karaoke KSA	SBC	Hisham Al Howaish	January 26, 2020
France	Plan C	TF1	Camille Combal	June 14, 2019

=== Premiere ===
After initially being set to premiere in April 2017, it was announced on April 25, 2017, that the series would be delayed to sometime later in the year. On May 30, 2017, it was announced that the show's official premiere date would be August 8, 2017.

== Reception ==
=== Critical reception ===
The first season received a mixed to negative reception from critics upon its premiere. Sonya Saralya of Variety commented "For a segment that emphasized spontaneity and intimacy, Carpool Karaoke on Apple Music feels distancing--highlighting how dissimilar the guests are from the audience, instead of the other way around." Rebecca Nicholson of The Guardian was also negative in her review saying, "Apple has supersized [Corden's] formula but, in doing so, has managed to misunderstand entirely what it is that made it charming. Judging by the first episode and what's teased later in the series, this is less about getting a revealing interview out of someone who may otherwise seem distant, and more about bowing down to the power of celebrity."

=== Awards and nominations ===
Year	Award	Category	Nominee(s)	Result	Ref.
2018	Primetime Emmy Awards	Outstanding Short Form Variety Series	Carpool Karaoke: The Series	Won	
2019	Producers Guild of America Awards	Outstanding Short-Form Program	Carpool Karaoke: The Series	Nominated	
2019	Primetime Emmy Awards	Outstanding Short Form Variety Series	Carpool Karaoke: The Series	Won	
2020	Primetime Emmy Awards	Outstanding Short Form Variety Series	Carpool Karaoke: The Series	Won	
2021	Primetime Emmy Awards	Outstanding Short Form Comedy, Drama or Variety Series	Carpool Karaoke: The Series	Won	
2022	Primetime Emmy Awards	Outstanding Short Form Comedy, Drama or Variety Series	Carpool Karaoke: The Series	Won	
2023	Primetime Emmy Awards	Outstanding Short Form Comedy, Drama or Variety Series	Carpool Karaoke: The Series	Nominated	

== See also ==
- List of Apple TV+ original programming
