= Dust: The Lingering Legacy of 9/11 =

2021 documentary film

- Directed by: Bridget Gormley
- Produced by: Gerry Sievers
- Cinematography: Gerry Sievers
- Edited by: Gerry Sievers
- Music by: Raphael Fimm
- Production companies: Big Head; Olive Productions
- Release date: 2021
- Running time: 65 minutes
- Country: United States
- Language: English

Dust: The Lingering Legacy of 9/11 is a 2021 American documentary film about the toxic health effects of the dust created by the 9/11 attack on the World Trade Center. The film is directed by Bridget Gormley.

Steve Buscemi is one of the executive producers of the film.

== See also ==
- Dust to Dust: The Health Effects of 9/11
