= Pete Smalls Is Dead =

- Theatrical release poster
- Directed by: Alexandre Rockwell
- Written by: Brandon Cole; Alexandre Rockwell
- Produced by: Floyd Byars; Brandon Cole; Peter Dinklage; Paul Hudson; Alexandre Rockwell; Sean-Michael Smith
- Starring: Mark Boone Junior; Peter Dinklage; Seymour Cassel; Todd Barry; Steve Buscemi; Rosie Perez; Tim Roth
- Cinematography: Kai Orion
- Edited by: Jarrah Gurrie; Aldolpho Rollo; Josiah Signor
- Music by: Mader
- Production companies: Ms. Tangerine Productions; Pantry Films
- Distributed by: W2 Media
- Release dates: September 17, 2010 (OIFF); April 14, 2011 (United States)
- Running time: 95 minutes
- Country: United States
- Language: English

Pete Smalls Is Dead is a 2010 American comedy film directed by Alexandre Rockwell and written by Brandon Cole and Alexandre Rockwell. The film stars Mark Boone Junior, Peter Dinklage, Seymour Cassel, Todd Barry, Steve Buscemi, Rosie Perez and Tim Roth. The film was released on April 14, 2011.

== Cast ==
- Mark Boone Junior as Jack Gomes
- Peter Dinklage as K.C. Munk
- Seymour Cassel as Saco
- Todd Barry as Bob Withers
- Steve Buscemi as Bernie Lake
- Rosie Perez as Julia
- Tim Roth as Pete Smalls
- Ritchie Coster as Hal Lazar
- Lena Headey as Shannah
- Michael Hitchcock as Sly
- Carol Kane as Landlady
- Artin Kishani as Aram
- Michael Lerner as Leonard Proval
- David Proval as Nimmo
- Steven Randazzo as Larson
- Emily Rios as Xan
- Theresa Wayman as Saskia
- Cástulo Guerra as El Patron
- Tony Longo as Joey Sausa
- Tatyana Ali as Cocktail Waitress
- Peter O'Leary as Fat Monk
- Coati Mundi as Pool Band Leader
