= Alexandre Rockwell =

American film director

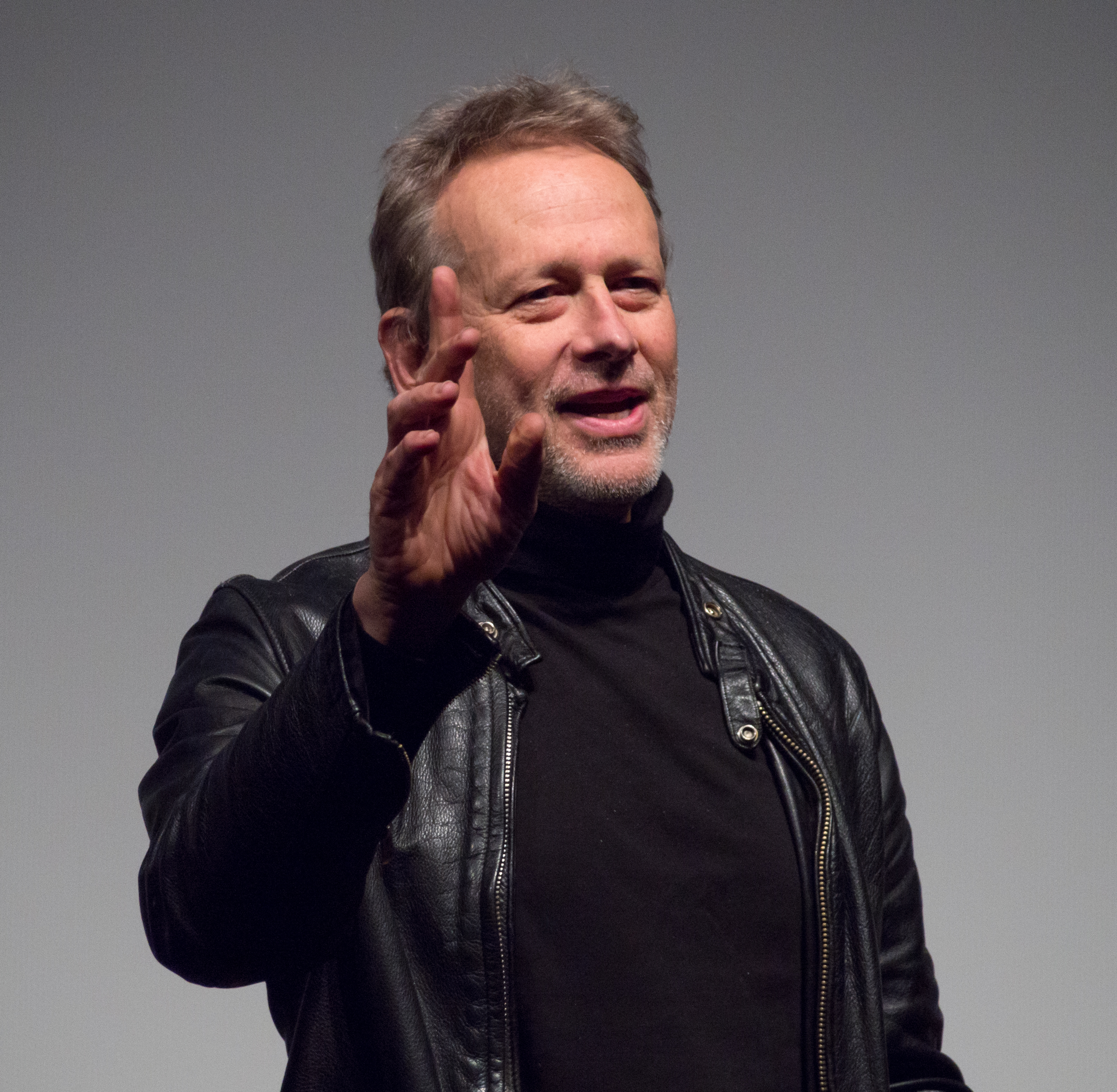
- Rockwell at the Tribeca Film Festival in 2018
- Born: August 18, 1956 (age 70); Boston, Massachusetts, U.S.
- Occupations: Screenwriter, producer, film director, professor
- Years active: 1983–present
- Spouses: Jennifer Beals (m. 1986; div. 1996) Karyn Parsons (m. 2003)
- Children: 2

Charles Alexandre Rockwell is an American film director, producer, screenwriter and professor.

== Life and career ==
Alexandre Rockwell is best known for his independent films made in NYC with a small group of actors he met on the lower east side in the late 80s. His first films helped launch the careers of well known actors like Steve Buscemi, Sam Rockwell, Peter Dinklage, Stanley Tucci, as well as many other notable indie stars of the time. His filming style is described as purely independent in spirit and poetic in style. He mixes a blend of comedy and drama to create a portrait of outsiders. His influences are wide-ranging, he has been quoted as saying his style is "as much the Three Stooges as it is Tarkovsky".

Rockwell was born into a family of artists, the grandson of the Russian animator Alexandre Alexeieff, inventor of the pinscreen, and Alexandra Grinevsky, a renowned artist and illustrator of rare books. His father, Paul Rockwell, met his mother, Svetlana Ludmillia Alexeieff, when he was an American GI in Paris and they married and relocated to Boston, Massachusetts. Growing up in Cambridge, Massachusetts, Rockwell struggled in school and often skipped class, spending his days playing pinball and sleeping in arthouse movie theaters. He avoided college and instead moved to Paris where he would sneak into the French Cinematheque to watch up to three films a day when he was not assisting his grandfather in his studio. He then relocated to New York City in his early 20s where he drove a taxi and delivered seltzer water. It was when he hocked his saxophone and bought a 16mm Bolex camera that he began making his own films.

In 1986 he met and within two weeks married actress Jennifer Beals. Beals introduced Sam Rockwell to Alexandre, who has subsequently cast Rockwell in four of his films. They are not related to each other.

Rockwell has made a number of New York indie films, most notably In the Soup, which won the Grand Jury Prize at Sundance in 1992, a seminal year for independent American film that presented the first feature-length films of Quentin Tarantino, Robert Rodriguez, and Allison Anders. Together the four directors made Four Rooms, which opened to mixed reviews and audience response. Rockwell followed up with Somebody to Love, starring Rosie Perez, Steve Buscemi, and Harvey Keitel. Rockwell struggled in Los Angeles while making Louis & Frank and Pete Smalls Is Dead. Both films were met with mixed reviews and he did not make a film for a period of six years. He left the west coast for New York City where he began teaching at NYU and met his present wife Karyn Parsons-Rockwell, with whom he has two children..

Most recently Rockwell has turned to smaller and more independent micro-budget films made with his family, students, and friends to much critical and festival success. His film Sweet Thing (2020) starred his daughter Lana Rockwell and son Nico Rockwell, and won the Crystal Bear at the 2019 Berlin Film Festival, and has been widely released to both audience and critical acclaim.

Rockwell currently is head of the directing program at NYU's graduate film school and resides in Brooklyn, New York. His wife, Karyn, has her own production company, Sweet Blackberry.

== Filmography ==
- Lenz (1982)
- Hero (1983)
- Sons (1990)
- In the Soup (1992)
- Somebody to Love (1994)
- Four Rooms (1995; segment "The Wrong Man")
- Louis & Frank (1998)
- 13 Moons (2002)
- Pete Smalls Is Dead (2010)
- Little Feet (2013)
- In the Same Garden (Omnibus) (2015)
- Sweet Thing (2020)
- Lump (2024)
- The Projectionist (2026)
