= Jo Andres =

American choreographer (1954–2019)

- Andres in 2015
- Born: Mary Jo Andres; May 21, 1954; Wichita, Kansas, U.S.
- Died: January 6, 2019 (aged 64); New York City, U.S.
- Other name: Jo Buscemi
- Occupations: Filmmaker; choreographer; artist
- Years active: 1992–2019
- Spouse: Steve Buscemi (m. 1987)
- Children: 1

Mary Jo Andres Buscemi (née Andres; May 21, 1954 – January 6, 2019) was an American filmmaker, choreographer, and artist.

== Career ==
Andres first became known on the kinetic downtown New York performance scene of the 1980s for her film/dance/light performances, shown at the Performing Garage, La Mama Experimental Theater Club P.S. 122, St. Marks Danspace, and the Collective for Living Cinema. As a filmmaker, Andres drew acclaim and awards for the 1996 film Black Kites, which aired on PBS and played several film festivals, including the Sundance, Berlin, Toronto, London, and Human Rights Watch Film Festivals. Andres directed music and art videos, as well as her own film performance works. Andres was a dance consultant to the Wooster Group.

She was an artist-in-residence at several leading universities, museums, and art colonies, including Yaddo and the Rockefeller Study Center in Triangolo lariano, Italy. Andres created a series of cyanotype photographs which can be seen on her website.

== Personal life and death ==
Andres married actor Steve Buscemi in 1987; they had one son, Lucian, born in 1990.

Andres died at her home in Brooklyn on January 6, 2019 at age 64. Andres's death was caused by complications stemming from ovarian cancer (more specifically, by encapsulating peritoneal sclerosis). A private memorial service was held on January 8, 2019.

== Filmography ==
- 1992: What Happened to Pete (directed by Steve Buscemi) (editor)
- 1996: Black Kites (director, editor, special effects director)
- 1998: Piece of Cake (music video for Mimi Goese) (director)
- 1998: The Impostors (choreographer)
- 2000: Lillian Kiesler: On The Head Of A Pin (director)
