= Primetime Emmy Award for Outstanding Short Form Variety Series =

Award for short-term media

- Awarded for: Outstanding Short Form Variety Series
- Country: United States
- Presented by: Academy of Television Arts & Sciences
- First award: 2016 (awarded to Park Bench with Steve Buscemi)
- Final award: 2020 (awarded to Carpool Karaoke: The Series)
- Website: emmys.com

This is a list of winners and nominees of the Primetime Emmy Award for Outstanding Short Form Variety Series. The category was initiated in 2016 alongside Outstanding Short Form Comedy or Drama Series and Outstanding Short Form Nonfiction or Reality Series. The awards replaced the now-retired category for Outstanding Short-Format Live-Action Entertainment Program. In 2021, this award was merged with Outstanding Short Form Comedy or Drama Series to form the Primetime Emmy Award for Outstanding Short Form Comedy, Drama or Variety Series. These awards were not presented at the Primetime Emmy Awards show, but at the Creative Arts Emmy Award show.

== Winners and nominations ==
indicates the winner

=== 2010s ===
Year	Program	Producers	Network
2016 (68th)
2016 (68th)	Park Bench with Steve Buscemi	Steve Buscemi, Stanley Tucci, Wren Arthur, Justin Wilkes, Joe Killian and Jon Doran, executive producers	AOL
2016 (68th)	Epic Rap Battles of History	Peter Shukoff and Lloyd Ahlquist, executive producers	YouTube
2016 (68th)	Gay of Thrones	Erin Gibson, executive producer; Matt Mazany and Ross Buran, producers	funnyordie.com
2016 (68th)	Honest Trailers	Andy Signore and Barry Blumberg, executive producers; Dan Murrell and Spencer Gilbert, producers	YouTube
2016 (68th)	Making a Scene with James Franco	Vince Jolivette, Eric Day, Jen Heftler, Jay Davis and Mark Koops, executive producers; James Franco, host/principal performer	AOL
2017 (69th)
2017 (69th)	The Daily Show — Between the Scenes	Trevor Noah, executive producer/host; Jen Flanz and Steve Bodow, executive producers; Ramin Hedayati, supervising producer; Jocelyn Conn, produced by	thedailyshow.com
2017 (69th)	Behind The Voice	Chad Hines, executive producer; Amanda Horning, supervising producer; Suzanne Lee, producer	YouTube
2017 (69th)	Epic Rap Battles of History	Peter Shukoff and Lloyd Ahlquist, executive producers	YouTube
2017 (69th)	Honest Trailers	Andy Signore, executive producer; Dan Murrell, Spencer Gilbert, Michael Bolton and Christina Kline, producers	YouTube
2017 (69th)	The Star Wars Show	Mickey Capoferri, executive producer; Scott Bromley and John Harper, producers; Andi Gutierrez, host	YouTube
2018 (70th)
2018 (70th)	Carpool Karaoke: The Series	Ben Winston, James Corden and Eric Pankowski, executive producer; Sheila Rogers, supervising producer	Apple Music
2018 (70th)	Creating Saturday Night Live	Lorne Michaels, executive producer; Oz Rodriguez, Chris Voss and Matt Yonks, co-executive producers; Michael Scogin, supervising producer; and Erin Doyle, producer	nbc.com
2018 (70th)	The Daily Show — Between the Scenes	Trevor Noah, executive producer/host; Jen Flanz and Steve Bodow, executive producers; Ramin Hedayati, supervising producer; Matt Negrin, producer; Jocelyn Conn, produced by	thedailyshow.com
2018 (70th)	Gay of Thrones	Erin Gibson, Jonathan Van Ness, Kate Lilly and Matt Mazany, executive producers; Ross Buran, producer	Funny or Die
2018 (70th)	Honest Trailers	Dan Murrell, Spencer Gilbert and Joe Starr, producers	YouTube
2018 (70th)	The Tonight Show Starring Jimmy Fallon – Cover Room	Jimmy Fallon, executive producer; Chris Tartaro, Chad Wollett, and Julie Gurovitsch, producers; Gerard Bradford and Mike DiCenzo, produced by	nbc.com
2019 (71st)
2019 (71st)	Carpool Karaoke: The Series	Ben Winston, James Corden and Eric Pankowski, executive producers; David Young and Sheila Rogers, supervising producers; Diana Miller, producer	Apple Music
2019 (71st)	Billy on the Street	Billy Eichner, executive producer/host; Mike Farah, Doug Brady and Bill Parker, executive producers; Elizabeth Baquet and Ciara Pavia, producers	Funny or Die
2019 (71st)	Gay of Thrones	Erin Gibson, Jonathan Van Ness and Mike Farah, executive producers; Matt Mazany, co-executive producer; Ross Buran, supervising producer; Whitney Hodack, produced by	Funny or Die
2019 (71st)	Honest Trailers	Spencer Gilbert, Dan Murrell and Joe Starr, producers	YouTube
2019 (71st)	The Randy Rainbow Show	Randy Rainbow, executive producer; Tanase Popa, John Retsios, Rich Super and Jeff Romley, producers	YouTube

=== 2020s ===
Year	Program	Producers	Network
2020 (72nd)
2020 (72nd)	Carpool Karaoke: The Series	Ben Winston and James Corden, executive producers; David Young, co-executive producer; Sheila Rogers, supervising producer; Diana Miller and Blake Webster, producers	Apple TV
2020 (72nd)	Being at Home with Samantha Bee	Samantha Bee, executive producer/host; Jason Jones, executive producer; Allana Harkin, co-executive producer; Elisa Kreisinger, Mike Drucker and Kristen Bartlett, producers	TBS
2020 (72nd)	Between Two Ferns with Zach Galifianakis: The Movie, Sorta Uncut Interviews	Scott Aukerman, Zach Galifianakis, Mike Farah and Caitlin Daley, executive producers; Corinne Eckart, producer	Netflix
2020 (72nd)	Jimmy Kimmel's Quarantine Minilogues	Jimmy Kimmel and Jill Leiderman, executive producers; Molly McNearney, co-executive producer; Tony Romero and Seth Weidner, supervising producers; Danny Ricker, producer	ABC
2020 (72nd)	The Randy Rainbow Show	Randy Rainbow, executive producer; John Retsios, Jeff Romley and Victoria Varela, producers	YouTube

== Programs with multiple awards ==
3 awards

- Carpool Karaoke: The Series

== Programs with multiple nominations ==
Totals include nominations for Outstanding Special Class — Short-Format Nonfiction Programs.

4 nominations

- Honest Trailers

3 nominations

- Carpool Karaoke: The Series
- Gay of Thrones

2 nominations

- The Daily Show — Between the Scenes
- Epic Rap Battles of History
- Park Bench with Steve Buscemi
- The Randy Rainbow Show
