= Somebody to Love (1994 film) =

- Directed by: Alexandre Rockwell
- Written by: Sergei Bodrov; Alexandre Rockwell
- Starring: Rosie Perez; Harvey Keitel; Anthony Quinn; Michael DeLorenzo; Steve Buscemi; Stanley Tucci; Quentin Tarantino
- Cinematography: Robert D. Yeoman
- Edited by: Elena Maganini
- Music by: Mader
- Distributed by: Legacy Releasing
- Release date: 1994
- Country: United States
- Language: English

Somebody to Love is a 1994 American romantic-drama film directed by Alexandre Rockwell. It is inspired by Federico Fellini's Nights of Cabiria. It entered the competition at the 51st Venice International Film Festival.

== Premise ==
Mercedes (Rosie Perez) is a taxi dancer who wants to be an actress. She's involved with a married man named Harry (Harvey Keitel), who considers himself to be respected actor. Ernesto (Michael DeLorenzo) is in love with Mercedes, but he doesn't dance or have money.

== Cast ==
- Rosie Perez as Mercedes
- Harvey Keitel as Harry Harrelson
- Anthony Quinn as Emillio
- Michael DeLorenzo as Ernesto
- Steve Buscemi as Mickey
- Stanley Tucci as George
- Gerardo Mejía as Armando
- Steven Randazzo as Nick
- Paul Herman as "Pinky"
- Samuel Fuller as Sam Silverman
- Quentin Tarantino as The Bartender
- Sam Rockwell as Polish Guy
- Victor Argo as Santa Claus
- Elizabeth Bracco as Taxi Dancer
- Brie Howard as Band Member
- Yul Vazquez as The Waiter
