= Trees Lounge =

- Theatrical release poster
- Directed by: Steve Buscemi
- Written by: Steve Buscemi
- Produced by: Brad Wyman; Chris Hanley
- Starring: Steve Buscemi; Chloë Sevigny; Mark Boone Junior; Anthony LaPaglia; Elizabeth Bracco; Eszter Balint; Carol Kane; Daniel Baldwin; Mimi Rogers; Debi Mazar; Seymour Cassel; Samuel L. Jackson
- Cinematography: Lisa Rinzler
- Edited by: Kate Williams
- Music by: Evan Lurie
- Production companies: Live Entertainment; Seneca; Addis/Wechsler
- Distributed by: Orion Classics
- Release dates: May 11, 1996 (Directors' Fortnight); October 11, 1996 (United States)
- Running time: 95 minutes
- Language: English
- Box office: $749,741

Trees Lounge is a 1996 American independent black comedy film written and directed by Steve Buscemi in his writing and directorial debut. It was produced by Brad Wyman and Chris Hanley and features a large ensemble cast of actors, including Buscemi, Anthony LaPaglia, Chloë Sevigny, and Samuel L. Jackson. The film's black humor is based on examination of characters' self-destructive behavior, revolving around their shared hangout of the eponymous bar and lounge.

Critical reception was mostly positive. Trees Lounge has also been cited as an influence by The Sopranos creator David Chase, who later hired Buscemi to direct "Pine Barrens" and three other episodes of the show, and to star as Tony Soprano's cousin Tony Blundetto during the show's fifth season.

It was filmed in Glendale, Queens, Brooklyn and Valley Stream, New York.

== Plot ==
Tommy Basilio is an alcoholic and fixture at a local bar, the Trees Lounge, who loses his girlfriend of eight years and his job as a mechanic. Tommy's main social contacts are his brother Raymond, the bar's servers Connie and Harry, and a few of the bar's other regulars including the drug-using Mike and the elderly Bill. Tommy and Bill are also neighbors who live in a pair of rented rooms above the bar.

After his Uncle Al dies while driving his ice cream truck, Tommy goes to his wake and indulges in cocaine with Raymond and their cousin. Tommy takes them to the Trees Lounge to carry on drinking, but a brawl breaks out between his cousin and Mike. After buying more beer at a late-night convenience store, Mike and Tommy discuss how Tommy stole money from Rob, the owner of the garage where he lost his job. They discuss how Rob is dating Tommy's pregnant ex-girlfriend Theresa, with the child's paternity in doubt.

Mike turns out to be the owner of the moving company across the street from the Trees Lounge. Tommy asks for work, but Mike says he doesn't need a mechanic. Tommy takes on Uncle Al's ice-cream route, but children initially do not buy from him. Theresa's flirtatious seventeen-year-old niece, Debbie, joins Tommy on his route, saying she had a dream about him. Mike's wife and daughter have left him because of his drinking and tell him they plan to move upstate. Debbie and friend Kelly go to the Trees Lounge but are unable to prove they are of legal drinking age. Debbie claims her 'boyfriend' Tommy will vouch for her. Mike, Tommy and the two girls go to Mike's house for more drinking but are asked to leave when Mike's wife calls.

Tommy and Debbie spend the night together at his place. Realizing her father, Jerry, might not forgive her, Debbie calls Tommy and asks to stay with him, but he fears Jerry's reaction and turns her down. She instead decides to leave town with her friend Puck to stay with a cousin in New York City. Jerry meanwhile tries to reconstruct his daughter's steps, and visits Trees Lounge to ask questions. The next day, as Tommy sits in the ice cream truck outside a baseball game, chatting with Mike and his wife, Jerry tracks him down. The irate father bashes him on the head with a baseball bat, smashes the lights and windows of the ice-cream truck, and throws all of Tommy's money and ice cream into the parking lot where they are confiscated by gleeful children. After Theresa has her baby, Tommy goes to the hospital and tries to make amends. When Tommy returns to the Trees Lounge, he hears that Bill collapsed and was taken to the hospital in critical condition. Connie and the other regulars discuss how someone should visit Bill in the hospital, but they forget about him as they carry on drinking. Tommy sits in Bill's favorite seat and drinks a bottle of beer, realizing what his life has become.

== Cast ==
- Steve Buscemi as Tommy Basilio
- Chloë Sevigny as Debbie
- Mark Boone Junior as Mike
- Anthony LaPaglia as Rob
- Elizabeth Bracco as Theresa
- Eszter Balint as Marie
- Carol Kane as Connie
- Daniel Baldwin as Jerry
- Mimi Rogers as Patty
- Joe Lisi as Harry
- Debi Mazar as Crystal
- Seymour Cassel as Uncle Al
- Samuel L. Jackson as Wendell
- Larry Gilliard Jr. as James
- Michael Imperioli as George
- Charlie Newmark as Puck
- Kevin Corrigan as Matthew
- Michael Buscemi as Raymond
- John Ventimiglia as Johnny
- Bianca Hunter as Kelly
- Suzanne Shepherd as Jackie
- Rockets Redglare as Stan
- Bronson Dudley as Bill

== Release ==
The film premiered at the Directors' Fortnight at the 1996 Cannes Film Festival on May 11, 1996. It was released theatrically in two theaters in the United States on October 11, 1996.

== Reception ==
On the review aggregator Rotten Tomatoes, 81% of 26 critics' reviews are positive, with an average rating of 6.9/10. Metacritic, which uses a weighted average, assigned the film a score of 76 out of 100, based on 24 critics, indicating "generally favorable" reviews. Roger Ebert gave the film 3½ stars out of 4: "Steve Buscemi, who plays Tommy and also wrote and directed the film, knows about alcoholism from the inside out and backward, and his movie is the most accurate portrait of the daily saloon drinker I have ever seen."

Trees Lounge earned Buscemi nominations for Best First Screenplay as well as Best First Feature (along with producers Brad Wyman and Chris Wyman) at the 1997 Independent Spirit Awards. At the 1997 Chlotrudis Awards, the film was nomintated for Best Director. In parallel to the Cannes Film Festival, the film was screened for the 1996 Directors' Fortnight (Quinzaine des Réalizateurs).

== Music ==
The soundtrack of Trees Lounge combines jazz standards, pop ballads, and rock songs. It features recordings by The Ink Spots, Brenda Lee, The Mills Brothers, and Shane MacGowan and The Popes, alongside original contributions from Patrick Tuzzolino, Craig Ross, and Evan Lurie. An official soundtrack album, Trees Lounge: Original Soundtrack, was released on October 8, 1996.
