= Park Bench with Steve Buscemi =

- Genre: Talk show Comedy
- Directed by: Steve Buscemi
- Starring: Steve Buscemi; Gino Orlando; Michael Buscemi
- Country of origin: United States
- Original language: English
- No. of seasons: 2
- No. of episodes: 25

Production
- Executive producers: Steve Buscemi; Stanley Tucci; Wren Arthur; Justin Wilkes; Joe Killian; Jon Doran
- Running time: 10 minutes
- Production companies: Olive Productions; Radical Media

Original release
- Network: AOL
- Release: May 15, 2014 – September 3, 2015

Park Bench with Steve Buscemi is an American web series talk show created, directed and hosted by actor Steve Buscemi, distributed by digital network AOL. The series premiered on May 15, 2014. In each episode, Buscemi interviews a famous friend, former co-worker or everyday person in New York City.

== Production ==
The show was conceived when Buscemi met Gino Orlando, his sidekick on the series, while directing promotional shorts for Vampire Weekend. "When we saw the footage," Buscemi said, "Geo was so natural and just a great sidekick, if you will, that I said to my producing partner and our producing team, 'I think I can build a whole show out of Geo and I on park benches.'" His brother Michael Buscemi appears as a rival talk show host.

Each season was shot digitally in five days, in interior and exterior locations. The titular bench is a prop brought to each filming location, including the Metropolitan Museum of Art, Julian Schnabel's home and various bars and restaurants in the New York area.

== Awards ==
In September 2016, the series won the Primetime Emmy Award for Outstanding Short Form Variety Series. The win was Buscemi's first out of eight Emmy nominations. The series had been nominated for Outstanding Short-Format Nonfiction Program in 2014.

== Episodes ==
Season	Episodes	Originally released	
Season	Episodes	First released	Last released
1	13	May 15, 2014	July 10, 2014
2	12	June 18, 2015	September 3, 2015

=== Season 1 (2014) ===
No. overall	No. in season	Title	Guests	Release date
1	1	"Bench Rivalry"	Anthony Laciura, Chris Rock, Janeane Garofalo	May 15, 2014
Steve Buscemi has a new show idea but Chris Rock has his doubts. Actor Anthony Laciura sits down to help, but Steve's brother Michael has his own ideas.
2	2	"Hair Apparent"	Rosie Perez	May 15, 2014
Rosie Perez takes a seat on the bench to talk about where she comes from, Geo leaves for important business, and Michael helps Rosie to her next appointment.
3	3	"Close But No Cigar"	Billy Connolly, Colin Quinn	May 15, 2014
Steve sits and smokes e-cigars with Billy Connolly. Later, Steve works connections with his brother Michael to get Colin Quinn as a possible guest.
4	4	"Benchmark"	Rosanne Cash, Michael Shannon, Joel Grey	May 15, 2014
Steve hosts his biggest show yet. With a live audience, Steve talks with Rosanne Cash about her southern roots, while Michael Shannon needs new shoelaces.
5	5	"Parklandia"	Fred Armisen	June 9, 2014
Fred Armisen is running late for an appearance on another talking show, but takes a moment to reminisce with Steve about a play they did together.
6	6	"No Try, Just Do"	Tim McHenry, Ani Trime Lhamo	June 9, 2014
After a tour of Himalayan art with Rubin Museum Program Director Tim McHenry, Steve and Buddhist nun Ani Trime Lhamo sit down, be quiet, and see what happens.
7	7	"It's a Girl's World"	GZA	June 9, 2014
Steve talks to GZA from the Wu-Tang Clan about his lyrical influences before heading to the Lower Eastside Girls Club to meet some higher dimensional beings.
8	8	"Bill of Approval"	Bill de Blasio	June 9, 2014
Steve surveys the public and shares their concerns with NYC Mayor Bill de Blasio. At last, Geo may have found someone to trust.
9	9	"Fun with Dick and Debbie"	Dick Cavett, Debbie Harry	June 9, 2014
Dick Cavett hosts an unexpected guest while Steve, Geo, and Michael observe the rules of conversation.
10	10	"Cobbler, Butcher, Biker"	Tom McCarthy, Bobby Cannavale	July 10, 2014
Steve talks to Tom McCarthy about his upcoming film The Cobbler and Bobby Cannavale cuts in to debate the carnivorous origins of Italian-American names.
11	11	"A Carrot Is a Diamond for a Rabbit"	Julian Schnabel	July 10, 2014
Steve and Julian Schnabel drink tequila while discussing natural light, biblical film scenes, signal flags and immortality.
12	12	"Bench Rap"	Method Man, Ad-Rock, Mike D	July 10, 2014
Method Man and Geo share their emotions and Steve plays ball with Beastie Boys Ad-Rock and Mike D.
13	13	"One Fine Finale, Life Accordion to Steve"	Michael Kenneth Williams, Jake La Botz, Jessica Williams	July 10, 2014
Steve and Geo mix it up with Michael Kenneth Williams, musician Jake La Botz and The Daily Show's Jessica Williams before warming the bench with brother Michael.

=== Season 2 (2015) ===
No. overall	No. in season	Title	Guests	Release date
14	1	"Every Dog Has Its Day"	Triumph the Insult Comic Dog	June 18, 2015
Steve Buscemi sits down for a second season of Park Bench with brother Michael, co-host Geo, and bandleader Anthony Laciura. Triumph the Insult Comic Dog teaches Steve some new tricks.
15	2	"Sidekicker"	Debi Mazar, Kenan Thompson	June 25, 2015
Steve and Geo discuss their future, Debi Mazar talks about an elevator ride with Madonna, while Kenan Thompson takes off on a new career.
16	3	"No Fools, No Fun"	Mark Boone Junior, Puss n Boots	July 2, 2015
Geo takes a meeting with Michael, while Steve and potential co-host Mark Boone Junior unwittingly audition the band Puss n Boots (Norah Jones, Catherine Popper and Sasha Dobson).
17	4	"Back in the Day"	Jim Jarmusch	July 9, 2015
Jim Jarmusch talks to Steve, Geo and Michael about music, movies, and the virtues of being an amateur.
18	5	"La Neighbor Delight"	Siri Hustvedt, Paul Auster	July 16, 2015
Geo nixes the guest list, while Steve runs into neighbor John Turturro and Michael shows up to wrestle. Later at La Bagel Delight, the folly of a quote is revealed by writers Siri Hustvedt and Paul Auster.
19	6	"I.O.U."	John Oliver	July 23, 2015
John Oliver pays a debt, Geo recommends a do over and Steve gets a second chance with the Last Week Tonight host.
20	7	"Orange Is the New Steve"	Piper Kerman, Glenn E. Martin, Jackie Cruz, Annie Golden, Michelle Hurst	July 30, 2015
Steve sits with Piper Kerman. Glenn E. Martin joins to discuss Just Leadership USA, while Geo and Michael Bench Talk with Orange Is the New Black cast members Michelle Hurst, Annie Golden, and Jackie Cruz.
21	8	"Sound Salvation"	Elvis Costello	August 6, 2015
Steve meets up with Elvis Costello in Geo's old neighborhood to discuss sweets, dance bands, Springsteen and growing up in a musical family. Michael joins to hear Elvis perform "Radio Soul."
22	9	"Park Mensch"	Gilbert Gottfried	August 13, 2015
Steve talks to Gilbert Gottfried about being a stand up guy. Travis and Geo try to pull a fast one, and Michael sees an opportunity.
23	10	"Truth Be Told"	Justin Vivian Bond, Zosia Mamet	August 20, 2015
Geo and Steve take a coffee break with performer Justin Vivian Bond, musicians Thomas Bartlett, NathAnn Carrera, and Claudia Chopek. Girls actor Zosia Mamet fast talks Steve, Travis asks for a favor and Michael saves the day.
24	11	"Leading Lady"	Letitia James	August 27, 2015
Steve and Geo search high and low for New Yorkers to share their concerns with Public Advocate Letitia James.
25	12	"All In"	Kathy Najimy, Amber Tamblyn, Bridget Everett, David Blaine	September 3, 2015
Steve plays poker with actors Kathy Najimy, Amber Tamblyn and Bridget Everett. David Blaine raises the stakes. Then Geo, Michael, Steve and Anthony join Miwa Gemini and the Main Squeeze Orchestra for a grand finale.
