= Animal Factory =

2000 film by Steve Buscemi

- DVD cover
- Directed by: Steve Buscemi
- Screenplay by: Edward Bunker; John Steppling
- Based on: The Animal Factory by Edward Bunker
- Produced by: Steve Buscemi; Elie Samaha; Andrew Stevens; Julie Yorn; Danny Trejo; Edward Bunker; Tracee Stanley
- Starring: Willem Dafoe; Edward Furlong; Danny Trejo; John Heard; Mickey Rourke; Tom Arnold; Mark Boone Junior; Steve Buscemi; Seymour Cassel
- Cinematography: Phil Parmet
- Edited by: Kate Williams
- Music by: John Lurie
- Production company: Franchise Pictures
- Distributed by: Silver Nitrate
- Release dates: January 24, 2000 (Sundance); October 13, 2000 (Los Angeles)
- Running time: 94 minutes
- Country: United States
- Language: English
- Budget: $3.6 million
- Box office: $43,805

Animal Factory is a 2000 American independent neo-noir film directed by Steve Buscemi and starring Willem Dafoe, Edward Furlong, Danny Trejo, John Heard, Mickey Rourke, Tom Arnold, Seymour Cassel, Shell Galloway and Mark Boone, Jr. Set in San Quentin, the film is about life in prison. It is based on the novel of the same name by Eddie Bunker who plays the part of Buzzard in the film.

== Plot ==
Ron Decker, a twenty-one-year-old young man convicted for drug possession, is sent to prison where veteran con Earl Copen takes Decker under his wing and introduces him into his own gang. Copen first helps out Decker when three Puerto Ricans attempt to lure him into a cell block to rape him. Copen sees through their plans and talks to the Puerto Ricans, who quickly abandon interest in Decker.

Over the next few days, Copen helps Decker out by getting him better jobs, food, and even transferring him to his own cell block. Mainly Copen helps Decker's case and points out that under a new article passed by the legislature, a judge can modify a sentence in the first 120 days if he sees fit, so Copen (who is the assistant to the Captain of the Guards) helps write false reports and gives Decker advice to stay out of trouble, which will make Decker appear as a "very small threat to society". Unfortunately, after a large inmate called Buck Rowan attempts to sexually assault Decker in the bathroom, Decker stabs Rowan in a fight involving Copen, paralyzing Rowan. Rowan signs a statement claiming Decker and Copen are responsible and their cells are stripped and they are restricted to them.

Decker's attempt at a modified sentence is denied and his sentence remains five years. Meanwhile, Copen manages to get word out Rowan is "snitching", and an inmate working at the infirmary poisons Rowan's IV with cleaning fluid. The case against Copen and Decker is thrown out as the victim and main witness is dead.

Shortly after their release, Copen tells Decker he plans to escape, and they plot to hide in a garbage truck and avoid being crushed by the compressor by using a bar to stop it. Decker escapes in one truck, but Copen is unable to jump into the truck after the appearance of one of the prison guards. Decker attempts to flee to Costa Rica and Copen stays behind, after stating "This is my prison, after all" and quoting Satan from Paradise Lost by John Milton: "Better to reign in hell than serve in heaven."

== Cast ==
- Willem Dafoe as Earl Copen
- Edward Furlong as Ron Decker
- Danny Trejo as Vito
- John Heard as James Decker
- Mickey Rourke as Jan, The Actress
- Tom Arnold as Buck Rowan
- Seymour Cassel as Lieutenant Seeman
- Mark Boone, Jr. as Paul Adams
- Edward Bunker as "Buzzard"
- Shell Galloway as Johnny "Handsome"
- Michael Buscemi as Mr. Herrell
- Jake LaBotz as Jesse
- Chris Bauer as "Bad Eye"
- Mark Webber as "Tank"
- Steve Buscemi as A.R. Hosspack
- Larry Fessenden (Larry Fesendon in credits) as Benny

Anohni makes a cameo appearance as a prisoner performing at a musical night in the prison.

== Production ==
Animal Factory was filmed at Holmesburg Prison in Philadelphia, Pennsylvania. Filming was completed in 30 days, two days longer than originally scheduled. Buscemi employed hundreds of prisoners from Curran-Fromhold Correctional Facility, the prison that replaced Holmesburg Prison in 1995.

The film is based upon the novel of the same name by writer Edward Bunker. Bunker, who has a small part in the film, also co-starred alongside Animal Factory's director Buscemi in Quentin Tarantino's Reservoir Dogs.

== Reception ==
The film received positive reviews. It was highly praised at the Sundance Film Festival. On Rotten Tomatoes, it has an approval rating of 83% based on reviews from 35 critics, with an average rating of 6.90/10. The site’s critics consensus reads, "Animal Factory is an honest attempt at a humanizing prison drama that stumbles with its performances but Buscemi's ambitious directing makes up for it." On Metacritic, it has a score of 65% based on reviews from 12 critics, indicating "generally favorable" reviews.

Elvis Mitchell of The New York Times wrote: "Willem Dafoe steals the picture with his comic timing." Gene Seymour of the Los Angeles Times called it "One of the least sensationalistic--and therefore, more unsettlingly plausible--visions of prison life ever transfigured into big-screen drama." Alex Raynor of Empire magazine wrote: "Steady-handed direction and a number of strong performances allow Animal Factory to maintain a decent balance between prison violence and inmate camaraderie, making for a well-paced and thoughtful prison drama." Leonard Maltin places the film in his book 151 Best Movies You've Never Seen.
