= Steve Buscemi =

American actor (born 1957)

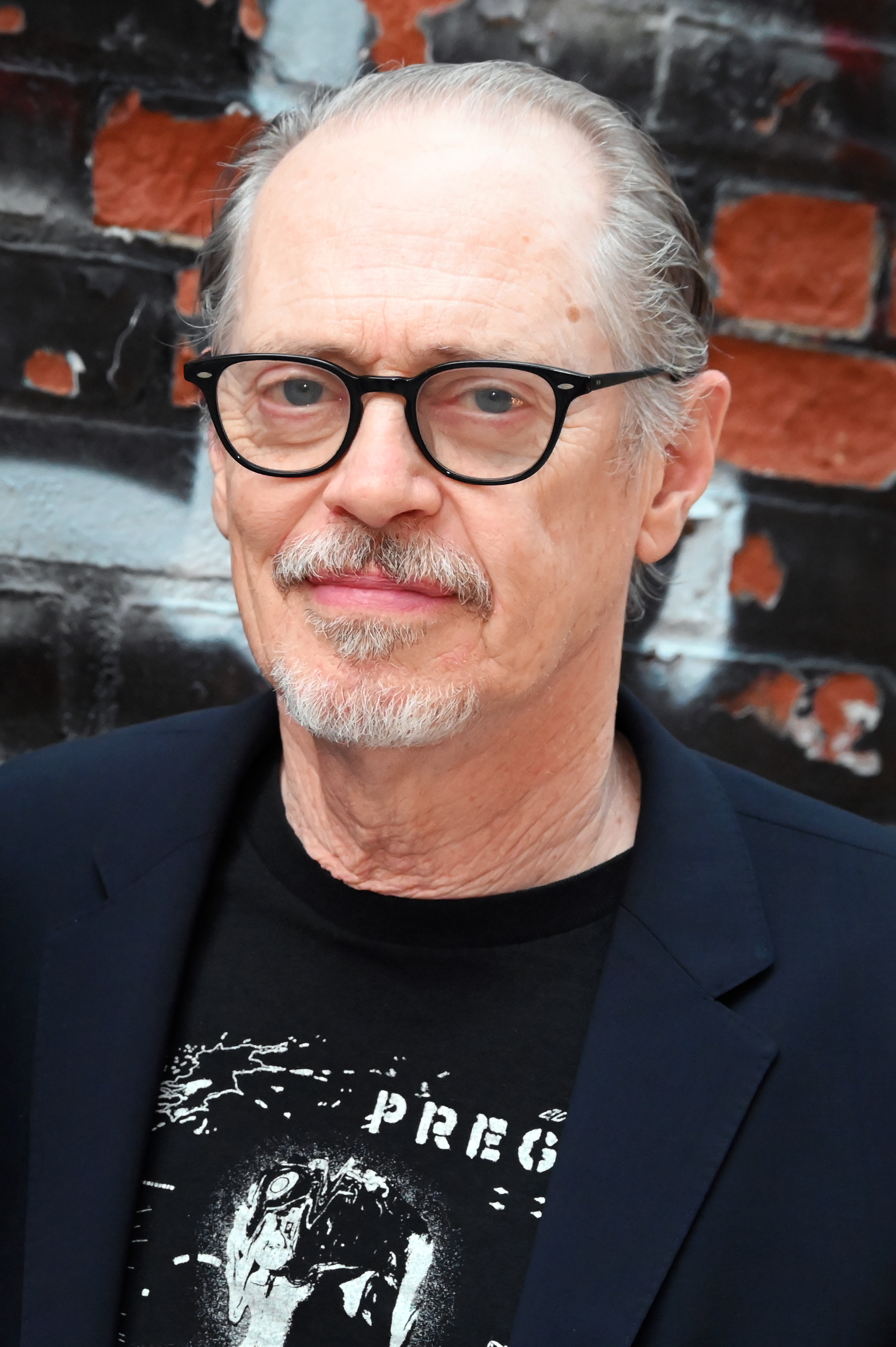
- Buscemi in 2026
- Born: Steven Vincent Buscemi; December 13, 1957 (age 68); New York City, U.S.
- Occupations: Actor; director; producer
- Years active: 1983–present
- Works: Full list
- Spouse(s): Jo Andres (m. 1987; died 2019) Karen Ho (m. 2025)
- Children: 1
- Relatives: Michael Buscemi (brother)
- Awards: Full list

Steven Vincent Buscemi (/buːˈsɛmi/ boo-SEH-mee, (Note: As stated in interviews by Buscemi himself. It is common for people to pronounce his name /buːˈʃeɪmi/ or /buːˈʃɛmi/ instead.) Italian: [buʃˈʃɛːmi]; born December 13, 1957) is an American actor, director, producer, and retired firefighter. His accolades include two Emmy Awards, a Golden Globe Award and two Independent Spirit Awards.

Buscemi started his acting career with the independent productions Parting Glances (1986), Mystery Train (1989), and In the Soup (1992), followed by his breakthrough role as Mr. Pink in Quentin Tarantino's Reservoir Dogs (1992). The 1990 film Miller's Crossing marked his first of many projects with the Coen brothers, and the 1994 film Airheads was his first collaboration with comedic actor-filmmaker Adam Sandler. Throughout the 1990s, he continued to appear in a number of both independent and mainstream films, including Billy Madison, Living in Oblivion, Desperado (all 1995), Fargo (1996), Con Air (1997), Armageddon, The Big Lebowski (both 1998). In following decades, he starred in films Ghost World (2001), Mr. Deeds, Spy Kids 2: The Island of Lost Dreams (both 2002), Big Fish (2003), Grown Ups (2010), The Death of Stalin (2017), and Hubie Halloween (2020), alongside voice roles in the animated Monsters, Inc. (2001, 2013) and Hotel Transylvania film series (2012–2022).

Buscemi's career expanded into television, debuting with his first major role in the 1989 miniseries Lonesome Dove. He received his first two Emmy nominations for starring in and directing episodes of The Sopranos (2004–2006), before winning the Golden Globe Award for Best Actor for portraying Enoch "Nucky" Thompson in the HBO series Boardwalk Empire (2010–2014). His other television credits include 30 Rock (2007–2013), Horace and Pete (2016), and Miracle Workers (2019–2023). He won a News & Documentary Emmy Award in 2015 for his work with Independent Lens and the Primetime Emmy Award for Outstanding Short Form Variety Series the following year for his web talk show Park Bench with Steve Buscemi. Aside from acting, Buscemi has also directed the films Trees Lounge (1996), Animal Factory (2000), and Interview (2007), as well as a number of television episodes.

== Early life and education ==
Steven Vincent Buscemi was born on December 13, 1957, in the borough of Brooklyn in New York City, to Dorothy (née Wilson) and John Buscemi. His father was a sanitation worker and served in the Korean War, and his mother was a hostess at Howard Johnson's. Buscemi's paternal ancestors were from the Sicilian town of Menfi and his mother is of English and Dutch ancestry. He has three brothers: Jon, Ken, and Michael. Buscemi was raised Catholic.

When Buscemi was 10 years old, the family moved from East New York to Valley Stream in Nassau County. Buscemi graduated in 1975 from Valley Stream Central High School along with future writer Edward J. Renehan Jr. and future actress Patricia Charbonneau. In high school, Buscemi wrestled for the varsity squad and participated in the drama troupe. (Buscemi's 1996 film Trees Lounge, in which he starred and served as screenwriter and director, is set in and was largely shot in his childhood village of Valley Stream.) In 1977, Buscemi took the New York City Firefighter's exam and joined Engine Company 55, fighting fires for four years. Following the September 11 attacks, he temporarily rejoined Engine Company 55 to serve at the site of the World Trade Center.

== Career ==
=== 1985–1989: Early roles ===
Before making his film debut, Buscemi was a regular live performer at the Pyramid Cocktail Lounge and other downtown no wave venues. For many years, he performed comic skits with Mark Boone Junior. In 1988, they presented as a duo called Buscemi and Boone an evening of original black comedy at La MaMa Experimental Theatre Club that they called In Your Mind, with one extended playlet titled Two Americans in Paris. Two Americans in Paris was set in Paris in the 1960s and portrayed manipulative confrontations between two young American men in a bistro. Prominent solo performances were given in John Jesurun's Chang in a Void Moon series, as well as appearing in an adaptation of William Shakespeare's play Titus Andronicus, directed by Kęstutis Nakas. Buscemi made his film debut in the 1985 film The Way It Is or Eurydice in the Avenues, directed by Eric Mitchell, which was part of the no wave cinema movement. Other early performances include a role in the Christine Vachon-directed short Days Are Numbered (1986), Parting Glances (1986) as well as an appearance in an episode of the television series Miami Vice in 1986. During this period of time, Buscemi auditioned for and lost out on a number of roles including Biloxi Blues (1986), Tin Men (1987), and The Last Temptation of Christ (1988).

In 1989, he appeared in four films, including James Ivory's comedy Slaves of New York, Howard Brookner's ensemble period film Bloodhounds of Broadway and the New York Stories segment directed by Martin Scorsese entitled, "Life Lessons" starring alongside Nick Nolte and Rosanna Arquette. The film screened out of competition at the 1989 Cannes Film Festival to mixed reviews with the Scorsese segment being hailed as the standout by Roger Ebert. Buscemi also appeared in Jim Jarmusch's independent film Mystery Train (1989) as Charlie the Barber, and was nominated for the Independent Spirit Award for Best Supporting Male.

=== 1990–1998: Rise to prominence ===
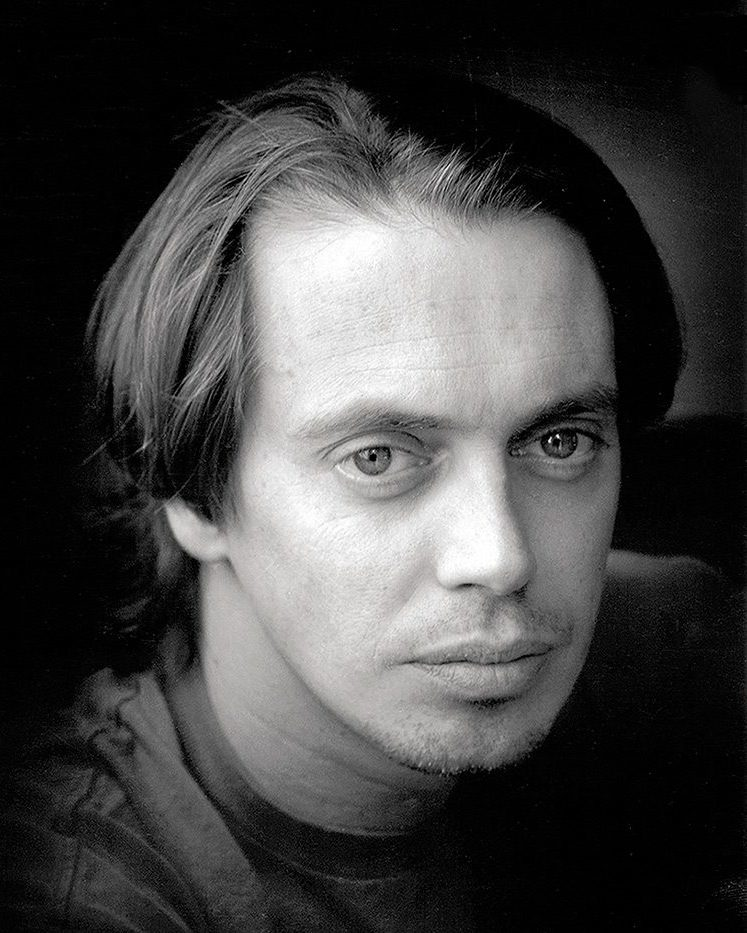
Buscemi in 1996

In 1990, he played Mink Larouie in the Coen Brothers' neo-noir gangster film Millers Crossing starring opposite Gabriel Byrne, Marcia Gay Harden, and John Turturro. This was the first of five of the Coen Brothers' films in which Buscemi performed. Critic Roger Ebert described the film as one that "is likely to be most appreciated by movie lovers who will enjoy its resonance with films of the past." Also that year, he starred as Test Tube, a henchman of Laurence Fishburne's character Jimmy Jump in Abel Ferrara's crime film King of New York, as well as Edward in the anthology film Tales from the Darkside: The Movie, the protagonist of the "Lot 249" segment of the film. In 1991, he played a bellboy, Chet, in the Coen Brothers film black comedy Barton Fink starring John Turturro and John Goodman. His first lead role was as Adolpho Rollo in Alexandre Rockwell's In the Soup (1992).

He gained wider attention for his supporting part as pseudonymous criminal Mr. Pink in Quentin Tarantino's crime film Reservoir Dogs (1992), a role that Tarantino originally wrote for himself, and one that earned Buscemi the Independent Spirit Award for Best Supporting Male in his second nomination. Buscemi considered the part to be a significant role for his career, explaining: "One because of the film itself, and [Tarantino's] writing and direction but also in the opening credits he put our names to our faces and I think that was like the first time casting people - or people who kinda knew my face but not my name went 'oh, oh that's who that is, okay' so that - that was huge and that I think opened a lot of doors." Also in 1992, he had a guest role as Phil Hickle, Ellen's father and older Pete's guidance counselor, in The Adventures of Pete and Pete. The following year, he starred as the eponymous character in the horror comedy film Ed and His Dead Mother (1993).

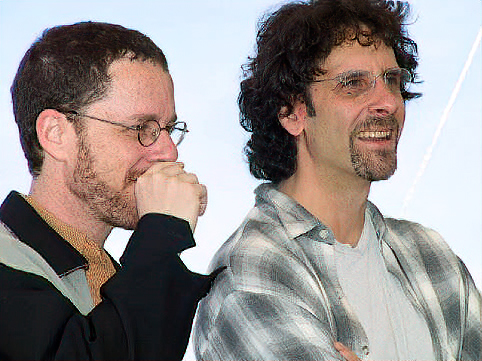
Throughout the late-1990s, Buscemi appeared in several films by the Coen Brothers (Joel and Ethan), seen in May 2001

He also appeared in a cameo appearance in Tarantino's next film, Pulp Fiction, where he portrays a waiter dressed as Buddy Holly who serves Mia Wallace and Vincent Vega. In 1994, he appeared in the 1994 comedy Airheads as Rex, bass player of The Lone Rangers. About the film, Buscemi said: "It was big for me because I think it was, like, one of the first studio films that I did where I had a significant part... this was a major role in a big film... I kinda liked it because Michael Lehmann was directing. He sort of had an independent film sensibility... I had so much fun making it and looking like that character, you know, with the long hair and tattoos." In 1995, Buscemi guest-starred as suspected murderer Gordon Pratt in "End Game", an episode of the television series Homicide: Life on the Street. Buscemi was rumored to be considered for the role of The Scarecrow in Joel Schumacher's proposed fifth installment of the first Batman franchise, Batman Unchained, before Warner Bros. cancelled the project. In 1995 he also starred alongside Tarantino and Antonio Banderas in Desperado, and played the lead role in the independent satire film Living in Oblivion.

The next year, Buscemi again collaborated with the Coen Brothers, starring as kidnapper Carl Showalter in the black comedy crime film Fargo starring Frances McDormand and William H. Macy. The film was a critical and commercial success debuting at the 1996 Cannes Film Festival where it competed for the Palme d'Or. Subsequently, he gained a reputation as character actor, with supporting roles in blockbuster action films: as Garland Greene in Simon West's Con Air (1997) and Rockhound in Michael Bay's Armageddon (1998). Buscemi also appeared as Donny in the Coen's cult classic black comedy film The Big Lebowski (1998) starring Jeff Bridges and John Goodman. Also in 1998 he played a supporting role in the romantic comedy The Wedding Singer starring Adam Sandler and Drew Barrymore. During this time he also made his directing debut the episode: "Finnegan's Wake" (1998) of the NBC drama Homicide: Life on the Street. From 1999 to 2001 he also directed two episodes of HBO prison drama Oz.

=== 1999–2008: The Sopranos ===
In 1999 he acted alongside Adam Sandler in the comedy Big Daddy (1999). Going into the 2000s, Buscemi continued to co-star in supporting roles. He played Seymour in the black comedy Ghost World (2001) opposite Scarlett Johansson and Thora Birch. The film received critical acclaim with critic Roger Ebert declaring, "The Buscemi role is one he's been pointing toward during his entire career". Buscemi received numerous nominations for his performance including for the Golden Globe Award for Best Supporting Actor – Motion Picture. In 2001 he voiced Randall Boggs in Pixar's animated film Monsters, Inc. (2001). The film was a critical and financial success. He also extensively performed voice-over work for animated films reprising the role of Randall in its prequel Monsters University (2013), Mr. Wesley in Home on the Range (2004), Nebbercracker in Monster House (2006) and Templeton the Rat in Charlotte's Web. During this time he also took the supporting role as Romero in the children's action adventure film Spy Kids 2: The Island of Lost Dreams (2002), as well as its sequel Spy Kids 3-D: Game Over (2003).

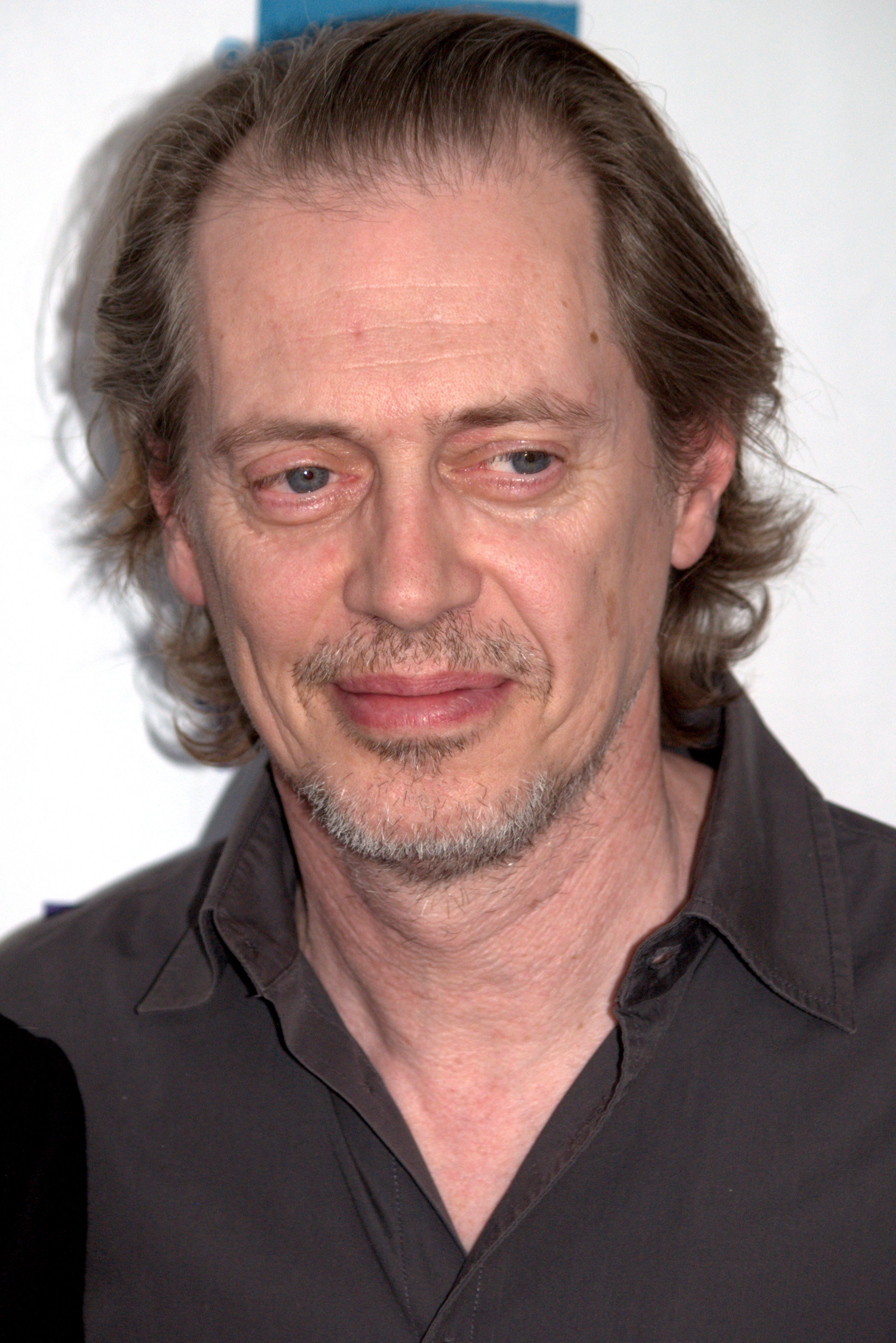
Buscemi at the 2009 Tribeca Film Festival

In 2004, Buscemi joined the cast of the acclaimed HBO crime television series The Sopranos as Tony Soprano's cousin and childhood friend, Tony Blundetto, a role that earned him an Emmy Award nomination. Buscemi had previously contributed to the show as director of the third-season episode "Pine Barrens", which was one of the most critically acclaimed episodes of the series, and the fourth-season episode "Everybody Hurts". He appeared in episode three of season 6 as a doorman in the afterlife, which is portrayed as a country club in Tony Soprano's dream. He also directed the episodes "In Camelot", the seventh episode of season 5, and "Mr. & Mrs. John Sacrimoni Request...", the fifth episode of season 6.

Buscemi appeared in the music video for Joe Strummer's cover version of Bob Marley's "Redemption Song". During this time Buscemi acted in several comedy films often starring Adam Sandler in films such as Mr. Deeds (2002), I Now Pronounce You Chuck & Larry (2007), Grown Ups (2010), and opposite Chris Rock I Think I Love My Wife (2007). He also starred in numerous critically acclaimed independent drama films such as the Tim Burton fantasy drama Big Fish (2003), the Jim Jarmusch film Coffee and Cigarettes (2003), the John Turturro romantic drama Romance & Cigarettes (2005), the anthology film Paris, je t'aime (2006), the war drama The Messenger (2009), and the romantic comedy Youth in Revolt (2009). He also directed the comedy drama films Lonesome Jim (2005), and Interview (2007), while also serving as an executive producer for the film Saint John of Las Vegas (2009). During this time he continued to voice roles in films such as Monster House (2006), Igor (2008), G-Force (2009), and Hotel Transylvania (2012).

=== 2009–2015: Boardwalk Empire ===
Buscemi continued directing for television including for the Showtime series Nurse Jackie (2009–2011) starring Edie Falco, the NBC sitcom 30 Rock (2009–2011) starring Tina Fey and Alec Baldwin and Portlandia from 2014 to 2015. He also directed 27 episodes of his web series Park Bench with Steve Buscemi (from 2014 to 2015).

Buscemi starred in the HBO drama series Boardwalk Empire created by Terence Winter. The series started in 2010, where Buscemi assumed the role of Enoch "Nucky" Thompson (based on Enoch L. Johnson), a corrupt Atlantic City politician who rules the town during the Prohibition era. Buscemi's performance garnered him a Golden Globe Award for Best Actor – Television Series Drama; he later received two more nominations for his work on the same show. In 2011 he hosted NBC's Saturday Night Live. Buscemi had a recurring role as Lenny Wosniak in the NBC sitcom 30 Rock from 2007 to 2013. During this time he appeared as a guest star in numerous shows such as the IFC sketch series Portlandia (2014–2017), the Comedy Central sketch series Inside Amy Schumer (2016), the Netflix comedy series Unbreakable Kimmy Schmidt (2016), and the Comedy Central comedy series Broad City (2017). He also acted alongside Adam Sandler in the animated film Hotel Transylvania 2 and The Ridiculous 6, (both in 2015).

He hosts, directs, and produces his own web series talk show, Park Bench with Steve Buscemi, which ran from 2014 to 2015. Buscemi won the Primetime Emmy Award for Outstanding Short Form Variety Series for the series in 2016. Also that year, Buscemi co-starred alongside Louis C.K. and Alan Alda in C.K.'s acclaimed comedy-drama web series Horace and Pete. In an interview with The Hollywood Reporter, Buscemi was the first actor to sign on to the project; with Boardwalk Empire over he was available to star in the series. The two reportedly "met up in New York City where C.K. pitched the still evolving series idea to Buscemi. He signed on, on the spot, to play C.K.'s brother, Pete".

=== 2016–present ===
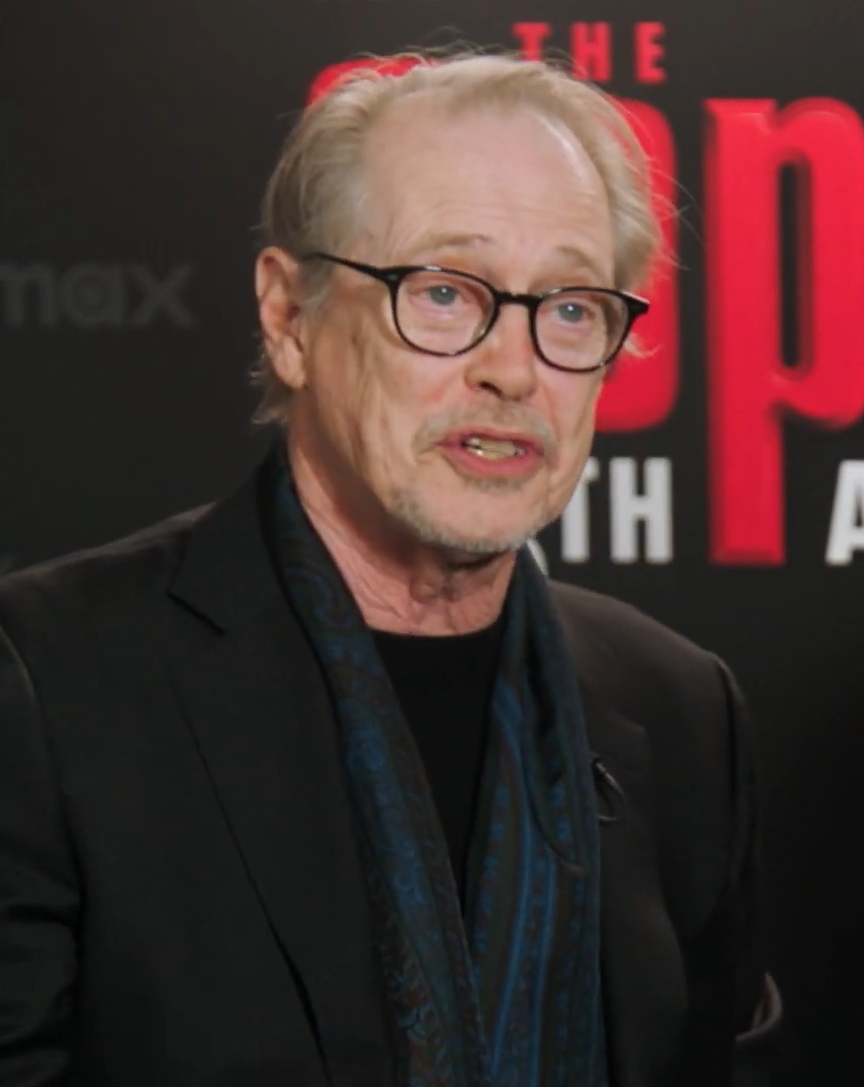
Buscemi in 2024

In 2016, Buscemi acted in the political drama Norman: The Moderate Rise and Tragic Fall of a New York Fixer starring Richard Gere. The film premiered at the Telluride Film Festival. The following year he starred as Del Montgomery in the British coming of age drama Lean on Pete (2017) directed by Andrew Haigh. The film premiered at the 74th Venice International Film Festival. The performance earned him a BIFA for Best Supporting Actor. In 2017 Buscemi starred in Armando Iannucci's dark comedy and satirical film The Death of Stalin. Buscemi portrayed Nikita Khrushchev. He received critical acclaim from critics with Manohla Dargis describing his performance as "superb". The role earned him a BIFA for Best Supporting Actor nomination.

During this time Buscemi continued taking roles in comedy films such as The Week Of (2018), The Dead Don't Die (2019), The King of Staten Island (2020), and Hubie Halloween (2020) as well as voicing roles in The Boss Baby (2017), Transformers: The Last Knight (2017), Hotel Transylvania 3: Summer Vacation (2018), and Hotel Transylvania: Transformania (2022).

In February 2020, Buscemi was cast as Chebutykin in a New York Theatre Workshop revival of Anton Chekhov's Three Sisters alongside Greta Gerwig, Oscar Isaac, and Chris Messina. The production was supposed to begin May 13, but was cancelled due to the COVID-19 pandemic with no return date set.

== Directing ==
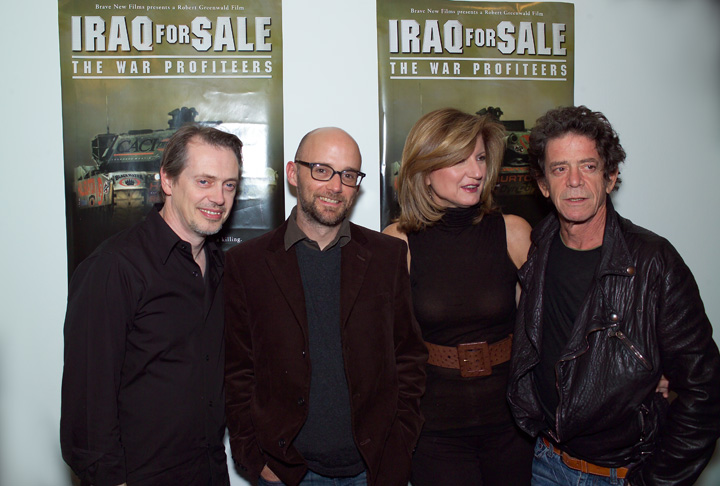
Buscemi and Lou Reed at a screening of the film Iraq for Sale: The War Profiteers in 2006

Buscemi has also worked as a director, making his directing debut in the 1990s. His directorial credits include:

- What Happened to Pete (1992) (short film)
- Trees Lounge (1996)
- Animal Factory (2000)
- Lonesome Jim (2005)
- Interview (2007)
- The Listener (2022)

In addition to feature films, he directed episodes of the television shows Love, Homicide: Life on the Street, The Sopranos, Oz, 30 Rock, Portlandia and Nurse Jackie. In the latter, his brother Michael played the character God in several episodes. While scouting a location for a film, Buscemi visited the Philadelphia Eastern State Penitentiary and found the building so interesting that he later provided the majority of the narration for the audio tour there.

== Reception and image ==
In an interview with The Hollywood Reporter, Buscemi was adamant about not altering his misaligned teeth, saying, "I've had dentists who have wanted to help me out, but I say, 'You know, I won't work again if you fix my teeth.'" Buscemi is noted for wrinkles around his eyes, giving him an aged appearance. "Buscemi eyes" describes the result when his eyes are photo-edited onto others' faces. He has stated that although he did not find this amusing, his wife Jo Andres did.

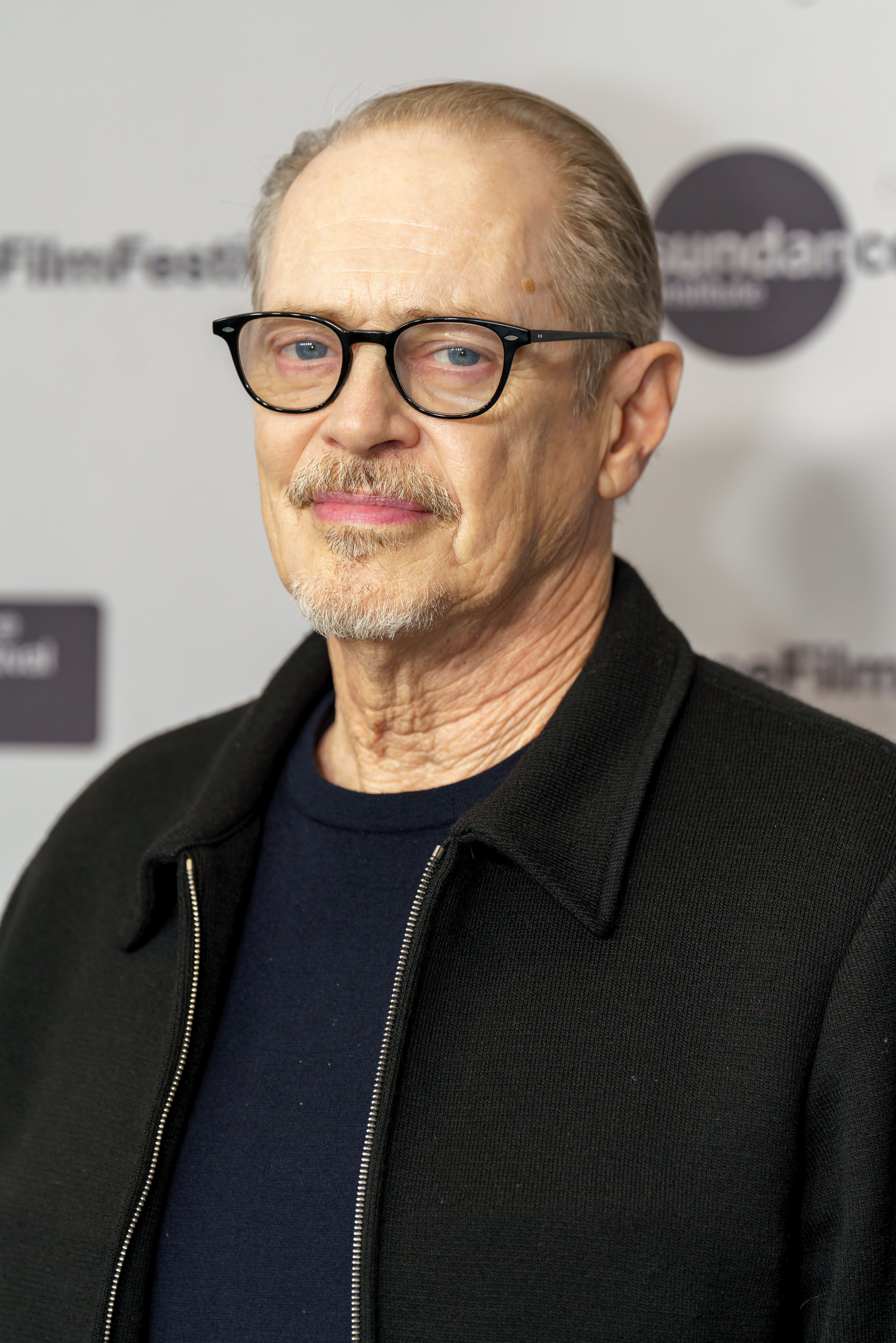
Sundance Premiere of "The Only Living Pickpocket in New York"

Buscemi had a recurring guest appearance in 30 Rock as a private investigator. Playing against his image, in the episode "The Tuxedo Begins", he appears during a flashback to be disguised as a teenager as he says that he was "part of a special task force of very young-looking cops who infiltrated high schools". His character's disguise and quote of "how do you do, fellow kids?" became an internet meme.

== Personal life ==
=== Marriage and interests ===
Buscemi grew up pronouncing his name as /buːˈsɛmi/ boo-SEH-mee, in an anglicized way. In Sicily, where his ancestors are from, it is pronounced as /buːˈʃɛmi/ boo-SHEH-mee. He once quipped, "I had to go to Sicily to find out I pronounce my name wrong."

Buscemi married Jo Andres in 1987; they were married until her death on January 6, 2019 of ovarian cancer. They had one son, Lucian Buscemi, born on June 30, 1990.

Buscemi is a fan of the musical group Beastie Boys. He appears in the music video for the band's 2011 song "Make Some Noise", which was nominated for MTV Video of the Year. He also has a post-credit scene in the Spike Jonze–directed documentary Beastie Boys Story in which he pokes fun at the commercial failure of the group's second studio album, Paul's Boutique; "When the tree fell in the forest, nobody heard that shit", jokes Buscemi. Buscemi sang in "The Broadway Song" for Lou Reed's 2003 album The Raven. Until 2025, Buscemi resided in Park Slope, Brooklyn, where he was given the key to the city in 2021. He previously resided in Sunset Strip, Los Angeles.

In early 2025, he married Karen Ho. The couple currently resides in Manhattan.

=== Injuries ===
Buscemi was stabbed multiple times in April 2001 at the Firebelly Lounge in Wilmington, North Carolina, while shooting the film Domestic Disturbance. He had intervened in a bar fight between Vince Vaughn, Scott Rosenberg, and two local men. He was discharged from the hospital after treatment.

On May 8, 2024, Buscemi was the victim of an unprovoked attack in Midtown Manhattan, when he was punched in the face. The 66-year-old was taken to a nearby hospital with bruising, swelling, and bleeding to his left eye. His publicist later said in a statement that Buscemi had recovered from the attack.

=== Firefighting ===
Buscemi was a firefighter from 1980 to 1984, with the New York City Fire Department's Engine Company No. 55, in Little Italy, Manhattan, while secretly taking acting classes and dabbling in stand-up on the side. The day after the September 11 attacks in New York, he returned to his old firehouse to volunteer; he worked 12-hour shifts for a week, digging through rubble to search for missing firefighters. On May 25, 2003, Buscemi was arrested with 19 other people while protesting the closing of a number of firehouses, including Engine 55. In the middle of 2011, Buscemi joined rallies against the threat of closing eight Brooklyn firehouses during the administration of Mayor Michael Bloomberg. He argued that closing these firehouses "is no way to protect New York."

In 2014, Buscemi was named honorary battalion chief by the New York City Fire Department after his early career serving as a fireman, and for his return to the service during 9/11. Also in 2014, Buscemi starred in and narrated the HBO documentary A Good Job: Stories of the FDNY, in which he revisited his work with fellow firefighters, sharing their stories, including those from September 11.

In 2021, Buscemi spoke to podcast host Marc Maron about his issues with PTSD, a consequence of the five days he spent volunteering in the aftermath of 9/11.

== Acting credits and accolades ==
Buscemi has an extensive body of work in both film and television, dating back to the 1980s. Buscemi has received numerous awards and nominations for his performances in film and television. This includes a Golden Globe Award for Best Supporting Actor – Motion Picture nomination for his performance in Ghost World (2001). He also received five Independent Spirit Award nominations, winning twice for Best Supporting Male for his roles in Reservoir Dogs (1992) and Ghost World (2001). For his role as Enoch 'Nucky' Thompson in the critically acclaimed HBO drama series Boardwalk Empire created by Terrence Winter, he received two Primetime Emmy Award nominations, three Golden Globe Award nominations, and ten Screen Actors Guild Award (SAG) nominations. He received a Golden Globe Award for Best Actor – Television Series Drama in 2011, and four SAG awards, two consecutive Outstanding Actor in a Drama Series awards (2011, 2012), and two consecutive Outstanding Ensemble in a Comedy Series (2011, 2012). Buscemi won a Primetime Emmy Award for Outstanding Short Form Variety Series for Park Bench with Steve Buscemi (2016).
