= Jim Jarmusch filmography =

Independent film maker

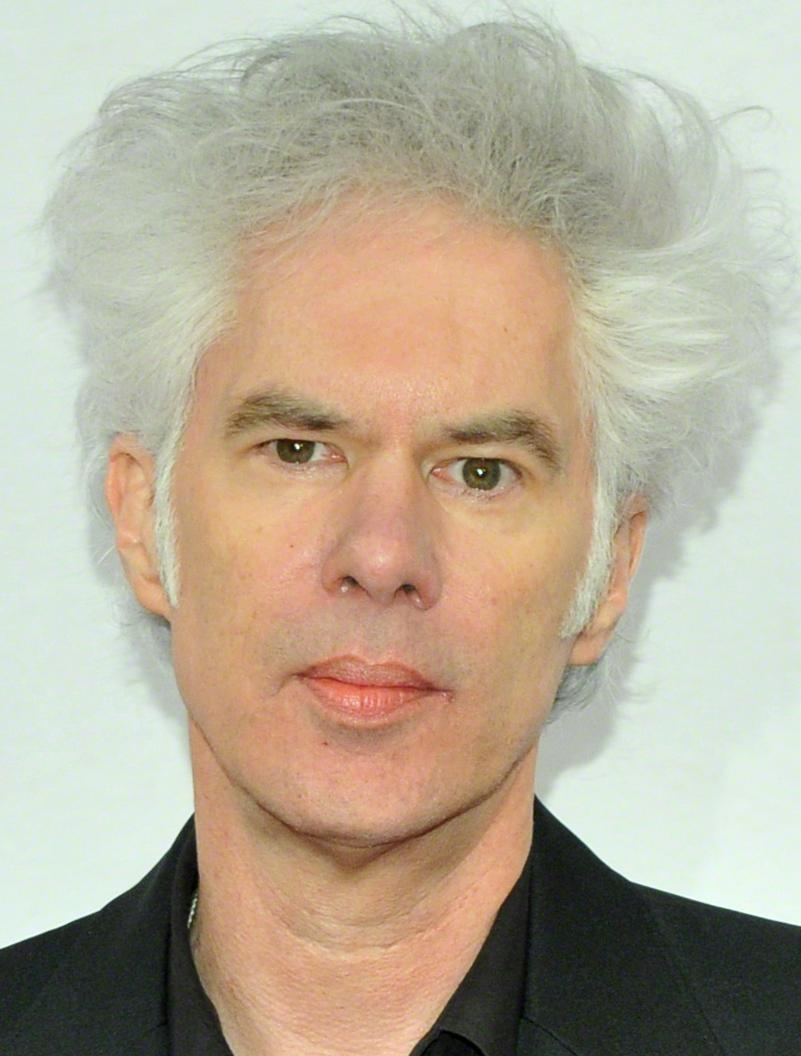
Jarmusch in 2013

Jim Jarmusch is an American independent filmmaker and screenwriter. His filmography includes fourteen feature films, two documentaries, six music videos, and four short films. In addition, Jarmusch has worked on several other films and has appeared on screen on multiple occasions as an actor and as himself.

== Films as director ==
=== Feature films ===
Year	Name	Director	Writer	Producer	Composer	Editor
1980	Permanent Vacation	Yes	Yes	Yes	Yes	Yes
1984	Stranger Than Paradise	Yes	Yes	No	No	Yes
1986	Down by Law	Yes	Yes	No	No	No
1989	Mystery Train	Yes	Yes	No	No	No
1991	Night on Earth	Yes	Yes	Yes	No	No
1995	Dead Man	Yes	Yes	No	No	No
1999	Ghost Dog: The Way of the Samurai	Yes	Yes	Yes	No	No
2003	Coffee and Cigarettes	Yes	Yes	Yes	Yes	Yes
2005	Broken Flowers	Yes	Yes	No	No	No
2009	The Limits of Control	Yes	Yes	No	No	No
2013	Only Lovers Left Alive	Yes	Yes	No	No	No
2016	Paterson	Yes	Yes	No	No	No
2019	The Dead Don't Die	Yes	Yes	No	No	No
2025	Father Mother Sister Brother	Yes	Yes	executive	Yes	No

=== Documentary films ===
Year	Name	Notes
1997	Year of the Horse	Follows the 1996 tour of Neil Young and Crazy Horse; Jarmusch also functioned as the documentary's cinematographer
2016	Gimme Danger	The Stooges documentary

=== Music videos ===
Year	Name	Artist	Notes
1986	"The Lady Don't Mind"	Talking Heads	
1987	"Sightsee M.C!"	Big Audio Dynamite	
1990	"It's All Right with Me"	Tom Waits	Shown as a segment of the television series Red, Hot & Blue in 1990
1992	"I Don't Wanna Grow Up"	Tom Waits	
1995	"Dead Man Theme"	Neil Young	
2006	"Steady as She Goes"	The Raconteurs	

=== Short films ===
Year	Name	Notes
1986	Coffee and Cigarettes: Strange to Meet You	Commissioned as a Saturday Night Live sketch; incorporated as one of the vignettes in Jarmusch's 2003 feature Coffee and Cigarettes
1989	Coffee and Cigarettes: Memphis Version	
1993	Coffee and Cigarettes: Somewhere in California	
2002	Ten Minutes Older: The Trumpet	"Int. Trailer Night" segment
2021	French Water	Collaboration with Womanry

== Screen appearances ==
=== Acting credits ===
Year	Film	Role
1984	American Autobahn	Movie producer
1987	Straight to Hell	Amos Dade
1987	Helsinki Napoli All Night Long	Barkeeper #2
1988	Candy Mountain	
1989	Leningrad Cowboys Go America	New York car dealer
1990	The Golden Boat	Stranger
1992	In the Soup	Monty
1995	Iron Horsemen	Silver Rider
1995	Blue in the Face	Bob
1996	Cannes Man	Cameo appearance
1996	Sling Blade	Frostee Cream guy

=== Appearances as himself ===
Year	Name	Medium	Notes
1983	Fräulein Berlin	Feature film	
1991	Fishing with John	TV series	Jarmusch appears in "Episode 1: Montauk with Jim Jarmusch" in which he and star John Lurie hunt shark
1994	Tigrero: A Film That Was Never Made	Documentary	
1995	American Cinema	TV series	
1996	The Typewriter, the Rifle & the Movie Camera	Documentary	
1997	R.I.P. – Rest in Pieces: A Portrait of Joe Coleman	Documentary	
1997	We're Outta Here!	Video	Alternate title: The Ramones
1997	Year of the Horse	Documentary	Follows the band Neil Young and Crazy Horse on tour
1998	Pop Odyssee 2 - House of the Rising Punk	TV	
1998	Divine Trash	Documentary	
1998	Space Ghost Coast to Coast	TV	
1998	Lee Marvin: A Personal Portrait by John Boorman	TV special	
1999	In Bad Taste: The John Waters Story	TV special	Jarmusch is an interviewee
2001	SpongeBob SquarePants	TV series	Archival footage from Fishing With John (episode: "Hooky")
2001	Screamin' Jay Hawkins: I Put a Spell on Me	Documentary	
2001	V.I.P.	TV series	
2002	¿Quién es Alejandro Chomski?	Documentary	
2002	Focus on Jim Jarmusch	TV	
2003	Chaplin Today: A King in New York	TV documentary	
2003	Hollywood High	TV documentary	
2003	Rockets Redglare!	Documentary	
2004	Z Channel: A Magnificent Obsession	TV documentary	
2005	Cinema Mil	TV	
2005	Excavating Taylor Mead	Documentary	
2005	Punk: Attitude	TV documentary	
2005	Magacine 2005	TV	
2008	Joe Strummer: The Future Is Unwritten	Documentary	Chronicles the life of The Clash frontman Joe Strummer, who starred in Jarmusch's Mystery Train (1989)
2008	The Simpsons	TV	Episode "Any Given Sundance"
2008	40X15: Forty Years of the Directors' Fortnight	Documentary	Focuses on the Directors' Fortnight of the Cannes Film Festival
2009	Blank City	Documentary	Covers the New York City underground film movement
2009	Bored to Death	TV series	"The Case of the Missing Screenplay" episode 3
2014	Song from the Forest	Documentary	Friend of Louis Sarno
2019	The Raconteurs: Live at Electric Lady	Concert Documentary	Interviews the Raconteurs
2022	What We Do in the Shadows	TV show	Himself

== Other production credits ==
Year	Name	Credit
1980	Lightning Over Water	Observer
1980	Underground U.S.A.	Sound recordist
1981	You Are Not I	Producer/cinematographer
1982	The State of Things	Composer
1983	Burroughs	Sound recordist
1986	Sleepwalk	Camera operator/cinematographer
1993	When Pigs Fly	Executive producer
1994	Clerks	Special thanks
2005	Wu-Tang Meets the Indie Culture	Featured rapper
2005	Enron: The Smartest Guys in the Room	Special thanks
2008	Explicit Ills	Executive producer
2015	Uncle Howard	Executive producer
2016	Porto	Executive producer

== Bibliography ==
- Hertzberg, Ludvig (2001). "Filmography". Jim Jarmusch: Interviews. Jackson: University Press of Mississippi. pp. xiii–xvii. ISBN 1-57806-379-5.
- "Jim Jarmusch > Filmography – AllMovie". allmovie. All Media Guide.
- "Jim Jarmusch – Trailer – Showtimes – Cast – Movies & TV – NYTimes.com". Movies & TV Dept. The New York Times. 2008. Archived from the original on June 16, 2008.
- "Jim Jarmusch – Rotten Tomatoes Celebrity Profile". Rotten Tomatoes. IGN.
- "Jim Jarmusch Filmography – Yahoo! Movies". Yahoo! Movies. Yahoo!.
- "Jim Jarmusch's Upcoming Vampire Film 'Only Lovers Left Alive'". The Hollywood Reporter. January 1, 2012.
