= A Distant Episode =

- Short story by Paul Bowles
- Country: United States
- Language: English

Publication
- Published in: The Partisan Review
- Publication date: January–February 1947

"A Distant Episode" is a short story by Paul Bowles. Written in 1945, it was first published in the Partisan Review (January–February 1947) and republished in New Directions in Prose and Poetry, #10 in 1948. It is also the title piece in a 1988 collection of Bowles's short stories, A Distant Episode: Selected Stories by Ecco Press.

"A Distant Episode" is widely regarded as one of Bowles's finest stories and "a true masterpiece of short fiction".

== Plot ==
"Paul Bowles's obsessive subject is the tragic, even fatal mistakes that Westerners so commonly make in their misguided and often presumptuous encounters with the mysteries of a foreign culture...'A Distant Episode' is a cautionary tale of the horrors that can ensue when a stranger in a foreign land knows too little--and assumes too much."—Literary critic Francine Prose in Harper's Magazine.

The protagonist of the story, a professor of linguistic anthropology, is traveling in southern Morocco to the remote village of Aïn Tadouirt (a purely fictional location). He is fluent in the local dialects of Maghrebis. A largely sentimental journey, the professor seeks to rekindle a friendship he had enjoyed with a café proprietor ten years earlier, Hassan Ramani. To his dismay, he discovers that Ramani has passed away. The qaouaji who now runs the establishment spurns the professor's gratuitous and insulting efforts to enlist him in obtaining souvenir camel-udder boxes. The professor ignores the qaouaji's undisguised hostility and arrangements are made to visit a source for the artifacts. Under cover of darkness, the qaouaji leads the professor into a local quarry, occupied by the nomadic and outcast Reguibat and abandons him there. The professor is instantly set upon by the tribe's dogs and violently taken prisoner by the Reguibat. When he attempts to speak to his captors in a Moghrebi dialect, they instantly sever his tongue. Traumatized, he descends into lunacy and is trained by his Reguibat masters to perform as a dancing clown. After a year of traveling with the tribe, he is sold to a member of the Ouled Nail tribe. As the Professor's self-awareness begins to reemerge, he refuses to dance for his new master. Believing he is cheated, the villager murders a Reguiba for revenge, and is arrested by French authorities, leaving the professor unguarded in his house. The professor escapes from his confinement in the house and flees into the desert.

== Publishing history ==
Bowles was primarily known as a modernist composer when he took up writing short fiction at the age of 35. His story "The Scorpion" was favorably received in 1945. His next effort, "A Distant Episode", was completed the same year, and, according to critic Gore Vidal, Bowles "now possessed the art to depict his dreams".

"A Distant Episode" was written while Bowles was residing in New York City, and was first published in the January 1947 issue of Partisan Review. The story was included in The Best Short Stories of 1948, before it appeared in Random House's collection The Delicate Prey and Other Stories in 1950.

== Critical assessment ==
"A Distant Episode", as well as "The Delicate Prey" and "Pages from Cold Point", the latter each written in 1949, were published in The Delicate Prey and Other Stories in 1950. These "disturbing" and "notorious" works elicited both controversy and admiration in the literary world.

Literary critic Francine Prose remarks that "A Distant Episode" is "arguably his best, certainly his most famous and most frequently anthologized story..." Playwright Tennessee Williams described "A Distant Episode" as "a true masterpiece of short fiction".

== Theme ==
"Shock is a sine qua non to the story. You don't teach a thing like that unless you are able, in some way, to make the reader understand what the situation would be like to him. And that involves shock."—Paul Bowles on "A Distant Episode" in a 1971 interview with Oliver Evans in the Mediterranean Review

The chief thematic element in "A Distant Episode" is the surrender to fate, as his character, the Professor, descends into a foreign and primitive domain. Biographer Allen Hibbard writes:

In the world according to Bowles, human will is not ultimately in control. Bowles's characters, in fact, exercise remarkably little willpower. Rather than shaping their own lives, larger, unpredictable external forces determine the patterns their lives take."

Contrary to this interpretation, literary critic Francine Prose argues that a trace of will is detectable in the Professor's "simultaneously innocent and arrogant cultural mistakes and miscalculations".:

A casual reading [of "A Distant Episode"] suggests that the Professor's misfortune is accidental, a matter of longitude and latitude, of being in the wrong place at the wrong time—or at any time, for that matter. When you foolishly stray beyond the borders of civilization ... Well, what did he expect? And in fact that's most commonly how the story is interpreted and discussed. Yet upon closer examination, the Professor turns out to be not entirely innocent and is in fact vaguely responsible for his regrettable fate..."

Paul Bowles, in an interview, offered this laconic reference to theme in "A Distant Episode":

I wanted to tell what the desert can do to us. That was all. The desert is the protagonist.

== Film adaptation ==
In 2015 "A Distant Episode" was adapted into film by Ben Rivers under the title The Sky Trembles and the Earth Is Afraid and the Two Eyes Are Not Brothers. River's film merges documentary (the first part of the film is a making of Mimosas, the film Oliver Laxe was filming in Morocco at the time) with fiction (the adaptation of Bowles' story, with Oliver Laxe as protagonist).

== Sources ==
- Hibbard, Allen. 1993. Paul Bowles: A Study of the Short Fiction. Twayne Publishers. New York. ISBN 0-8057-8318-0
- Prose, Francine."The Coldest Eye: acting badly among the Arabs". Harper's Magazine. March 2002. Retrieved July 10, 2022.
- Tóibín, Colm. "Avoid the Orient". Review of Paul Bowles: A Life, by Virginia Spencer Carr. London Review of Books, Vol. 29 No. 1, January 4, 2007. Retrieved July 11, 2022.
- Vidal, Gore. 1979. Introduction to Paul Bowles; Collected Stories, 1939-1976. Black Sparrow Press. Santa Rosa. 2001. ISBN 0-87685-396-3
