= At Paso Rojo =

Short story by Paul Bowles

- Short story by Paul Bowles
- Country: United States
- Language: English

Publication
- Published in: Mademoiselle
- Publication date: September 1948

"At Paso Rojo" is a short story by Paul Bowles, written in 1947 and first published in the September 1948 issue of Mademoiselle magazine. It later appeared in a collection of his short fiction, The Delicate Prey and Other Stories (1950), published by Random House.

== Plot ==
The story is set in Costa Rica at a fictional cattle ranch, Paso Rojo, closely resembling one that Bowles had visited in Guanacaste Province. The point-of-view is in the omniscient third-person.

Two well-to-do and unmarried sisters, Lucha and Chalia, visit their younger brother Don Frederico, a prosperous rancher, in the countryside shortly after their mother's funeral. Don Frederico has embraced his role as benevolent patriarch of Pasa Rojo [Translation], and developed a genuine appreciation for the character of the peasants who live and work on his estate. He has no interest in returning to the upper-class social life in which he was reared. Lucha expresses disapproval at his lifestyle, and considers her peasant servants "animals with speech." Don Frederico gently chides her: "They are good people" and remarks that their sister, Chalia "has changed." Lucha dumurs, assuring him that their younger sister "has always been crazy." Chalia has defiantly refused to wear mourning attire, and is dressed casually as an equestrian. Her makeup is meretricious. She chastens Don Frederico for being overly generous to his workers, and warns him that they are naturally thieves. Her brother responds emphatically: "No one here has ever stolen anything from me" and walks out.

Chalia accompanies Don Frederico and his ranch hands on a tour of the estate. A young cowboy, Roberto, remains with her when her horse falls behind. She begins to flirt with the boy, and insists on dismounting under a tree. She initiates a seduction, and Roberto, apprehensive and shy, misapprehends her efforts to remove his clothing. He stands up and accidentally shoves her away. His innocent response "changed her mood instantly." Believing herself scorned, she leaps on her horse and gallops recklessly into the forest in hopes of ending her life. She arrives back at the ranch unscathed.

That evening, emboldened by the older woman's attempted seduction, Roberto disrobes and bathes in the creek within sight of Chalia's bedroom window. His audacity outrages her and "the idea of vengeance upon the boy filled her with a delicious excitement."

She purloins a handful of banknotes from Don Frederico's office. During a dance that evening, Roberto lurks nearby in the darkness, and Chalis approaches him. He has been drinking rum. She caresses the boy and presents the bank notes to him: "Roberto, I love you. I have a present for you" and places these in his hand and departs. Before daylight, Chalia dresses and goes in search of Roberto; she discovers him passed out in the dark along the road. She pushes the boy's senseless body into a shallow ravine.

The next morning Don Frederico discovers the missing funds. Roberto, bruised and hungover, tells him that he received the money from Chalia. When Don Frederico questions his sister, she says she only gave Roberto a single centavo, and disingenuously calls for leniency. Don Frederico feels compelled to immediately dismiss Roberto. The boy departs Paso Rojo. though he is allowed to keep the money.

Chalis secretly revels in the success of her scheme, in particular the disillusionment that her brother has suffered concerning his idealized view of the peasants.

== Publication history ==
"At Paso Rojos" was written in 1947 while Bowles was at Ocho Rios, Jamaica., but the setting is based on Bowles's "precise description" of a ranch in Guanacaste Province, Costa Rica, that he visited in 1938 during his honeymoon with spouse and author Jane Bowles.

The story was first published in the collection of Bowles's short fiction The Delicate Prey and Other Stories in 1950.

== Critical assessment ==
One measure of the high regard that Random House held for "Paso Rojo" is its placement as the first of the 17 stories published in The Delicate Prey and Other Stories (1950). Literary critic Allen Hibbard compares the story favorably to "Marie Concepcion" by Katherine Ann Porter. He writes: "The psychological dynamics of the story are taut, and as often the case in good stories, we are never given full explanations for why characters act the way they do. We simply see them acting…"

Novelist and critic Gore Vidal offers this praise for "Paso Rojo":

Bowles notes the sadism that sexual frustration can cause in "At Paso Rojo". But where the ordinary writer would leave it at that, Bowles goes deeper into the human case and, paradoxically, he achieves his greatest effect when he concentrates entirely on surfaces. Although he seldom describes a human face, he examines landscapes with the precision of a geologist…He records weather with all the solemnity of a meteorologist. As for his human characters, he simply lets them reveal themselves through what they say or do not say.

== Sources ==
- Hibbard, Allen. 1993. Paul Bowles: A Study of the Short Fiction. Twayne Publishers. New York. ISBN 0-8057-8318-0
- Prose, Francine. 2002. The Coldest Eye: acting badly among the Arabs. Harper's Magazine. March 2002. https://harpers.org/archive/2002/03/the-coldest-eye/ Retrieved July 10, 2022.
- Pulsifer, Gary. 1999. Much-traveled American writer and composer who made his home in Morocco, the setting for his best-known novel, The Sheltering Sky. The Guardian. November 19, 1999. https://www.theguardian.com/books/1999/nov/19/news.obituaries Retrieved July 26, 2022.
- Tóibín, Colm. 2007. Avoid the Orient. Review, Paul Bowles: A Life, by Virginia Spencer Carr. London Review of Books, Vol. 29 No. 1, January 4, 2007. https://www.lrb.co.uk/the-paper/v29/n01/colm-toibin/avoid-the-orient Retrieved July 11, 2022.
- Vidal, Gore. 1979. Introduction to Paul Bowles; Collected Stories, 1939-1976. Black Sparrow Press. Santa Rosa. 2001. ISBN 0876853963
