= You Are Not I (short story) =

- Short story by Paul Bowles
- Country: United States
- Language: English

Publication
- Published in: Mademoiselle
- Publication date: January 1948

"You Are Not I" is a short story by Paul Bowles written in 1948 and first published in the January 1948 issue of Mademoiselle magazine. It later appeared in the collection of his short fiction, The Delicate Prey and Other Stories (1950), published by Random House.

The story is one Bowles's tale of "transference", in which the madwoman who narrates the story believes she has occupied the body and mind of her sane sister.

== Plot ==
"You Are Not I" is told in the first-person, by a narrator identified as Ethel.

The story opens minutes after a catastrophic train derailment. The disaster has occurred within sight of a mental institute. In the confusion, Ethel, an inmate of the asylum, walks off the gated property without being detected by the staff. She wanders about the wreckage, observing the dead and injured passengers thrown from the carriages, but with utter detachment. A number of corpses have been assembled in a row. Ethel collects small, smooth stones from the embankment, and compulsively inserts one into each of the mouths of the dead. When she attempts to remove jewelry from the hand of a woman buried in the wreckage, she is accosted by a train employee. Weeping, Ethel claims that the woman is her dead sister. She is led to an assembly area for survivors. She is assumed to be suffering from shock after an examination at the local hospital.

She tells the authorities the address of her sister who lives nearby, and is driven there. When she arrives, her sister greets her arrival with dismay. Unlike the medics, she knows that Ethel was never on the train and suffers from severe mental illness, not shock. She objects to having Ethel in her household. She calls the asylum and arranges to have Ethel recommitted. Ethel then becomes convinced that she has assumed the body and mind of her sister. When she arrives at the institution, she writes the narrative that constitutes the story, believing that she now occupies her sister's home, and that she has exchanged existences with her sibling. Ethel believes her sister is now confirmed in the mental ward and "I am still in my living room, sitting on the divan."

== Publication history ==
In a 1974 interview with Lawrence Stewart, Bowles explained that the concept for "You Are Not I" arose from a dream. He rose in the night and sketched the outline, as well as a number of details, on a notepad in the dark.

The whole atmosphere of the beginning I had dreamed. So when I woke up I began writing, without putting the light on, in the dark - long dash I could barely read it the next day. I just wrote, large, and turned the pages and kept this up, because I was saying it from memory, almost. Down as far a putting the stones in the mouths [of the deceased]..."

== Style ==
Bowles's first-person narrative, "an exploration of a neurotic human consciousness" is delivered by an inmate of a mental institution. On the similarity of this story to the works of Edgar Allan Poe, Bowles biographer Allen Hibbard writes:

In "You Are Not I" the screw is given one more turn. Here we are in the hands of an insane, schizophrenic narrator….Ethyl is telling the story (the entire story) in which she tells another story (the 'will power" reversal) in which the [sane] sister becomes the author of a story in which Ethyl is the character... The intensely subjective, deranged first-person narrative reminds one of Poe's narrators in "The Cask of Amontillado" or "The Man of the Crowd".

== Film adaptation ==
In 1981, a film adaptation of the same name was directed by Sara Driver in her directorial debut, It is a short subject film based on Bowles's story and co-written by Jim Jarmusch. Shot in six days on a $12,000 budget, it developed a following soon after a well-received premiere at the Public Theater, only to be pulled out of circulation when a warehouse fire destroyed the film's negative. Rarely seen, it was still championed by renowned critics and film journals like Jonathan Rosenbaum and Cahiers du Cinéma, which hailed You Are Not I as one of the best films of the 1980s. Considered 'lost' for many years, a print was later discovered among Bowles's belongings. Driver was awarded a preservation grant from Women in Film and Television. The restored film screened in the Master Works section of the 2011 New York Film Festival.

== Sources ==
- Hibbard, Allen. 1993. Paul Bowles: A Study of the Short Fiction. Twayne Publishers. New York. ISBN 0-8057-8318-0
- Prose, Francine. 2002. The Coldest Eye: acting badly among the Arabs. Harper's Magazine. March 2002. https://harpers.org/archive/2002/03/the-coldest-eye/ Retrieved July 10, 2022.
- Tóibín, Colm. 2007. Avoid the Orient. Review, Paul Bowles: A Life, by Virginia Spencer Carr. London Review of Books, Vol. 29 No. 1, January 4, 2007. https://www.lrb.co.uk/the-paper/v29/n01/colm-toibin/avoid-the-orient Retrieved July 11, 2022.
- Vidal, Gore. 1979. Introduction to Paul Bowles; Collected Stories, 1939-1976. Black Sparrow Press. Santa Rosa. 2001. ISBN 0876853963
