= Boom for Real: The Late Teenage Years of Jean-Michel Basquiat =

2017 American documentary film

- Film poster
- Directed by: Sara Driver
- Produced by: Rachel Dengiz; Sara Driver
- Starring: Jean-Michel Basquiat; Alexis Adler; Felice Rosser; Lee Quiñones; Carlo McCormick; Fab 5 Freddy; Al Diaz; Michael Holman; Coleen Fitzgibbon; Glenn O'Brien
- Cinematography: Adam Benn
- Edited by: Adam Kurnitz
- Production company: Hells Kitten Productions
- Distributed by: Magnolia Pictures
- Release dates: September 8, 2017 (Toronto); May 11, 2018 (United States)
- Running time: 78 minutes
- Country: United States
- Language: English
- Box office: $193,520

Boom for Real: The Late Teenage Years of Jean-Michel Basquiat is a 2017 American documentary film directed by Sara Driver. It tells the story about Jean-Michel Basquiat and the New York City art scene in the late 1970s. The film had its premiere at the 2017 Toronto International Film Festival on September 8, 2017. It was released in the United States on May 11, 2018.

== Cast ==
- Jean-Michel Basquiat
- Alexis Adler
- Felice Rosser
- Lee Quiñones
- Carlo McCormick
- Fab 5 Freddy
- Al Diaz
- Michael Holman
- Coleen Fitzgibbon
- Glenn O'Brien
- Diego Cortez
- Patricia Field
- jennifer jazz
- Jim Jarmusch
- Bud Kliment
- Mary-Ann Monforton
- James Nares
- Lucy Sante
- Kenny Scharf
- Sur Rodney (Sur)

== Production ==
The idea for the film originally came from The New School's panel discussion about Jean-Michel Basquiat's early life. About a month or two later, Hurricane Sandy hit New York City. A scientist Alexis Adler, who is Sara Driver's friend and lived with Basquiat, had put Basquiat's drawings and writings in a bank vault. She went to the bank and found them safe. In a 2018 interview with Interview, Driver recalled, "I saw what she had and I was like, this is not only a window into him, but this is a window into New York at that particular moment in time." For example, the film contains extensive coverage of Colab, The Real Estate Show, The Times Square Show and ABC No Rio through on-camera interviews with once Colab president Coleen Fitzgibbon and art critic Carlo McCormick.

== Release ==
The film had its premiere at the 2017 Toronto International Film Festival on September 8, 2017. Subsequently, Magnolia Pictures acquired the North American rights to the film. It was released in the United States on May 11, 2018.

== Reception ==
On review aggregator website Rotten Tomatoes, the film holds an approval rating of 89% based on 47 reviews, with an average rating of 6.7/10. The website's critical consensus reads, "Boom for Real: The Late Teenage Years of Jean-Michel Basquiat offers an insightful look into a key period of the artist's life, his peers and influences, and the early '80s art world." On Metacritic, the film has a weighted average score of 72 out of 100, based on 12 critics, indicating "generally favorable" reviews.

Wendy Ide of The Observer gave the film 4 out of 5 stars and commented that "Boom for Real is as much an account of a specific, thrillingly gritty period in New York's art history as it is a portrait of the young Basquiat." John DeFore of The Hollywood Reporter wrote, "Fame, money and addiction are a world away from Boom for Real, a movie that understands how, even for an artist with more ambition and more willingness to play the game than most of his peers, creativity can still be its own reward." Owen Gleiberman of Variety called the film "compact but highly resonant". Matt Fagerholm of RogerEbert.com gave the film 2.5 out of 4 stars, writing, "Driver is a fascinating and crucial artist in her own right, and I'd love to see her make more movies."
