= You Are Not I =

You Are Not I may refer to:

- You Are Not I (short story), 1948 short story by Paul Bowles
- You Are Not I (film), 1981 American film, based on Bowles's short story
