= The Delicate Prey and Other Stories =

1950 short story compilation by Paul Bowles

- First edition
- Author: Paul Bowles
- Language: English
- Publisher: Random House (US)
- Publication date: 1950
- Publication place: United States
- Media type: Print (hardback & paperback)
- Pages: 307 pp
- ISBN: 0-88001-263-3

The Delicate Prey and Other Stories is a collection of 17 works of short fiction by Paul Bowles, published in 1950 by Random House.

Typical of Bowles's oeuvre, the majority of the stories in this volume are set in Latin America and North Africa. Only two are set in the United States.

Bowles, at the time of its publication, was known primarily for his work as an American modernist composer. The Delicate Prey and Other Stories established him as a notable literary talent. The stories published in this collection include a number of chef-d'oeuvres, including "A Distant Episode", "Pages from Cold Point" and "The Delicate Prey".

== Stories ==
- at paso rojo
- pastor dowe at tacaté
- call at corazon
- under the sky
- señor ong and señor ha
- the circular valley
- the echo
- the scorpion
- the fourth day out from santa cruz
- pages from cold point
- you are not i
- how many midnights
- a thousand days to mokhatar
- tea on the mountain
- by the water
- delicate prey
- a distant episode

== Theme and style ==
"What is immediately striking--and particularly characteristic of Bowles's fiction--is the distanced, clinical, quietly confident, and authoritative tone; the rigorously unadorned, quasi-journalistic prose style; the sleek, controlled elegance of his sentences…Bowles's approach to his material and to his characters is relentlessly anthropological, unbiased by either contempt and derision on the one hand or by sympathy and affection on the other…"—Francine Prose, in Harper's Magazine (2002)

"In the stories of The Delicate Prey, 1950, the medium's limitation seems to enhance the basic virtue of Bowles, his tight control of savage and baleful situations, and to foreshorten his main weakness, the inability to conceive and develop characters dramatically."—Ihab Hassan in The Pilgrim as Prey: A Note on Paul Bowles (1954)

One of the unifying features of the stories in this collection are their settings: many of them occur in regions foreign to most Americans, including North Africa and Latin America. From these settings arise Bowles's "thematic concerns." Author Gore Vidal notes that "Landscape is all-important in a Bowles story" and Bowles himself remarked: "It seems a practical procedure to let the place determine the characters who will inhabit it." The characters are impelled towards alien and strange territory, both physically and psychologically, challenging their Western cultural assumptions.

Bowles's "unmistakably modern" thematic concerns" are demonstrated by his "depiction of violence and terror." The violent episodes that appear in the stories of this collection have been widely remarked upon, as well as the style in which they are rendered. Literary critic Allen Hibbard, though recognizing the "thoroughly pessimistic" themes, traces Bowles's literary style to that of 19th Century authors, such as Flaubert, Turgenev and James:

Transgressive acts, as shocking as they may be, are contained within traditionally crafted forms. Generally, the Bowles' story is told in a fairly straightforward, linear manner [which] supports no moral comment on the actions that take place.

Bowles, commenting on his own style: "I don't try to analyze the emotions of any of my characters. I don't give them emotions. You can explain a thought but not an emotion. You can't use emotions. There's nothing you can do with them."

Literary critic Francine Prose observes:

Bowles's fiction is the last place to which one would go for hope, or even for faint reassurance that the world is anything but a senseless horror show…It would be hard to think of another writer so unmoved and uninterested in the traditional values and virtues that we associate with Western humanism (compassion, generosity, empathy), just as it's difficult to find one genuinely heroic character or act of heroism, selflessness, or sacrifice in Bowles's oeuvre.

== Sources ==
- Hibbard, Allen. 1993. Paul Bowles: A Study of the Short Fiction. Twayne Publishers. New York. ISBN 0-8057-8318-0
- Prose, Francine. 2002. The Coldest Eye: acting badly among the Arabs. Harper's Magazine. March 2002. https://harpers.org/archive/2002/03/the-coldest-eye/ Retrieved July 10, 2022.
- Tóibín, Colm. 2007. Avoid the Orient. Review, of Paul Bowles: A Life, by Virginia Spencer Carr. London Review of Books, Vol. 29 No. 1, January 4, 2007. https://www.lrb.co.uk/the-paper/v29/n01/colm-toibin/avoid-the-orient Retrieved July 11, 2022.
- Vidal, Gore. 1979. Introduction to Paul Bowles; Collected Stories, 1939-1976. Black Sparrow Press. Santa Rosa. 2001. ISBN 0-87685-396-3
