= Mystery Train (film) =

1989 film by Jim Jarmusch

- Theatrical release poster
- Directed by: Jim Jarmusch
- Written by: Jim Jarmusch
- Produced by: Jim Stark
- Starring: Youki Kudoh; Masatoshi Nagase; Screamin' Jay Hawkins; Cinqué Lee; Nicoletta Braschi; Elizabeth Bracco; Joe Strummer; Rick Aviles; Steve Buscemi; Vondie Curtis-Hall
- Cinematography: Robby Müller
- Edited by: Melody London
- Music by: John Lurie
- Production companies: Mystery Train Inc.; Victor Company of Japan; MTI Home Video
- Distributed by: Orion Classics (United States)
- Release dates: May 13, 1989 (Cannes); November 17, 1989 (United States); December 23, 1989 (Japan)
- Running time: 113 minutes
- Countries: United States; Japan
- Languages: English; Japanese; Italian
- Budget: $2.8 million
- Box office: $1.5 million (domestic)

Mystery Train is a 1989 comedy-drama anthology film written and directed by Jim Jarmusch and set in Memphis, Tennessee. A co-production between the United States and Japan, the film is a triptych of stories involving foreign protagonists, unfolding over the course of the same night. "Far from Yokohama" features a Japanese couple (Youki Kudoh and Masatoshi Nagase) on a cultural pilgrimage, "A Ghost" focuses on an Italian widow (Nicoletta Braschi) stranded in the city overnight, and "Lost in Space" follows the misadventures of a newly single and unemployed Englishman (Joe Strummer) and his reluctant companions (Rick Aviles and Steve Buscemi). The narratives are linked by a run-down flophouse overseen by a night clerk (Screamin' Jay Hawkins) and his disheveled bellboy (Cinqué Lee), the use of Elvis Presley's song "Blue Moon", and a gunshot.

The starting point for the script was the ensemble cast of friends and previous collaborators Jarmusch had conceived characters for, while the tripartite formal structure of the film was inspired by his study of literary forms. Cinematographer Robby Müller and musician John Lurie were among the many contributors who had been involved in earlier Jarmusch projects and returned to work on the film. Mystery Train's US$2.8 million budget (financed by Japanese conglomerate JVC) was considerable compared to what the director had enjoyed before, and allowed him the freedom to rehearse many unscripted background scenes. It was the first of Jarmusch's feature films since Permanent Vacation to depart from his trademark black-and-white photography, though the use of color was tightly controlled to conform with the director's intuitive sense of the film's aesthetic.

Mystery Train was released theatrically by Orion Classics under a restricted rating in the United States, where it grossed over $1.5 million. It enjoyed critical acclaim on the film festival circuit, and like the director's earlier films premiered at the New York Film Festival and was shown in competition at Cannes, where Jarmusch was awarded the Best Artistic Achievement Award. The film was also shown in the Edinburgh, London, Midnight Sun, Telluride, and Toronto film festivals, and was nominated in six categories at the Independent Spirit Awards. Critical reaction was overwhelmingly positive, with reviewers praising the structure, humor, and characters of the film, though there was criticism that the director had not been sufficiently adventurous.

== Plot ==
The film consists of three stories that take place on the same night in downtown Memphis. The three stories are linked together by the Arcade Hotel, a run-down flophouse presided over by a night clerk and a bellboy, where the principal characters in each story spend a part of the night. Every room in the hotel lacks a television (as is noted in each story), but is adorned with a portrait of Elvis Presley.

=== Far from Yokohama ===
The first story features Mitsuko and Jun, a young Japanese couple from Yokohama making a pilgrimage to Memphis during a trip across America. Mitsuko is obsessed with Elvis, and has put together a scrapbook detailing her belief that the singer has a mystical connection to other cultural figures ranging from Madonna to the Buddha to the Statue of Liberty. The story follows the couple as they travel from the train station, through downtown Memphis and a tour of Sun Records, to the Arcade Hotel, before they eventually depart to board the train again.

=== A Ghost ===
The second story is about an Italian widow, Luisa, who is stranded in Memphis while escorting her husband's coffin back to Italy. Luisa shares a room at the hotel with Dee Dee, a young woman who has just left her British boyfriend (Johnny from the final story), and plans to leave the city in the morning. Luisa is kept awake by Dee Dee's constant talking. After Dee Dee finally goes to sleep, Luisa is visited by an apparition of Elvis Presley.

=== Lost in Space ===
The final story introduces Johnny. Upset after losing his job and his girlfriend, Johnny – called Elvis, much to his chagrin – drunkenly brandishes a gun in a bar before leaving with his friend Will Robinson and his ex-girlfriend's brother, Charlie, who believes Johnny to be his brother-in-law. They stop at a liquor store, where the clerk calls Will a racial slur; in retaliation, Johnny shoots the clerk and steals two bottles of whiskey. Fearing the consequences, Johnny, Will, and Charlie retire to the hotel to hide out for the night; there, they all become increasingly intoxicated. Charlie realizes that Will shares the same name as the character Will Robinson from the television show Lost in Space, which Johnny has never heard of. Charlie and Will proceed to tell him about the show, and Will comments that the title describes how he feels then with Charlie and Johnny: lost in space. The next morning, Charlie discovers that Johnny is not really his brother-in-law, which angers him because of what they have been through. Johnny attempts to shoot himself, and while struggling to prevent him, Charlie is accidentally shot in the leg. Leaving the hotel, the three rush to escape a police car that is not even looking for them.

The closing credits show the train, the airport, and final views of the characters from the first two stories.

== Cast ==
- Masatoshi Nagase as Jun
- Youki Kudoh as Mitsuko
- Screamin' Jay Hawkins as Night Clerk
- Cinqué Lee as Bellboy
- Rufus Thomas as Man In Station
- Jodie Markell as Sun Studio Guide
- Nicoletta Braschi as Luisa
- Elizabeth Bracco as Dee Dee, Charlie's Sister
- Sy Richardson as Newsvendor
- Tom Noonan as Man In Diner
- Joe Strummer as Johnny "Elvis"
- Rick Aviles as Will Robinson
- Steve Buscemi as Charlie, The Barber
- Vondie Curtis-Hall as Ed
- Tom Waits as radio D.J. (voice)
- Rockets Redglare as Liquor Store Clerk

== Production ==
=== Script and casting ===
Jarmusch wrote the script for the film under the working title One Night in Memphis, without ever having been to the southern city. He took the idea for "Far from Yokohama", the first segment, from a one-act play he had been writing before filming Down by Law (1986). The play – unrelated to Elvis or Memphis – concerned a constantly argumentative young couple, one of whom gradually comes to realize that their fighting is a unifying force in the relationship. The interconnected stories were inspired by Jarmusch's dwelling on literary forms, and specifically the work of Chaucer, Italian episodic films and Japanese ghost story cinema. As with his other films, Jarmusch's starting point for writing Mystery Train was the actors and characters he had foremost in mind. The great number of these collaborators contributed to it being "the most complicated film to write and execute" according to the director.

What I like about the Japanese kids in Memphis is, if you think about tourists visiting Italy, the way the Romantic poets went to Italy to visit the remnants of a past culture, and then if you imagine America in the future, when people from the East or wherever visit our culture after the decline of the American empire – which is certainly in progress – all they'll really have to visit will be the homes of rock'n'roll stars and movie stars. That's all our culture ultimately represents. So going to Memphis is a kind of pilgrimage to the birthplace of a certain part of our culture.

— Jim Jarmusch, Interview, November 1989.

The role of Johnny was written by Jarmusch specifically for Joe Strummer, who had been the frontman of The Clash, the director's favorite 1980s rock band. Jarmusch had conceived the part a few years previously while the two were together in Spain, and although the musician had been in a period of depression at the time following the collapse of the band, he was drawn by the Memphis setting of the film. Unlike the jovial Steve Buscemi, Strummer did not stay on set to joke with the veteran actors between shots, but instead preferred to keep his own company, focusing intensively on orienting himself to the role.

Jarmusch had met blues singer Screamin' Jay Hawkins after featuring his music prominently in his breakthrough feature Stranger Than Paradise (1984). Although reticent about acting, Hawkins responded favorably to the director's offer to appear. The part of Luisa was also written by the director with the star – actress Nicoletta Braschi – in mind; the two had previously collaborated on Down by Law (1986). Cinqué Lee is the younger brother of director Spike Lee, a longtime friend of Jarmusch from their days at New York University's film school, while Youki Kudoh was cast after the director saw her performance in Sōgo Ishii's The Crazy Family (1984) while promoting Down by Law in Japan. Repeat Jarmusch collaborators who worked on the film included John Lurie who provided the original music, cinematographer Robby Müller, and singer Tom Waits, who in a voice appearance reprised his role of radio DJ Lee Baby Sims from Down by Law. Other cameos include Jarmusch's long-time girlfriend Sara Driver as an airport clerk, Rufus Thomas as the man in the train station who greets the Japanese couple, Rockets Redglare as the clerk of the liquor store, Vondie Curtis-Hall as Ed, Sy Richardson as the news vendor, and Richard Boes and Tom Noonan as diner patrons.

=== Filming ===
Mystery Train was filmed in Memphis in the summer of 1988. After arriving in the city during a snowstorm to scout for shooting locations, Jarmusch drove around without direction before coming to the intersection of a disused train station, the Arcade Luncheonette diner, and the dilapidated Arcade Hotel that would become the film's core setting. He would later recount the experience in a March 1990 interview in Spin: "Man, ... this crossroad is filled with so many ghosts. You know Robert Johnson walked down that street, you know Muddy Waters was in that train station." The locale of the intersection was one of the film's primary formal elements; the effect of Jarmusch returning to the setting with different characters under different circumstances was one of the variations on a theme.

Jarmusch chose a cool palette for the film, accentuated with an occasional jolt of red as shown here by the suit of the Night Clerk (Screamin' Jay Hawkins) contrasted with the muted background of the hotel lobby.

The film was shot in bright, primary colors rather than the black-and-white of the director's previous features, but it retained his usual languid pacing. Jarmusch characterized the color choice as "intuitive". He deliberately chose a cool color palette, eschewing yellows and oranges and using only sporadic dashes of red (as in the Japanese couple's ubiquitous suitcase). This motif of flashes of red was later described by Suzanne Scott of Reverse Shot as "giving the impression of a failed attempt to grab a bit of Elvis's glamor and try it on for size, only to inevitably discover that it looks cartoonish out of context". Stills from the film as well as on-location shots of the actors and the film crew by photographer Masayoshi Sukita were published to accompany the film as the photo collection Mystery Train: A Film by Jim Jarmusch.

Mystery Train was the first American independent film to be financed by Japanese conglomerate JVC, and was produced on a budget – $2.8 million – that was considerable by Jarmusch's modest standards. The company was enthusiastic about underwriting the film despite the director insisting on retaining full creative control, and went on to fund his next three features. The substantial budget and time available gave Jarmusch the opportunity to shoot in color and to rehearse with the actors many scenes not in the script, including several from the courtship of Mitsuko and Jun. At a Memphis nightclub with the Japanese actors during production, the director had Masatoshi Nagase – who spoke little English but was an accomplished mimic – try chat-up lines on the female clientele as an acting exercise. Jarmusch took advantage of the production to make the second installment of his Coffee and Cigarettes series, a collection of short vignettes featuring acquaintances of the director sitting about drinking coffee and smoking cigarettes. The "Memphis Version", titled Twins, starred bickering twins Cinqué and Joie Lee alongside Steve Buscemi as an obtuse waiter who expounds his theory of Elvis having an evil twin to a hostile reception.

== Release ==
[Mystery Train] is a meditation on nighttime and transience, on rhythm-and-blues and the city of Memphis, that comes camouflaged as a deck of three stories. Like its predecessors, it mixes high and low comedy, sadness and high jinks, and extracts a subtle, limpid beauty from the rawest of materials

— Lucy Sante, Interview, November 1989.

The film had its domestic premiere at the 27th New York Film Festival in 1989, thereby emulating the director's previous features Stranger Than Paradise in 1984, and Down by Law in 1986. The Miami Herald declared it the "quiet triumph" of the festival. The film was picked up for theatrical distribution by Orion Classics in the United States, where it was released under an R-rating due to scenes featuring brief nudity and strong language. Its total domestic gross was $1,541,218, making it the 153rd highest-grossing film of 1989, and the 70th highest R-rated film of the year. Internationally, it was first shown in competition at the 1989 Cannes Film Festival on May 13 and 14, 1989, and subsequently featured in the Edinburgh, London, Midnight Sun, Telluride and Toronto film festivals.

Mystery Train was released on DVD on March 28, 2000, with an aspect ratio of 1.85:1 and Dolby Digital 5.1/2 surround sound. The DVD release was criticized by Anna Lazowski of AllMovie who awarded it two stars out of five compared to four for the film itself, citing the paltry special features of 24 scene selections and a collectible behind-the-scenes booklet. A Criterion Collection DVD and Blu-ray were released on June 15, 2010, utilizing a new restored high-definition digital transfer.

== Soundtrack ==
- Mystery Train - Written by Junior Parker and Sam Phillips - Performed by Elvis Presley
- Mystery Train - Written by Junior Parker and Sam Phillips - Performed by Junior Parker
- Blue Moon - Written by Richard Rodgers and Lorenz Hart - Performed by Elvis Presley
- Domino - Written by Roy Orbison and Norman Petty - Performed by Roy Orbison
- The Memphis Train - Written by Rufus Thomas, Mack Rice and Willie Sparks - Performed by Rufus Thomas
- Get Your Money Where You Spend Your Time - Written by James Palmer and Tommy Tate - Performed by Bobby Bland
- Pain in my Heart - Written by Allen Toussaint - Performed by Otis Redding
- Soul Finger - Written by Jimmy King, Phalon Jones, Carl Cunningham, Ben Cauley, Ronnie Caldwell and James Alexander - Performed by The Bar-Kays
- Mystery Train Suite - Written and Performed by John Lurie

== Critical reception ==
Like Jarmusch's previous films, Mystery Train enjoyed a warm reception from critics. This was particularly evident at Cannes, where the film was nominated for the Palme d'Or and Jarmusch was commended for the festival's Best Artistic Achievement. It was nominated in six categories at the 1989 Independent Spirit Awards: Best Picture, Best Screenplay (Jim Jarmusch), Best Director (Jim Jarmusch), Best Cinematography (Robby Müller), Best Actress (Youki Kudoh), and Best Supporting Actor (Steve Buscemi and Screamin' Jay Hawkins).

Entertainment Weekly reviewer Ira Robbins gave the film a B+ rating, complimenting it as "conceptually ambitious" and concluding that its "offbeat characters, fine cinematography, and novel structure make for entertaining viewing". Robert Fulford of the National Post hailed it as "eccentric and deliriously funny", while Rolling Stone's Phil Whitman remarked that the director's "bracing, original comedy may be mostly smoke and air, but it's not insubstantial". In The New York Times, Vincent Canby called it "thoroughly fascinating, a delight" and the director's best effort to date, drawing note to its retention of the "same kind of dour, discordant charm" exhibited by Stranger Than Paradise. He praised Jarmusch's development as a screenwriter – citing the restrained dialogue, humor and subtlety of the narrative and the careful construction of the plot – and the performances he elicited from the ensemble cast. John Hartl, in The Seattle Times, also drew a comparison with Stranger Than Paradise, judging Mystery Train to be the more accessible work while retaining the dry wit of its predecessor.

Hal Hinson of The Washington Post was unimpressed with the film, calling it Jarmusch's "least engaging, and the first in which his bohemian posturing actually becomes an irritant". Of the film's characters, critic Jonathan Rosenbaum of the Chicago Reader wrote that some were "beautifully imagined and realized, while others seem drawn from a more familiar stockpile, designed for reuse rather than discovery". David Denby, concluding a mixed review of the film for New York Magazine, mused that "one feels Jarmusch has pushed hipsterism and cool about as far as they can go, and that isn't nearly far enough." This reproach was echoed by other reviewers who found that the film's style did not stray far from that of the director's earlier work – a critical backlash that would be amplified two years later following the release of Night on Earth (1991).

Postmodern cultural critic bell hooks cited the interaction in the Memphis train station between Thomas and the Japanese couple as one of the few examples of nuanced, deconstructive and subversive treatment of blackness in American film. In his original review for the Chicago Sun-Times, Roger Ebert proclaimed that "[t]he best thing about Mystery Train is that it takes you to an America you feel you ought to be able to find for yourself, if you only knew where to look." He later included the movie in his Great Movies collection, comparing the movie favorably to Jarmusch's later efforts like Dead Man and The Limits of Control. In an April 2000 retrospective of Jarmusch's work for Sight & Sound, Shawn Levy concluded that the film was "as much a valentine to the allure of the American way of pop culture as it is a cheeky bit of structural legerdemain without terribly much resonating significance". On the review aggregator website Rotten Tomatoes, 89% of 36 critics' reviews are positive. The website's consensus reads: "Mystery Train meanders by design, but it never goes off the rails, retaining its deadpan cool throughout."

=== Accolades ===
Award	Date of ceremony	Category	Recipient(s)	Result	Ref.
Cannes Film Festival	May 23, 1989	Palme d'Or	Jim Jarmusch	Nominated	
Cannes Film Festival	May 23, 1989	Best Artistic Contribution	Jim Jarmusch	Won	
Independent Spirit Awards	March 24, 1990	Best Feature	Mystery Train	Nominated	
Independent Spirit Awards	March 24, 1990	Best Director	Jim Jarmusch	Nominated	
Independent Spirit Awards	March 24, 1990	Best Actress	Youki Kudoh	Nominated	
Independent Spirit Awards	March 24, 1990	Best Supporting Actor	Steve Buscemi	Nominated	
Independent Spirit Awards	March 24, 1990	Best Supporting Actor	Screamin' Jay Hawkins	Nominated	
Independent Spirit Awards	March 24, 1990	Best Screenplay	Jim Jarmusch	Nominated	
Independent Spirit Awards	March 24, 1990	Best Cinematography	Robby Müller	Nominated	
