= Pages from Cold Point =

- Short story by Paul Bowles
- Country: United States
- Language: English

Publication
- Published in: Wake: The Creative Magazine
- Publication date: Autumn 1949

"Pages from Cold Point" is a short story by Paul Bowles. It was first published in the Autumn 1949 issue of Wake: The Creative Magazine. It was republished in New Directions in Prose and Poetry #11 (December 1949). It later appeared in a collection of his short fiction, The Delicate Prey and Other Stories, published by Random House in 1950. Bowles wrote the story in 1947 while aboard the MS Ferncape en route to Casablanca from New York.

A controversial work at the time of its publication—due in part to its homosexual and incestuous subject matter—"Pages from Cold Point" was not included, nor his "The Delicate Prey", in the British collection A Little Stone published by John Lehmann in 1950.

"Pages from Cold Point" figures among the works of gay fiction that emerged in American literature in the post-World War II period.

== Plot ==
Norton, an American University professor, has taken an early retirement on an unidentified Caribbean island off the coast of Cuba following the death of his wife; her financial legacy allows him to do so comfortably. Despite the strenuous objections of his elder brother, Charles, Norton removes his 16-year-old son Racky from school to serve as his companion. They share a rental property at the remote Cold Point, a tropical paradise whose amenities include a number of native house servants, a cook, and a groundskeeper, Peter.

Racky begins to make mysterious visits to the nearby village of Orange Walk. Norton suppresses his own anxiousness about these excursions, even after a local woman warns him "Keep your boy at home, Mahn." Later, Norton is visited by a parish constable, who informs him that his son Racky "has no shame. He does what he pleases with all the young boys, and the men, too, and gives them a shilling so they won't tell about it." Norton is dismayed and offended by these reports, but is daunted at the prospect of confronting his son. When a physical altercation occurs between Peter and Racky, the groundskeeper is dismissed. The household staff becomes demoralized. Racky rejects the suggestion by his father that he resume his schooling. Norton takes him to Havana, finds an apartment for him and buys him an automobile. Norton returns to Cold Point to live in isolation.

== Critical assessment ==
Literary critic Oliver Evans writes:

"The least successful [of Bowles's stories] in which the horror constitutes an end in itself, [is] 'Pages from Cold Point', a study of homosexual incest, a brilliant tour de force written in Bowles's very best manner but without any apparent root in the author's fundamental convictions: in this respect, as also in the cumulative horror of its situation and its technical perfection, it reminds us of The Turn of the Screw."

Novelist Norman Mailer remarked that "Pages from Cold Point" was "one of the best short stories written by anybody..."

== Theme and style ==
Literary critic Allen Hibbard locates the theme of "Pages from Cold Point" in its opening passage. This first-person confessional, in the voice of protagonist Norton, "closely resembles" the author's own sentiments.":

Our civilization is doomed to a short life; its component parts are too heterogeneous. I am personally content to see everything in a process of decay. The bigger the bombs, the quicker it will be done. Life is visually too hideous for one to make the attempt to preserve it. Let it go. Perhaps some day another form of life will come along. Either way it is of no consequence. At the same time, I am still part of life, and I am bound by this to protect myself to whatever extent I am able.

Hibbard adds that the passage demonstrates Bowles's "modernist brand of pessimism" typical of the post-war period.

Literary critic Catherine Rainwater comments on the influence of Edgar Allan Poe on the characterization of his protagonist and narrator Norton:

Like several of Poe's stories such as "The Fall of the House of Usher" and "Ligeia", which involve irrational, unreliable narrators (or narrators such as those in "The Tell-Tale Heart" and "The Cask of Amontillado" who are so exaggeratedly rational that they appear deranged) "Pages from Cold Point" lends itself to interpretation as psychomachia."

== Sources ==
- Bowles, Paul. 2001. Paul Bowles; Collected Stories, 1939–1976. Black Sparrow Press. Santa Rosa. 2001.ISBN 0-87685-396-3
- Hibbard, Allen. 1993. Paul Bowles: A Study of the Short Fiction. Twayne Publishers. New York. ISBN 0-8057-8318-0
- Prose, Francine. 2002. The Coldest Eye: acting badly among the Arabs. Harper's Magazine. March 2002. https://harpers.org/archive/2002/03/the-coldest-eye/ Retrieved July 10, 2022.
- Vidal, Gore. 1979. Introduction to Paul Bowles; Collected Stories, 1939–1976. Black Sparrow Press. Santa Rosa. 2001. ISBN 0-87685-396-3
