= The Echo (short story) =

- Short story by Paul Bowles
- Country: United States
- Language: English

Publication
- Published in: Harper's Bazaar
- Publication date: September 1946

"The Echo" is a short story by Paul Bowles written in 1946 and first published in the September 1946 issue of Harper's Bazaar magazine. It was later published in a collection of his short fiction, The Delicate Prey and Other Stories, published by Random House in 1950.

== Plot ==
The story is written in the third-person limited Omniscient, where the focal character is Aileen. The setting is in a village near Barranquilla, Colombia. Aileen is attending college near Northampton, Massachusetts (presumably Smith College). Her mother, who is estranged from Aileen's father, has moved back to the large family properties in tropical Colombia, staffed by local servants. She invites Aileen to visit during the summer school break. The mother's companion, Prue, lives on the estate, and though never made explicit to Aileen, they are lesbian lovers. Prue, an artisan, works in her studio. The mother is preoccupied with an architectural home improvement, a cantilevered wing that overhangs precariously over a deep gorge adjacent to the house. The two women are self-absorbed in their comfortable lifestyles and relationship. In the invitation note, Aileen's mother engages in mild recriminations, disparaging her for earlier descriptions of Prue as "peculiar" and for "not liking her much." The note is a cheerful and chatty inventory of the operations on the estate, with fulsome praise for Prue. The missive lacks any expression of intimacy towards her daughter.

Aileen lands at the Barranquilla airport, expecting the two women to meet her. She finally finds them at a local cantina. When Aileen sprains her ankle entering the establishment, she is taken to the estate and convalesces for the next few days.

Several encounters between Prue and Aileen reveal that Prue resents the girl's visit. Supercilious and hostile toward the younger woman, her bullying is met with passive incredulity by Aileen. The mother interviews Aileen, expressing hurt and dismay that she is "not getting on very well with Prue." When the mother terms her daughter as merely a "guest", Aileen responds that Prue "is a maniac." The contretemps deepens the estrangement between mother and daughter.

Aileen, enthralled by the beauty of the tropical landscape, takes an early morning walk across the nearby river and wanders into a poor, rural hamlet. She is approached by a young man who beckons to her. Leaning forward, he spits a mouthful of water in her face. Aileen, outraged, flings a stone at the perpetrator as he retreats into his hut; a scream is heard.

When she returns to the house, Prue informs her that her mother, not finding her in bed, has "had a fit" and savagely berates her for causing the couple anxiety. The mother determines that Aileen has upset the harmony of the household and is told she must depart. The climax occurs in a final confrontation between Aileen and Prue the following day. As the girl prepares to leave, the older woman begins to harass her verbally. In a last parting shot, she flicks water in Aileen's face: "the reaction was instantaneous." Aileen, furious and humiliated, begins to pummel Prue with her fists, then kicks her as she falls to the floor, uttering "the greatest scream of her life." Aileen departs on her journey towards Barranquilla, affecting her liberation from her mother and Prue.

== Critical assessment ==
Literary critic Allen Hibbard praises "The Echo" for its "masterful regulation of the dramatic pace" and observes, "Bowles never tells how to feel about a story. Moral ambiguities are displayed without authorial intervention. It is up to us to think through a story's implications and meaning."

Author Jane Bowles remarked on "The Echo' in a letter to her spouse Bowles:

The tension as usual is terrific. It seems like an innocent enough little story when it begins and the way in which you had shaded it becomes steadily more somber, almost as imperceptibly to the reader as to the girl herself, is, I should say, masterful. I read it twice because I could not quite encompass it.

== Theme and symbolism ==
"The Echo", much like Bowles's "Pages From Cold Point", involves a well-to-do, yet wholly dysfunctional family, whose members clash in post-colonial tropics. Literary critic Allen Hibbard writes:

"The Echo" and "Pages From Cold Point" deserve special mention. In both stories homosexuality, the problematic nature of family ties, and expatriation are intimately intertwined…[In "The Echo"] Aileen's arrival forces a confrontation with her mother's sexual orientation and the form it has taken in her life.

The attempt to find refuge as expatriates only brings Aileen, her mother and Prue into a proximity that has explosive results.

=== The gorge and the cantilevered house ===
The key symbolic elements in the story are the gorge, a deep ravine with "vertical walls" coursing with water, and the new wing of the house which is cantilevered directly over the ravine. Critic Hibbard observes: "The very construction of the house, its precarious perch above the abyss, becomes a symbol for the human condition as it evolves in the story…the gorge is a lurking force that outside which threatens all our ideas of order and stability." While Aileen's mother is enthralled by the architectural innovation and jocularly compares it to a view over the Grand Canyon, her daughter avoids this portion of the house and stays in the old wing, which rests on solid ground. The purported stability of the engineering feat and the pseudo-equilibrium briefly sustained by the three women threatens to collapse.

The final confrontation between Prue and Aileen exposes the submerged resentments. According to literary critic Joyce Carol Oates, the story's climactic physical confrontation leads to Aileen's "liberation" from her mother and Prue.

The denouement of "The Echo" depicts Aileen departing the estate on horseback, "cantilevered over the gorge", on the road towards Barranquilla and back to the United States.

=== The "spitting" incidents ===
Three references or incidents that involve or resemble spitting appear in "The Echo". These reflect Aileen's struggle, and failure, to become more than a 'guest" and to "claim her rights as a full-fledged member of the family."

The first of these is a reference to an early New Yorker cartoon, which depicts two men at the rim of The Grand Canyon. The caption reads: "Did you ever want to spit a mile, Bill? Now's your chance." The mother's citing of this joke parallels her erroneous complacency regarding her relationship with Aileen.

The next incident occurs when a local man approaches Aileen in a shanty town and spits a mouthful of water in her face. The unprovoked assault angers the girl, and she hurls a stone at him in retaliation.

The final "spitting" incident occurs when Prue, cornering Aileen, attempts to forcibly extract a farewell. When the young woman turns pale, Prue taunts her—"Feel faint?"—and dipping her fingertips into a glass of water, flicks the droplets into Aileen's face. The action unleashes Aileen's pent up fury that she feels towards her mother and Prue and leads to the dramatic violence at the story's finale.

== Sources ==
- Bowles, Paul. 2001. Paul Bowles; Collected Stories, 1939-1976. Black Sparrow Press. Santa Rosa. 2001.ISBN 0-87685-396-3
- Hibbard, Allen. 1993. Paul Bowles: A Study of the Short Fiction. Twayne Publishers. New York. ISBN 0-8057-8318-0
- Prose, Francine. 2002. The Coldest Eye: acting badly among the Arabs. Harper's Magazine. March 2002. https://harpers.org/archive/2002/03/the-coldest-eye/ Retrieved July 10, 2022.
- Vidal, Gore. 1979. Introduction to Paul Bowles; Collected Stories, 1939-1976. Black Sparrow Press. Santa Rosa. 2001. ISBN 0-87685-396-3
