= Tea on the Mountain =

1939 short story by Paul Bowles

- Short story by Paul Bowles
- Country: United States
- Language: English

Publication
- Published in: The Delicate Prey and Other Stories
- Publication date: 1950

"Tea on the Mountain" is a short story by Paul Bowles. Written in 1939, the story first appeared in the 1950 collection The Delicate Prey and Other Stories published by Random House. In the United Kingdom, it was published under the title "A Spring Day" in the collection A Little Stone (1950, John Lehmann).

"Tea on the Mountain" was penned by the 28-year-old Bowles while he was living in an apartment in Columbia Heights, District of Columbia. Bowles would return to the plot and themes of this story with The Time of Friendship (1962).

The story is the earliest short fiction of Bowles's oeuvre and is included in Paul Bowles: Collected Stories, 1939–1976 (1980) by Black Sparrow Press.

== Plot ==
An American author (her name is not provided) sojourns in the Tangier International Zone during the 1930s, wishing to live cheaply on a generous advance from her publisher while writing a novel. As an unaccompanied Western woman, she has attracted the interest of a handsome, Europeanized Arab youth, Driss. (He ignores Islamic prohibitions on alcohol consumption, and drinks freely). He has established a friendly and proprietary, but not intimate, relationship with her, and she has allowed him to serve as her escort in the evenings. Driss accompanies her to a local cafe for tea and there they join two of his schoolmates, Mijd and Ghazi. She is intrigued by Mijd. When Ghazi remarks that Mijd's elder brother, the family patriarch, has tuberculosis, Mijd is outraged and silences his comrade. He explains to her that syphilis, leprosy and pneumonia may be admitted in polite company, but never tuberculosis, a disease he associates with degenerate "Paris morals." The American is aware of the Moslem gender prejudices that prevail among her companions. When the conversation turns to the quality of one's stockings, she admits that she wears none. Midj is momentarily scandalized, but she reassures the youths by casually laying several hundred francs on the table as she pretends to search for a mirror in her handbag.

Mijd proposes the group have a picnic at his family's country villa. He encourages the "mademoiselle" to procure ham and wine for the excursion. This flagrant violation of Islamic law distresses Ghazi. Driss, who has been drinking alcohol is "roaring drunk." Amused, she excuses herself and goes to have lunch alone.

The next day Mijd and Ghazi arrive in a carriage and collect the "English lady" and the provisions. At the picnic site at the villa, the boys devour the forbidden wine and ham, more as an act of defiance against parental rule than because they enjoy it. When Ghazi takes a nap, the woman accompanies Mijd to a secluded garden. There he briefly removes his shirt to prove to her, by the lightness of his skin, the evidence of his European ancestry. He praises her beauty and declares her his "sister." As they sit quietly together, an overwhelming sense of melancholy seizes her. At a peasant's dwelling they are given some slightly polluted water to drink. When she questions its source, Mijd reprimands her for a gross lack of etiquette, and smashes the earthen jug.

They return together to the estate to have tea. The woman begins to realize the falsity of her position. She recognizes that her decision to join the boys was as effort to fulfill "an unconscious desire she had harbored for many years. To be free, out-of-doors, with some young men she did not know-could (italics) not know – was probably the important part of the dream." Her expression of discontent troubles Mijd, but he is content that she remain. When she asks what he does when he skips school, he boasts that he spends the day making love to a 12-year-old mistress in a garret in the Casbah. She realizes her utter inability to bridge the cultural chasm between herself and the Arab boy. She admits to herself "this is over." Mijd delivers her to her hotel and she informs him of her departure for Paris the next day. In his ignorance, Mijd believes that will correspond, and that someday he will travel with her to America.

== Theme ==
"Bowles' characters seem the dramatic proof of a radical impossibility, the impossibility of love. Human relationships are, with scarcely few exceptions, shown as sterile or intolerable…at times implausible. Rape, incest, lesbianism, homosexuality, adultery, and simple betrayal, with all their attending virulence, betoken the most complete negation of human love to which a novelist can may refer." – Ihab Hassan from The Pilgrim as Prey: A Note on Paul Bowles in Western Review 19 (1954):23–36

"Tea on the Mountain", the earliest of his short fiction oeuvre, "prefigures one of Bowles's obsessive beliefs: the need for, and the impossibility of, communication among people", according to biographer Lawrence Steward. The focal character of the story, a nameless America novelist, is sojourning in Tangiers, ostensibly for the favorable exchange rate which makes living there cheap, though "she is also led by a vague yearning for sexual adventure." Her "romantic yearning" and a desire to escape the "puritanical morality of America" appear attainable in the cosmopolitan environment of the International Zone. This passive expectation that a romance will materialize is misplaced and disingenuous. Biographer Allen Hibbard comments on the encounter between "radically different cultures":

To the Moroccan male, she becomes an unwitting symbol of available sexuality and corruption. Desire to possess the Western woman…is fed by advertising and economic deprivation, and a conquest is a sign of virility as well as a way of avenging a gnawing condition of political impotence. The process of corruption is symbiotic. As much as the West thrusts itself on the East, the East eagerly awaits all the freedoms and glamour it often perceives the West as offering.

These are the "psychological and historic dynamics" that inform the characters in the story. The American woman, who has the freedom "to come and go as she pleases" betrays the boys she has pointlessly enticed. Lawrence Steward writes:

The tea ceremony—like hospitality itself, which is to unite men in peace and understanding — is here shelter perversion. The religious dietary laws are broken, and the woman is far older than the boys; she likes Morocco only for the cheapness of the land and the cheap availability of a qualified by delicious terror. We have the prelude to the sexual act, but timidity and indifference interfere. It is the hunt without the kill…Since terror is an essential ingredient to her pleasure, she flaunts her money and her solitude, pretending to be an easy victim. But this courting of danger is only the courting of vulgarity…she extracts emotions from the boys, using Mijd as she did Driss earlier "putting him off without losing his friendship."

== Sources ==
- Bowles, Paul. 2001. 'Paul Bowles; Collected Stories, 1939–1976'. Black Sparrow Press. Santa Rosa. 2001.ISBN 0876853963
- Hibbard, Allen. 1993. Paul Bowles: A Study of the Short Fiction'. Twayne Publishers. New York. ISBN 0-8057-8318-0
