= Blue Angel (novel) =

2000 novel by Francine Prose

Blue Angel is a novel written by author Francine Prose that was published in the year 2000. The novel is about the complex relationship between Ted – a 47 years old English professor – and his student Angela that evolves as a satire on sexual harassment on college campuses. This was Prose's 10th publication.

== Reception ==
Boston Review wrote about the book, "One problem with message-driven theater or literature—presumably, Prose's message is that legislating matters of the heart sets a dangerous precedent in terms of privacy and freedom—is that it quickly dates itself."

Kirkus Reviews said, "An academic comedy of manners as engaging as Richard Russo's Straight Man: Prose once again proves herself one of our great cultural satirists."
