= Felice Rosser =

Felice Rosser (born Detroit, Michigan) is a singer, songwriter, bass player, actor and writer. She now lives and works in New York. She is known for her powerful and emotional voice, her musical skill as a bass player and as a singer and songwriter. She also performs as an actress.

== Education ==
She attended the Roeper School and Cass Technical High School in Detroit before enrolling at Barnard College in New York City.

== Career ==
=== Music ===
Rosser's musical career began playing bass in bands with singer/guitarist deerfrance and performance artist and writer jennifer jazz. She became interested in playing reggae music and joined Sistren, an all-female band led by drummer Annette Brissett. She has played with many musicians and artists including Bush Tetras, Jean-Michel Basquiat, Gary Lucas and Ari Up of the Slits. Rosser leads Faith, a group that includes guitarist Nao Hakamada. Faith has released a 7-inch "Like Springtime b/w Lost", and 2 CD's 2001's Time to Fall in Love Again and 2007's A Place Where Love Can Grow on Cool Baby Music. Faith also has a song "Time to Fall in Love Again" in the film “The Substitute part 2.”

=== Film and acting ===
Rosser has appeared in films including; Permanent Vacation directed by Jim Jarmusch, You are not I directed by Sara Driver and Born in Flames directed by Lizzie Borden. Rosser has also done theater work with The Puerto Rican National Traveling Theater and the off-Broadway production of “Driving on the Left Side.”

=== Writing ===
Rosser has published various short stories in Bomb Magazine.

== Recordings ==
=== Discography ===
- Singles

- 7 inch — "Like Springtime/Lost"

=== Albums ===
- Time to Fall in Love Again 2000 /Cool Baby Music,
- A Place Where Love Can Grow 2007 /Cool Baby Music
