= Reading Like a Writer =

Book by Francine Prose

- Cover of the first edition
- Author: Francine Prose
- Cover artist: Roberto de Viqde Cumptich
- Language: English
- Genre: Nonfiction
- Publisher: HarperCollins
- Publication date: 2006
- Publication place: United States
- Media type: Print (Hardback)
- Pages: 275 pp
- ISBN: 0-06-077704-4
- OCLC: 62762325
- Dewey Decimal: 808/.02 22
- LC Class: PE1408 .P774 2006

Reading Like a Writer is a writing guide by American writer Francine Prose, published in 2006.

== Background ==
Subtitled "A Guide for People Who Love Books and for Those Who Want to Write Them", — Prose shares how she developed her writing craft through writing and reading. She uses examples from literature to demonstrate how fictional elements, such as character and dialogue, can be mastered.

== Summary ==
- Chapter One: Close Reading

Prose discusses the question of whether writing can be taught. She answers the question by suggesting that although writing workshops can be helpful, the best way to learn to write is to read. Closely reading books, Prose studied word choice and sentence construction. Close reading helped her solve difficult obstacles in her own writing.

- Chapter Two: Words

Prose encourages the reader to slow down and read every word. She reminds the reader that words are the "raw material out of which literature is crafted." Challenging the reader to stop at every word, she suggests the following question be asked: "What is the writer trying to convey with this word?"

- Chapter Three: Sentences

Prose discusses how "the well made sentence transcends time and genre." She believes the writer who is concerned about what constitutes a well-constructed sentence is on the right path. Prose mentions the importance of mastering grammar and how it can improve the quality of a writer's sentence. In this chapter, she also discusses the use of long sentences, short sentences, and rhythm in prose.

- Chapter Four: Paragraphs

Prose discusses that, just as with sentence construction, the writer who is concerned about paragraph construction is stepping in the right direction. She states that the writer who reads widely will discover there are no general rules for building a well-constructed paragraph, but "only individual examples to help point [the writer] in a direction in which [the writer] might want to go."

- Chapter Five: Narration

When determining point of view, Prose says audience is an important factor. She gives examples from literature of point-of-view variations. First person and third person are discussed, and even an example of writing fiction in second person is given.

- Chapter Six: Character

Using examples from the works of Heinrich von Kleist and Jane Austen, Prose discusses how writers can develop characterization. She mentions that Kleist, in his "The Marquise of O—" ignores physical description of the characters, but instead "tells us just as much as we need to know about his characters, then releases them into the narrative that doesn't stop spinning until the last sentence . . ." Excerpts from other pieces of literature are used to show how action, dialogue and even physical description can help develop characterization.

- Chapter Seven: Dialogue

Prose begins this chapter by dispelling the advice that writers should improve and clean up dialogue so it sounds less caustic than actual speech. She believes this idea on dialogue can be taken too far and that dialogue can be used to reveal not only the words on the surface, but the many motivations and emotions of the characters underneath the words.

- Chapter Eight: Details

Using examples from literature, Prose explains how one or two important details can leave a more memorable impression on the reader than a barrage of description.

- Chapter Nine: Gestures

Prose argues that gestures performed by fictional characters should not be "physical clichés" but illuminations that move the narrative.

- Chapter Ten: Learning from Chekhov

Prose gives examples of what she has learned from reading Anton Chekhov. As a creative writing teacher, she would disseminate advice to her students after reading their stories. As a fan of Chekhov, she would read his short stories and find examples of how he would successfully break the "rules" of fiction writing, contradicting something she recently told her students to do in their writing projects. Prose also discusses how Chekhov teaches the writer to write without judgment; she tells how Chekhov practiced not being the "judge of one's characters and their conversations but rather the unbiased observer."

- Chapter Eleven: Reading for Courage

Prose discusses the fears writers may have: revealing too much of themselves in their writing; resisting the pressures that writers must write a certain way; determining whether or not the act of writing is worth it when one considers the state of the world. She concludes her book by stating that the writer may fear creating "weeds" instead of "roses." Continuing the metaphor, she says reading is a way for the writer to see how other gardeners grow their roses.

- Books to Be Read Immediately

Prose includes a list of book recommendations, many of which have selections from those that are used as examples for the concepts she discusses.

== Books to be Read ==
Here are the books in mostly chronological order. The chapters in which they are discussed are in italics.

- Sophocles (trans. Sir George Young) Oedipus Rex
- Anonymous (trans. Dorothy L. Sayers) The Song of Roland
- Miguel de Cervantes (trans. Tobias Smollett) Don Quixote
- William Shakespeare King Lear
- John Milton Paradise Lost
- Samuel Richardson Pamela: Or Virtue Rewarded
- Samuel Johnson The Life of Savage Sentences
- Edward Gibbon Decline and Fall of the Roman Empire
- Jane Austen Sense and Sensibility Paragraphs Character
- Jane Austen Pride and Prejudice Paragraphs Character
- Heinrich von Kleist (trans. Martin Greenberg) The Marquise of O---- and Other Stories Sentences Character
- Stendhal (trans. Roger Gard) The Red and the Black Paragraphs
- Honoré de Balzac (trans. Kathleen Raine) Cousin Bette
- Nikolai Gogol (trans. Richard Pevear and Larissa Volokhonsky) Dead Souls: A Novel Courage
- Charles Dickens Dombey and Son Narration
- Charles Dickens Bleak House
- Emily Bronte Wuthering Heights
- Ivan Turgenev (trans. Isaiah Berlin) First Love
- George Eliot Middlemarch Character
- Herman Melville Bartleby, the Scrivener Paragraphs
- Herman Melville Moby Dick
- Herman Melville Benito Cereno
- Gustave Flaubert (trans. Geoffrey Wall) Madame Bovary Courage
- Gustave Flaubert (trans. Robert Baldick) Sentimental Education Character
- Fyodor Dostoyevsky (trans. Constance Garnett) Crime and Punishment Narration Courage
- Leo Tolstoy (trans. David McDuff) The Kreutzer Sonata and Other Stories
- Leo Tolstoy (trans. Aylmer Maude) The Death of Ivan Ilych and Other Stories Courage
- Leo Tolstoy (trans. Constance Garnett) Anna Karenina
- Leo Tolstoy (trans. Constance Garnett) War and Peace
- Leo Tolstoy (trans. Rosemary Edmonds) Resurrection
- Louisa May Alcott Little Women
- Mark Twain The Adventures of Huckleberry Finn Narration
- James Baldwin Vintage Baldwin Paragraphs
- Henry James The Portrait of a Lady Gesture
- Henry James The Turn of the Screw Narration
- Anton Chekhov (trans. Constance Garnett) Tales of Anton Chekhov: Volumes 1-13 Detail Gesture Chekhov Courage
- Anton Chekhov (trans. Constance Garnett) A Life in Letters Detail
- William Strunk The Elements of Style, Illustrated Sentences
- Marcel Proust (trans. Lydia Davis) Swann's Way Gesture
- Gertrude Stein The Autobiography of Alice B. Toklas Sentences
- Virginia Woolf On Being Ill Sentences
- James Joyce Dubliners Sentences Gesture
- Franz Kafka (trans. Malcolm Pasley) Metamorphosis and Other Stories Detail
- Franz Kafka The Judgement Gesture
- Franz Kafka In the Penal Colony
- Rex Stout Plot It Yourself Paragraphs
- Katherine Mansfield Collected Stories of Katherine Mansfield Words Gesture
- Raymond Chandler The Big Sleep Sentences Gesture
- Ryunosuke Akutagawa (trans. M. Kuwata and Tashaki Kojima) Rashomon and Other Stories
- Konstantin Paustovsky Years of Hope: The Story of a Life Paragraphs
- Rebecca West The Birds Fall Down Sentences
- Rebecca West Black Lamb and Grey Falcon: A Journey Through Yugoslavia Sentences
- Isaac Babel (trans. Walter Morrison) The Collected Stories Paragraphs Courage
- L. P. Hartley The Go-Between Gesture
- F. Scott Fitzgerald The Great Gatsby Words
- F. Scott Fitzgerald Tender is the Night Words
- Ernest Hemingway The Sun Also Rises Sentences
- Ernest Hemingway A Moveable Feast Sentences
- Elizabeth Bowen The House in Paris Detail
- Vladimir Nabokov Lectures on Russian Literature Chekhov
- Vladimir Nabokov Lolita Narration Dialogue
- Nadezhda Mandelstam Hope Against Hope: A Memoir Words
- Christina Stead The Man Who Loved Children Dialogue
- Henry Green Doting Dialogue
- Henry Green Loving Dialogue
- Samuel Beckett The Complete Short Prose, 1929–1989 Gesture Courage
- Francis Steegmuller Flaubert and Madame Bovary: A Double Portrait
- Paul Bowles Collected Stories and Later Writings
- John Cheever The Stories of John Cheever Sentences
- Randall Jarrell Pictures from an Institution
- Jane Bowles Two Serious Ladies Narration Dialogue
- Juan Rulfo (trans. Margaret Sayers Peden) Pedro Páramo Courage
- Peter Taylor A Summons to Memphis Narration
- J. D. Salinger Franny and Zooey Detail
- William Gaddis The Recognitions
- Mavis Gallant Paris Stories Narration
- Italo Calvino Cosmicomics
- Paula Fox Desperate Characters Paragraphs
- Zbigniew Herbert (trans. Czesław Miłosz and Peter Dale Scott) Selected Poems Courage
- Flannery O'Connor Wise Blood Narration Gesture
- Flannery O'Connor A Good Man Is Hard to Find and Other Stories Words
- Flannery O'Connor Collected Stories Detail
- Richard Yates Revolutionary Road Words
- Gabriel García Márquez One Hundred Years of Solitude Paragraphs
- Gabriel García Márquez The Autumn of the Patriarch Paragraphs
- William Trevor The Collected Stories
- William Trevor Fools of Fortune
- William Trevor The Children of Dynmouth
- Stanley Elkin Searches and Seizures Sentences
- Harold Brodkey Stories in an Almost Classical Mode Narration Dialogue
- Donald Barthelme Sixty Stories
- Alice Munro Selected Stories Words
- John le Carré A Perfect Spy Dialogue
- Philip Roth American Pastoral Sentences
- Philip Roth Novels and Stories 1959–1962 Gesture
- Diane Johnson Persian Nights Narration
- Diane Johnson Le Divorce Narration
- Thomas Pynchon Gravity's Rainbow
- Raymond Carver Where I'm Calling From: Selected Stories Sentences Paragraphs
- Raymond Carver Cathedral
- Stuart Dybek I Sailed with Magellan Narration
- Joy Williams Escapes Dialogue
- Scott Spencer A Ship Made of Paper
- Tim O'Brien The Things They Carried Sentences
- Charles Baxter Believers: A Novella and Stories Gesture
- David Gates The Wonders of the Invisible World: Stories Dialogue
- Denis Johnson Jesus' Son
- Denis Johnson Angels Paragraphs
- Tatyana Tolstaya Sleepwalker in a Fog Words
- Bruce Wagner I'm Losing You Character
- Jay McInerney Bright Lights, Big City Narration
- Jonathan Franzen The Corrections Paragraphs
- Deborah Eisenberg The Stories (So Far) of Deborah Eisenberg Narration
- Richard Price Freedomland Narration
- Edward St Aubyn Some Hope: A Trilogy Gesture
- Edward St Aubyn Mother's Milk Dialogue
- James Wood Broken Estates: Essays on Literature and Belief
- Junot Díaz Drown Gesture
- Gary Shteyngart The Russian Debutante's Handbook Paragraphs
- ZZ Packer Drinking Coffee Elsewhere Gesture
- Konstantin Paustovsky (trans. Joseph Barnes) Years of Hope: The Story of a Life
