= Rick Aviles =

American stand-up comedian and actor (1952–1995)

- Aviles as Willie Lopez in Ghost (1990)
- Born: Richard Anthony Aviles; October 14, 1952; Manhattan, New York, U.S.
- Died: March 17, 1995 (aged 42); Los Angeles, California, U.S.
- Occupations: Actor; stand-up comedian
- Years active: 1980–1995

Rick Aviles (October 14, 1952 – March 17, 1995) was an American stand-up comedian and actor of Puerto Rican descent, best remembered for his role as Willie Lopez in the film Ghost.

== Career ==
Born in Manhattan, Aviles worked as a street performer and stand-up comedian on the Greenwich Village night-club circuit in New York in the 1970s and 1980s. In 1978, a Variety reviewer called him "a comic with a future". He was frequently seen in the NYC subways, doing his act for the riders. He made his film debut as Mad Dog in 1981's The Cannonball Run. He went on to work in several other films, including minor parts in Street Smart and The Secret of My Success, both released in 1987. That same year he became the host of It's Showtime at the Apollo, which he continued as host until 1991.

A Variety review of his stand-up act in 1990 noted, "Utilizing masterful ethnic impersonations and a remarkably rubbery face, Puerto Rican comic Rick Aviles comes off as one of the brightest and most consistently clever stand-ups working the circuit today".

In 1990, Aviles landed his most memorable role: the hired killer Willie Lopez in Ghost, a smash hit at the box office that received multiple Oscar nominations. He also appeared in Jim Jarmusch's Mystery Train (1989) as Will Robinson; Francis Ford Coppola's The Godfather Part III (1990) as Mask #1; Brian De Palma's Carlito's Way (1993) as Quisqueya; in Waterworld (1995) as the Gatesman, and in Joe's Apartment (1996) as the voice of a cockroach.

Among the television series in which he appeared are Mr. & Mrs. Dracula (1980), The Day Women Got Even (1980), The Carol Burnett Show (1991) and Stephen King's The Stand (1994).

== Death ==
Aviles died on March 17, 1995, from heart failure according to Variety. Eleven years later, a 2006 article in Entertainment Weekly listed him as among the celebrities who had contracted HIV and died from complications of AIDS.

== Filmography ==
Film
Year	Film	Role	Notes
1981	The Cannonball Run	Mad Dog	
1984	Billions for Boris	Hector	
1987	Street Smart	Solo	
1987	The Secret of My Success	Maintenance man	
1988	Mondo New York	Comic in park	
1988	Spike of Bensonhurst	Bandana	Alternative titles: The Mafia Kid or Throwback!
1989	Mystery Train	Will Robinson	Segment: "Lost in Space"
1989	Identity Crisis	El Toro	
1990	Ghost	Willie Lopez	
1990	The Godfather Part III	Mask #1	
1990	Green Card	Vincent	
1993	The Saint of Fort Washington	Rosario	
1993	Carlito's Way	Quisqueya	
1995	Waterworld	Atoll Gatesman	
1996	Joe's Apartment	Cockroach	Voice only
Television
Year	Title	Role	Notes
1980	Mr. and Mrs. Dracula	Mario	Unknown episodes
1980	The Day the Women Got Even	Pancho Diaz	
1987	The Equalizer	Scam	Episode: "A Place to Stay"
1989	No Place Like Home	J.J.	
1991	Monsters	Mr. Vega	1 episode
1991	Law & Order	Hector (uncredited)	Episode: "The Secret Sharers"
1991	The Carol Burnett Show	Skit characters	Unknown episodes
1993	Moon Over Miami	Frankie the Rat	1 episode
1994	The Stand	Rat man	Miniseries
Video Games
Year	Title	Role	Notes
1997	Waterworld: The Quest For Dry Land	Atoll Gatesman	

== See also ==
- List of Puerto Ricans
- List of Puerto Ricans of African descent
- African immigration to Puerto Rico
