= After (Prose novel) =

2003 young adult novel written by Francine Prose

- Author: Francine Prose
- Publication date: March 18, 2003

After is a 2003 young adult novel written by Francine Prose. The nearby school shooting is reminiscent of the Columbine High School massacre in 1999.

== Plot ==
After a school shooting 50 miles away, the new grief and crisis counselor (Dr. Willner) attempts to control the students' lives, using the recent tragedy as an excuse for increasingly restricting their lives. The school gradually is controlled by the grip of the administration, and students who do not comply with the new rules disappear, never to be seen again.

== Analysis ==
Its plot is reminiscent of Nineteen Eighty-Four by George Orwell. Parallels have also been drawn to mind control works like Invasion of the Body Snatchers and Night of the Living Dead.

Similarities include the normalization of propaganda and surveillance with the telescreens in 1984 and the TVs on school buses spouting so called educational content that turns out to be blatantly false. These novels also touch on brainwashing, with the nightly emails sent to parents that convince them to send their children away to reform camps from which they never return.

In contrast, After takes place during the reforms, showing how they were allowed to happen, while 1984 only shows the aftermath and its inevitability. The ending of After also shows the main character (Tom Bishop) escaping his town with his friends and family, a much lighter closing than 1984.

Described in the New York Times Book Review as a "rich parable", this novel questions the line that must be drawn when freedom is more important than safety.
