= The Delicate Prey =

- Short story by Paul Bowles
- Language: English

Publication
- Published in: Zero
- Publication date: Summer 1949

"The Delicate Prey" is a piece of short fiction by Paul Bowles. It was written in 1949 and first published in Paris in the summer 1949 issue of the small literary journal Zero. In 1950, Random House presented the story in the collection of Bowles's short fiction, The Delicate Prey and Other Stories. This short story is considered one of Bowles' most outstanding and controversial works of fiction.

"The Delicate Prey" was declined for inclusion by the British John Lehmann publishers in its collection of Bowles's works A Little Stone in 1950. It would not be printed in Britain until 1968 due to censorship issues.

== Plot ==
Two brothers of the Filala commune, both leather merchants in Tabelbala Algeria, travel on business to the city of Tessalit, accompanied by their young nephew, Driss. The journey takes them though a remote mountain region historically roamed by the Reguibat, regarded as bandits. En route, they encounter a lone traveler who identifies himself as a Moungari, a resident of Moungar, a village that boasts a ruined holy shrine. The brothers allow him to join them, but Driss is suspicious.

On the pretext of going to hunt gazelle near the campsite, the Moungari lures the brothers into an ambush, killing them. He returns to the camp and brutally mutilates and rapes the boy Driss. When the Moungari attempts to sell their camels and merchandise in Tessalit, his crime is discovered. The French colonial officials hand the murderer over to the Filala who arrange a fate far worse than summary execution.

== Publishing history ==
"Playwright Tennessee Williams on "The Delicate Prey": "I recognised it as a beautiful piece of prose but advised Bowles against its publication in the States. You see, my own shocking stories had been published in expensive private editions by New Directions and never exhibited on a bookstore counter." Williams cautioned Bowles "if you publish it, you're mad." — Colm Tóibín in The London Review of Books (2007)

The story for 'The Delicate Prey' had its origins in an actual incident described to Bowles by a "French captain" in the winter of 1947–1948 at Timimoun, Algeria. The outlines of the event, including Filala leather merchants, their murder by a bandit and his capture and execution with the approval of French authorities, all appear in the short work of fiction. Bowles admitted to embellishing the story: "I hoked it up considerably."

Bowles wrote 'The Delicate Prey" while on board the SS Vulcania in December 1948 en route to Tangiers. According to Bowles, when playwright Tennessee Williams previewed the work on the SS Vulcania, he strenuously urged him not to publish it: "You mustn't publish it. Don't publish that…everyone will think you're a monster, and it will do you irreparable harm..."

Bowles opted to submit "The Delicate Prey" for publication in the Paris Zero in 1949, a journal that had a very limited circulation. The story appeared as part of collection of Bowles's short fiction in 1950, The Delicate Prey and Other Stories by Random House.

The story did not appear in any British publication until 1968 due to "censorship concerns."

== Critical assessment ==
The shocking act of gratuitous violence that marks the climax of the story earned Bowles the epithet "the pornographer of terror" and "a secret lover of the horror he evokes" by literary critic Leslie A. Fiedler in The Kenyon Review. Biographer Allen Hibbard writes:

...at its most basic level, castration (penectomy) invokes our fears of vulnerability, of having our most personal, productive potential violently and irrationally ripped from us."

When "The Delicate Prey" appeared in the Random House The Delicate Prey and Other Stories in 1950, Alice B. Toklas informed Bowles that, though approving his literary style, she considered the work "not to my taste." Playwright Tennessee Williams remarked: "It wasn't the Arabs I was afraid of while I was in Tangier; it was Paul Bowles, whose chilling stories filled me with horror."

== Sources ==
- Hibbard, Allen. 1993. Paul Bowles: A Study of the Short Fiction. Twayne Publishers. New York. ISBN 0-8057-8318-0
- Prose, Francine. 2002. The Coldest Eye: acting badly among the Arabs. Harper's Magazine. March, 2002. https://harpers.org/archive/2002/03/the-coldest-eye/ Retrieved 10 July 2022.
- Tóibín, Colm. 2007. Avoid the Orient. Review, Paul Bowles: A Life, by Virginia Spencer Carr. London Review of Books, Vol. 29 No. 1, 4 January 2007. https://www.lrb.co.uk/the-paper/v29/n01/colm-toibin/avoid-the-orient Retrieved 11 July 2022.
- Vidal, Gore. 1979. Introduction to Paul Bowles; Collected Stories, 1939-1976. Black Sparrow Press. Santa Rosa. 2001. ISBN 0876853963
