= Lee Marvin: A Personal Portrait by John Boorman =

- Directed by: John Boorman
- Produced by: Paula Jalfon; Steve Jenkins; Colin MacCabe; David Sehring
- Edited by: Ron Davis; James Finlan
- Music by: Richie Buckley
- Production companies: American Movie Classics; BBC; British Film Institute; Department of Film & Television TAU; The Museum of Modern Art
- Distributed by: BBC
- Release dates: October 1998 (Chicago International Film Festival); 17 November 1998 (BBC)
- Running time: 50 minutes
- Countries: United States; United Kingdom
- Language: English

Lee Marvin: A Personal Portrait by John Boorman is a British-American documentary film directed by English filmmaker John Boorman about American actor Lee Marvin (1924-1987).

== Synopsis ==
English filmmaker John Boorman, who directed Lee Marvin in Point Blank (1967) and Hell in the Pacific (1968), embarks on a quest to understand the man who had such a profound effect on his own life and work.

== Cast ==
- John Boorman - presenter
- Lee Marvin - (archive footage)
- Robert Filkosky
- William Hurt
- Jim Jarmusch
- Pamela Marvin - Lee Marvin's wife
- Harry Wilmer
- Jess King
- Robert James Raymond

== Release ==
The film premiered at the Chicago International Film Festival in October 1998. It was then broadcast on the BBC on 17 November 1998.
