= When Pigs Fly (film) =

- Directed by: Sara Driver
- Written by: Ray Dobbins
- Story by: Sara Driver; Ray Dobbins
- Produced by: Kees Kasander
- Starring: Alfred Molina
- Cinematography: Robby Müller
- Edited by: Jay Rabinowitz
- Music by: Joe Strummer
- Release date: September 12, 1993 (Toronto)
- Running time: 94 minutes
- Countries: Germany; United States; Netherlands
- Language: English

When Pigs Fly is a 1993 German-American-Dutch comedy film directed by Sara Driver and starring Alfred Molina.

== Cast ==
- Alfred Molina as Marty
- Marianne Faithfull as Lilly
- Maggie O'Neill as Sheila
- Seymour Cassel as Frank
- Rachael Bella as Ruthie
- Megan Follows as Kathleen
