= Jennifer jazz =

- Occupations: Writer, musician, performance artist

jennifer jazz is a New York writer, musician and performance artist closely associated with the eighties East Village art scene. She was the lead singer and drummer for punk group the Guerilla Girls as well as Pleasure, an early electronica, dub and free jazz influenced band that featured Felice Rosser, Danny Hamilton, Richard Cleves, Martin Wheeler, Jemeel Moondoc and Daniel Carter.

jazz's writing has appeared in Moko, Sukoon, Booth, Warscapes, A Gathering of the Tribes, Sensitive Skin, Afropunk, Black Silk: A Collection of African-American Erotica, and make/shift magazine. She has received awards for unpublished fiction from the Barbara Deming Fund for feminists in the arts, the Bronx Council on the Arts and Fine Arts Work Center. jazz has performed mixed media shows at venues that include Wow Cafe Theater, The Nuyorican Poet's Cafe, The Kitchen, Dixon Place and Bandini Espacio Cultural gallery in Mexico City. In 1996, she played the role of Virginia in the film Rescuing Desire. Her own short film Je m'ennuie was part of the UAMO Festival 2010 in Munich. jazz is featured in Sara Driver's 2018 documentary Boom for Real: The Late Teenage Years of Jean-Michel Basquiat. jazz's memoir Spill Ink On It, was published by Spuyten-Duyvil Press in November 2019.
