= Sleepwalk (film) =

- Directed by: Sara Driver
- Written by: Kathleen Brennan; Sara Driver; Lorenzo Mans
- Produced by: Kathleen Brennan; Sara Driver
- Starring: Suzanne Fletcher
- Cinematography: Jim Jarmusch; Frank Prinzi
- Edited by: Li Shin-Yu
- Music by: Phil Kline
- Distributed by: First Run Features
- Release date: May 1986 (Cannes)
- Running time: 78 minutes
- Country: United States
- Language: English

Sleepwalk is a 1986 American fantasy drama film directed by Sara Driver and starring Suzanne Fletcher. It is Driver's directorial debut. Jim Jarmusch served as one of the two cinematographers of the film.

== Plot ==
In an apartment, a bound mysterious Chinese text hangs in an altar. An unidentified woman opens the altar, removes the first page of the text, rolls it up and leaves with it. Another figure, this time an African American man, enters and does the same thing, again leaving the rest of bound text behind in the shadowy apartment.

Nicole, a casually dressed young woman, works as a Chinese language translator at a small production company of some kind with a grumpy middle aged boss who also mans the phones and acts as a receptionist. She enters characters in to a typesetting device as a handful of her co-workers are seen grappling with other forms of technology as part of their jobs. Nicole’s friend and roommate, Isabelle arrives and engages in banter with Nicole and the proprietor. Isabelle is an illegal immigrant who lights up only when opportunities arise for her to be gifted money.

A pair of men appear and hire Nicole to translate the text, pouring cash on Nicole's desk. One of them appears to be the black man appearing in the original scene. His fingers seem to be missing. Bad luck seems to befall the two women which seems to be linked to the Chinese text which Nicole has been asked to translate as a free lance job after hours. She finds that the manuscript seems to have powers that, little by little, take over her life.

Isabelle and Nicole arrive home and interact with Nicole’s distant son Jimmie. Nicole notices a few strands of Isabelle’s hairs left behind.

The next day an Asian lady arrives and pays Nicole to translate yet more text. This time the boss takes the cash and agrees that Nicole will not work on the text in a freelance capacity. Nicole and the woman agree to meet her later on a rooftop. The lady, when asked, tells Nicole her name is Ecco Ecco. Later Nicole is seen waiting for the meeting.

The next day two cops with Ecco Ecco’s receipt from the previous day enter the workplace and explain to the boss that the woman has been killed and her fingers were mysteriously dismembered. Nicole suspiciously listens from afar.

That night when Nicole leaves her workplace alone there is a menacing atmosphere on the elevator and in the building. She passes the two men who dropped off the first text who inhabit one of the floors of the building. When she finally arrives home, Isabelle is crying because her hair has completely fallen out. Nicole offers Isabelle money if she will take her son to Atlantic City where she can gamble and Jimmy will go to the beach.

On the way to the beach, with Jimmy asleep in the back seat, Isabelle gets out of the car and a thief steals the vehicle, unaware the child is there. Isabelle returns home, tells Nicole her son is missing and the two sit speechless together until Nicole leaves and is seen desperately calling out the boy’s name.

When the thief delivers the stolen car to his partner, she sees the kid and refuses to accept the car and sends them away. The thief kidnaps and blindfolds the boy and eventually takes him to sit on a wall at the beach and leaves. Jimmy sits alone blindfolded, unaware that Nicole is asleep on the same wall nearby.

== Cast ==
- Suzanne Fletcher as Nicole
- Ann Magnuson as Isabelle
- Dexter Lee as Jimmy
- Stephen Chen as Dr. Gou
- Tony Todd as Barrington Rutley the third
- Richard Boes as The Thief
- Ako as Ecco Ecco
- Harvey Perr as Matt
- Jim Stark as Detective
- Joe Dell'Olio as Policeman
- Rebecca Wright as Fence
- Steve Buscemi as Worker

== Production ==
According to Driver, filming began during the summer of 1985 and ended in 1986. In a 2012 interview with The Huffington Post, Driver confirmed, "I was influenced by Jacques Rivette’s films, and Tarkovsky’s. Their magical realism was a big influence on Sleepwalk."

== Reception ==
Caryn James of The New York Times wrote in her review, "Although Sleepwalk moves slowly, Ms. Driver keeps her images from becoming static or self-consciously artsy."
