= Permanent Vacation (1980 film) =

1980 American drama film

- Directed by: Jim Jarmusch
- Written by: Jim Jarmusch
- Produced by: Jim Jarmusch
- Starring: Chris Parker; John Lurie; Eric Mitchell; Sara Driver
- Cinematography: Tom DiCillo; James A. Lebovitz
- Edited by: Jim Jarmusch
- Music by: Jim Jarmusch; John Lurie
- Distributed by: Cinesthesia
- Release date: March 6, 1981 (U.S.)
- Running time: 75 minutes
- Country: United States
- Language: English
- Budget: US$12,000

Permanent Vacation is a 1980 No Wave film directed, written and produced by Jim Jarmusch. It was the director's first release, shot on 16 mm film shortly after he left film school. Jarmusch came to New York City from Akron, Ohio to study at Columbia University and NYU's film school.

Music by John Lurie, Earl Bostic and Jim Jarmusch. Sound by Kevin Dowd and Virgil Moorefield. Cinematography by Tom DiCillo.

== Premise ==
In downtown Manhattan, a twenty-something troubled hipster named Allie (Chris Parker), whose Father is gone and whose Mother is institutionalized, is a big Charlie Parker fan. He aimlessly wanders around the dingy Downtown of New York City and is confronted by a number of intriguing characters as he ponders the questions of life and searches for a better place—always keeping just ahead of whatever it is that seems to be chasing him.

== Cast ==
- Chris Parker (Allie)
- Richard Boes (War vet)
- Ruth Bolton (Mother)
- Sara Driver (Nurse)
- María Duval (Latin girl)
- Frankie Faison (Man in lobby)
- Jane Fire (Nurse)
- Suzanne Fletcher (Girl in car)
- Leila Gastil (Leila)
- Chris Hameon (French traveller)
- John Lurie (Sax player)
- Eric Mitchell (Car fence)
- Lisa Rosen (Popcorn girl)
- Felice Rosser (Woman by mailbox)
- Evelyn Smith (Patient)
- Charlie Spademan (Patient)

== Reception ==
It currently receives a weighted average score of 69 out of 100 on Metacritic based on 4 critic reviews, indicating "generally favorable reviews".

Vincent Canby proclaimed this film as a "must-see for anyone who shares the belief that Mr. Jarmusch is the most arresting and original American film maker to come out of the 1980s". Eric Eidelstein of IndieWire called it "a touching vision of what it was like to be head over heels with art, love, and oneself in late 1970s New York".

== Soundtrack ==
- Up There in Orbit - Written and performed by Earl Bostic
- My Boyfriend's Back - Written by Bob Feldman, Jerry Goldstein, and Richard Gottehrer, performed by The Angels
- Sally, Go 'Round the Roses - Written by Zell Sanders and Abner Spector, performed by The Jaynetts

== Availability ==
The film was released by the Criterion Collection as a special feature on the DVD for Jarmusch's Stranger than Paradise on September 4, 2007.

The film was released on DVD and Blu-ray formats in the United Kingdom via Soda Pictures on March 23, 2015.

== References in culture ==
- A frame from the film was used on the cover of Velvet Rye's EP "Revol".
