= Stranger Than Paradise =

1984 film directed by Jim Jarmusch

- 1984 movie poster
- Directed by: Jim Jarmusch
- Written by: Jim Jarmusch; John Lurie
- Produced by: Sara Driver
- Starring: John Lurie; Eszter Balint; Richard Edson; Cecillia Stark
- Cinematography: Tom DiCillo
- Edited by: Jim Jarmusch; Melody London
- Music by: John Lurie
- Production company: Cinesthesia Productions Inc.
- Distributed by: The Samuel Goldwyn Company
- Release date: October 1, 1984
- Running time: 89 minutes
- Country: United States
- Languages: English; Hungarian
- Budget: US$100,000
- Box office: $2,436,000

Stranger Than Paradise is a 1984 American black-and-white absurdist deadpan comedy film directed, co-written and co-edited by Jim Jarmusch, and starring jazz musician John Lurie, former Sonic Youth drummer-turned-actor Richard Edson, and Hungarian-born actress and violinist Eszter Balint. It features a minimalist plot in which the main character, Willie, is visited by Eva, his cousin from Hungary. Eva stays with him for ten days before going to Cleveland. Willie and his friend Eddie go to Cleveland to visit her, and the three then take a trip to Florida. The film is shot entirely in single long takes with no standard coverage.

== Plot ==
The film is a three-act story about Bela "Willie" Molnar, who lives in Brooklyn, and his interactions with the two other main characters, his cousin Eva and friend Eddie.

In the first act, Willie, a surly small-time gambler and hustler of Hungarian origin, receives a phone call from his Aunt Lotte in Cleveland informing him that his expected visit by his cousin Eva, who is coming from Hungary to live with Lotte, will have to be extended to ten days because Lotte is unexpectedly in the hospital. Willie makes it clear that he does not want Eva there. When Eva arrives, he orders her to speak English rather than Hungarian, as Willie strongly identifies as "American". He grudgingly begins to enjoy her company. He becomes protective, discouraging her from going out alone, or beyond certain streets. At one point, Eva takes the initiative to clean the apartment, which is fairly dirty. When she finds his vacuum cleaner, Willie playfully tries to persuade her that an American expression for vacuuming is "choking the alligator", but Eva doesn't believe him.

Despite his growing fondness for Eva, Willie refuses to take her on his trips to the racetrack with Eddie, his good-natured friend and hustling accomplice. Eddie fruitlessly tries to persuade him to bring Eva along. Willie and Eva watch football in the afternoon and late-night sci-fi movies. His esteem for her increases when she returns from an excursion with a few canned food items, a TV dinner "especially" for him, and, to his astonishment, a carton of cigarettes, all obtained without money. He smiles and shakes her hand, telling her "I think you're alright, kid."

Eva, smart, pretty, and low-key, likes to play her favorite song, Screamin' Jay Hawkins's "I Put a Spell on You", which Willie dislikes. He buys her a dress, which she dislikes. At this point it becomes evident that Willie has grown attached to Eva. When the ten days have passed, Eva leaves, and Willie is clearly upset to see her go. Eddie, on his way to visit Willie, sees her discard the dress on the street, but doesn't tell Willie.

The second act starts a year later and opens with Willie and Eddie winning a large amount of money by cheating at poker. Willie asks Eddie about borrowing his brother-in-law's car, telling him "I just wanna get out'a here, see somethin' different, ya know?". He actually wants to go to Cleveland to see Eva.

It is the middle of winter. When they arrive in Cleveland, they stop at Lotte's house, then go to surprise Eva at her job at a local fast-food restaurant, where she is excited and pleased to see them. However, they are soon just as bored as they were in New York. They pass the time by playing cards with Lotte and tagging along with Eva and her would-be boyfriend to the movies. They go to the pier on the frozen snow-covered lakefront to take in the view. Pressed by Eddie, Willie eventually decides to return to New York. When they say their goodbyes, Eva jokingly suggests that if they win big at the racetrack, they should "kidnap" her. Willie responds that they would take her someplace warm, because "this place is awful".

The final act begins with Willie suggesting to Eddie, on the road back to New York, that they should go to Florida instead. He then suggests they turn around and pick up Eva—which they do, to Lotte's obvious consternation. The three arrive in Florida and get a motel room. The next morning, the men leave Eva asleep in the room. Eva, awakening alone and with no food or cash, wanders outside in the windy bleak overcast afternoon to the beach, which appears not much more appealing than the windy bleak snowy Lake Erie scene in Cleveland from which they fled. When Willie and Eddie return, Eva's annoyance turns to dismay when the distraught pair reveal they have lost most of their money on dog races. They go for a walk on the beach to figure out what to do. Willie is clearly annoyed with Eddie, as the dog races were his idea.

Willie and Eddie decide to go out and bet the last of their money on horse races. Willie still refuses to let Eva come along, so she goes out on the beach for a walk, wearing a flamboyant wide-brimmed straw hat she has just gotten from a gift shop. A drug dealer mistakes her for a courier he has been waiting for and gives her an envelope with a large sum of money, while berating her and her presumed boss. She returns to the motel, leaves some of the money for Willie and Eddie, and writes them a note explaining that she is going to the airport. Willie and Eddie, having won big at the horse races and gone through the better part of a bottle of whisky, return to the motel to find Eva gone. Willie reads her note and they go to the airport to stop her. Eva discusses with an airline ticket agent her options for flying to Europe, and the agent mentions that a plane leaves in 44 minutes for her home city of Budapest. Eva is indecisive.

When Willie and Eddie reach the airport, Willie, believing Eva has boarded the Budapest flight, buys a ticket, planning to board the plane and convince Eva to stay. In the next-to-last shot, Eddie stands outside, watching the plane fly overhead, lamenting that Willie was apparently not able to get off the plane, and that both Willie and Eva are headed to Budapest. In the final shot, we see Eva returning to the empty motel room, looking tired and perplexed, toying with the straw hat.

== Cast ==
- John Lurie as Bela "Willie" Molnar
- Eszter Balint as Eva
- Richard Edson as Eddie
- Cecillia Stark as Aunt Lotte
- Danny Rosen as Billy
- Rammellzee as Man With Money
- Tom DiCillo as Airline Agent
- Richard Boes as Factory Worker
- Rockets Redglare, Harvey Perr and Brian J. Burchill as Poker Players
- Sara Driver as Girl With Hat
- Paul Sloane as Motel Owner

== Background and production ==
Writer and director Jim Jarmusch shot his first feature, Permanent Vacation (1980) as his final thesis at New York University's film school and spent the next four years making Stranger Than Paradise. At NYU, he studied under director Nicholas Ray, who had brought him along as his personal assistant for the production of Lightning over Water, a portrait of Ray being filmed by Wim Wenders. Wenders gave Jarmusch the remaining film stock from his subsequent film, The State of Things (1982), enabling the young director to shoot the 30-minute short that became Stranger Than Paradise. It was released as a standalone film in 1982, and shown as "Stranger Than Paradise" at the 1983 International Film Festival Rotterdam. When it was later expanded into a three-act feature, the name was appropriated for the feature itself, and the initial segment was renamed "The New World".

== Release and reception ==
The film was shown at the Cannes Film Festival, where it won the Caméra d'Or award for debut films (1984). It also won the Golden Leopard and the Prize of the Ecumenical Jury – Special Mention at the 1984 Locarno International Film Festival, the Grand Prix of the Belgian Film Critics Association, the Special Jury Prize at the Sundance Film Festival in 1985 and National Society of Film Critics Award for Best Picture of 1984. It went on to win the Kinema Junpo Award for best foreign-language film in 1987, and the award for National Film Registry at the National Film Preservation Board, USA in 2002.

The film earned $2,436,000, significantly more than its budget of around $100,000.

=== Critics ===
On the review aggregator website Rotten Tomatoes, 100% of 25 critics' reviews are positive, with an average rating of 8.0/10. The website's consensus reads: "A striking debut for director Jim Jarmusch, Stranger Than Paradise is an effortlessly cool exploration of finding meaning in the mundane." Metacritic, which uses a weighted average, assigned the film a score of 86 out of 100, based on 13 critics, indicating "universal acclaim".

Film critic Pauline Kael gave the film a generally positive review:

The first section is set in the bare Lower East Side apartment of Willie, who is forced to take in Eva, his 16-year-old cousin from Budapest, for ten days. The joke here is the basic joke of the whole movie. It's in what Willie doesn't do: he doesn't offer her food or drink, or ask her any questions about life in Hungary or her trip; he doesn't offer to show her the city, or even supply her with sheets for her bed. Then Eddie comes in, even further down on the lumpen scale. Willie bets on the horses; Eddie bets on dog races. Eva, who never gets to see more of New York than the drab, anonymous looking area where Willie lives, goes off to Cleveland to stay with Aunt Lotte and work at a hot-dog stand. And when Willie and Eddie go to see her, all they see is an icy wasteland – slums and desolation – and Eddie says 'You know it's funny. You come to someplace new, and everything looks just the same.' The film has something of the same bombed-out listlessness as Paul Morrissey's 1970 Trash – it's Trash without sex or transvestism. The images are so emptied out that Jarmusch makes you notice every tiny, grungy detail. And those black-outs have something of the effect of Samuel Beckett's pauses: they make us look more intently, as Beckett makes us listen more intently.

=== Home media ===
Stranger Than Paradise was released on DVD by The Criterion Collection as its 400th title. The DVD contains a second disc which includes Jarmusch's first film, Permanent Vacation (1980). Both films were restored for the DVD release using high-definition digital transfers overseen and sanctioned by the director. Supplementary footage on the second disc includes Kino '84: Jim Jarmusch, a series of interviews with the cast and crew from both films by a German television program, as well as Some Days in January (1984), a behind-the-scenes Super-8 film by the director's brother. An accompanying booklet features Jarmusch's 1984 essay "Some Notes on Stranger Than Paradise" as well as critical commentary by Geoff Andrew and J. Hoberman on Stranger Than Paradise and by Lucy Sante on Permanent Vacation.

== Legacy ==
Stranger Than Paradise broke many conventions of traditional Hollywood filmmaking and became a landmark in modern independent film. According to allmovie, it is "one of the most influential movies of the 1980s", and cast "a wide shadow over the new generation of independent American filmmakers to come." It is cited for giving "an early example of the low-budget independent wave that would dominate the cinematic marketplace a decade later". Its success accorded Jarmusch a certain iconic status within arthouse cinema as an idiosyncratic and uncompromising auteur exuding the aura of urban cool embodied by downtown Manhattan. In a 2005 profile of Jarmusch for The New York Times, critic Lynn Hirschberg declared the film had "permanently upended the idea of independent film as an intrinsically inaccessible avant-garde form".

In 2002, Stranger Than Paradise was selected for preservation in the United States National Film Registry by the Library of Congress as being "culturally, historically, or aesthetically significant". It was included in Jonathan Rosenbaum's Alternate 100, a response to the American Film Institute's 100 Years...100 Movies list. In 2003, Entertainment Weekly ranked it #26 on their list of "The Top 50 Cult Films". Empire ranked it #14 on its list of 50 Greatest Independent Films of All Time.

The Japanese filmmaker Akira Kurosawa cited Stranger Than Paradise as one of his favorite films.

== Soundtrack ==
Stranger Than Paradise

Soundtrack album by John Lurie
- Released: 1986
- Genre: Experimental music
- Length: 19:11
- Label: Enigma

John Lurie chronology
Stranger Than Paradise (1986)	Down By Law (1988)

Professional ratings
Review scores
Source	Rating
AllMusic	3/5 stars

The film features an original soundtrack written by John Lurie, who also stars in the film. It is performed by The Paradise Quartet, consisting of Jill B. Jaffe (viola), Mary L. Rowell (violin), Kay Stern (violin), and Eugene Moye (cello). The recording engineer was Ollie Cotton. The original song "I Put a Spell on You" by Screamin' Jay Hawkins is featured in the soundtrack.

=== Track listing ===
No.	Title	Length
1.	"Bella by Barlight"	3:21
2.	"Car Cleveland"	3:11
3.	"Sad Trees"	0:53
4.	"The Lamposts Are Mine"	1:51
5.	"Car Florida"	3:04
6.	"Eva & Willie's Room (Beer for Boys – Eva Packing)"	2:03
7.	"The Good and Happy Army"	3:19
8.	"A Woman Can Take You to Another Universe (Sometimes She Just Leaves You There)"	1:24
