= Sara Driver =

American actress and film director (born 1955)

- Born: Sara Miller Driver; December 15, 1955 (age 70); Westfield, New Jersey, U.S.
- Occupations: Filmmaker, actress
- Years active: 1980–present
- Partner: Jim Jarmusch

Sara Miller Driver (born December 15, 1955) is an American independent filmmaker and actress from Westfield, New Jersey. A participant in the independent film scene that flourished in Lower Manhattan from the late 1970s through the 1990s, she gained initial recognition as producer of two early films by Jim Jarmusch, Permanent Vacation (1980) and Stranger Than Paradise (1984). Driver has directed two feature films, Sleepwalk (1986) and When Pigs Fly (1993), as well as a notable short film, You Are Not I (1981), and a documentary, Boom for Real: The Late Teenage Years of Jean-Michel Basquiat (2017), on the young artist's pre-fame life in the burgeoning downtown New York arts scene before the city's massive changes through the 1980s. She served on the juries of various film festivals throughout the 2000s.

== Film career ==
Driver made her directorial debut in 1981 with You Are Not I, a short subject film based on a Paul Bowles story and co-written by Jim Jarmusch. The premise of the film is a young mentally disturbed woman named Ethel escapes from the asylum where she is treated until she is mistaken for one of the survivors of a deadly car accident she stumbled upon. Then she is taken to her sister's home. Shot in six days on a $12,000 budget, This film served as Driver's thesis film for her MFA from NYU. Driver had to rent an editing room overnight to be able to afford the editing for the film. it developed a following soon after a well-received premiere at the Public Theater, only to be pulled out of circulation when a warehouse fire destroyed the film's negative. Rarely seen, it was still championed by renowned critics and film journals like Jonathan Rosenbaum and Cahiers du Cinéma, which hailed You Are Not I as one of the best films of the 1980s. Considered 'lost' for many years, a print was later discovered among Bowles's belongings. Driver was awarded a preservation grant from Women in Film and Television. The restored film screened in the Master Works section of The New York Film Festival 2011.

Driver directed her first feature film, Sleepwalk in 1986. It was awarded the Prix Georges Sadoul (1986) by the Cinémathèque Française, the Special Prize at the 1986 International Filmfestival Mannheim-Heidelberg, and was the opening night selection for the 25th Anniversary of the International Critics' Week (1986) at the Cannes Film Festival. Sleepwalk was also featured at the Museum of Modern Art's 1987 New Directors/New Films Festival and the Sundance Film Festival (1987). The dim lighting in this film is inspired by an essay by Carl Theodore.

Driver directed the "Bed and Boar" episode of the TV series Monsters (1990). Her second feature film as a director, When Pigs Fly (1993), stars Marianne Faithfull and Alfred Molina and is scored by Joe Strummer. The film received the Best of Festival Feature award at the 1994 Long Island Film Festival. When Pigs Fly premiered in competition at the Locarno Film Festival, and played a limited engagement at the Lighthouse Cinema on Suffolk Street in New York in 1996.

Driver also wrote and directed the short documentary, The Bowery - Spring, 1994, part of Postcards from New York, an anthology program for French TV. Driver has producer and production credits for many films of Jim Jarmusch, as well as minor roles in three of his films.

Driver's theater work includes the play What the Hell - Zelda Sayre (1977, writer, director); the experimental musical Jazz Passengers in Egypt (1990, director), performed at La Mama, NYC; as well as the play Stairway to Heaven (1994, director), at the Cucaracha Theatre, NYC.

Driver was a juror at the Buenos Aires International Festival of Independent Cinema (2004) where a retrospective of her films took place. She was also a juror at the Miami International Film Festival (2005), San Sebastián Film Festival (2006), Bahamas International Film Festival (2006), and director Emir Kusturica's Küstendorf Film and Music Festival (2010).

Driver directed Boom for Real: The Late Teenage Years of Jean‑Michel Basquiat (2017). This film is put together using archival footage and interviews with those who were close to the late artist. It has an approval rating of 88% on Rotten Tomatoes.

In 2021 Driver wrote and acted in a short called Stranger Than Rotterdam with Sara Driver. The short was awarded A Short Film Special Jury Award: Screenwriting at the 2022 Sundance Film Festival.

Driver has been described as an "often overlooked linchpin of the downtown New York independent film scene." Film critic Lucy Sante describes Driver's movies as "doorways into the unknown." Rosenbaum wrote that Driver's films "belong to what the French call le fantastique— a conflation of fantasy with surrealism, science fiction, comics, horror, sword-and-sorcery, and the supernatural that stretches all the way from art cinema to exploitation by way of Hollywood."

The moving image collection of Sara Driver is held at the Academy Film Archive.

== Personal life and education ==
Driver was born in Westfield, New Jersey, the daughter of Albert and Martha (Miller) Driver. She attended high school at Westfield High school in Westfield, New Jersey. She attended Randolph-Macon Woman's College in Lynchburg, Virginia, graduating with a degree in theatre and classics in 1977. She spent her junior year studying in Athens, and participated in a production by the National Opera of Greece.

Driver taught directing in NYU's Graduate Film School (1996–1998), where she received her Master of Fine Arts degree in 1982.

Driver attended NYU alongside Spike Lee and Jim Jarmusch.

== Filmography ==
| Year | Title | Role |
|---|---|---|
| 1980 | Permanent Vacation | Actor: Nurse, Production Manager, Assistant Director |
| 1981 | You Are Not I | Director, Writer, Producer |
| 1984 | Stranger Than Paradise | Actor: Girl with hat, Producer, Production Manager |
| 1986 | Sleepwalk (Year of the Dog) | Director, Writer, Producer |
| 1986 | Down by Law | Production Troubleshooter |
| 1989 | Mystery Train | Actor: Airport clerk |
| 1989 | Bloodhounds of Broadway | Actor: Yvette |
| 1990 | Monsters (episode "Bed and Boar") | Director |
| 1991 | Keep It for Yourself | Actor |
| 1991 | Night on Earth | (uncredited crew member) |
| 1993 | When Pigs Fly | Director, Writer |
| 1999 | Ghost Dog: The Way of the Samurai | Story Consultant |
| 2005 | Broken Flowers | On credits as 'idea inspired from' |
| 2013 | Only Lovers Left Alive | On credits as 'instigation and inspiration' |
| 2017 | Boom for Real: The Late Teenage Years of Jean-Michel Basquiat | Director |
| 2019 | The Dead Don't Die | Actor: Coffee Zombie |
| 2021 | Stranger Than Rotterdam with Sara Driver | Writer, Actor |
