= You Are Not I (film) =

- Directed by: Sara Driver
- Written by: Sara Driver; Jim Jarmusch
- Based on: "You Are Not I" by Paul Bowles
- Produced by: Sara Driver; Jim Jarmusch
- Starring: Suzanne Fletcher; Evelyn Smith; Lucy Sante; Nan Goldin
- Cinematography: Jim Jarmusch
- Edited by: Sara Driver
- Music by: Phil Kline
- Release date: 1981
- Running time: 48 minutes
- Country: United States
- Language: English
- Budget: $12,000

You Are Not I is a 1981 American drama film directed by Sara Driver and starring Suzanne Fletcher, Evelyn Smith, Nan Goldin, and Lucy Sante. The film is based on the 1948 short story of the same name by Paul Bowles.

== Summary ==
Adapted from a Paul Bowles story, a young mentally disturbed woman named Ethel (Fletcher) escapes from the asylum where she is treated until she is mistaken for one of the survivors of a deadly car accident she stumbled upon. Then she is taken to her sister's home.

== Production ==
The film was shot in six days for $12,000 as a thesis film for New York University.

It played widely at international film festivals, but a leak at a New Jersey warehouse destroyed the negative leaving Driver with a battered unprojectable copy. It was thought to have been lost, until a print was found at the holdings of Bowles. It has since been released on the DVD set "Driver X4: The Lost and Found Films of Sara Driver".
