= Virginia Spencer Carr =

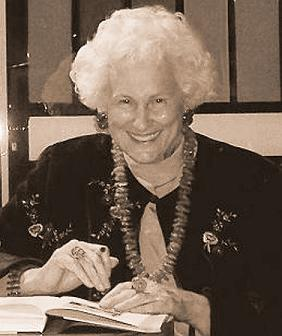
- Born: July 21, 1929; West Palm Beach, Florida
- Died: April 10, 2012 (aged 82); Lynn, Massachusetts
- Occupation: Biographer
- Writing career
- Genres: Biography, Literary criticism
- Notable works: The Lonely Hunter: A Biography of Carson McCullers; "John Dos Passos: A Life;" and "Paul Bowles: A Life"

Virginia Spencer Carr (July 21, 1929 – April 10, 2012) was a biographer of Carson McCullers, John Dos Passos and Paul Bowles. Carr was also a college professor for more than 25 years at Columbus State University in Columbus, Georgia, and Georgia State University in Atlanta.

== Biography ==
Virginia Spencer Carr was born in West Palm Beach, Florida, on July 21, 1929. From the age of 12, she knew she wanted to someday be a writer.

Carr received her master's degree from the University of North Carolina at Chapel Hill and doctorate degree from Florida State University in 1969.

She was a professor of English at Columbus State University, until she agreed to chair the Department of English at Georgia State University in 1985. In 1993, she was named the John B. and Elena Diaz Verson Amos Distinguished Professor in English Letters, a position she held until her retirement in 2003. She died of liver disease at her home in Lynn, Massachusetts, on April 10, 2012.

A collection of papers documenting Carr's research and correspondence for her biography of Carson McCullers is housed at the Rubenstein Library at Duke University.

=== Tennessee Williams ===
Carr first met Tennessee Williams in the early 1970s when she was in the preparatory stages of writing her biography on Carson McCullers, The Lonely Hunter.

Over the years, Carr and Williams met many times to discuss McCullers as well as other literary luminaries of his social circle. As a result, a friendship ensued and Carr ultimately garnered the rights to write Williams' biography.

Williams said about his first meeting with Carr:

She had not told me what color hat or dress she’d be wearing or where she’d be seated, but despite my rather poor eyesight, I spotted her at once. Her face had a certain smile which gave it a certain charm and within a minute or two I had dismissed my reluctance to share with her my many reminiscences of Carson, for I knew at once that this lady from Georgia, Carson’s native state, was someone who valued the spirit and the writing of Mrs. McCullers as deeply as I did, and it seemed to me that the preparation of this biographical and critical work had been undertaken by Mrs. Carr much in the way that the devout once made pilgrimages to sanctified places. I pause here, for a moment, knowing that I will certainly be accused of romantic excess.

— Tennessee Williams' "Some Words Before," in The Lonely Hunter: A Biography of Carson McCullers, 1974.

=== Paul Bowles ===
In the last ten years of Paul Bowles' life, Carr formed a friendship with the reclusive, expatriate writer and composer, whom she had first met in Morocco in 1989 to interview him for a biography on Tennessee Williams that she was drafting (never completed).

During her visit with Bowles, she asked him to sign a copy of a recently published biography on him, An Invisible Spectator, which prompted Bowles to state: "Does this book have anything to do with me?" As a result of this comment, and the later suggestion by Gore Vidal to postpone her work on Williams' biography and instead write one on Bowles, Carr shifted gears and began work on what would become Paul Bowles: A Life.

Bowles agreed to offer Carr his no-strings-attached cooperation on the work. The result - after 12 years, and 13 trips to visit him in Morocco, and arrangements she made for his medical treatment in Atlanta - was that Bowles gave her in person and in letters tantalizing revelations about his life and the people with whom he had associated. It was understood by Carr that she could not publish any of this information until he had died.

She was able to read aloud to Bowles her completed work shortly before he died in 1999.

== Awards, honors and distinctions ==
- Pulitzer Prize finalists for both The Lonely Hunter: A Biography of Carson McCullers and Dos Passos: A Life
- Senior Fulbright professor in Poland (1980–81)
- Southern Historical Association’s Francis Butler Simkins Prize (The Lonely Hunter: A Biography of Carson McCullers)
- Council of Authors and Journalist Nonfiction Prize (Dos Passos: A Life)
- John B. and Elena Diaz Verson Amos Distinguished Professor Emerita of English Letters at Georgia State University (1993–2003)
- South Atlantic Modern Language Association’s John Hurt Fisher Award (2004)
- Melon Fellowship recipient awarded by the Harry Ransom Humanities Research Center of the University of Texas at Austin
- Stanley J. Kahrl Fellowship awarded by Harvard University
- Georgia Governor's Award in the Humanities
- South Atlantic Modern Language Association's Honorary Member Award (2011)

== Selected works ==
=== Biographies ===
- A Lonely Hunter: A Biography of Carson McCullers with a foreword by Tennessee Williams (University of Georgia Press, reprinted 2003)
- Dos Passos: A Life (New York: Doubleday, 1984)
- Paul Bowles: A Life (New York: Scribner, 2004; London: Peter Owen Publishers, 2005)

=== Other works ===
- Flowering Judas: Katherine Anne Porter (Women Writers: Text and Context), Editor (Rutgers University Press, 1993)
- Understanding Carson McCullers (University of South Carolina Press, reprinted 2005)
