= Francine Prose =

American writer (born 1947)

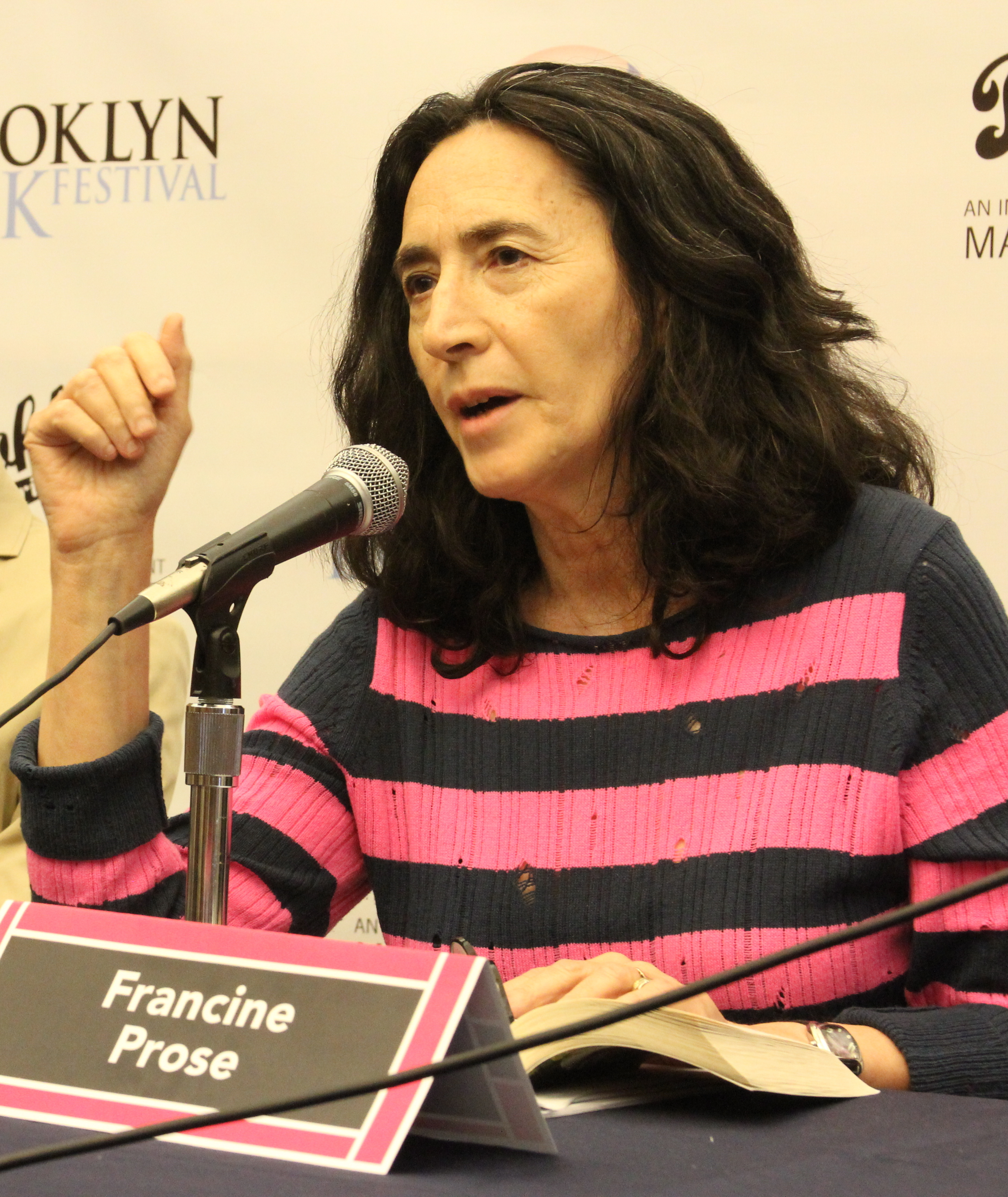
- Prose at the 2012 Brooklyn Book Festival
- Born: 1947 (age 78–79); New York City, U.S.
- Education: Radcliffe College
- Occupation: Writer
- Writing career
- Genres: Novels, short stories, nonfiction

Francine Prose is an American novelist, short story writer, essayist, and critic. She is writer-in-residence at Bard College and is a former president of PEN American Center.

== Life and career ==
Francine Prose was born in Brooklyn, New York City, United States, in 1947. She is the daughter of Philip Prose, a professor of pathology, and Jessie Rubin, a dermatologist. Francine Prose graduated from Radcliffe College in 1968. She married cartoonist Larry Gonick on December 29 1967 and had separated from him by 1974. She is married to her second husband, Howie Michaels, a sculptor.

Her first novel, Judah the Pious, received the Jewish Council Book Award in 1973. She received the PEN Translation Prize in 1988 and a Guggenheim Fellowship in 1991. Prose's second novel, The Glorious Ones, has been adapted into a musical with the same title by Lynn Ahrens and Stephen Flaherty. It ran at the Mitzi E. Newhouse Theater at Lincoln Center in New York City in the fall of 2007.

In March 2007, Prose was chosen to succeed American writer Ron Chernow to serve a one-year term as president of PEN American Center, a New York City-based society of writers, editors and translators that works to advance literature, defend free expression, and foster international literary fellowship. In March 2008, Prose ran unopposed for a second one-year term. That same month, London artist Sebastian Horsley had been denied entry into the United States and Prose subsequently invited Horsley to speak at PEN's annual festival of international literature in New York at the end of April 2008. She was succeeded as president of PEN by philosopher and novelist Kwame Anthony Appiah in April 2009.

Prose sat on the board of judges for the PEN/Newman's Own First Amendment Award. Her novel Blue Angel, a satire about sexual harassment on college campuses, was a finalist for the National Book Award. Nancy Savoca adapted her novel Household Saints into a movie.

Prose received the Rome Prize in 2006.

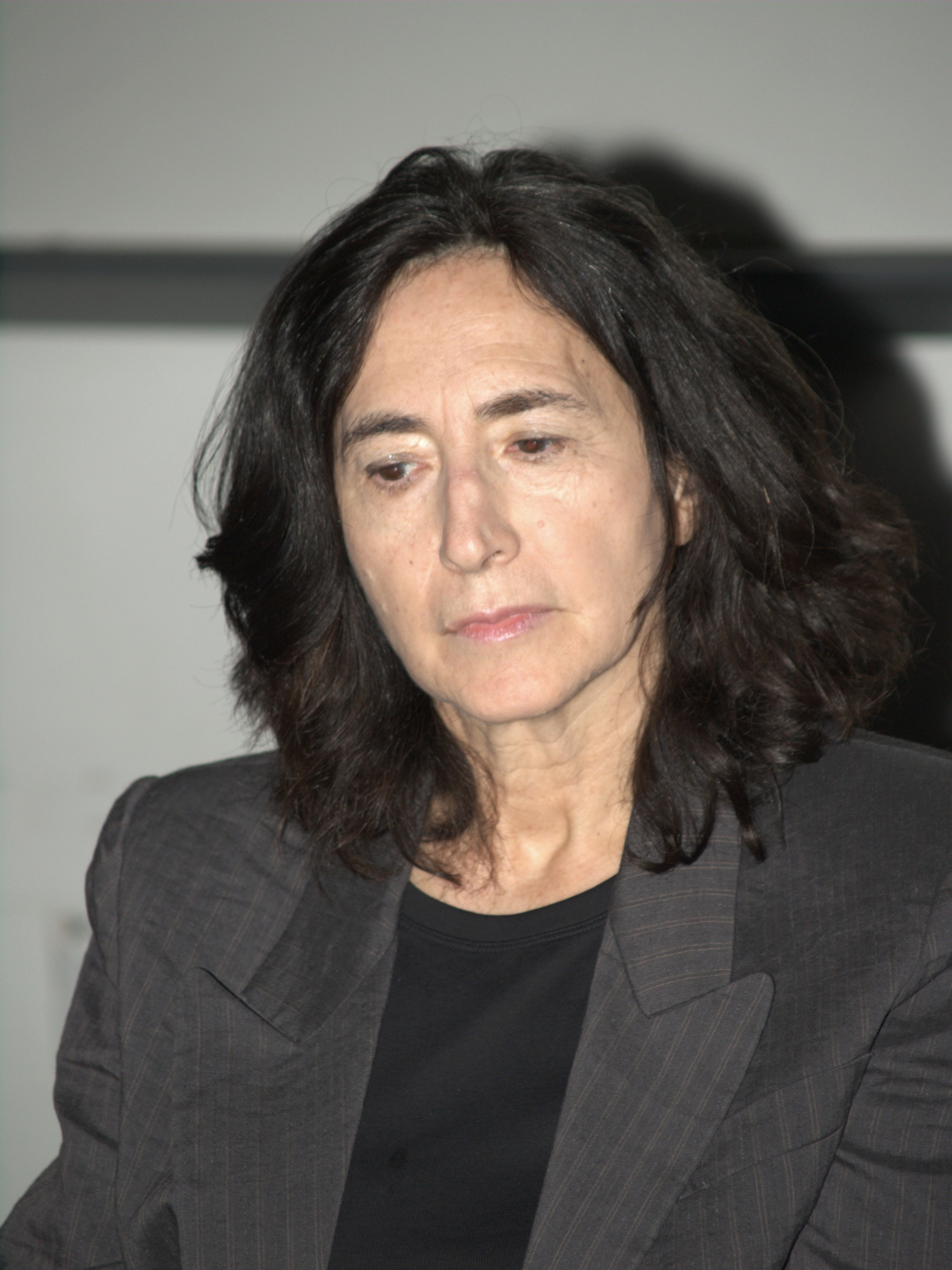
Prose at the 2010 Brooklyn Book Festival

In 2010, she received the Washington University International Humanities Medal. The medal, awarded biennially and accompanied by a cash prize of $25,000, is given to honor a person whose humanistic endeavors in scholarship, journalism, literature, or the arts have made a difference in the world.

=== American PEN criticism ===
In 2015 a terrorist attack at the office of the French humor and satire weekly Charlie Hebdo, intended to punish the journal for publishing cartoons about the prophet Muhammad, killed 17 people, including contributors, staff and security personnel. In solidarity American PEN chose to honor the journal with its annual Freedom of Expression Courage Award. Prose, alongside Michael Ondaatje, Teju Cole, Peter Carey, Rachel Kushner and Taiye Selasi, withdrew from the group's annual awards gala and signed a letter dissociating themselves from the award, stating that although the murders were "sickening and tragic", they did not believe that Charlie Hebdo's work deserved an award. The letter was soon co-signed by more than 140 other PEN members. Prose published an article in The Guardian justifying her position, stating that: "the narrative of the Charlie Hebdo murders—white Europeans killed in their offices by Muslim extremists—is one that feeds neatly into the cultural prejudices that have allowed our government to make so many disastrous mistakes in the Middle East." Prose was criticized for her views by Katha Pollitt, Alex Massie, Michael C. Moynihan, Nick Cohen and others, most notably by Salman Rushdie, who in a letter to PEN described Prose and the five other authors who withdrew as fellow travellers of "fanatical Islam, which is highly organised, well funded, and which seeks to terrify us all, Muslims as well as non-Muslims, into a cowed silence".

=== The New Yorker controversy ===
On January 7, 2018, in a Facebook post, Prose accused the author Sadia Shepard of plagiarizing Mavis Gallant's short story "The Ice Wagon Going Down the Street", which had appeared in The New Yorker on December 14, 1963. Shepard's story had been published online by The New Yorker and was scheduled for release in the January 8, 2018 issue. Though Shepard's story reimagines the original in a new context, with added detail and altered character dynamics, Prose contended that the similarities between the two stories constituted theft, writing in her original post that the story is a "scene by scene, plot-turn by plot-turn, gesture by gesture, line-of-dialogue by line-of-dialogue copy—the only major difference being that the main characters are Pakistanis in Connecticut during the Trump era instead of Canadians in post-WWII Geneva." In a letter to The New Yorker, Prose maintained her original stance, asking, "Is it really acceptable to change the names and the identities of fictional characters and then claim the story as one's own original work? Why, then, do we bother with copyrights?" Responding to Prose's accusation, Shepard acknowledged her debt to Gallant but maintained that her use of Gallant's story of expatriates in postwar Europe to explore the immigrant experience of Pakistani Muslims in contemporary America was justified.

== Bibliography ==
=== Novels ===
- 1973: Judah the Pious, Atheneum (Macmillan reissue 1986 ISBN 0-8398-2913-2)
- 1974: The Glorious Ones, Atheneum (Harper Perennial reissue 2007 ISBN 0-06-149384-8)
- 1977: Marie Laveau, Berkley Publishing Corp. (ISBN 0-399-11873-X)
- 1978: Animal Magnetism, G.P. Putnam's Sons. (ISBN 0-399-12160-9)
- 1981: Household Saints, St. Martin's Press (ISBN 0-312-39341-5)
- 1983: Hungry Hearts, Pantheon (ISBN 0-394-52767-4)
- 1986: Bigfoot Dreams, Pantheon (ISBN 0-8050-4860-X)
- 1992: Primitive People, Farrar, Straus & Giroux (ISBN 0-374-23722-0)
- 1995: Hunters and Gatherers, Farrar, Straus & Giroux (ISBN 978-0-374-17371-5)
- 2000: Blue Angel, Harper Perennial (ISBN 978-0-06-095371-3)
- 2003: After, HarperCollins (ISBN 0-06-008082-5)
- 2005: A Changed Man, HarperCollins (ISBN 0-06-019674-2) – winner of the 2006 Dayton Literary Peace Prize for fiction
- 2007: Bullyville, HarperTeen (ISBN 978-0-06-057497-0)
- 2008: Goldengrove, HarperCollins (ISBN 0-06-621411-4)
- 2009: Touch, HarperTeen (ISBN 978-0-06-137517-0)
- 2011: My New American Life, Harper (ISBN 978-0-06-171376-7)
- 2012: The Turning, HarperTeen (ISBN 978-0-06-199966-6)
- 2014: Lovers at the Chameleon Club, Paris 1932, Harper (ISBN 978-0-06-171378-1)
- 2016: Mister Monkey, Harper, (ISBN 978-0-06-239783-6)
- 2021: The Vixen, Harper (ISBN 978-0-06-301214-1)
- 2026: Five Weeks in the Country, Harper (ISBN 978-0-06-341181-4)

=== Short story collections ===
- 1988: Women and Children First, Pantheon (ISBN 0-394-56573-8)
- 1997: Guided Tours of Hell, Metropolitan (ISBN 0-8050-4861-8)
- 1998: The Peaceable Kingdom, Farrar Straus & Giroux (ISBN 0-06-075404-4)

=== Children's picture books ===
- 2005: Leopold, the Liar of Leipzig, illustrated by Einav Aviram, HarperCollins (ISBN 0-06-008075-2), OCLC 52821480

=== Nonfiction ===
- 2002: The Lives of the Muses: Nine Women and the Artists They Inspired, HarperCollins (ISBN 0-06-019672-6)
- 2003: Gluttony, Oxford University Press (ISBN 0-19-515699-4) – second in a series about the seven deadly sins
- 2003: Sicilian Odyssey, National Geographic (ISBN 0-7922-6535-1)
- 2005: Caravaggio: Painter of Miracles, Eminent Lives (ISBN 0-06-057560-3)
- 2006: Reading Like a Writer, HarperCollins (ISBN 0-06-077704-4)
- 2008: The Photographs of Marion Post Wolcott. Washington, DC: Library of Congress (ISBN 978-1-904832-41-6)
- 2009: Anne Frank: The Book, the Life, the Afterlife, HarperCollins (ISBN 0-06-143079-X)
- 2015: Peggy Guggenheim – The Shock of the Modern, Yale University Press (ISBN 978-0-300-20348-6)
- 2020: Titian's Pietro Aretino (with Xavier F. Salomon), The Frick Collection (ISBN 978-1-911282-71-6)
- 2022: Cleopatra: Her History, Her Myth, Yale University Press

=== Book reviews ===
- March 13, 2005: "'The Glass Castle': Outrageous Misfortune": The Glass Castle, by Jeannette Walls
- May 22, 2005: "'Oh the Glory of It All': Poor Little Rich Boy": Oh the Glory of It All, by Sean Wilsey
- June 12, 2005: "'Marriage, a History': Lithuanians and Letts Do It", Marriage, a History: From Obedience to Intimacy, Or How Love Conquered Marriage, by Stephanie Coontz
- December 4, 2005: "Slayer of Taboos", The New York Times: D. H. Lawrence: The Life of an Outsider, by John Worthen
- April 2, 2006: "Science Fiction", The New York Times: The Book About Blanche and Marie, by Per Olov Enquist
- July 9, 2006: "The Folklore of Exile", The New York Times: Last Evenings on Earth, by Roberto Bolaño
- December 2008: "More is More: Roberto Bolaño's Magnum Opus", Harper's Magazine: 2666, by Roberto Bolaño
- December/January 2010: "Altar Ego", Bookforum: Ayn Rand and the World She Made, by Anne C. Heller

Year	Review article	Work(s) reviewed
2005	— (April 17, 2005). "'The Peabody Sisters': Reflected Glory". New York Times. Archived from the original on May 29, 2015.	Marshall, Megan. The Peabody Sisters: Three Women Who Ignited American Romanticism.
2010	— (January 2010). "You Got Eyes: Robert Frank Imagines America". Harper's. Archived from the original on February 16, 2014.	Frank, Robert. The Americans. Steidl/National Gallery of Art.; Greenough, Sarah (ed.). Looking In: Robert Frank's The Americans. Steidl/National Gallery of Art.

== Awards ==
- 1974: National Jewish Book Award for Judah the Pious
- 1998: National Jewish Book Award for You Never Know: A Legend of the Lamed-vavniks. Illustration by Mark Podwal
