= Garret Linn =

American film director

- Born: 1967 (age 58–59); Kansas City, Kansas, U.S.
- Occupation: Filmmaker
- Years active: 1985 - present
- Spouse: Francisca Benítez
- Children: Claire Arlen Linn

Garret Linn (born January 14, 1967) an American experimental and documentary filmmaker. His work explores themes of memory, travel, and the representation of forgetting. He is best known for the feature-length documentary jazz concert film John Lurie and the Lounge Lizards Live in Berlin 1991 (1992) and the experimental feature film automobilux (2007).

He also has worked in collaboration and supporting contemporary artists including; Martin Beck, Micheal Joo, Kyong Park the founder of Storefront for Art and Architecture, Marjetica Potrč, Tavares Strachan, Jacques Jarrige and Gordon Kipping.

== Filmography ==
=== Jacques Jarrige: or how I lost my blind faith in unreliable narrators (2019) ===
A non-narrative exploration of the work of Jacques Jarrige.

=== C-Twon: Excerpt (2016) ===
An abstract short film exploring a quasi-narrative experience of Chinatowns around the world.

=== Oro Dulce (2015) ===
A documentary about the making of Quince Jelly in rural Chile as cinematographer and co-producer with Francisca Benítez.

=== automobilux (2007) ===
a 87 minute experimental film about travel and existentialism with music by Bowery Electric.

=== John Lurie and the Lounge Lizards Live in Berlin 1991 (1992) ===
Garret Linn's first feature film, John Lurie and the Lounge Lizards Live in Berlin 1991, was filmed in Super16 and documents a series of concerts performed by John Lurie and The Lounge Lizards at the Quartier Latin Club in Berlin, Germany, on March 28–31, 1991. The film, which runs 112 minutes, was produced by Valerie Goodman, Taku Nishimae, and Kenji Okabe, with cinematography by Ute Badura, André Harris, and Garret Linn. It was edited by Caleb Ogelsby and distributed by Telecom Japan. It premiered in limited U.S. release on September 9, 1992, and was screened at the Berlin Film Festival on September 17, 1992. It was reviewed by The New York Times and Variety.
