= Fishing with John =

1991 American television series

- DVD cover
- Created by: John Lurie
- Starring: John Lurie; Jim Jarmusch; Tom Waits; Matt Dillon; Willem Dafoe; Dennis Hopper
- Narrated by: Robb Webb
- Opening theme: "Fishing With John" by John Lurie
- Country of origin: United States
- Original language: English
- No. of seasons: 1
- No. of episodes: 6

Production
- Executive producer: Kenji Okabe
- Running time: 30 minutes

Original release
- Network: Bravo
- Release: November 20 – December 25, 1991

Related
- Painting with John

Fishing with John is a 1991 television series conceived, directed by and starring actor and musician John Lurie. On the surface, the series resembles a standard travel or fishing show: in each episode, Lurie takes a famous guest on a fishing expedition. Since Lurie has no expert knowledge of fishing, the interest is in the interaction between Lurie and his guests, all of whom are his friends. Nothing particularly unusual actually happens, but the show is edited and narrated in a way to suggest that Lurie and his guest are involved in dramatic and even supernatural adventures.

The guests featured are film director Jim Jarmusch, actor Matt Dillon, musician Tom Waits, actor Willem Dafoe and actor-director Dennis Hopper. The series ran for 6 episodes, each featuring a different guest and locale, except for episodes 5 and 6 which both feature Hopper in Thailand. Each episode has voice-over narration by Robb Webb, which is sometimes bizarre and off-topic. The soundtrack is by Lurie, with several guest performers.

Fishing With John originally aired on Bravo in 1991, and re-ran on IFC (Bravo's then-sister channel) in 1998. The Criterion Collection released a DVD of the complete series in 1999.

Since its release, the series has earned a cult following. Lurie had a spiritual successor to the series run for three seasons on HBO, Painting with John (2021–2023).

== Production ==
Fishing With John centered on actor and musician John Lurie taking fishing trips with various celebrity friends of his. Jim Jarmusch, Matt Dillon, Tom Waits, Willem Dafoe and Dennis Hopper all appear in the series.

In the Criterion DVD commentary, Lurie notes that the original plan was to film in Alabama, but funding issues forced the filming to happen in Jamaica, where Waits was already on vacation. Lurie claimed that following their trip to Jamaica, Tom Waits was displeased to the point that he did not speak to Lurie for two years afterwards.

Lurie claimed that Dennis Hopper was so high on sugar during his two-part episode that he was unable to concentrate long enough to fish. Also in the commentary, Lurie explains that the choice of Matt Dillon was largely pushed upon him by the Japanese group financing the episodes. The filmmaker had originally wanted Flea from Red Hot Chili Peppers to accompany him on the Costa Rica episode.

=== Narration ===
The narrator of Fishing With John is Robb Webb, a professional sounding announcer who often interjects with bizarre non sequiturs and dramatic inventions unsupported by the footage, such as claiming that Dennis Hopper has "seen a map on the wall of the monks' monastery that leads him to believe that somewhere in this area is the lair of the giant squid".

== Episodes ==
No.	Guest	Original release date
1	Jim Jarmusch	November 20, 1991
John and Jim fish for shark off the coast of Montauk, New York State.
2	Tom Waits	November 27, 1991
Lurie and Waits fish for red snapper in Jamaica. Tom periodically becomes grumpy, until a game of cards on dry land makes him feel much better.
3	Matt Dillon	December 4, 1991
Dillon and Lurie fish in San José, Costa Rica. Supernatural events ensue.
4	Willem Dafoe	December 11, 1991
Dafoe and Lurie go ice fishing in northern Maine. The two run out of crackers and face starvation.
5	Dennis Hopper	December 18, 1991
Lurie and Hopper search for the mythical and elusive giant squid in Thailand, which also is apparently hunting them.
6	Dennis Hopper	December 25, 1991
Part two in Thailand. The squid hypnotizes John and Dennis with its "volleyball" sized eye. Deeper and deeper into Thailand, few are chosen.

== Release ==
The entire series is available on DVD from The Criterion Collection and features a commentary track by Lurie on each episode and a music video for the song "Big Heart" by Lurie's band The Lounge Lizards. The series is also available for streaming on The Criterion Channel.

== Soundtrack ==
The series' soundtrack was largely composed by Lurie, and included Lurie himself on vocals, soprano saxophone, harmonica, keyboards, guitar. It also featured the Fishing With John Singers (Marion Beckenstein, Lisa Bielawa, Mary Ann Hart, Cassie Hoffman, Sarah Hover, Jeffrey Johnson, Phyllis Jo Kubey, Eric Lamp, and Alexandra Montano), as well as the Cassatt String Quartet: Muneko Otani, Laura Goldberg, Michiko Oshima, Anna Cholakian. Many other performers were featured, including Tom Waits, Robb Webb, Steven Bernstein, Michael Blake, Jane Scarpantoni, Evan Lurie, Doug Wieselman, Tony Scherr, Calvin Weston, Mauro Refosco, Marcus Rojas, Bart Feller, Eugene Moye, Garo Yellin, Bryan Carrott, David Tronzo, Erik Sanko, Tony Garnier, Billy Martin and Naná Vasconcelos.

A CD of the soundtrack was released in 1998 on Strange & Beautiful Records.

== Reviews and reception ==
Fishing With John has garnered positive reviews from Arkansas Democrat-Gazette, the Apollo Guide, The Digitalbits, Entertainment Weekly, and The Film Buff. The New York Times praised the series, noting that, "There is no big-bang payoff at the end of these episodes; that is part of what makes Fishing With John such an appealing alternative to the high-volume, laugh-track world of network television. It is also richly photographed by some first-rate cinematographers (including Michael Spiller, who often works with Hal Hartley). And, with music by Mr. Lurie throughout, the series sounds better than any fish deserves."

Footage from the first episode was used in the SpongeBob SquarePants episode "Hooky"; Lurie and Jarmusch were credited with guest appearances.

== See also ==
- Painting with John, an HBO television series (2021–2023) with John Lurie
