= Painting with John =

Television series featuring John Lurie

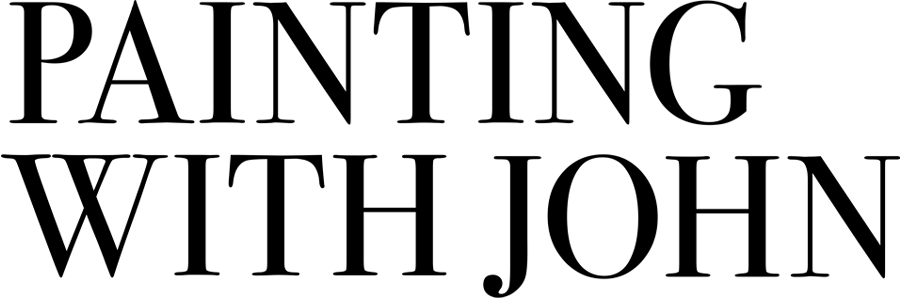
- Genre: Comedy; Docuseries
- Created by: John Lurie
- Written by: John Lurie
- Directed by: John Lurie
- Starring: John Lurie
- Composer: John Lurie
- Country of origin: United States
- Original language: English
- No. of seasons: 3
- No. of episodes: 18

Production
- Executive producers: Adam McKay; Todd Schulman
- Producers: Nesrin Wolf; Matt Dwyer
- Cinematography: Erik Mockus
- Editor: Erik Mockus
- Running time: 20–24 minutes
- Production companies: HBO Entertainment; Hyperobject Industries

Original release
- Network: HBO
- Release: January 22, 2021 – July 7, 2023

Related
- Fishing with John

Painting with John is an American unscripted television series created by musician, painter, and actor John Lurie. Each episode features Lurie painting watercolors and reflecting on life, music, and art. A six-episode first season premiered on HBO and its streaming subsidiary HBO Max on January 22, 2021. In August 2021, the series was renewed for a second season, which premiered on February 18, 2022. The third season of the series began airing on June 2, 2023. The title alludes to Lurie's earlier show, Fishing with John, from 1991. On August 16, 2023, it was announced the series was canceled.

== Synopsis ==
Part meditative tutorial, part fireside chat, musician John Lurie shares his philosophical thoughts while honing his watercolor techniques.

== Episodes ==
=== Series overview ===
Season	Episodes	Originally released	
Season	Episodes	First released	Last released
1	6	January 22, 2021	February 26, 2021
2	6	February 18, 2022	March 25, 2022
3	6	June 2, 2023	July 7, 2023

=== Season 1 (2021) ===
No. overall	No. in season	Title	Directed by	Written by	Original release date	US viewers (millions)
1	1	"Bob Ross Was Wrong"	John Lurie	John Lurie	January 22, 2021	0.185
In contrast to what television painter Bob Ross says, not everyone can paint, according to Lurie. He goes on to lament his abilities to fly a drone to film an elaborate introduction to his new television show, recounts a childhood story involving his father and brother Evan, discusses his thoughts on laughter, and invites the viewer(s) to "write a poem" while viewing the sunset.
2	2	"The Explosion Story"	John Lurie	John Lurie	January 29, 2021	0.215
Lurie recounts his cancer treatment and vertigo, while remembering an incident involving him reheating curry with a gas stove. He goes on to show more of his life at home on his undisclosed Caribbean island, enjoying rolling tires down hills, and with his housemates, and recounting the time he met Barry White, who said he was very fond of the Lounge Lizards' album Voice of Chunk.
3	3	"Elephant"	John Lurie	John Lurie	February 5, 2021	0.223
Lurie discovers fragment of a tree that resembles an elephant trunk. He discusses his upbringing with his brother and their shared love of Little Walter, and John Coltrane. The background of the art design of the album cover of Voice of Chunk is discussed, with an elaborate tale of Lurie purchasing and photographing an eel. Throughout the episode, Lurie is painting a piece called Elephant, revealed in the end credits.
4	4	"Fame Is Bad"	John Lurie	John Lurie	February 12, 2021	0.171
Lurie discusses his thoughts on fame and what he had encountered in his life as a musician and actor: a casual meeting with Gore Vidal, partying with Rick James and Steve Rubell, mentoring Zach Galifianakis, his friendship with Anthony Bourdain, and his collaborations with Jim Jarmusch and Tom Waits.
5	5	"The Disappearance of Chicken Man"	John Lurie	John Lurie	February 19, 2021	0.089
Lurie recounts his times with his companion "Leroy" around his village concerning various neighbors and townspeople whom they were convinced were mysteriously disappearing, one of them they nicknamed "The Chicken Man". He goes on to discuss his relationship with his mother, and their collective disgust with the registry of motor vehicles in Massachusetts. The episode ends with a live action/animated mashup of Lurie's artwork and surroundings amongst his song (alias Marvin Pontiac) "My Little Garden Gnome" playing in the background.
6	6	"Finding Rudolph"	John Lurie	John Lurie	February 26, 2021	0.209
Lurie recounts his friendship with a man named "Rudolph" on the remote island he lives on, and reminisces on their times together, before Rudolph's absence from his life. Lurie and Nesrin set out to reunite with Rudolph while enjoying the countryside. Lurie describes the local tree frogs he hears in their natural habitat and their musical coordination. Lurie wraps up the series discussing how, despite his battles with his illnesses, he happened to meet the series cinematographer Erik leading to a new series and a medium for him to showcase his work, yet just how uncomfortable it made him. The episode ends with John Lurie successfully commandeering his drone for his show's introduction and welcoming the viewer to Painting with John. His collective artwork is showcased in the end credits.

=== Season 2 (2022) ===
No. overall	No. in season	Title	Directed by	Written by	Original release date	US viewers (millions)
7	1	"What?"	John Lurie	John Lurie	February 18, 2022	N/A
Lurie welcomes the viewer to season two of Painting with John, a show in which he reassured them he would not teach them how to paint. He laments about the exploitation of dental and cosmetic commercials. Nesrin Wolf and Ann Mary Gludd James are featured actors in a half-live action and animated segment with Lurie called "Cowboy Beckett", spoofing Western movies. Lurie talks about his family upbringing concerning religion, and his unexplained and comedic habit of "finding coins falling out of his nose". An animated segment called "Synchronized Swimming" occurs. Lurie updates viewers on his life at home since the reception of season one of the series on his undisclosed island and the environmental impacts, and also unfortunate household and personal dilemmas.
8	2	"Children Kicking Hamburger All Over The Highway"	John Lurie	John Lurie	February 25, 2022	N/A
Lurie opens the show with his thoughts on men who catcall women. He goes on to have a surreal heated discussion with the Man in the Moon. The "Cowboy Beckett" segment with Nesrin and Ann Mary continues. Lurie recounts his time in the early 1980's being acquainted with Péter Halász from the Squat Theatre in New York City, and his sudden chance to make a trip to Barcelona. Lurie recounts the lecture in Barcelona about technology in theatre in which he took in Halász' place; despite his confidence to pass the allotted time, it went awry.
9	3	"The Bugs Are Winning"	John Lurie	John Lurie	March 4, 2022	N/A
Nesrin opens the show in place of John, saying he "has lots of work to do," while she contributes to one of his own paintings. Lurie begins his segment talking about his thoughts on intuition's role while painting. Lurie talks about his thoughts of driving alongside other people, and their body language. The "Cowboy Beckett" segment with Nesrin and Ann Mary continues with the trio on the hunt for a puma. Lurie recounts the time when he met Joey Ramone in New York City. He details the bugs and wildlife that he encounters in summertime, and an instance with Erik where the two had trouble containing a very large and strange bug. "Cowboy Beckett" continues, with the trio saying nonsensical and random phrases to each other. Lurie ends the show thanking viewers for sending in their poems about the sunset in which he enocouraged them to write (from the previous season), but kindly tells them to not send any more to him. During the end credits Lurie is shown in the recording studio with Calvin Weston (who played drums for The Lounge Lizards) creating new music for the series.
10	4	"Your Hands Have Turned into Lightbulbs"	John Lurie	John Lurie	March 11, 2022	N/A
John begins the episode with a breathing exercise for the viewer, instructing them to imagine their hands turning into lightbulbs. Lurie paints while listening to a new piece of music he created for the series, which features Calvin Weston, Tony Scherr, Kenny Wollesen, Doug Wieselman, Smokey Hormel, Michael Blake, Steven Bernstein, Clark Guyton, Curtis Fowlkes. Lurie wishes the subtitle transcribers well in their efforts to type out the show's text, and explains his nonsensical "Adabadeewa" phrase, saying its a word for his bond with Erik, the show's cinematographer. He recounts a pleasant trip to Tahiti, until he encountered other tourists there. Lurie recounts his teenage years occasionally letting Jean-Michel Basquiat live with him, and encountering Klaus Nomi in New York. John and Nesrin end the show saying they want to stop the show, leaving Erik to chase them in a game of hide-and-seek throughout the residence, as Lurie's song "Ketchak" plays throughout.
11	5	"Small Car"	John Lurie	John Lurie	March 18, 2022	N/A
John opens the show praising the fruit that grows on his island, telling a story about his disappointment when he ate watermelon while traveling in Turkey with Nesrin. "Cowboy Beckett" continues with the trio spouting more nonsense to each other. John recounts a tour stop in Europe with him, Calvin Weston and Billy Martin serving as a trio, with Evan Lurie as an opening act, and an abrupt exit from Bulgaria. The Marvin Pontiac song "Small Car" plays amongst an animated segment. Ann Mary demonstrates to the viewer how to make "weapon potatoes". The trio end the episode as they take their weapon potatoes to "invade a neighboring village."
12	6	"Old Man Dancing"	John Lurie	John Lurie	March 25, 2022	N/A
John starts off the episode with his thoughts on climate change. He discusses his fascination with vocal sound, especially in Ennio Morricone's film score for The Good, the Bad and the Ugly. He recounts the time he wrote music for commercials advertising Barneys department store, and how this experience led to further work in advertising for an oil company, which made him uncomfortable. Lurie and several old friends and collaborators are seen rehearsing more new music together in a recording studio. Lurie recounts when his father took him to game three of the 1962 World Series at Yankee Stadium and describing his boyhood ritual to seemingly enact good luck onto his baseball hero Mickey Mantle. John, Nesrin and Ann Mary all take time out of their day to spontaneously dance outside.

=== Season 3 (2023) ===
The third season of the series consists of six episodes and it aired from June 2 to July 7, 2023. Lurie's friend and fellow musician Flea appeared in one of the episodes.

No. overall	No. in season	Title	Directed by	Written by	Original release date	US viewers (millions)
13	1	"Hermits Unite"	John Lurie	John Lurie	June 2, 2023	N/A
14	2	"Potato"	John Lurie	John Lurie	June 9, 2023	N/A
15	3	"The Sea Monster"	John Lurie	John Lurie	June 16, 2023	N/A
16	4	"My Friend Flea"	John Lurie	John Lurie	June 23, 2023	N/A
17	5	"How the Music Is Made"	John Lurie	John Lurie	June 30, 2023	N/A
18	6	"The Night Hunters"	John Lurie	John Lurie	July 7, 2023	N/A

== Production ==
The episodes were recorded at Lurie's home on an undisclosed island in the Caribbean. In June 2021, Lurie announced a second season of the show was planned and for the first time in 22 years, he was rehearsing music for it. In August 2021, HBO renewed the series for a second season.

== Soundtrack ==
The series' soundtrack features music by Lurie, who was a founding member of the Lounge Lizards and the creator of Marvin Pontiac.

== Reception ==
The series has received positive reviews from critics. Robert Lloyd of Los Angeles Times wrote "Painting with John represents HBO at its most worthwhile: arty and unpredictable." Robert Ito of New York Times described the show as "a meditative and often joyful blend of painting and personal storytelling." On Rotten Tomatoes, the series holds an approval rating of 100% based on 15 reviews, with an average rating of 8.0/10. The website's critical consensus states, "A celebration of art and life through the eyes of a delightful curmudgeon, Painting with John is a surprising, intimate feat of TV joy.".

== See also ==
- Fishing with John, a 1991 Bravo television series with John Lurie
