= Erik Sanko =

- Also known as: Erik Norse Sanko
- Born: September 27, 1963 (age 62); New York City, U.S.
- Occupations: Musician; visual artist
- Instrument: Bass guitar
- Years active: 1984–present
- Labels: Jetset; Capitol; Ipecac Recordings; Arctic Rodeo
- Member of: Knife Thrower; SQURL
- Formerly of: The Lounge Lizards; John Cale Band; Skeleton Key
- Website: phantomlimbcompany.com

Erik Sanko (born 27 September 1963) is an American bassist who has played in the Lounge Lizards, Skeleton Key and currently active in Knife Thrower and SQURL.

== Biography ==
In the past he also worked with notable musicians including Marc Ribot, John Cale, Yoko Ono, Suzanne Vega, Jim Carroll, Gavin Friday, They Might Be Giants, The Melvins, James Chance and the Contortions, Danny Elfman, The Kronos Quartet and members of Enon and Sleepytime Gorilla Museum. Besides being a musician, he's also a visual artist who creates marionettes. Erik Sanko is married and works with visual artist/set designer/director Jessica Grindstaff. His work has been reviewed in The Village Voice and The New York Times. In 2007 he, together with Jessica Grindstaff, founded Phantom Limb, a multi-media based theater company for which Erik is primarily composer and puppet maker.

== Discography ==
- Past Imperfect, Present Tense (Jetset Records, 2001)
- Puppet Boy (2016)

With John Cale

- Antártida (1995)
- Walking on Locusts (1996)
- HoboSapiens (2003)
- Extra Playful (2011)
- Shifty Adventures in Nookie Wood (2012)

With Jim Carroll

- Pools of Mercury (1998)

With Anna Domino

- Mysteries of America (1990)

With The Fertile Crescent

- The Fertile Crescent (1992)

With Gavin Friday

- Adam 'n' Eve (1992)
- Shag Tobacco (1996)

With The Lounge Lizards

- Big Heart: Live Tokyo (1986)
- No Pain for Cakes (1987)
- Voice of Chunk (1988)
- Queen of All Ears (1998)

With John Lurie

- Fishing with John (1998)
- The Legendary Marvin Pontiac: Greatest Hits (2000)

With Mono Puff

- Unsupervised (1996)

With Seigen Ono

- Nekono Topia Nekono Mania (1990)

With Yoko Ono

- Blueprint for a Sunrise (2001)

With Skeleton Key

- Skeleton Key EP (1996)
- Fantastic Spikes Through Balloon (1997)
- An Elipse EP (2001)
- Obtainium (2002)
- The Lyon's Quintette EP (2005)
- Gravity is the Enemy (2011)

With They Might Be Giants

- Severe Tire Damage (1998)
- Live (1999)
- A User's Guide to They Might Be Giants (2005)

With Suzanne Vega

- Days of Open Hand (1990)

With John Waite

- Temple Bar (1995)

With others

- Communication Breakdown (Doppelganger, 1985)
- Best Wishes (Hajime Mizoguchi, 1988)
- Stained Glass Sky (Masters of None, 1994)
- Ô Seasons Ô Castles (Katell Keineg, 1994)
- Babywoman (Naomi Campbell, 1994)
- Dawntown Project (CharlElie, 1995)
- In Paradisu (Les Nouvelles Polyphonies Corses, 1996)
- The Crybaby (Melvins, 2000)
- Band Mrazem (Emil de Waal / Jonas Johansen, 2000
- 109 Poèmes Électro (CharlElie, 2000)
- Answers (Ui, 2002)
- Joan as Police Woman EP (Joan as Police Woman, 2004)
- Live+ (Emil de Waal, 2006)
