= Queen of All Ears =

Studio album by the Lounge Lizards
- Released: March 1998
- Studios: Power Station, New York City
- Labels: Strange & Beautiful Music
- Producers: John Lurie, Pat Dillett

The Lounge Lizards chronology
Live in Berlin 1991 Vol. II (1992)	Queen of All Ears (1998)

Queen of All Ears is the fourth and final studio album by the American band the Lounge Lizards, released in March 1998.

"The First and Royal Queen" was used at the end of episodes of Painting with John. The band supported the album with an international tour.

== Production ==
The album was produced by John Lurie and Pat Dillett. The tracks were written by Lurie, with bass player Erik Sanko cowriting two. Jane Scarpantoni played cello on Queen of All Ears; in total, nine musicians played on the album.

Released on Lurie's own label, it was originally intended for Luaka Bop; legal issues delayed the release for two years. Lurie considered writing a book about the ordeal, to be titled What Do You Know About Music? You're Not a Lawyer. The account was told in Lurie's memoir The History of Bones (2021), in which he also apologized to David Tronzo, because a song intended as a showcase for Tronzo was cut from the album and thus the guitarist did not perform a solo on the recording.

== Critical reception ==
Professional ratings
Review scores
Source	Rating
AllMusic	4.5/5 stars
Robert Christgau	(1-star Honorable Mention)
MusicHound Rock: The Essential Album Guide	3.5/5 stars

JazzTimes wrote that "the music relies heavily on group improvisation in the highly colored riffs and patterns that form the basis of most of the proceedings." Esquire determined that Lurie's "alto and soprano saxophoning has become something rather nice: plaintive, searching, Colemanesque, quite at home (soaring) in the upper registers." The Boston Globe opined that "New York's fringe-crawlers mature with impressionistic etchings of chamber jazz and world music."

The Guardian stated that "the Lounge Lizards roll from moments of prayer-like intensity—Coltranesque flourishes over African pulsing—to Charles Mingus doing the music for scary Czech cartoons, to blasting Dragnet rumbles." The Chicago Tribune opined that the album "embarks on an Amer-Euro-Afro fake jazz cruise brimming with trans-global eclecticism, defanged Mingus/Monk moves and sometimes striking instrumental explosions."

AllMusic wrote that "John Lurie's so-called 'non-jazz' approach is in full flower on this fascinating record."

== Track listing ==
All tracks composed by John Lurie, except where noted.

No.	Title	Writer(s)	Length
1.	"The First and Royal Queen"		3:59
2.	"The Birds Near Her House"	John Lurie, Erik Sanko	11:40
3.	"Scary Children"		4:07
4.	"She Drove Me Mad"		4:21
5.	"Queen of All Ears"		5:25
6.	"Monsters Over Bangkok"		10:13
7.	"Three Crowns of Wood"	John Lurie, Erik Sanko	4:01
8.	"John Zorn's S&M Circus"		6:13
9.	"Yak"		5:41
10.	"Queen Reprise"		3:46

== Personnel ==
- John Lurie – tenor and alto saxophone
- Michael Blake – tenor saxophone, bass clarinet
- Steven Bernstein – trumpet
- David Tronzo – slide guitar
- Erik Sanko – bass
- Evan Lurie – piano, organ
- Calvin Weston – drums
- Ben Perowsky – percussion
- Jane Scarpantoni – cello
