= The Lounge Lizards (album) =

Studio album by the Lounge Lizards
- Released: 1981
- Recorded: July 21–22, 28–29, 1980
- Studio: CBS, New York City
- Genre: Avant-garde jazz
- Label: E.G.
- Producer: Teo Macero

The Lounge Lizards chronology
The Lounge Lizards (1981)	No Pain for Cakes (1987)

Professional ratings
Review scores
Source	Rating
AllMusic	4.5/5 stars
The Rolling Stone Album Guide	3/5 stars
Sounds	4/5 stars
The Village Voice	B+

The Lounge Lizards is the first album by the Lounge Lizards. It features hectic instrumental jazz. The songs are mostly composed by band leader and saxophone player John Lurie. The album artwork was designed by the English graphic designer Peter Saville.

== Track listing ==
All songs written by John Lurie, except where noted.

1. "Incident on South Street" – 3:21
2. "Harlem Nocturne" (Earle Hagen) – 2:04
3. "Do the Wrong Thing" (John Lurie, Steve Piccolo) – 2:39
4. "Au Contraire Arto" – 3:22
5. "Well You Needn't" (Thelonious Monk) – 1:53
6. "Ballad" – 3:22
7. "Wangling" – 2:58
8. "Conquest of Rar" (John Lurie, Evan Lurie, Anton Fier) – 3:12
9. "Demented" – 2:01
10. "I Remember Coney Island" – 3:27
11. "Fatty Walks" – 2:51
12. "Epistrophy" (Thelonious Monk, Kenneth Clarke) – 4:12
13. "You Haunt Me" – 3:40

== Personnel ==
Lounge Lizards

- John Lurie – alto saxophone
- Evan Lurie – keyboards
- Steve Piccolo – bass
- Arto Lindsay – guitar
- Anton Fier – drums

Technical

- Frank Laico – engineering
- Ted Brosnan – engineering
- Peter Saville – design
- Fran Pelzman – photography
