= Voice of Chunk =

Studio album by the Lounge Lizards
- Released: 1988
- Recorded: September–November 1988
- Studios: Mediasound, New York City; Clinton Recording, New York City; Nas Nuvens, Rio de Janeiro
- Genre: Avant-garde jazz
- Length: 47:00
- Labels: Strange and Beautiful Music
- Producer: John Lurie

The Lounge Lizards chronology
No Pain for Cakes (1987)	Voice of Chunk (1988)	Queen of All Ears (1998)

Professional ratings
Review scores
Source	Rating
AllMusic	4.5/5 stars

Voice of Chunk is the third studio album by jazz band the Lounge Lizards, released in 1988.

The album was produced independently by bandleader John Lurie, following two releases with Island Records. After unsuccessfully shopping the album to several record labels, Lurie decided to hire a company to print copies of Voice of Chunk and sell it himself through mail-order, promoted with advertisements on television. He reports the album sold about 30,000 copies, a substantial sum for an independent jazz album, but promotional and sales costs were higher than anticipated so the album was not financially profitable. Voice of Chunk was later re-released on frontman John Lurie's record label Strange and Beautiful Music.

The song "Uncle Jerry" was a tribute to Lurie's paternal uncle.

== Track listing ==
All tracks composed by John Lurie; except where indicated

1. "Bob the Bob"
2. "Voice of Chunk" (John Lurie, Erik Sanko)
3. "One Big Yes"
4. "The Hanging"
5. "Uncle Jerry" (John Lurie, Erik Sanko)
6. "A Paper Bag and the Sun" (John Lurie, Dougie Bowne, Marc Ribot)
7. "Tarantella" (music: Evan Lurie; lyrics: The Lounge Lizards)
8. "Bob the Bob Home"
9. "Sharks"
10. "Travel" (Evan Lurie)

== Personnel ==
- John Lurie – alto and soprano saxophone
- Evan Lurie – piano
- Marc Ribot – guitar, trumpet
- Curtis Fowlkes – trombone
- Roy Nathanson – alto and tenor saxophone
- E.J. Rodriguez – percussion
- Erik Sanko – bass
- Dougie Bowne – drums
