= No Pain for Cakes =

Studio album by the Lounge Lizards
- Released: 1987
- Recorded: November 1986
- Genre: Jazz
- Length: 38:00
- Label: Antilles/Island
- Producer: John Lurie

The Lounge Lizards chronology
Lounge Lizards (1981)	No Pain for Cakes (1987)	Voice of Chunk (1988)

No Pain for Cakes is the second studio album by the American jazz band the Lounge Lizards, released in 1987. John Lurie sang on the album.

== Production ==
The album was recorded at Kaufman Astoria Studios, in Queens, New York. Marc Ribot contributed to No Pain for Cakes.

== Critical reception ==
Professional ratings
Review scores
Source	Rating
Robert Christgau	B+
MusicHound Rock: The Essential Album Guide	3/5 stars
The Rolling Stone Album Guide	3.5/5 stars
Windsor Star	C+

The Globe and Mail called the album "mature and vivid music, always ingenious and sometimes brilliant." The Windsor Star wrote that the Lounge Lizards "sound as if their music is written by a contemporary Kurt Weill for a Fellini movie without them ever taking their tongues out of their cheeks." The Christian Science Monitor deemed No Pain for Cakes "zany weirdness and outrageous eclecticism—avant pop/jazz/rock."

== Track listing ==
All tracks composed by John Lurie; except where indicated

1. "My Trip to Ireland"
2. "No Pain for Cakes"
3. "My Clown's on Fire" (John Lurie, Curtis Fowlkes, Marc Ribot)
4. "Carry Me Out"
5. "Bob and Nico"
6. "Tango #3, Determination for Rosa Parks" (Evan Lurie)
7. "The Magic of Palermo" (John Lurie, Evan Lurie)
8. "Cue for Passion" (Evan Lurie)
9. "Where Were You" (Evan Lurie, Erik Sanko)

== Personnel ==
Lounge Lizards

- Evan Lurie – piano; voice on "My Trip to Ireland"
- John Lurie – alto saxophone, painting
- Marc Ribot – guitar, banjo
- Tyler Smith – cornet on "Carry Me Out"
- Curtis Fowlkes – trombone
- Roy Nathanson – reeds
- Erik Sanko – bass
- Dougie Bowne – drums
- E.J. Rodriguez – percussion

Additional personnel

- Anders Gårdmand – baritone saxophone on "No Pain for Cakes" and "Carry Me Out"
- Jill Jaffe – violin on "No Pain for Cakes"
- Seigen Ono at the Kaufman Astoria Studios, Queens – recording and mixing
- Valerie Goodman – coordinator
- Ted Jensen at Sterling Sound, NYC – mastering
