= Beat (Bowery Electric album) =

Studio album by Bowery Electric
- Released: November 12, 1996
- Recorded: June 1996
- Studio: Studio .45 (Hartford, Connecticut)
- Genres: Post-rock; shoegaze; ambient pop; trip hop; dream pop; ambient
- Length: 63:35
- Label: Kranky
- Producers: Rich Costey; Bowery Electric

Bowery Electric chronology
Bowery Electric (1995)	Beat (1996)	Vertigo (1997)

Singles from Beat
- 1. "Without Stopping"; 2. "Coming Down"

Beat is the second studio album by American band Bowery Electric. It was released on November 12, 1996 by Kranky. Beggars Banquet Records licensed Beat for release in the United Kingdom and Europe in 1997.

The cover art is taken from Catherine Opie's photograph "Untitled No. 27", depicting the Corona Del Mar Freeway in Costa Mesa, California.

== Background and composition ==
Beat was recorded and co-produced by Bowery Electric and Rich Costey at Studio .45 in Hartford, Connecticut in June 1996. Drummer Wayne Magruder contributed to four of the ten tracks. Lawrence Chandler of Bowery Electric said to Alternative Press in 1997 that "Beat [was] the beginning of us learning our way around a proper sampler and software which allow[ed] us to work with samples on the computer. We [could] sample ourselves, manipulate sounds, create our own beats and basically work with fewer restrictions."

== Release and reception ==
Professional ratings
Review scores
Source	Rating
AllMusic	4.5/5 stars
Alternative Press	5/5
NME	7/10
Pitchfork	9.1/10

Beat was released on November 12, 1996 by Kranky. Beggars Banquet Records licensed Beat for release in the United Kingdom and Europe. Two singles, "Without Stopping" and "Coming Down", were released from the album. Bowery Electric toured the United Kingdom and North America following the album's release.

Bowery Electric co-headlined the Music in the Anchorage festival with Mogwai in New York on June 20, 1997. They performed in London on July 16, 1997 and on The Think Stage at The Phoenix Festival. Reviewing a concert during the tour, Melody Maker noted "for two people to be able to create such a huge, rolling epic sound is surprising; what really hits hard is just how huge it can be, how the inarguable and pulverising beauty of BE's sound simply forces a slacked out crowd into its swell." A John Peel Session was recorded at Maida Vale Studios in London on July 20, 1997 and broadcast on BBC Radio 1 August 7, 1997.

The album was reissued in the United States by Kranky on November 18, 2016.

Melody Maker named the album the "rock LP of the year", and The Wire praised the album as "genre-defining". Neil Strauss of The New York Times rated it in his 1997 selection of albums "that haven't received much attention but are worth the extra time it takes to hunt for them". In a 2016 review of the album's reissue, The Wire wrote: "This music hasn't aged a bit. ... [It] remains an unexplored road to a wondrous promontory only Bowery Electric have ever reached".

British music distributor Boomkat described the album upon a 2023 reissue as "a hypnotic set of sampled breaks and shimmered guitar and vocal textures that split the difference between DJ Shadow and MBV [...] pre-empting the wave of electronic shoegaze revivalists".

== Track listing ==
No.	Title	Length
1.	"Beat"	7:16
2.	"Empty Words"	3:45
3.	"Without Stopping"	5:13
4.	"Under the Sun"	3:32
5.	"Fear of Flying"	5:39
6.	"Looped"	2:39
7.	"Black Light"	6:53
8.	"Inside Out"	7:19
9.	"Coming Down"	4:38
10.	"Postscript"	16:41

Reissue bonus track
No.	Title	Length
11.	"Low Density"	7:16

== Personnel ==
Credits are adapted from the Beat sleeve.

- Martha Schwendener – bass, keyboards, vocals
- Lawrence Chandler – guitar, keyboards, programming, vocals
- Rich Costey – production
- Bowery Electric – production
- Wayne Magruder – drums (on tracks 2, 7, 8, 9)
- Catherine Opie – photography ("Untitled No. 27" from her Freeway Series)
