= John Lurie and the Lounge Lizards Live in Berlin 1991 =

- Directed by: Garret Linn
- Produced by: Valerie Goodman; Taku Nishimae; Kenji Okabe
- Starring: John Lurie and the Lounge Lizards
- Cinematography: Ute Badura; André Harris; Garret Linn
- Edited by: Caleb Ogelsby
- Music by: John Lurie and the Lounge Lizards
- Distributed by: Telecom Japan
- Release dates: September 9, 1992 (U.S. limited); September 17, 1992 (Berlin Film Festival)
- Running time: 112 minutes
- Countries: United States; Japan
- Language: English
- Budget: $320,000

John Lurie and the Lounge Lizards Live in Berlin 1991 is a 1992 documentary concert film directed and shot by Garret Linn. It was the director's first feature, and was filmed in Super16. It was shown at The Water Reade Theater in New York City and was part of the Berlin Film Festival in 1992.

== Summary ==
A feature film of a concert given at the Quartier Latin Club in Berlin, Germany on March 28–31, 1991.

== Cast/players ==
- John Lurie – alto and soprano saxophone
- Steven Bernstein – trumpet and cornet
- Michael Blake – tenor and soprano saxophone
- Oren Bloedow – bass
- Bryan Carrott – vibraphone, Marimba, and timpani
- Billy Martin – percussion
- Michele Navazio – guitar
- Jane Scarpantoni – cello
- Grant Calvin Weston – drums

== Review ==
John Lurie and the Lounge Lizards Live in Berlin 1991 was reviewed by The New York Times and Variety.

== Availability ==
The film was extremely difficult to find for many years. There was a limited number of screenings in Germany and the United States along with a small release in Japan. An audio CD recording of the same concert was released by VeraBra Records under the title of "Live in Berlin 1991 Vol. I & Vol. II". In early 2011 the company that made the film released a low quality version on YouTube.
