= Lushlife (album) =

Studio album by Bowery Electric
- Released: February 22, 2000
- Genre: Trip hop
- Length: 50:35
- Label: Beggars Banquet Records
- Producer: Bowery Electric

Bowery Electric chronology
Vertigo (1997)	Lushlife (2000)

Singles from Lushlife
- 1. "Lushlife" Released: 1999; 2. "Freedom Fighter" Released: 1999

Professional ratings
Review scores
Source	Rating
AllMusic	3/5 stars
The Austin Chronicle	4/5 stars
Billboard	favorable
CMJ New Music Report	favorable
Exclaim!	unfavorable
PopMatters	6/10 stars

Lushlife is the third and final studio album by Bowery Electric. It was released on Beggars Banquet Records on February 22, 2000.

== Reception ==
Andy Kellman of AllMusic gave the album 3 stars out of 5, commenting that "Lawrence Chandler's beats, though highly clichéd at points, land harder than before, and Martha Schwendener's vocals are more prominent." He called it their "most song-based" and "most accessible" work.

Marc Savlov of The Austin Chronicle gave the album 4 stars out of 5, describing it as "a morphine drip of an album, so clear and precise in its smokey, sexy grooves that it seems almost too easy to compare them to fellow late-night nodders Portishead." Sarah Zupko of PopMatters gave the album 6 stars out of 10, saying, "the tone herein is decidedly downcast and often forlorn."

== Track listing ==
All tracks are written by Lawrence Chandler and Martha Schwendener.

No.	Title	Length
1.	"Floating World"	4:44
2.	"Lushlife"	7:52
3.	"Shook Ones"	4:50
4.	"Psalms of Survival"	4:40
5.	"Soul City"	3:42
6.	"Freedom Fighter"	3:47
7.	"Saved"	6:11
8.	"Deep Blue"	4:19
9.	"After Landing"	3:52
10.	"Passages"	6:38

== Personnel ==
=== Bowery Electric ===
- Lawrence Chandler – programming, sampling, scratching, bass guitar, guitar, keyboards, drums, string arrangement
- Martha Schwendener – vocals, bass guitar, guitar, keyboards, string arrangement
