= Bear Surprise =

Watercolor painting by John Lurie

The painting has a speech bubble from the bear, which reads "Surprise!"

Bear Surprise (often dubbed just Surprise!) is a watercolor painting by American painter/musician John Lurie, the style of which has been described as primitivist and naïve. The painting depicts a couple having sex in a meadow, with a bear standing in front of them, with forepaws in a distinctive position. There is a speech bubble beside the head of the bear, which reads "Surprise!".

The painting features in a popular internet meme in Russian online culture. It has been described by Victor Sonkin in The Moscow Times as having "gained vast popularity with the speed of an avalanche". Its popularity in Runet led to the bear's speech bubble being changed from "Surprise" to "Preved", misspelling of the Russian word privet ("hello" or "hi"). The title eventually became known as Preved Medved (translation "Hello Bear").
