= Skeleton Key (band) =

American rock band

- Origin: New York City, New York, United States
- Genres: Alternative rock, industrial rock, experimental rock
- Years active: 1994–present
- Labels: Motel, Capitol, Ipecac, Do Tell, Arctic Rodeo Recordings
- Members: Erik Sanko; Craig LeBlang; Benjamin Clapp; Bob Vaccarelli
- Past members: Sean Sankey; Matthias Bossi; Tim Keiper; Chris Maxwell; Rick Lee; Steve Calhoon; Alec Ferrell; Nic Brown
- Website: www.skeletonkey.org

Skeleton Key is an American rock band based in New York City, United States. The band originated in 1994 by bassist and singer Erik Sanko, the only constant member of the band. His vision was to create a sound "luxurious, yet affordable," using antique microphones, primitive guitars, and unconventional percussion.

== History ==
The band’s first release was the Human Pin Cushion single with Dedicated Records. In 1996, the band released an eponymous EP on Motel Records that Rolling Stone said "shows how pop culture and high culture can bring everyone to the same place."

The following year saw the band release their first full-length album, Fantastic Spikes Through Balloon, on Capitol Records. The album was nominated for a Grammy Award in 1998 for its Stefan Sagmeister-designed artwork, which featured holes punched through the booklet of liner notes and, for promotional copies, a steel spike housed within the spine enclosure of the CD jewel case.

In early 2011, the band successfully raised over $9,000 on the online crowdfunding website Kickstarter, used to finish production of their next album. Later that year, they signed with Arctic Rodeo Recordings and announced an upcoming release. On March 7, 2012, a promotional video of the band in the studio was released via Visions Magazin.

== Band members ==
=== Current ===
- Erik Sanko – Bass guitar, vocals
- Craig LeBlang – Guitar
- Benjamin Clapp – "Junk" percussion
- Bob Vaccarelli – Drum kit

=== Former ===
- Chris Maxwell – Guitar
- Alec Ferrell – Guitar
- Rick Lee – "Junk" percussion
- Matthias Bossi – Drum kit
- Sean Sankey – Drum kit
- Nic Brown - Drums
- Tim Keiper – "Junk" percussion
- Steve Calhoon - Drum kit/Junk percussion

== Discography ==
- Human Pin Cushion Single (1995, Dedicated Records)
- Skeleton Key EP (1996, Motel Records)
- Fantastic Spikes Through Balloon (1997, Capitol Records)
- An Ellipse (2001, Exquisite Corpse Records)
- Obtainium (2002, Ipecac Recordings)
- Live at Metro (2004, Re:Live)
- The Lyons Quintette EP (2005, Do Tell Records)
- Gravity is the Enemy (2012, Arctic Rodeo Recordings)

== Awards ==
Independent Music Awards 2013: Gravity is the Enemy - Best Eclectic Album
