= John Lurie =

American musician, painter and actor

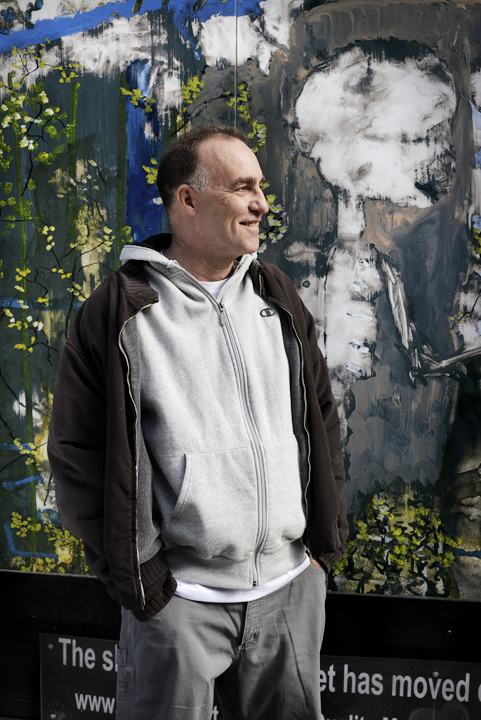
- Lurie in 2013
- Born: December 14, 1952 (age 73); Minneapolis, Minnesota, U.S.
- Occupations: Actor; musician; painter; television producer
- Years active: 1978–present
- Known for: The Lounge Lizards
- Television: Painting with John, Fishing with John, Oz
- Relatives: Evan Lurie (brother)
- Website: www.johnlurieart.com

John Lurie (born December 14, 1952) is an American musician, painter, actor, director, and producer. He co-founded the Lounge Lizards jazz ensemble; has acted in 19 films, including Stranger than Paradise and Down by Law; has composed and performed music for 20 television and film works; and he produced, directed, and starred in the Fishing with John television series. In 1996 his soundtrack for Get Shorty was nominated for a Grammy Award, and his album The Legendary Marvin Pontiac: Greatest Hits has been praised by critics and fellow musicians.

Since 2000, he has suffered from symptoms attributed to chronic Lyme disease and has focused his attention on painting. His art has been shown in galleries and museums around the world. His primitivist painting Bear Surprise became an internet meme in Russia in 2006. His television series, Painting with John, debuted on HBO in January 2021 and ran for three seasons before being cancelled. Lurie's 1980s NYC memoir, The History of Bones, was published by Penguin Random House in August 2021.

== Early life ==
Lurie was born in Minneapolis, Minnesota, and raised with his brother Evan and sister Liz in New Orleans, Louisiana, and Worcester, Massachusetts. His mother, an artist, was Welsh, and his father was half Russian Jewish and half Sicilian.

In high school, he played basketball and harmonica and jammed with Mississippi Fred McDowell and Canned Heat in 1968. He briefly played the harmonica in a band from Boston, but soon switched to the guitar and eventually the saxophone.

After high school, he hitchhiked across the United States to Berkeley, California. He moved to New York City in 1974, then briefly visited London, where he performed his first saxophone solo at the Acme Gallery.

== Music ==
=== The Lounge Lizards ===
In 1978 John formed the Lounge Lizards with his brother Evan Lurie on piano; they were the only constant members in the band through numerous lineup changes.

Robert Palmer of The New York Times described the band as "staking out new territory west of Mingus, east of Bernard Herrman." While originally a somewhat satirical "fake jazz" combo spawned by the noisy No Wave music scene, the Lounge Lizards gradually became a showcase for Lurie's increasingly sophisticated compositions. The band had five to eight members. Musicians included, at different times, guitarists Arto Lindsay, Marc Ribot, David Tronzo, Michele Navazio and Danny Blumenthal; cellist Jane Scarpantoni; vibraphonist Bryan Carrott; keyboardist John Medeski; drummers Anton Fier, Grant Calvin Weston and Dougie Bowne; percussionists Billy Martin, E.J. Rodriguez and Ben Perowsky; bassists Erik Sanko, Tony Scherr, Oren Bloedow and Tony Garnier; trumpeter Steven Bernstein; trombonist Curtis Fowlkes and saxophonists Roy Nathanson and Michael Blake. They made music for 20 years.

=== Marvin Pontiac ===
In 1999 Lurie released the album The Legendary Marvin Pontiac: Greatest Hits, a posthumous collection of the work of an African-Jewish musician named Marvin Pontiac, a fictional character Lurie created. It includes a biographical profile describing the troubled genius's hard life, and the cover shows a photograph purported to be one of the few ever taken of him. Lurie wrote the music and performed with John Medeski, Billy Martin, G. Calvin Weston, Marc Ribot, and Tony Scherr. The album received praise from David Bowie, Angelique Kidjo, Iggy Pop, Leonard Cohen and others. On choosing to create a character to whom the album would be fictionally credited, Lurie said in a 2008 interview, "For a long time, I was threatening to do a vocal record. But the idea of me putting out a record where I sang seemed ostentatious or pretentious. Like the music of Telly Savalas . . . I don't sing very well, I was shy about it. As a character, it made it easier."

Elmore Leonard's 2002 novel Tishomingo Blues has detailed descriptions of Marvin Pontiac's biography and music, crediting him with influencing Iggy Pop and David Bowie.

In 2017, John Lurie released his first music album in 17 years, Marvin Pontiac: The Asylum Tapes.

=== John Lurie National Orchestra ===
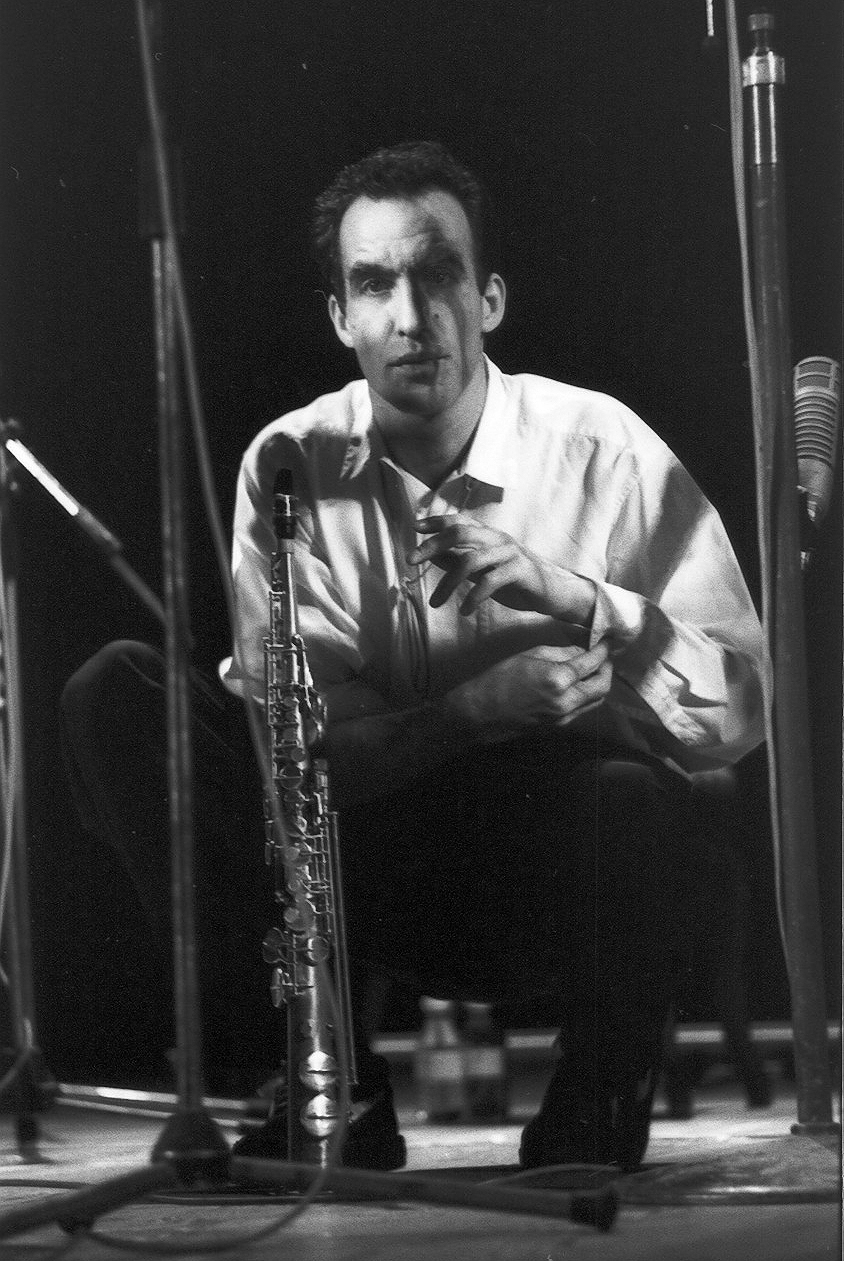
Lurie in 1992

Parallel to the final version of the Lounge Lizards in the early 1990s, Lurie formed a smaller group, the John Lurie National Orchestra. Lurie played alto and soprano saxes, Grant Calvin Weston played drums, and Billy Martin performed on congas, timbales, kalimba, and other small percussion. Unlike the tightly-arranged music of the Lounge Lizards, the Orchestra's music was heavily improvised and compositions were credited to all three musicians.

They released the album Men With Sticks (Crammed Discs 1993) and recorded music for the Fishing With John TV series. In February 2014 the Orchestra released The Invention of Animals, a collection of out-of-print studio tracks and unreleased live recordings from the '90s. Columnist Mel Minter wrote:

This new release may require a reassessment of Lurie the saxophonist because the playing is engagingly fluid, inventive, and visceral—and well worth revisiting. . . . The emotional immediacy of Lurie's playing – and that of his partners – makes for riveting stuff. Think of his sax not so much as a musical instrument, but instead, as a window with a clear view of his soul.

Jeff Jackson of Jazziz added, "The resulting music is delicate, primal and utterly gorgeous."

== Film and television ==
In 1993 Lurie composed the theme to Late Night with Conan O'Brien with Howard Shore. The theme was also used when O'Brien hosted on The Tonight Show. Lurie formed his own record label in 1998, Strange & Beautiful Music, and released the Lounge Lizards album Queen of All Ears and a Fishing with John soundtrack.

Lurie has written scores for over 20 movies, including Stranger than Paradise, Down by Law, Mystery Train, Clay Pigeons, Animal Factory, and Get Shorty, for which he received a Grammy Award nomination.

In the 1980s, Lurie starred in the Jim Jarmusch films Stranger Than Paradise and Down by Law, and made cameos in the films Permanent Vacation and Downtown 81. He went on to act in other notable films including Paris, Texas, Wild at Heart and The Last Temptation of Christ. From 2001 to 2003 he starred in the HBO prison series Oz as inmate Greg Penders.

Lurie wrote, directed and starred in the TV series Fishing with John in 1991, which featured guests Tom Waits, Willem Dafoe, Matt Dillon, Jim Jarmusch, and Dennis Hopper. It aired on IFC and Bravo. It has since become a cult classic and was released on DVD by Criterion.

In January 2021, Lurie's series Painting with John first aired on HBO. In June 2021, he announced that a second season of the show was planned and that for the first time in 22 years, he was rehearsing music for it. The third and final season of Painting with John, consisting of six episodes, first aired on June 2, 2023. Lurie's friend and fellow musician Flea appeared in one of the episodes.

== Painting ==
The skeleton in my closet has moved back out to the garden (2009)

Lurie has been painting since the 1970s. Most of his early works are in watercolor and pencil, but in the 2000s he began working in oil. In 2011, he said of his art, "My paintings are a logical development from the ones that were taped to the refrigerator 50 years ago."

His work has been exhibited since July 2003, when two pieces were shown at the Nolan/Eckman Gallery in New York City. He had his first solo gallery exhibition at Anton Kern Gallery in May and June 2004 and has subsequently been exhibited at Galerie Daniel Blau in Munich, Galerie Lelong in Zürich, the Galerie Gabriel Rolt in Amsterdam, the Basel International Art Fair at Roebling Hall and the P.S.1 Contemporary Art Center in New York, the Montreal Museum of Fine Arts, the NEXT Art Fair in Chicago, the Mudam Luxembourg, the Watari Museum of Contemporary Art in Tokyo, Gallery Brown in Los Angeles, and the University of the Arts in Philadelphia. The Museum of Modern Art has acquired some of his work for their permanent collection.

Lurie has released two art books. Learn To Draw, a compilation of black and white drawings, was published by Walther Konig in June 2006. A Fine Example of Art includes over 80 reproductions of his work and was published by powerHouse Books in 2008.

Lurie's watercolor painting Bear Surprise was enormously popular on numerous Russian websites in an Internet meme known as Preved.

== Personal life ==
=== Romantic relationships ===
Lurie has never married. He detailed many of his romantic relationships between the 1970s and 1990s in his 2021 memoir The History of Bones. In August 2010, Lurie was reported to be dating a woman named Jill Goodwin (b. 1979).

=== Health ===
Lurie became ill with neurological symptoms in 1994, and has experienced debilitating ill health since 2000. At one point he was told he had a year to live. During this time, he wrote in a mad dash until his brain fog got so severe that he had to stop writing.

He stated in a 2006 interview that he has "Advanced Lyme", referring to chronic Lyme disease. He has stated that his diagnosis was received from "eight different purveyors of contemporary medicine" after years of disagreement among his physicians. Lurie's illness prevents him from acting or performing music, so he spends his time painting.

=== Stalking incident ===
In August 2010, Tad Friend wrote a piece in The New Yorker about Lurie disappearing from New York to avoid a man named John Perry, who Friend said was stalking Lurie. In the online literary magazine The Rumpus, Rick Moody noted that Friend's profile in The New Yorker, nominally about Lurie and his art, was two-thirds to three-quarters about Perry, including a full page photo of Perry standing in front of one of his own paintings. Moody described Perry as a deceitful stalker capable of violence and was also critical of Friend's "ungenerous" characterization of Lurie's illness as a "mysterious disease."

In May 2011 Perry undertook a public hunger strike to protest The New Yorker characterizing him as a stalker. Commenting about the protest, Lurie said, "He's conducting a hunger strike a half block from my house to prove he's not a stalker." Lurie described the article as "wildly inaccurate," noting that its publication did not resolve anything and that "the situation continues."

Editor David Remnick said the piece in his magazine was "thoroughly reported and fact-checked." But in a letter to The New Yorker in August 2012, several interviewees claimed their words had been "twisted, misquoted, or ignored," and that "the man presented in the article [Lurie] is not the man that we know." In a February 2014 interview, Lurie told the Los Angeles Times, "What one would hope is that the beauty in the music and in the paintings can somehow transcend and invalidate the kind of sickness that led to the article being written as it was and the kind of irresponsibility that allowed it to be published."

=== Politics ===
In December 2023, Lurie condemned Israel's actions in Gaza as a "genocide" and Israel's apartheid system, stating on Twitter, "Apparently it is bad for your career to say you are opposed to genocide. But fuck it. I am opposed to genocide. I am opposed to apartheid. I am opposed to children having limbs amputated without anesthesia. You absolute fucks."

== Filmography ==
Year	Title	Role	Notes
1978	Rome '78	Unknown	
1979	Men in Orbit	Astronaut	Also writer, director
1980	Underground U.S.A.	Jack Smith	
1980	The Offenders	The Lizard	
1980	Permanent Vacation	Sax player	Also composer
1981	Downtown 81	Himself	
1981	Subway Riders	The Saxophonist	Also composer
1983	Variety	—N/a	Composer
1984	Stranger Than Paradise	Willie	Also composer
1984	Paris, Texas	Slater	
1985	Desperately Seeking Susan	Neighbor Saxophonist	
1986	Down by Law	Jack	Also composer
1988	The Last Temptation of Christ	James	
1988	Il piccolo diavolo	Cusatelli	English title: The Little Devil
1989	Mystery Train	—N/a	Composer
1990	Wild at Heart	Sparky	
1991	Fishing with John	Himself	Also creator, director, composer
1991	Keep It for Yourself	—N/a	Short film; composer
1992	John Lurie and the Lounge Lizards Live in Berlin 1991	Himself	Documentary
1993	Late Night with Conan O'Brien	—N/a	Composed title theme
1995	Get Shorty	—N/a	Composer
1995	Blue in the Face	—N/a	Composer
1996	Just Your Luck	Coker	
1996	Manny & Lo	—N/a	Composer
1997	Excess Baggage	—N/a	Composer
1998	New Rose Hotel	Distinguished Man	
1998	Lulu on the Bridge	—N/a	Composer
1998	Clay Pigeons	—N/a	Composer
2000	Sleepwalk	Frank	
2000	Animal Factory	—N/a	Composer
2001	SpongeBob SquarePants	Himself	Archival footage from Fishing With John (Episode: "Hooky")
2001–03	Oz	Greg Penders	12 episodes
2004	Tortured by Joy	Narrator	Short film
2005	Face Addict	—N/a	Composer
2010–11	Mobsters	Narrator	
2021-2023	Painting with John	Himself	Also creator, director

== Discography ==
=== John Lurie ===
as John Lurie National Orchestra

- Men with Sticks (Crammed Discs/Made to Measure, 1993)

as Marvin Pontiac

- The Legendary Marvin Pontiac: Greatest Hits (Strange and Beautiful Music, 1999)
- Marvin Pontiac: The Asylum Tapes (Strange and Beautiful Music, 2017)

=== Soundtracks ===
Albums

- The Days with Jacques (Sony Records, 1994)
- Excess Baggage (Prophecy, 1997)
- Fishing with John (recorded in 1991; Strange and Beautiful Music, 1998)

Other soundtrack releases

- Stranger than Paradise and The Resurrection of Albert Ayler (Crammed Discs/Made to Measure, 1986) 2–score compilation
- Down by Law and Variety (Crammed Discs/Made to Measure, 1987) 2–score compilation
- Mystery Train (Milan/RCA, 1989) split album with various artists
- Get Shorty (Verve, 1995) various artists album
- African Swim and Manny & Lo (Strange and Beautiful Music, 1999) 2–score compilation

=== Compilations ===
- The Invention of Animals (2014)

=== With Lounge Lizards ===
Studio albums

- Lounge Lizards (Editions EG/Polydor, 1981)
- No Pain for Cakes (Island, 1986)
- Voice of Chunk (VeraBra, 1988)
- Queen of All Ears (Strange and Beautiful Music, 1998)

Live albums

- Live from the Drunken Boat (Europe, 1983)
- Live: 1979–1981 (ROIR, 1985)
- Big Heart: Live in Tokyo (Island, 1986)
- Live in Berlin, Volume One (VeraBra, 1992)
- Live in Berlin, Volume Two (VeraBra, 1993)

=== Guest appearances ===
- Heartbeat by Ryuichi Sakamoto (Virgin Records, 1991); saxophone on "Lulu"
- Let's Go Everywhere by Medeski Martin & Wood (Little Monster, 2008); vocals on "The Squalb" (as Marvin Pontiac)
- One Hot Minute by Red Hot Chili Peppers (Warner Bros., 1995); harmonica on "One Hot Minute"
- Perfect Hair by Busdriver (Big Dada, 2014); Lurie painted the album cover art
- Rain Dogs by Tom Waits (Island Records, 1985); saxophone on "Walking Spanish"
- Saints by Marc Ribot (Atlantic, 2001); includes an arrangement of Lurie's "It Could Have Been Very Beautiful"
- Spillane by John Zorn (Elektra Nonesuch, 1987); spoken vocals on "Spillane"
- Winter Was Hard by Kronos Quartet (Nonesuch, 1988); includes an arrangement of Lurie's "Bella by Barlight"
