= Fantastic Spikes Through Balloon =

Studio album by Skeleton Key
- Released: March 25, 1997
- Length: 34:30
- Label: Capitol
- Producer: Skeleton Key, Dave Sardy, Eli Janney

Skeleton Key chronology
Skeleton Key EP (1996)	Fantastic Spikes Through Balloon (1997)	Obtainium (2002)

Fantastic Spikes Through Balloon is the debut studio album by the American rock band Skeleton Key, released in 1997 on Capitol Records. It was co-produced by the band with Dave Sardy, except "All the Things I've Lost" and "Big Teeth" produced by the band and Eli Janney, and "The Needle Never Ends" produced by the band only. The original album contains eleven songs, with four more songs released only on the Japanese edition. In 1998, a two-disc edition of the album was released in the United States, with the second disc containing alternative versions and remixes by DJ Spooky, Mark Linkous, JG Thirlwell and Dan the Automator.

The packaging was designed by Stefan Sagmeister and features photographs by Tom Schierlitz. It was nominated for the Grammy Award for Best Recording Package.

== Critical reception ==
Professional ratings
Review scores
Source	Rating
AllMusic	2.5/5 stars
Robert Christgau	(2-star Honorable Mention)

The New York Times wrote: "With its raucous precision, Skeleton Key touches on punk and funk, constructing lean, clattery vamps. It also harks back to Captain Beefheart's down-home surrealism and tips its hat to the circus-band waltzes of Kurt Weill via Tom Waits." The Dayton Daily News deemed the album "a quirky hodgepodge of megaphone vocals, tin-can percussion, jagged rhythms and bizarro sound effects."

== Track listing ==
1. "Watch the Fat Man Swing" – 3:27
2. "Wide Open" – 2:36
3. "Nod Off" – 3:19
4. "All the Things I've Lost" – 2:55
5. "The Only Useful Word" – 3:57
6. "The World's Most Famous Undertaker" – 3:05
7. "Vomit Ascot" – 1:53
8. "Dear Reader" – 3:16
9. "Scratch" – 2:37
10. "Big Teeth" – 3:36
11. "The Needle Never Ends" – 3:56

Japanese edition bonus tracks

12. "Solitaire" – 3:18
13. "You Might Drown" – 2:12
14. "Hoboerotica" – 1:22
15. "The Spreading Stain" – 3:36

Disc 2 (special edition)

12. "You Might Drown (Transistor Remix)" – 4:27
13. "All the Things I've Lost (Fast Version)" – 4:06
14. "Wide Open (DJ Spooky's Full Spectrum Mix)" – 5:32
15. "Nod Off" – 3:57
16. "Dear Reader" – 5:11
17. "Skeletons" – 5:01
18. "The Needle Never Ends" – 4:06
19. "Big Teeth" – 3:56
20. "Dear Reader (Unwonted Mix)" – 3:25
21. "Spreading Stain" – 5:13
22. "You Might Drown (Drum & Bass Remix)" – 5:45
23. "All the Things I've Lost (Slow Version)" – 3:52
24. "Nod Off (Version 1)" – 2:50

== Personnel ==
- Erik Sanko
- Stephen Calhoon
- Chris Maxwell
- Rick Lee
