= Bowery Electric =

American post-rock and shoegaze band

- Martha Schwendener (left) and Lawrence Chandler (right)

Background information
- Origin: New York City, US
- Genres: Shoegaze; trip hop; post-rock; drone-rock
- Years active: 1993–2000
- Labels: Beggars Banquet; Happy Go Lucky; Hi-Fidelity; Kranky
- Members: Lawrence Chandler; Martha Schwendener
- Past members: Jon Dale; Michael Johngren; Wayne Magruder

Bowery Electric was an American post-rock and shoegaze band formed in New York City in 1993 by Lawrence Chandler and Martha Schwendener. They released three albums beginning in 1995, including the critically praised Beat (1996). Their last recording was released in 2000.

== History ==
Formed by Lawrence Chandler and Martha Schwendener in late 1993, Bowery Electric played their first show in New York City in January 1994. The band's debut double 7-inch single was recorded by Kramer and released by Hi-Fidelity Recordings in 1994. After listening to it, Kranky contacted the band.

The band's first album, Bowery Electric, was recorded by Michael Deming at Studio .45 in Hartford, Connecticut, and released by Kranky in 1995. The album was included by Andrew Earles in his 2014 book Gimme Indie Rock: 500 Essential American Underground Rock Albums 1981–1996. In 2016, Pitchfork named it the 36th best shoegaze album of all time.

In 1996, the band released their second album, Beat. It includes the single "Fear of Flying". In 2016, Beat was reissued on vinyl as a 20th anniversary edition by Kranky.

Vertigo, a remix album of tracks from Beat, was released in 1997. Vertigo featured a roster of artists including Third Eye Foundation, Robert Hampson, Witchman and others.

In 2000, the band released an album, Lushlife, which was recorded at Electric Sound. The album peaked at number 14 on the CMJ Top 200 chart and number 11 on the Core Radio chart.

They have not performed or released any recordings as Bowery Electric since.

== Musical style ==
The band blended elements of shoegaze with trip hop rhythms, utilizing samplers, laptop production, and dub bass. In the November 1995 issue of The Wire, Simon Reynolds credited Bowery Electric and other kindred groups as developing "a distinctively American post-rock".

== Discography ==
=== Studio albums ===
- Bowery Electric (Kranky, 1995)
- Beat (Kranky, Beggars Banquet Records, 1996)
- Lushlife (Beggars Banquet Records, 2000)

=== Compilations ===
- Demo (2024)

=== Remix albums ===
- Vertigo (Beggars Banquet Records, 1997)

=== EPs ===
- Drop (Hi-Fidelity Recordings, 1994)

=== Singles ===
- "Fear of Flying" (Beggars Banquet Records, 1997)
- "Without Stopping - Witchman Mix (Hell or High Water Dub)" (Beggars Banquet Records, 1997)
- "Coming Down - Immersion Mix" (Beggars Banquet Records, 1997)
- "Blow Up" (Happy Go Lucky, 1997)
- "Floating World" (Beggars Banquet Records, 2000)
- "Freedom Fighter" (Beggars Banquet Records, 2000)

== Use of songs in media ==
=== Advertisements ===
- "Beat" was used in commercials for Puma and Michelin

=== Films ===
- All We are Saying ("Deep Sky Objects", "Freedom Fighter")
- Made in Britain ("Looped", "Low Density")
- The Mothman Prophecies ("Under the Sun")
- The Princess and the Gangster ("Lushlife")
- Transworld Skateboarding Anthology (“Fear of Flying”)
- Transworld Skateboarding Sixth Sense (“Fear of Flying”)
- Transworld Skateboarding Modus Operandi (“Shook Ones”)
- Automobilux (2007) (music from Bowery Electric) by Garret Linn

=== Television ===
- Behind the News ("Freedom Fighter")
- CKAL News at Noon ("Fear of Flying")
- Comic Relief ("Low Density")
- Deepwater Black ("Fear of Flying")
- Gardners from Hell ("Low Density")
- Ideal ("Over and Over", "Slow Thrills")
- Les histoires extraordinaires de Pierre Bellemare: Le virage d'Anna ("Soul City") - Season 2, Episode 18
- WNBC-TV Listen-Voices of the Future ("Beat", "Fear of Flying", "Floating World", "Freedom Fighter", "Over and Over", "Saved", "Under the Sun")
- MTV Real World/Road Rules Challenge ("Deep Blue", "Soul City") - Episode 406; ("Psalms of Survival") - Episode 416; ("After Landing", "Shook Ones") - Episode 504; ("Deep Blue", "Psalms of Survival", "Saved" ) - Episode 505; ("Lushlife") - Episode 506, Episode 916
- Moorgate Legacy ("Beat", "Low Density")
- Motorway Cops ("After Landing", "Beat", "Fear of Flying", "Passages", "Psalms of Survival")
- No Disco ("Freedom Fighter")
- Paris Modes TV ("Floating World")

== See also ==
- List of ambient music artists
