= Robb Webb =

American voice actor (1939–2021)

Nelson Robinette Webb (January 29, 1939 – February 3, 2021) was an American voice artist, best known as the voice of 60 Minutes and the CBS Evening News. He did voice overs for thousands of television spots.

Webb was from Whitesburg, Kentucky. In addition to his television work, he was the narrator for Fishing with John.

Five days after his 82nd birthday, Webb died from complications of COVID-19 in New York City amidst the COVID-19 pandemic in New York City.
