= Heather Eatman =

American journalist

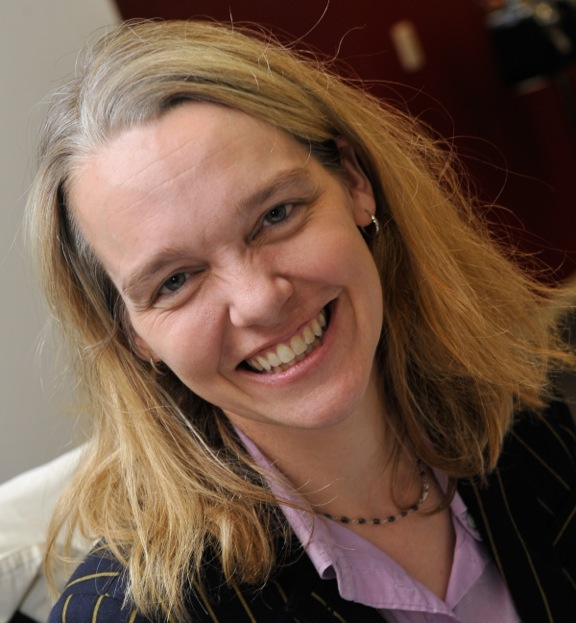
- At the Daily News, October 2012
- Born: November 22, 1968 (age 57); Jacksonville, Texas, United States
- Occupations: Singer-songwriter, illustrator, designer, web developer
- Website: heathereatman.net

Heather Eatman (born November 22, 1968, in Jacksonville, Texas, United States) is an American songwriter, singer, graphic artist, and portraitist, whose songs are "Gothic character studies closer in spirit to the fiction of Flannery O'Connor than conventional folk music, complete with lyrics possessing a real flair for poetic physical imagery." She has recorded four full-length albums, Mascara Falls (1995), Candy and Dirt (1998), Real (2001), and Gorgeous Maze (2020) in addition to 2015 singles "Angels in the Street," "Soul Highway," "Gold Ring," and 2020's "Red Wine." Baby Teeth, an EP (extended play) consisting of new recordings of some of her earliest songs, also appeared in 2015. She was Managing Editor/Design at the New York Daily News, where she was employed from 1991 to 2012. Eatman has been called "A gifted storyteller, whose casual narratives capture the seemingly settled fates of restless small-town dreamers and big-time losers, circus freaks and social geeks, with a bracing mix of compassion and detail." In May 2016, she produced "Because the Night," a multi-artist tribute to the music and poetry of one of her formative influences, Patti Smith, at Brooklyn's Union Hall.

== Background ==
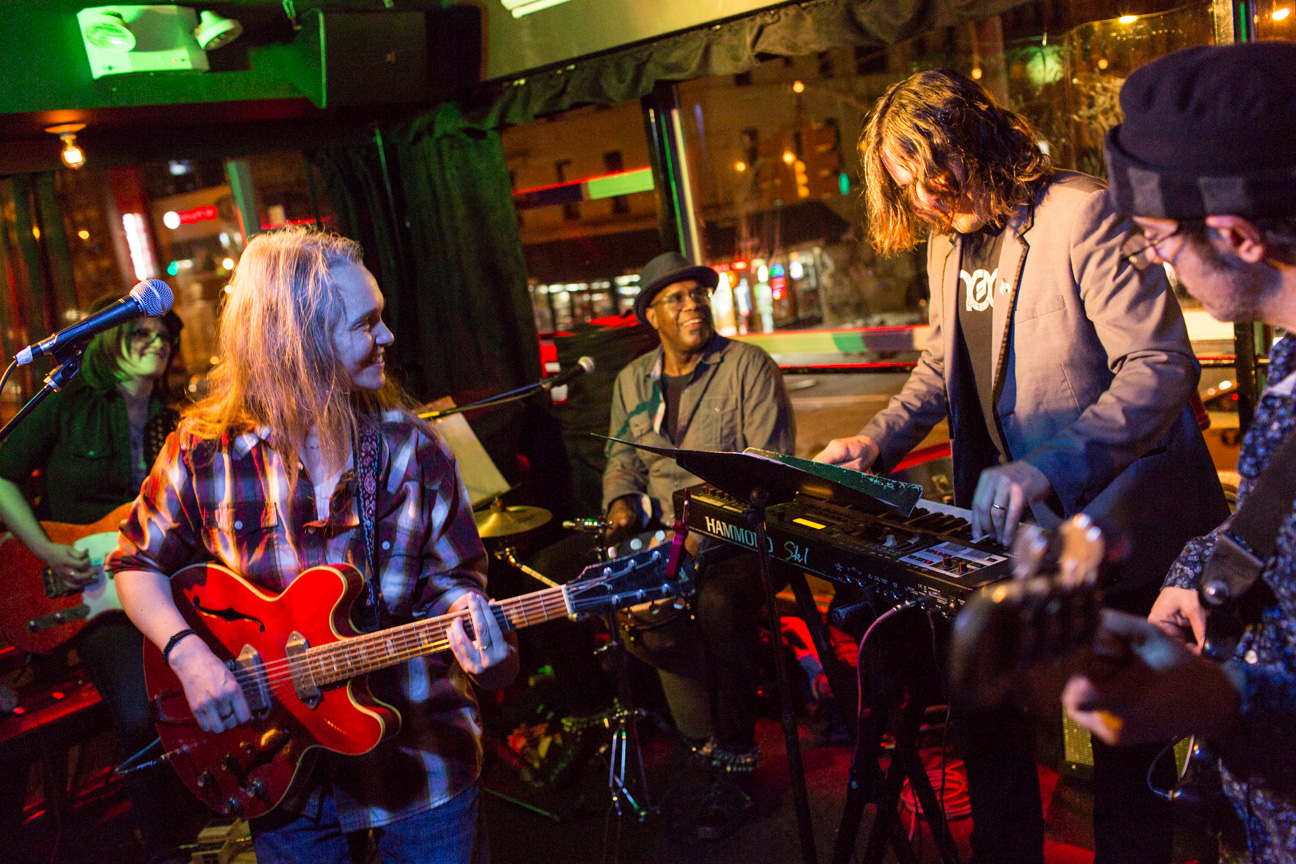
Heather Eatman and her band at Treehouse at 2A, New York City, March 13, 2016

Heather was born in the East Texas town of Jacksonville. She grew up in a theatrical household – her father directed plays at colleges in Texas, Michigan, and Pennsylvania – and she developed a strong affinity for the tragic, weary, memorable female characters of Tennessee Williams. Through her father, she was exposed to the plays of both Williams and the Russian playwright, Anton Chekhov. Their work helps account for Eatman's feel for imperiled women of a certain age. In fact, Eatman credits the theater with helping her overcome her shyness by demonstrating to her that she could create her own world through her songs....once onstage, she could manipulate the way she came across. In 1985, at the age of seventeen, Eatman relocated to New York City to attend Parsons School of Design, graduating with a BFA in illustration in 1990. While supporting herself at a series of odd jobs, she began singing at clubs in Manhattan's East Village and Lower East Side. At one of these gigs, she met Tom Lewis, an A & R rep for Oh Boy Records, an independent record company owned by singer-songwriter John Prine, who signed her to the label in 1993. Her first album, Mascara Falls, was released two years later in 1995. Heather subsequently toured the United States, opening for Prine, Billy Bragg, John Hiatt, Crash Test Dummies, Jill Sobule, Ferron, Donovan, Richie Havens, and Rosanne Cash, among others, performing at venues such as the Fillmore West in San Francisco, California and the Ryman Auditorium in Nashville, Tennessee, and appearing on The Conan O'Brien Show on September 20 of that year. Reviewing a performance in 1996, Los Angeles Times pop music writer Robert Hilburn said, "Her set was filled with an authority and individuality of vision...Unlike so many artists who walk in the thematic footsteps of obvious models [like Lou Reed, Rickie Lee Jones, and Nick Lowe], Eatman unveils new attitudes and ironies in songs that spring from such varied symbols as the King of Rock 'n' Roll and the Statue of Liberty. Most important, there is a sizable portion of Eatman originality in her music...it will be interesting to see how she expands on that freshness."

== Influences and artistic development ==
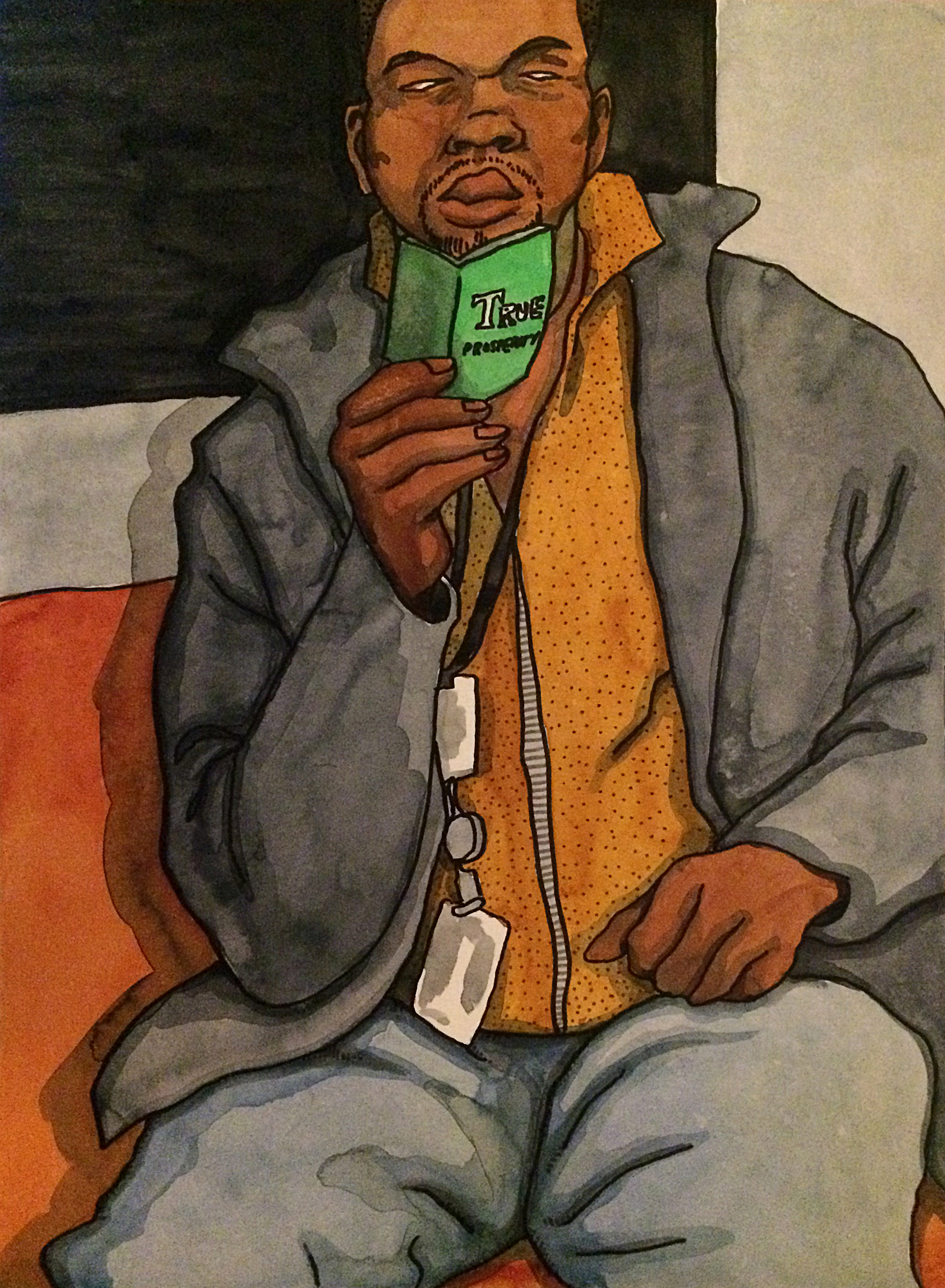
True Prosperity (2016)

In a 2002 interview with Perfect Sound Forever, Eatman described the music she grew up listening to as "a very strange amalgam," much of which came through her parents: Barbra Streisand, Neil Diamond, the Mamas & the Papas, Simon & Garfunkel, classical and religious music. Her father loved Broadway theater, so she also heard Stephen Sondheim, Leonard Bernstein, Jacques Brel, Cole Porter, and Rodgers and Hammerstein. As a teenager, however, she gravitated toward The Rolling Stones, The Beatles, Led Zeppelin, The Doors, Patti Smith, Lou Reed and The Velvet Underground, and, eventually, Tom Waits and Rickie Lee Jones; she has also spoken of her deep connection to the blues, including the work of Robert Johnson, Muddy Waters, John Lee Hooker, and Elmore James. Known for her story-songs, in her later writing, Eatman "became fascinated with melody, implied stories, and economy of words." Her 2015 work moved further away from linear narrative, and in the case of "Angels in the Street," released that February, toward a kind of incantatory surrealism, underlined by the accompanying video, which Eatman devised and produced herself. She also produced the video for her subsequent release, "Soul Highway."

== Journalism and later career ==
Eatman maintained her job at the New York Daily News, a tabloid newspaper, from 1991 to 2012. She began as an art assistant in the features department and was promoted steadily, switching over to producing breaking-news graphics in 1997 while also occasionally contributing articles. In an effort to take more control of her music career, Heather made the decision to manufacture and market the 1999 Candy & Dirt on her own Impossible Records label. Her May 2001 album, Real, was released on Eminent Records. Alanna Nash's review concluded, "Eatman is always hypnotically original, her imagery ('muscles, bones, thrown at the sky') haunting and new. The surprise is how powerfully she sucks you into the swirl, her whispered vocals, softer than pillow talk, perfectly poised between passion and pain. Unforgettable." Sales never matched the critical acclaim, however, and Eatman subsequently stopped recording and performing altogether, in 2008, when the Daily News promoted her to an executive position. Promoted again in 2011, to Managing Editor/Design, Eatman left the News in late 2012 to renew her artistic pursuits. She divides her time between her design company, Heather Eatman Creative, her painting (including an ongoing series of subway-rider portraits such as "True Prosperity," shown here) and her music and videos. In 2013, she returned to live performance in New York City, appearing regularly, both solo and with her band, at venues in Manhattan, Brooklyn, and elsewhere.

== Discography ==
Year	Title	Label	Number	Notes
1995	Mascara Falls	Oh Boy	OBR014	Album
1996	Women Live from Mountain Stage	Blue Plate	BPM308	Compilation, incl. "Half of a Woman"
1999	Candy & Dirt	Impossible	IMPR001	Album
2000	Indiegrrl Compilation, Vol. 2: A Benefit for MRPP	Indiegrrl	6276	Compilation, incl. "Nothing Is Stopping You"
2001	Real	Eminent	EM-25080-2	Album
2001	"Spoonful"	Eminent	EMP-20004-2	Single
2004	200 Cadillacs	Image	0733	Compilation, incl. "Too Tired to Be Elvis"
2015	"Angels in the Street"	Bandcamp		Single
2015	"Soul Highway"	Bandcamp		Single
2015	"Gold Ring"	Bandcamp		Single
2015	Baby Teeth	Impossible		EP, 5 songs
2020	"A Girl Like You"	Bandcamp		Single
2020	"Red Wine"	Bandcamp		Single
2020	Gorgeous Maze	Impossible	IMPR004	Album
