= Jacques Jarrige =

French sculptor and designer

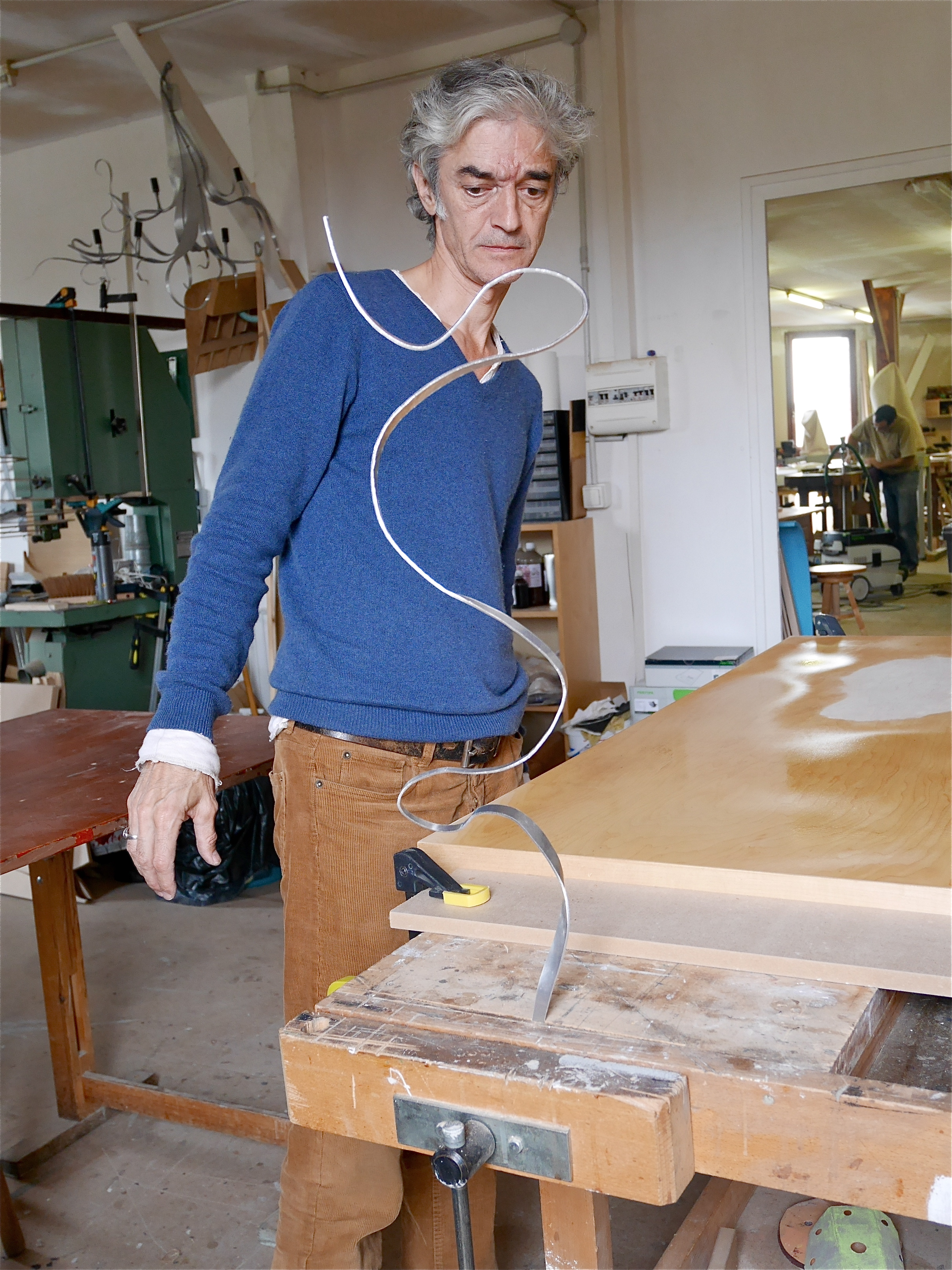
- Born: 1962 (age 63–64); Paris, France.
- Known for: Sculpture, Furniture Design
- Website: www.jacquesjarrige.com

Jacques Jarrige is a French sculptor and designer, born December 1962 in Paris, France, to a family of art collectors and scientists. His work is known for its fluid organic forms which are hand wrought from simple materials.

His works have been acquired by the Mobilier National, the Musée des Beaux-Arts d'Orléans, Fonds national d'art contemporain.

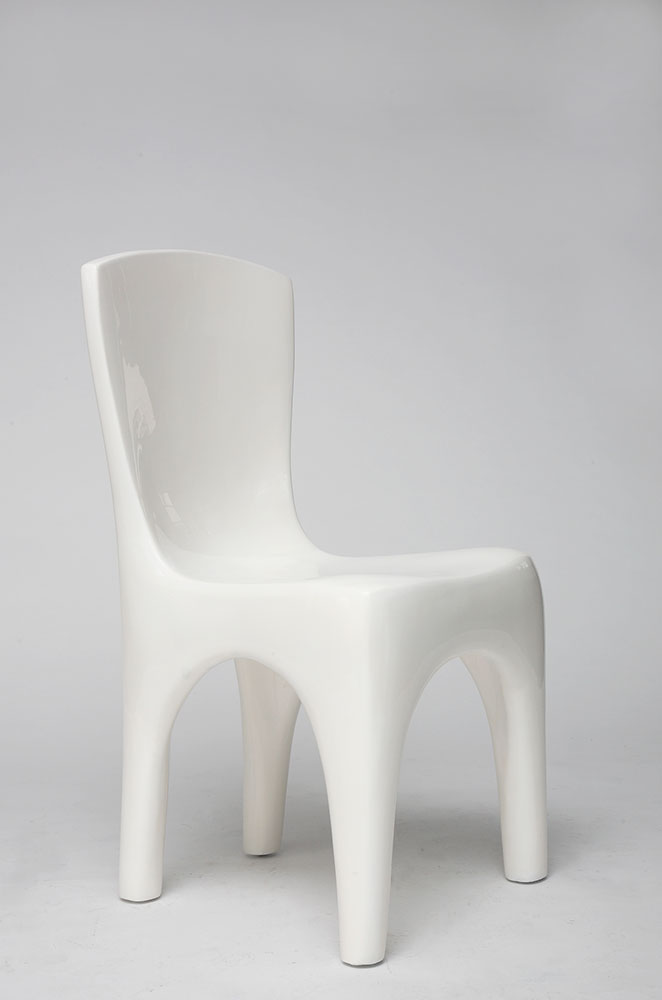
A chair

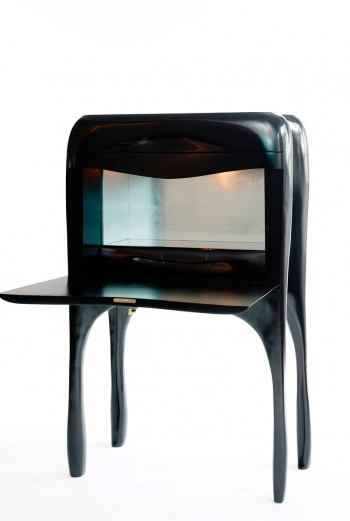
A desk

== Career ==
In the 80's, Jacques Jarrige studied architecture at the École des Beaux-Arts but abandoned those studies in favor of making functional sculpted objects and avant-garde furniture. Influenced by artists such as Henry Moore and Alexander Calder and the furniture of George Nakashima and Alexandre Noll, he began working with humble and raw materials — a practice he became known for — patiently shaping, molding, and altering them with simple hand tools.

In 1991, Jarrige was invited to join Frederic de Luca's influential avant-garde gallery En Attendant les Barbares. There, he was urged to push his work farther outside of traditional forms and experiment with his tactile approach. His work from this period was primarily sculptural furniture and design objects – exemplifying the combination of his direct and meticulous processes with a growing vernacular of organic and flowing shapes – and garnered him recognition in Europe throughout the 1990s.

Since 2010, after gaining representation with Valerie Goodman Gallery in New York, he has been regularly showing in the United States. This period, brought new approaches and his objects have become increasingly unconfined and dynamic — some furniture gives the impression of loose drawings in space — while his wood, aluminum and brass sculptures have grown in scale, while still retaining the quality of his particular creative process.

Concurrently, Jarrige started to experiment with making small jewelry as a way to stay busy while away from his studio. This work had a new formal aspect but spoke the same design language as his other work, just on a more intimate scale. He began to work directly within the limitations of the human body as a physical space, developing new forms to unify its lines and movements. The resulting bands and pendants are most often hammered metal pieces, evoking the sepals, petals, and stamen of flowers, pushing at and focusing attention toward the wearer. This work was first shown at MAD (Museum of Arts and Design) as part of The Loot Show, 2015.

These explorations in jewelry quickly informed new larger works as Jarrige began working less in the realm of design objects and furniture, and more in pure abstraction, which has quickly become the driving force of his practice. Between 2016 and 2018, large scale sculptures were installed in the French Consulate in New York, at the Queens Museum in two exhibitions curated by Vida Sabbaghi, in a municipal community center outside of Paris, in various private residences, and experimental art spaces such as the old Pfizer building in Brooklyn. With Valerie Goodman Gallery, he has also had four solo exhibitions.

He continues to exhibit internationally at galleries and institutions, in collaboration with Cope NYC at the Queens Museum and various public spaces. His designs have been featured in a number of publications, most recently in Architectural Digest, Cote Paris, House Beautiful, Worlds of Interiors, and the Wall Street Journal.

== Exhibitions ==
=== Solo exhibitions ===
- 2017 ROCA Rockland Center for the Arts - "Outdoor Sculptures. Curves #1, #2, #3"
- 2015 "Waves" installation, Pullman Miami - Installation Waves à Miami
- 2012 Aqua Art Fair, Miami
- 1998 Hôtel de ville de Paris / Salle Saint Jean, Paris
- 1989 Entrepôts de Bercy, Paris

=== Selected gallery shows ===
- 2010–2018 Valerie Goodman Gallery, NYC
- 2016 Galerie Avant-Scene, Paris
- 2009 Galerie Thierry Marchand, Paris
- 2006 Galerie Cat Berro, Paris
- 2002 Galerie Frédéric de Luca, Paris
- 1993 Galerie en Attendant les Barbares, Paris

=== Group exhibitions ===
- 2016 Kinetic sculpture Installation "Grand Mobile" at Acumen Building, Brooklyn curated by Vida Sabbaghi
- 2015 Queens Museum, NYC
- 2015 Museum of Arts and Design, Loot Show
- 2015 La Gaieté lyrique, CNAP Oracles du Design, Paris
- 2014 Queens Museum, NYC
- 2013 Galerie Lotte, Séoul
- 2013 Nomades, Paris
- 2011 Nomades, Paris
- 2005 Musée de Châteauroux, Châteauroux
- 2000 VIA, Paris
- 1994 Musée des Arts Décoratifs, Hamburg, Germany
- 1991 Musée de la Poste, Paris

=== Museum collections ===
- 2002 Mobilier National
- 2004 Musée des Beaux Arts, Orléans, France
- 2005 Centre National des Arts Plastiques (FNAC)

=== Collaborations ===
- 2014 Yun-Mo Ahn world tour "Become A Butterfly" www.becomeabutterfly.org
- 2019 Garret Linn "Jacques Jarrige: Or How I Lost My Blind Faith in Unreliable Narrators"

== Publications ==
- "The Searching Line"
- Esther Henwood, Design and Littérature: Une liaison inspirée (2009) Edition Norma ISBN 978-2-9155-4222-6
- Anny Bonny, Meubles et décors des années 80 (2011) Edition du regard ISBN 978-2841052226
