= Obtainium =

Studio album by Skeleton Key
- Released: June 24, 2002
- Genre: Rock
- Length: 40:52
- Label: Ipecac Recordings (CD) (IPC-029)
- Producer: Dubious Brothers

Skeleton Key chronology
Fantastic Spikes Through Balloon (1997)	Obtainium (2002)	Gravity is the Enemy (2012)

Professional ratings
Review scores
Source	Rating
AllMusic	3/5 stars
Robert Christgau	(3-star Honorable Mention)
Pitchfork Media	7.3/10

Obtainium is an album by Skeleton Key, released in 2002 by Ipecac Recordings. The image on the CD is a representation of the bones of the inner ear, including the cochlea. The name is a play on the fictional element unobtainium.

== Track listing ==
All tracks written by Skeleton Key.

1. "Sawdust" – 3:39
2. "One Way, My Way" – 3:31
3. "Candy" – 3:17
4. "Panic Bullets" – 3:28
5. "The Barker of the Dupes" – 3:14
6. "Kerosene" – 3:00
7. "Dingbat Revolution" – 2:23
8. "Roost in Peace" – 3:28
9. "King Know it All" – 3:03
10. "That Tongue" – 3:51
11. "Say Goodnight" – 7:50
