= Gravity Is the Enemy =

Gravity is the Enemy

Studio album by Skeleton Key
- Released: March 23, 2012
- Genre: Rock
- Length: 53:48
- Label: Arctic Rodeo Recordings
- Producer: Bryce Goggin

Skeleton Key chronology
Obtainium (2002)	Gravity is the Enemy (2012)

Gravity is the Enemy is an album by Skeleton Key, released in 2012 by Arctic Rodeo Recordings. On March 7, 2012 the band released a promotional video for the new album.

== Track listing ==
All tracks written by Skeleton Key.

1. "Gravity is the Enemy" – 4:15
2. "Museum Glass" – 4:12
3. "Human Pin Cushion" – 3:35
4. "Little Monster" – 4:00
5. "Iron Fist Alchemist" – 4:17
6. "I'll Walk You To The Door" – 1:56
7. "The Mowing Devil" – 4:07
8. "Everybody's Crutch" – 4:23
9. "Fear of Stalling" – 3:20
10. "The Denialist" – 3:45
11. "Machine Screw" – 3:14
12. "Every Hero" – 2:55
13. "Spineless" – 3:20
14. "Roses" – 6:29
