= Lawrence Chandler =

- Born: Lawrence Dean Chandler; 27 November 1961 (age 64); High Point, North Carolina, U.S.
- Education: University of North Carolina; Columbia University; Juilliard School; Goldsmiths
- Genres: Ambient; contemporary classical; electronic; experimental; minimalism
- Occupations: Composer, musician, producer, sound artist
- Instruments: Electronics; guitar; piano; synthesizer
- Years active: 1994–present
- Labels: Beggars Banquet Records, Dreamland Recordings, Kranky, Happy Go Lucky, Hi-Fidelity Recordings, Rocket Girl, Sonic Cathedral, Untitled Recordings
- Formerly of: Bowery Electric, Happy Families

Lawrence Dean Chandler (born 27 November 1961) is a British-American composer, musician, producer and sound artist based in London. Best known as a founding member of seminal New York duo Bowery Electric, he works in ambient, contemporary classical, electronic and experimental styles.

== Life and career ==
Chandler studied English and Comparative Literature at Columbia University’s Graduate School of Arts and Sciences before pursuing formal training in music composition. Following Bowery Electric's final tour in 2000, he took a hiatus during which he studied composition privately with La Monte Young and Pauline Oliveros, with Conrad Cummings at The Juilliard School, worked for Philip Glass and completed a Master of Music in Composition from Goldsmiths College in London.

He returned in 2009 with Everybody Here Is Fine, commissioned for Make Music New York and premiered at The Bell House, Brooklyn on 21 June 2009. Subsequent works include: Music for Rock Ensemble, commissioned for 50 Years of Minimalism, premiered by Chandler, Katia and Marielle Labèque and ensemble at Kings Place, London on 26 November 2011;The Tuning of the World, a realisation of his evolving 24-hour, 24 part, sustained tone composition (Untitled Recordings, 2012); The Tuning of the World 2; and The Tuning of the World 2 (Deep Listening Version) (Untitled Recordings, 2025).

== Compositions ==
Chamber

- 2008 Duo, for two violins
- 2008 Quartet, for string quartet
- 2009 Fragment, for string quartet

Dance

- 2000 The Tea House, choreographed by Beyhan Murphy, Modern Dance Turkey, London
- 2008 Tide, choreographed by Myra Bazell, Scrap Performance Group, Philadelphia

Electronic

- 2002 Bleak House, for electronic percussion and electronically processed sounds
- 2002 Consistent Histories, for piano, turntable, vinyl record, electronically processed sounds
- 2002 Cross Country, for electronic percussion and electronically processed sounds
- 2002 Don't Leave a Light On, for electronic percussion and electronically processed sounds
- 2002 Heated Driveway, for electronic percussion and electronically processed sounds
- 2002 Hollow Sidewalk, for electronic percussion and electronically processed sounds
- 2002 Now and Later, for electronic percussion and electronically processed sounds
- 2002 Plus Time, for turntable, vinyl record, electronically processed sounds
- 2002 Sealed Air, for turntable, vinyl record, electronically processed sounds
- 2002 Thought for the Day, for piano, turntable, vinyl record, electronically processed sounds
- 2009 Everybody Here Is Fine, for electronics
- 2011 I Saw Satan Fall Like Lightning, for electronics, commissioned and released by Dreamland Recordings
- 2012 A Minute is as Long as it Lasts, for electronics, for Minute of Listening, Sound and Music, London
- 2012 The Tuning of the World, for sine wave generators
- 2025 The Tuning of the World 2, for electronics
- 2025 The Tuning of the World 2 (Deep Listening Version), for electronics

Ensemble

- 2011 Music for Rock Ensemble, for ensemble and electronics
- 2012 As Soft as Possible, for ensemble, commissioned for Quiet Music Ensemble, Dublin

Film

- 2007 Men Boxing, for violin and cello, collaboration with New York Miniaturist Ensemble for early film by Thomas Edison, Museum of the Moving Image, New York

Installations

- 2003 Plus Time, sound environment, multimedia collaboration with Brian Alfred, Sandroni Rey Gallery, New York
- 2006 To Be Held for a Long Time, sound environment, for SEAMUS Electro-Acoustic Music Month, New York
- 2011 The Upper Room, site-specific sound and light environment, The Marlborough Pop-Up Gallery, London

Piano

- 2008 Figures
- 2008 Etude No. 5
- 2009 Etude No. 10

Theatre

- 2012 1’41", for string quartet and/or electronics, commissioned for 101 New Music Theatre, Birmingham

Vocal

- 2009 China, for bass voice and piano, text by Bob Perelman

== Discography ==
Solo

- The Tuning of the World (Untitled Recordings, 2012)
- Don't Leave a Light On (Untitled Recordings, 2024)
- Consistent Histories (Untitled Recordings, 2024)
- The Tuning of the World 2 (Untitled Recordings, 2025)
- The Tuning of the World 2 (Deep Listening Version) (Untitled Recordings, 2025)

Bowery Electric

Happy Families

- 'New Forgetting' (Sonic Cathedral, 2013)

== Other musical activities ==
- Dream House (1994–1996, 2008), monitor, light and sound installation by La Monte Young and Marian Zazeela
- Experimental Audio Research (EAR) (1996), collaboration with Pete Kember, Kevin Shields and others, live performance at Westbeth Theater Center, New York on 3 September 1996
- Brooklyn Rider Plays Philip Glass by Brooklyn Rider (2008), assistant engineer, The Looking Glass Studio, New York
- Philip Glass Soundtracks by Michael Riesman (2008), assisted, The Looking Glass Studio, New York
- Basket Rondo World Premiere by Meredith Monk (2007), live sound, Paula Cooper Gallery, New York
- Deep Listening (2009), workshop with Pauline Oliveros, Dartington International Summer School, near Totnes
- Perfect Sound Forever (2017), guest DJ, NTS Radio, London on 18 October 2017
