= David Tronzo =

American guitarist (born 1957)

- Born: December 13, 1957 (age 68); Rochester, New York, U.S.
- Genres: Jazz, pop, rock, experimental
- Occupation: Musician
- Instrument: Guitar
- Years active: 1972–present

David Tronzo (born 1957) is an American guitarist, best known for his innovation of pairing the techniques of electric slide guitar with the genres of bebop, modern jazz, rock, downtown music, and experimental music. He has recorded with former David Bowie guitarist Reeves Gabrels, Wayne Horvitz, David Sanborn, and The Lounge Lizards.

== Biography ==
David Tronzo was born in 1957 in Rochester, New York. He was drawn to music at age eleven and decided on guitar by age thirteen and taught himself. By age fifteen he was playing gigs. "I was playing five nights a week, though I really just had three good notes and five good chords." He credits rock music as an early influence.

He lived in New York City from 1979 to 2002. As Visiting Artist at Berlin's Hochschule der Künste (HdK), his technique on the slide guitar was documented in two doctoral theses in Germany, in 1995 and 2001. He has also been an Artist in Residence at the Haystack Mountain School of Crafts in Maine.

He appeared in the movie Talking Guitars as himself in 2007. His work has also appeared on the soundtracks of two films: Short Cuts in 1993 and Excess Baggage in 1997.

Tronzo has been an associate professor at the Berklee College of Music since 2003.

== Awards and honors ==
- 1993 Voted one of the Top 100 Guitarists of the 20th Century in Musician magazine Press Poll
- 1994 Voted one of the Top Ten Jazz Guitarists by Musician magazine
- 1995 Voted second in its 1995 poll for Best Experimental Guitarist by Guitar Player magazine

== Discography ==
=== As leader ===
- Roots (Knitting Factory, 1994)
- Night in Amnesia with Reeves Gabrels (Upstart, 1995)
- Crunch (Love Slave, 1999)
- Scratchy Monsters, Laughing Ghosts with Stephen Vitiello (New Albion, 2005)
- The Light and Other Things (Creative Nation Music, 2007)

=== As member ===
- Queen of All Ears, Lounge Lizards (Strange & Beautiful Music, 1998)
- Redemption, Slow Poke (Intuition, 1999)
- At Home, Slow Poke (Palmetto, 2007)
- V16, V16 (2003)
- The Sonic Temple Monday and Tuesday, V16 (2007)
- Vancouver '08, V16 (2008)
- 100 Years of Flight, Club D'Elf (KUFALA, 2005)
- Gravity All Nonsense Now, Club D'Elf (KUFALA, 2005)
- Now I Understand, Club D'Elf (Accurate, 2006)
- Electric Moroccoland/So Below, Club D'Elf (Face Pelt, 2011)

=== As sideman ===
- Another Hand, David Sanborn (1991)
- Life's Too Short, Marshall Crenshaw (1991)
- Live at the Knitting Factory, John Zorn (1992)
- Phillip Johnston's Big Trouble, Phillip Johnston (1992)
- Last Day on Earth, John Cale/Bob Neuwirth (1994)
- Time Was, Curtis Stigers (1995)
- Travel On, Julian Dawson (1995)
- Walking on Locusts, John Cale (1996)
- An American Diary Vol. 2, Mike Mainieri (1999)
- Candy and Dirt, Heather Eatman (1999)
- Tender Trap, Janis Siegel (1999)
- Written in Red, Louise Taylor (2000)
- Real, Heather Eatman (2001)
- Dime Grind Palace, Sex Mob (2003)
- You Inspire Me, Curtis Stigers (2003)
