= The Lounge Lizards =

American Jazz band

- Origin: New York City, U.S.
- Genres: Avant-garde jazz, no wave
- Years active: 1978–1998
- Labels: EG, Europa, Antilles, Strange and Beautiful
- Past members: Anton Fier; Arto Lindsay; Billy Martin; Bryan Carrott; Calvin Weston; Curtis Fowlkes; Dana Vicek; David Tronzo; Dougie Bowne; E. J. Rodriguez; Erik Sanko; Evan Lurie; Jane Scarpantoni; John Lurie; Marc Ribot; Michael Blake; Michele Navazio; Oren Bloedow; Roy Nathanson; Steve Piccolo; Steven Bernstein

The Lounge Lizards were an American musical group founded by saxophonist John Lurie and his brother, pianist Evan Lurie, in 1978. They emerged from the No Wave musical scene, and are broadly classified as jazz though their music was eclectic and grew in a range of influences.

Initially they were known for their ironic, tongue-in-cheek “fake jazz” but the Lounge Lizards eventually became a showcase for John Lurie's sophisticated compositions straddling jazz and many other genres. They were active until about 1998 with the Lurie brothers as the only constant members, though many leading New York City based musicians were members of the group.

The group's name was borrowed from American slang. A lounge lizard is typically depicted as a well-dressed man who frequents the establishments in which the rich gather with the intention of seducing a wealthy woman with his flattery and deceptive charm.

== History ==
At its founding, the band consisted of John Lurie and Evan Lurie, guitarist Arto Lindsay, bassist Steve Piccolo, and percussionist Anton Fier. Though partly inspired by jazz, John Lurie said he used guitarists in the band "to foil the music when it gets too jazzlike". They released their first album, Lounge Lizards, on EG Records in 1981, produced by Teo Macero. The album included two Thelonious Monk covers, but as one critic noted, "the two aforementioned Monk covers seem a strange choice when you actually hear the band, which has more in common with sonic experimentalists like Ornette Coleman or Sun Ra." John Lurie later said this version of the band broke up due in part to creative tensions exacerbated by conflicts with EG Records executives, and in part due to his growing belief "that what we were doing was maybe phony".

A transitional version of the band for about a year in 1982–83 featured the Lurie brothers, with bassist Tony Garnier, trombonist Peter Zummo and drummer Dougie Bowne, augmented by other musicians depending on availability (e.g., bassist Fred Hopkins substituted for Garnier during a short tour). This version of the Lounge Lizards released one live album.

By the mid-1980s, a new lineup included bassist Erik Sanko, trombonist Curtis Fowlkes, guitarist Marc Ribot, saxophonist Roy Nathanson, and percussionists Bowne and E.J. Rodriguez. This group recorded various live and studio albums and showcased John Lurie's increasingly sophisticated and multi-layered compositions. John Lurie noted their music in this era was inspired by diverse sources such as "James Brown to Balinese music, from Varèse to Coltrane".

The band's 1987 music video Big Heart was featured on the adult animation The Brothers Grunt.

In 1998, the band released Queen of All Ears on John Lurie's Strange and Beautiful Music label and had added Steven Bernstein, Michael Blake, Oren Bloedow, David Tronzo, Calvin Weston, and Billy Martin. "The Lizards' music isn't jazz," said Fred Bouchard of JazzTimes, "but it is intelligent and rhythmically and harmonically interesting (it ain't rock either, in other words) and, despite the ultra-hip trappings, it has an almost innocent directness that can transcend stylistic prejudice."

The Lounge Lizards have been inactive since about 2000. John Lurie has been occupied with painting, while Evan has worked on The Backyardigans, a children's show that highlights multiple musical genres.

== Personnel ==
John Lurie estimates about 80 musicians recorded or performed with the Lounge Lizards. Performers included:

- John Lurie - alto/soprano saxophone
- Evan Lurie - piano, organ
- Arto Lindsay - guitar
- Steve Piccolo - bass
- Anton Fier - drums
- Dana Vlcek - guitar
- Danny Rosen - guitar
- Peter Zummo - trombone
- Tony Garnier - bass
- Dougie Bowne - drums
- Fred Hopkins - bass
- Roy Nathanson - saxophone
- Curtis Fowlkes - trombone
- Marc Ribot - guitar, trumpet, Eb horn
- Erik Sanko - bass
- Tony Moreno - drums
- E.J. Rodriguez - percussion
- Brandon Ross - guitar
- Al MacDowell - bass
- Calvin Weston - drums
- Michael Blake - saxophone
- Steven Bernstein - trumpet
- Billy Martin - percussion
- Jane Scarpantoni - cello
- Bryan Carrott - marimba, vibes
- Michele Navazio - guitar
- Oren Bloedow - bass
- David Tronzo - guitar
- Ben Perowsky - percussion
- Tony Scherr - bass
- Doug Wieselman - guitar, clarinet
- Mauro Refosco - percussion
- John Medeski - organ
- Kenny Wollesen - drums
- Jaime Scott - guitar
- Danny Blume - guitar
- Clark Gayton - trombone

== Discography ==
=== Studio albums ===
| Title | Release date |
|---|---|
| Lounge Lizards | 1981 |
| No Pain for Cakes | 1987 |
| Voice of Chunk | 1988 |
| Queen of All Ears | 1998 |

=== Live albums ===
| Title | Release date |
|---|---|
| Live from the Drunken Boat | 1983 |
| Live 79-81 | 1985 |
| Big Heart: Live in Tokyo | 1986 |
| Live in Berlin 1991 Vol. I | 1991 |
| Live in Berlin 1991 Vol. II | 1992 |
