= Evan Lurie =

American composer and musician (born 1954)

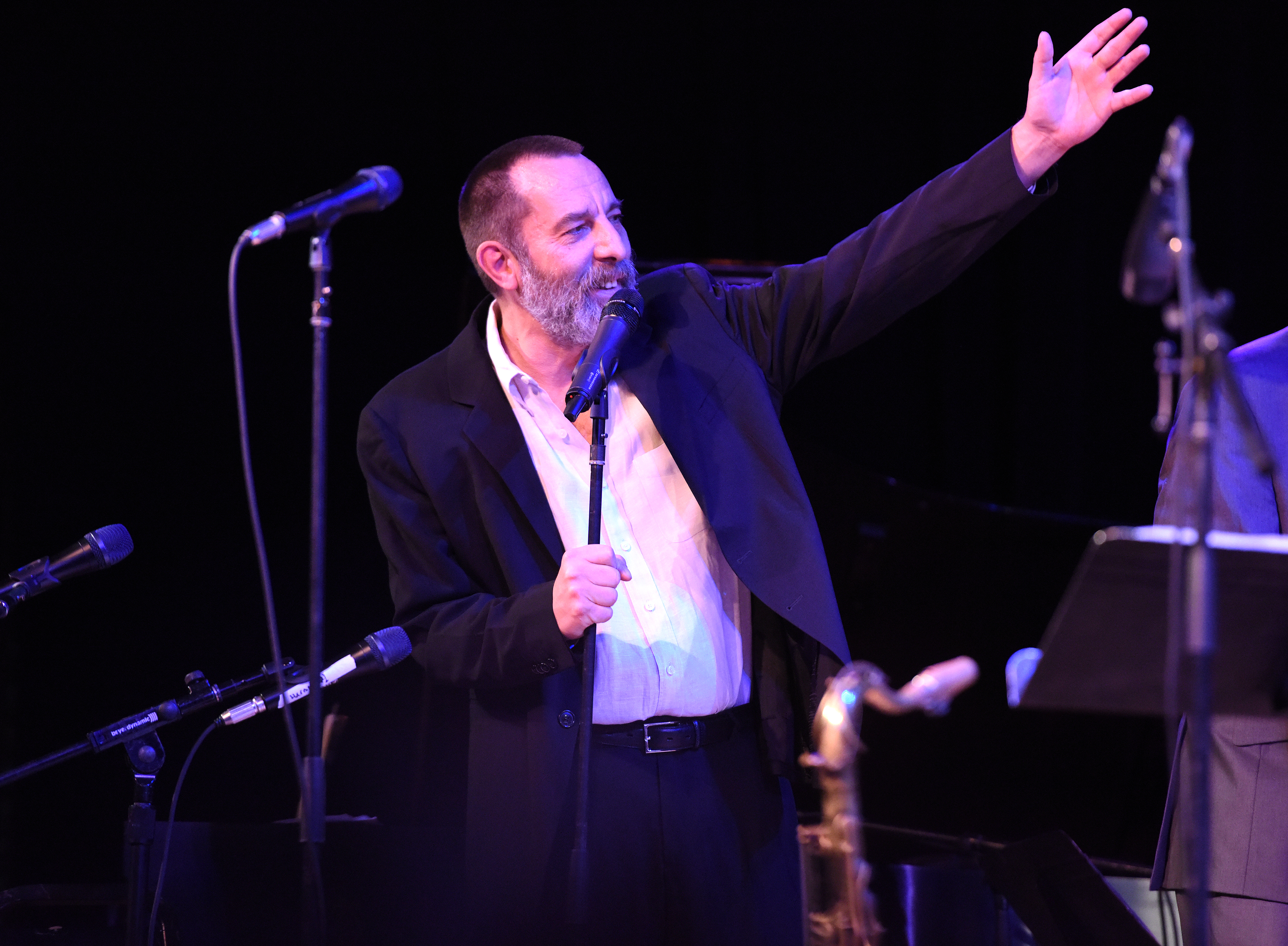
- Lurie in 2014
- Born: 1954 (age 71–72); Minneapolis, Minnesota, U.S.
- Occupations: Composer; musician
- Years active: 1978–present
- Known for: The Lounge Lizards
- Relatives: John Lurie (brother)

Evan Lurie (born 1954 in Minneapolis, Minnesota, United States) is an American composer and musician. Playing piano and occasionally organ, Evan was a founding member of the band the Lounge Lizards, along with his saxophonist brother John Lurie.

Lurie began studying composition with Julius Eastman in the early 1980’s. Eastman had approached him saying, "Don’t you play with the Lounge Lizards? I want to meet their keyboard player".

In 1985 he formed a quintet to perform his compositions for bandoneon. The quintet (including Jill Jaffe - violin, Marc Ribot - guitar and Alfredo Pedernera - bandoneon) released two recordings: Pieces for Bandoneon in 1987 and Selling Water by the Side of the River in 1990.

Lurie started producing music for Nickelodeon in 2001, as the composer for their show Oswald. He was later the music director for all four seasons of the Nick Jr. series The Backyardigans, which features a different musical genre in every episode. In 2011, Lurie composed an unused song for Nickelodeon's Winx Club (a show that many other Backyardigans crew members worked on, including creator Janice Burgess).

Other notable productions he has written music for include Joe Gould's Secret (2000) and Steve Buscemi's Trees Lounge (1996).

== Discography ==
- Happy? Here? Now? (1985, solo)
- Pieces for Bandoneon (1987)
- Selling Water by the Side of the River (1990)
- How I Spent My Vacation (1998, with Greg Cohen, Ben Perowsky, Marc Ribot, Steven Bernstein, Bryan Carrott, Jane Scarpantoni)

With The Lounge Lizards: see The Lounge Lizards Discography

== Filmography ==
- Stanley Tucci: Searching for Italy (2021–present TV series)
- Final Portrait (2017)
- Silver Linings Playbook (2012, "Popeye's Clog" and "Devil Tango" only)
- Winx Club (2011, Nickelodeon version)
- Jack Goes Boating (2010)
- Interview (2007)
- Face Addict (2005 documentary)
- Lonesome Jim (2005)
- The Backyardigans (2004 TV series)
- The Whole Shebang (2001)
- Oswald (2001 TV series)
- Fear of Fiction (2000)
- Lisa Picard is Famous (2000)
- Happy Accidents (2000)
- Joe Gould's Secret (2000)
- Side Streets (1998)
- OK Garage (1998)
- Homo Heights (1998)
- Inferno (1997)
- Office Killer (1997)
- Trees Lounge (1996)
- Phinehas (1996 short)
- Layin' Low (1996)
- The Salesman and Other Adventures (1995 short)
- The Monster (1994)
- The Night We Never Met (1993)
- Under Cover of Darkness (1992)
- Johnny Stecchino (1991)
- The Kill-Off (1989)
- Kizu (1988)
- Il piccolo diavolo (1988)
- Chōchin (1987)
- The Kitchen Presents Two Moon July (1986 documentary)
- Doomed Love (1983)
- Subway Riders (1981)
