= List of British films of 2016 =

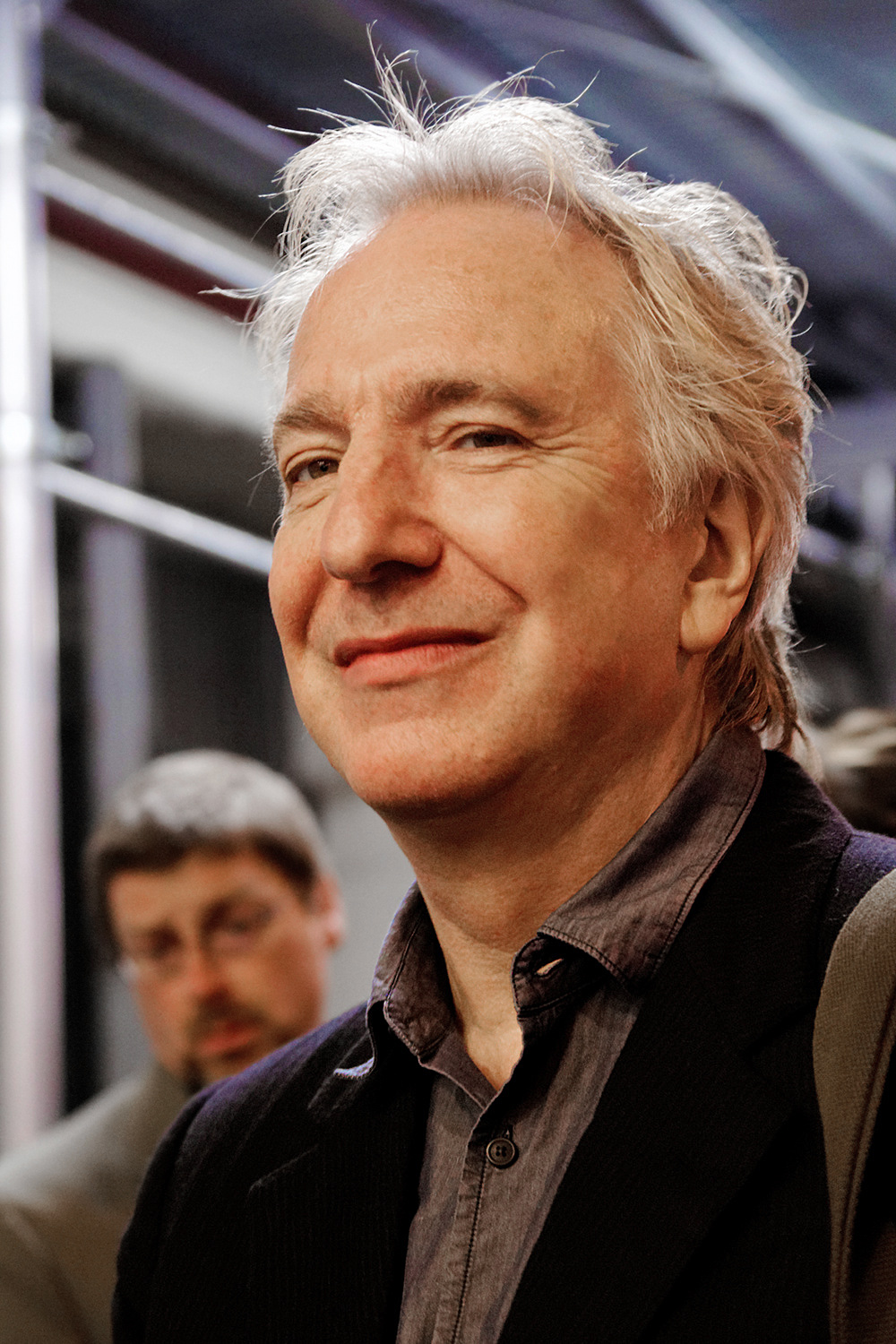
2016 saw the death of Alan Rickman.

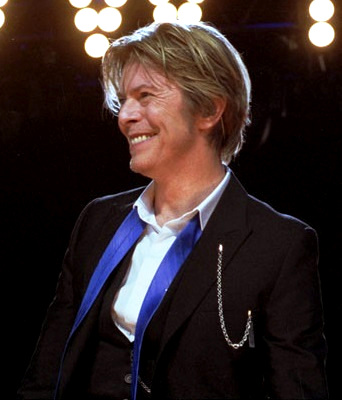
It also saw the death of David Bowie.

This article lists feature-length British films and full-length documentaries that have had their premieres in 2016 and were at least partly made by Great Britain or the United Kingdom. It does not feature short films, medium-length films, made-for-TV films, pornographic films, filmed theater, VR films and interactive films. It does not include films screened in previous years that had release dates in 2016.

Also included is an overview of the major events in British film, including film festivals and awards ceremonies, as well as a list of notable British film artists who died in 2016.

== Film premieres ==
=== January – March ===
Opening		Title	Cast and crew	Details	Genre(s)	Ref.
J A N U A R Y	1	The Fall of the Krays	Director: Zackary Adler; Cast: Simon Cotton, Kevin Leslie	Signature Entertainment; Sequel to The Rise of the Krays; Based on the lives of Ronnie and Reggie Kray	Crime	
J A N U A R Y	8	Set the Thames on Fire	Director: Ben Charles Edwards; Cast: Michael Winder, Max Bennett, Noel Fielding	Based on characters created by Ben Charles Edwards and Al Joshua	Science fiction Fantasy film Comedy drama	
J A N U A R Y	15	Breakdown	Director: Jonnie Malachi; Cast: Craig Fairbrass, James Cosmo, Emmett J. Scanlan, Mem Ferda	Soda Pictures	Thriller	
J A N U A R Y	21	Pride and Prejudice and Zombies	Director: Burr Steers; Cast: Lily James, Sam Riley, Jack Huston, Bella Heathcote, Douglas Booth, Matt Smith, Charles Dance, Lena Headey	Lionsgate; Based on Pride and Prejudice and Zombies by Seth Grahame-Smith (Co-produced by United States)	Period zombie horror	
J A N U A R Y	22	The Lovers and the Despot	Directors: Robert Cannan, Ross Adam	Soda Pictures	Documentary	
J A N U A R Y	23	Christine	Director: Antonio Campos; Cast: Rebecca Hall, Michael C. Hall, Tracy Letts, Maria Dizzia, J. Smith-Cameron, John Cullum	Curzon Artificial Eye; Based on the life of Christine Chubbuck (Co-produced by United States)	Biographical drama	
J A N U A R Y	23	Let's Be Evil	Director: Martin Owen; Cast: Isabelle Allen, Jamie Bernadette, Kara Tointon, Elliot James Langridge, Elizabeth Morris	Vertigo Releasing, Signature Entertainment	Sci-fi horror	
J A N U A R Y	23	Under the Shadow	Director: Babak Anvari; Cast: Narges Rashidi, Avin Manshadi	Vertigo Releasing (Co-produced by Jordan and Qatar)	Horror	
J A N U A R Y	24	The Eagle Huntress	Director: Otto Bell; Starring: Aisholpan Nurgaiv	Sony Pictures Classics; Based on the life of Aisholpan Nurgaiv (Co-produced by Kazakhstan and United States)	Documentary	
J A N U A R Y	24	Notes on Blindness	Directors: Peter Middleton, James Spinney	Artificial Eye; Based on the life of John M. Hull	Documentary	
J A N U A R Y	24	Sing Street	Director: John Carney; Cast: Ferdia Walsh-Peelo, Lucy Boynton, Jack Reynor	Lionsgate (Co-produced by Ireland and United States)	Musical coming-of-age comedy-drama	
J A N U A R Y	25	Complete Unknown	Director: Joshua Marston; Cast: Rachel Weisz, Michael Shannon	Sony Pictures Worldwide Acquisitions (Co-produced by United States)	Drama; Mystery; Thriller	
J A N U A R Y	26	Eddie the Eagle	Director: Dexter Fletcher; Cast: Taron Egerton, Hugh Jackman, Christopher Walken, Jim Broadbent	Lionsgate; Based on the life of Eddie Edwards (Co-produced by Germany and United States)	Comedy biopic	
J A N U A R Y	26	Uncle Howard	Director: Aaron Brookner; Starring: Howard Brookner, Aaron Brookner, Jim Jarmusch, Sara Driver, Tom DiCillo, William S. Burroughs, James Grauerholz, Robert Wilson	Lionsgate; Based on the life of Howard Brookner (Co-produced by United States)	Documentary	
J A N U A R Y	27	Ali and Nino	Director: Asif Kapadia; Cast: Adam Bakri, María Valverde	Based on Ali and Nino by Kurban Said	Romantic drama	
F E B R U A R Y	1	Hail, Caesar!	Directors: Joel and Ethan Coen; Cast: Josh Brolin, George Clooney, Ralph Fiennes, Jonah Hill, Scarlett Johansson, Frances McDormand, Tilda Swinton, Channing Tatum	Universal Pictures (Co-produced by United States)	Comedy	
F E B R U A R Y	5	Dad's Army	Director: Oliver Parker; Cast: Bill Nighy, Catherine Zeta-Jones, Toby Jones, Tom Courtenay, Michael Gambon	Universal Pictures; Based on the Dad's Army television series	War comedy	
F E B R U A R Y	12	War on Everyone	Director: John Michael McDonagh; Cast: Alexander Skarsgård, Michael Peña, Tessa Thompson, Caleb Landry Jones, Theo James	Icon Film Distribution	Black comedy Buddy cop	
F E B R U A R Y	13	Native	Director: Daniel Fitzsimmons; Cast: Rupert Graves, Ellie Kendrick, Leanne Best, Joe McAuley, Pollyanna McIntosh Daniel Brocklebank, Ian Hart	Miracle Films	Science fiction	
F E B R U A R Y	13	Who's Gonna Love Me Now?	Directors: Barak Heymann, Tomer Heymann	Peccadillo Pictures	Documentary	
F E B R U A R Y	14	A Quiet Passion	Director: Terence Davies; Cast: Cynthia Nixon, Jennifer Ehle, Keith Carradine	Soda Pictures; Based on the life of Emily Dickinson	Drama; Biopic	
F E B R U A R Y	15	Alone in Berlin	Director: Vincent Pérez; Cast: Emma Thompson, Brendan Gleeson, Daniel Brühl	Altitude Film Distribution; Based on Every Man Dies Alone by Hans Fallada and the lives of Otto and Elise Hampel (Co-produced by France and Germany)	War drama	
F E B R U A R Y	16	Genius	Director: Michael Grandage; Cast: Colin Firth, Jude Law, Nicole Kidman, Laura Linney, Guy Pearce, Dominic West	Summit Entertainment; Roadside Attractions; Based on Max Perkins: Editor of Genius by A. Scott Berg (Co-produced by United States)	Biographical drama	
F E B R U A R Y	24	Grimsby	Director: Louis Leterrier; Cast: Sacha Baron Cohen, Mark Strong, Rebel Wilson, Penélope Cruz, Isla Fisher, Gabourey Sidibe	Columbia Pictures (Co-produced by United States)	Action comedy	
M A R C H	4	The Other Side of the Door	Director: Johannes Roberts; Cast: Sarah Wayne Callies Jeremy Sisto	20th Century Fox (Co-produced by India and United States)	Supernatural-horror	
M A R C H	5	My Feral Heart	Director: Jane Gull; Cast: Steven Brandon, Shana Swash, Will Rastall, Pixie Le Knot, Eileen Pollock, Suzanna Hamilton	British Film Institute	Indie	
M A R C H	16	The Pass	Director: Ben A. Williams; Cast: Russell Tovey, Arinze Kene	Lionsgate; Based on The Pass by John Donnelly	Drama	

=== April – June ===
Opening		Title	Cast and crew	Details	Genre(s)	Ref.
A P R I L	5	The Call Up	Director: Charles Barker; Cast: Max Deacon, Morfydd Clark, Ali Cook	Altitude Film Distribution	Science fiction thriller	
A P R I L	5	Criminal	Director: Ariel Vromen; Cast: Kevin Costner, Gal Gadot, Tommy Lee Jones, Gary Oldman, Alice Eve, Ryan Reynolds	Summit Entertainment (Co-produced by United States)	Action; Crime-thriller	
A P R I L	8	Smoking Guns	Director: Savvas D. Michael; Cast: Dexter Fletcher, Daniel Caltagirone, Count Prince Miller, Ewen MacIntosh	SP Distribution	Action; Crime-thriller	
A P R I L	15	Despite the Falling Snow	Director: Shamim Sarif; Cast: Rebecca Ferguson, Sam Reid, Charles Dance	Altitude Film Distribution; Based on Despite the Falling Snow by Shamim Sarif (Co-produced by Canada)	Spy	
A P R I L	16	Detour	Director: Christopher Smith; Cast: Tye Sheridan, Stephen Moyer, Emory Cohen, Bel Powley	Magnet Releasing (Co-produced by South Africa)	Thriller	
A P R I L	17	Adult Life Skills	Director: Rachel Tunnard; Cast: Jodie Whittaker, Edward Hogg, Brett Goldstein, Alice Lowe	Lorton Distribution; Based on the short film Emotional Fusebox by Rachel Tunnard	Comedy	
A P R I L	22	Special Correspondents	Director: Ricky Gervais; Cast: Rickey Gervais, Eric Bana	Netflix; Remake of Envoyés très spéciaux (Co-produced by Canada and United States)	Satirical comedy	
A P R I L	23	Florence Foster Jenkins	Director: Stephen Frears; Cast: Meryl Streep, Hugh Grant	20th Century Fox; Based on the life of Florence Foster Jenkins (Co-produced by France)	Biographical comedy	
A P R I L	29	Golden Years	Director: John Miller; Cast: Bernard Hill, Virginia McKenna, Sue Johnstone, Phil Davis	MoliFilms Entertainment	Crime; Comedy drama	
M A Y	1	Hot Property	Director: Max McGill; Cast: MyAnna Buring, Tom Rhys Harries, Ella Smith, Sam Phillips, Kate Bracken	101 Films Limited	Comedy	
M A Y	1	Our Kind of Traitor	Director: Susanna White; Cast: Ewan McGregor, Stellan Skarsgård, Damian Lewis, Naomie Harris	Lionsgate; Based on Our Kind of Traitor by John le Carré	Spy thriller	
M A Y	3	Bobby Sands: 66 Days	Director: Brendan J. Byrne; Starring: Martin McCann, Fintan O'Toole, Charles Moore, Richard English, Norman Tebbit, Tim Pat Coogan, Dessie Waterworth, Gerry Adams	Wildcard Distribution; Based on Bobby Sands and the 1981 Irish hunger strike	Documentary	
M A Y	13	I, Daniel Blake	Director: Ken Loach; Cast: Dave Johns, Hayley Squires	eOne Films	Drama	
M A Y	13	Kill Command	Director: Steven Gomez; Cast: Thure Lindhardt, Vanessa Kirby	Vertigo Films Front Row Filmed Entertainment; Parco Co. Ltd.	Science fiction horror	
M A Y	15	American Honey	Director: Andrea Arnold; Cast: Sasha Lane, Shia LaBeouf, Riley Keough	Focus Features (Co-produced by United States)	Drama	
M A Y	15	Prevenge	Director: Alice Lowe; Cast: Alice Lowe	Kaliedoscope	Comedy slasher	
M A Y	16	Loving	Director: Jeff Nichols; Cast: Joel Edgerton, Ruth Negga, Marton Csokas, Nick Kroll, Michael Shannon	Focus Features; Based on the 1967 U.S. Supreme Court decision Loving v. Virginia (Co-produced by United States)	Historical drama	
M A Y	23	Me Before You	Director: Thea Sharrock; Cast: Emilia Clarke, Sam Claflin, Jenna Coleman, Charles Dance, Janet McTeer, Matthew Lewis, Brendan Coyle, Vanessa Kirby, Ben Lloyd-Hughes	Warner Bros. Pictures; Based on Me Before You by Jojo Moyes (Co-produced by United States)	Romantic drama	
J U N E	8	100 Streets	Director: Jim O'Hanlon; Cast: Idris Elba, Gemma Arterton	Vertigo Releasing	Drama	
J U N E	11	A Cambodian Spring	Director: Christopher Kelly	Dartmouth Films	Documentary	
J U N E	14	India in a Day	Director: Richie Mehta		Documentary	
J U N E	15	Tommy's Honour	Director: Jason Connery; Cast: Peter Mullan, Jack Lowden, Ophelia Lovibond, Sam Neill	Timeless Films; Based on Tommy's Honor: The Story of Old Tom Morris and Young Tom Morris, Golf's Founding Father and Son by Kevin Cook (Co-produced by United States)	Historical drama	
J U N E	18	The White King	Director: Alex Helfrecht and Jörg Tittel; Cast: Lorenzo Allchurch, Olivia Williams, Ólafur Darri Ólafsson, Jonathan Pryce	Signature Entertainment; Based on The White King by György Dragomán (Co-produced by Hungary)	Science fiction drama	
J U N E	22	Away	Director: David Blair; Cast: Juno Temple, Timothy Spall	Metrodome Distribution	Drama	
J U N E	22	Kids in Love	Director: Chris Foggin; Cast: Will Poulter, Alma Jodorowsky, Jamie Blackley, Cara Delevingne	Signature Entertainment	Coming-of-age drama	
J U N E	26	Whisky Galore!	Director: Gillies MacKinnon; Cast: Gregor Fisher, Eddie Izzard, Sean Biggerstaff, Naomi Battrick, James Cosmo, Ellie Kendrick, Kevin Guthrie	GEM Entertainment	Comedy	
J U N E	27	The Legend of Tarzan	Director: David Yates; Cast: Alexander Skarsgård, Samuel L. Jackson, Margot Robbie, Djimon Hounsou, Jim Broadbent, Christoph Waltz	Based on Tarzan stories by Edgar Rice Burroughs; Warner Bros. (Co-produced by Australia and the United States)	Adventure	

=== July – September ===
Opening		Title	Cast and crew	Details	Genre(s)	Ref.
J U L Y	1	Absolutely Fabulous: The Movie	Director: Mandie Fletcher; Cast: Jennifer Saunders, Joanna Lumley	Fox Searchlight Pictures; Based on the Absolutely Fabulous television series	Female buddy film Comedy	
J U L Y	1	Anthropoid	Director: Sean Ellis; Cast: Cillian Murphy, Jamie Dornan	Bleecker Street; Based on the 1942 Operation Anthropoid (Co-produced by Czech Republic and France)	Historical drama War	
J U L Y	1	The Darkest Universe	Directors: Will Sharpe, Tom Kingsley; Cast: Will Sharpe, Tiani Ghosh, Joe Thomas, Sophia Di Martino, Raph Shirley, Chris Langham		Drama; Mystery	
J U L Y	8	A Dark Song	Director: Liam Gavin; Cast: Steve Oram, Catherine Walker, Mark Huberman, Susan Loughnane	Kaleidoscope Film Distribution (Co-produced by Ireland)	Horror	
J U L Y	8	The Lighthouse	Director: Chris Crow; Cast: Mark Lewis Jones, Michael Jibson, Ian Virgo	Soda Pictures; Based on the Smalls Lighthouse incident	Psychological thriller Drama	
J U L Y	27	The Killing$ of Tony Blair	Directors: Sanne van den Bergh, Greg Ward; Starring: George Galloway	Journeyman Pictures	Documentary	
A U G U S T	19	David Brent: Life on the Road	Director: Ricky Gervais; Cast: Ricky Gervais, Ben Bailey Smith	Entertainment One	Mockumentary comedy	
A U G U S T	19	Kubo and the Two Strings	Director: Travis Knight; Cast: Charlize Theron, Art Parkinson, Ralph Fiennes, Rooney Mara, George Takei, Matthew McConaughey	Focus Features (North America), Universal Pictures (International)	stop-motion animated action fantasy	
A U G U S T	19	Swallows and Amazons	Director: Philippa Lowthorpe; Cast: Rafe Spall, Andrew Scott, Kelly Macdonald	StudioCanal; Based on Swallows and Amazons by Arthur Ransome	Family adventure	
A U G U S T	26	The Chamber	Director: Ben Parker; Cast: Johannes Bah Kuhnke, Charlotte Salt, James McArdle, Elliot Levey	StudioCanal UK (Co-produced by United States)	Survival	
A U G U S T	29	Brotherhood	Director: Noel Clarke; Cast: Noel Clarke, Stormzy, Bashy	Lionsgate; Sequel to Adulthood and final instalment of the Hood trilogy	Drama	
S E P T E M B E R	1	The Light Between Oceans	Director: Derek Cianfrance; Cast: Michael Fassbender, Alicia Vikander, Rachel Weisz	Entertainment One Films; Based on The Light Between Oceans by M. L. Stedman (Co-produced by Australia, New Zealand and United States)	Romantic period drama	
S E P T E M B E R	2	The 9th Life of Louis Drax	Director: Alexandre Aja; Cast: Jamie Dornan, Sarah Gadon, Aaron Paul	Soda Pictures (Co-produced by Canada and United States)	Supernatural thriller	
S E P T E M B E R	2	Morgan	Director: Luke Scott; Cast: Kate Mara, Anya Taylor-Joy, Toby Jones	20th Century Fox (Co-produced by United States)	Science fiction horror	
S E P T E M B E R	2	One More Time with Feeling	Director: Andrew Dominik; Starring: Nick Cave, Warren Ellis, Susie Bick	Picturehouse; Based on Nick Cave and the Bad Seeds and Skeleton Tree	Documentary	
S E P T E M B E R	2	Una	Director: Benedict Andrews; Cast: Rooney Mara, Ben Mendelsohn, Riz Ahmed	Thunderbird Releasing; Based on Blackbird by David Harrower (Co-produced by Canada and United States)	Drama	
S E P T E M B E R	5	Bridget Jones's Baby	Director: Sharon Maguire; Cast: Renée Zellweger, Colin Firth, Patrick Dempsey, Emma Thompson	Universal Pictures; Sequel to Bridget Jones: The Edge of Reason (Co-produced by France and United States)	Comedy	
S E P T E M B E R	7	The Journey	Director: Nick Hamm; Cast: Timothy Spall, Colm Meaney	IFC Films (Co-produced by Ireland)	Drama	
S E P T E M B E R	8	Free Fire	Director: Ben Wheatley; Cast: Brie Larson, Sharlto Copley, Armie Hammer, Cillian Murphy, Jack Reynor, Babou Ceesay, Enzo Cilenti, Sam Riley	StudioCanal UK	Action comedy	
S E P T E M B E R	8	Message from the King	Director: Fabrice Du Welz; Cast: Chadwick Boseman, Luke Evans, Teresa Palmer, Alfred Molina	Netflix (Co-produced by Belgium, France and United States)	Action-thriller	
S E P T E M B E R	9	The Autopsy of Jane Doe	Director: André Øvredal; Cast: Emile Hirsch, Brian Cox, Olwen Catherine Kelly	IFC Midnight (Co-produced by United States)	Horror	
S E P T E M B E R	9	The Girl with All the Gifts	Director: Colm McCarthy; Cast: Sennia Nanua, Gemma Arterton, Glenn Close, Paddy Considine	Warner Bros. Pictures; Based on The Girl with All the Gifts by M.R. Carey	Post-apocalyptic zombie horror	
S E P T E M B E R	9	On the Milky Road	Director: Emir Kusturica; Cast: Emir Kusturica, Monica Bellucci, Sloboda Mićalović, Predrag Manojlović	Based on Words with Gods (Co-produced by Republika Srpska, Serbia, Mexico and United States)	Drama	
S E P T E M B E R	9	Trespass Against Us	Director: Adam Smith; Cast: Michael Fassbender, Brendan Gleeson	Lionsgate (Co-produced by United States)	Crime drama	
S E P T E M B E R	9	A United Kingdom	Director: Amma Asante; Cast: David Oyelowo, Rosamund Pike, Terry Pheto, Jack Davenport, Tom Felton	20th Century Fox; Based on Colour Bar by Susan Williams (Co-produced by France)	Drama; Biopic	
S E P T E M B E R	10	A Monster Calls	Director: J. A. Bayona; Cast: Lewis MacDougall, Sigourney Weaver, Felicity Jones, Liam Neeson	Summit Entertainment; Based on A Monster Calls by Patrick Ness (Co-produced by Spain and United States)	Dark fantasy drama	
S E P T E M B E R	10	Lady Macbeth	Director: William Oldroyd; Cast: Florence Pugh, Cosmo Jarvis, Paul Hilton, Naomi Ackie, Christopher Fairbank	Altitude Film Distribution; Based on Lady Macbeth of the Mtsensk District by Nikolai Leskov	Drama	
S E P T E M B E R	10	The Levelling	Director: Hope Dickson Leach; Cast: Ellie Kendrick, David Troughton, Jack Holden, Joe Blakemore	Peccadillo Pictures	Drama	
S E P T E M B E R	10	The Limehouse Golem	Director: Juan Carlos Medina; Cast: Bill Nighy, Olivia Cooke, Douglas Booth	Lionsgate; Based on Dan Leno and the Limehouse Golem by Peter Ackroyd	Horror-mystery	
S E P T E M B E R	10	Lion	Director: Garth Davis; Cast: Dev Patel, Sunny Pawar, Nicole Kidman, Rooney Mara	Entertainment Film Distributors; Based on A Long Way Home by Saroo Brierley (Co-produced by Australia and United States)	Biopigraphical drama	
S E P T E M B E R	10	Their Finest	Director: Lone Scherfig; Cast: Gemma Arterton, Bill Nighy, Sam Claflin	Lionsgate; Based on Their Finest Hour and a Half by Lissa Evans	War comedy-drama	
S E P T E M B E R	11	Denial	Director: Mick Jackson; Cast: Rachel Weisz, Tom Wilkinson, Andrew Scott, Timothy Spall	Bleecker Street; Based on History on Trial: My Day in Court with a Holocaust Denier by Deborah Lipstadt (Co-produced by United States)	Historical drama	
S E P T E M B E R	12	City of Tiny Lights	Director: Pete Travis; Cast: Riz Ahmed, James Floyd, Billie Piper, Cush Jumbo, Roshan Seth, Antonio Aakeel	Icon Film Distribution; Based on City of Tiny Lights by Patrick Neate	Crime thriller	
S E P T E M B E R	12	The Exception	Director: David Leveaux; Cast: Lily James, Jai Courtney, Janet McTeer, Christopher Plummer	Signature Entertainment; Based on The Kaiser's Last Kiss by Alan Judd (Co-produced by United States)	Romantic war drama	
S E P T E M B E R	12	Paris Can Wait	Director: Eleanor Coppola; Cast: Diane Lane, Arnaud Viard, Alec Baldwin, Élise Tielrooy	GEM Entertainment (Co-produced by United States)	Comedy	
S E P T E M B E R	15	The Beatles: Eight Days a Week	Director: Ron Howard; Starring: The Beatles (archive), Paul McCartney, Ringo Starr	StudioCanal; PolyGram Entertainment; Based on the life of The Beatles (Co-produced by United States)	Documentary	
S E P T E M B E R	22	Don't Knock Twice	Director: Caradog W. James; Cast: Katee Sackhoff, Lucy Boynton, Javier Botet, Nick Moran	Signature Entertainment	Supernatural-horror	
S E P T E M B E R	25	Miss Peregrine's Home for Peculiar Children	Director: Tim Burton; Cast: Eva Green, Asa Butterfield, Chris O'Dowd	20th Century Fox; Based on Miss Peregrine's Home for Peculiar Children by Ransom Riggs (Co-produced by United States)	Fantasy film	
S E P T E M B E R	26	Chubby Funny	Director: Harry Michell; Cast: Harry Michell, Augustus Prew, Isabella Laughland, Asim Chaudhry, Alice Lowe, Olivia Ross, Julian Rhind-Tutt, Anna Maxwell Martin		Comedy drama	

=== October – December ===
Opening		Title	Cast and crew	Details	Genre(s)	Ref.
O C T O B E R	9	Mindhorn	Director: Sean Foley; Cast: Julian Barratt, Essie Davis, Kenneth Branagh, Andrea Riseborough	StudioCanal	Comedy	
O C T O B E R	14	Billy Lynn's Long Halftime Walk	Director: Ang Lee; Cast: Joe Alwyn, Kristen Stewart, Chris Tucker, Garrett Hedlund, Makenzie Leigh, Vin Diesel, Steve Martin	TriStar Pictures; Based on Billy Lynn's Long Halftime Walk by Ben Fountain (Co-produced by Taiwan and United States)	War drama	
O C T O B E R	14	The Ghoul	Director: Gareth Tunley; Cast: Tom Meeten, Alice Lowe, [[Rufus Jones (actor])|Rufus Jones]], Niamh Cusack, Geoffrey McGivern	Arrow Films	Thriller	
O C T O B E R	16	HyperNormalisation	Director: Adam Curtis	BBC	Documentary	
O C T O B E R	21	Kaleidoscope	Director: Rupert Jones; Cast: Toby Jones, Anne Reid, Sinead Matthews, Deborah Findlay	Sparky Pictures	Thriller	
O C T O B E R	26	Oasis: Supersonic	Director: Mat Whitecross; Starring: Oasis	Entertainment One; Lorton Distribution; Based on the life of Oasis	Documentary	
O C T O B E R	28	The Comedian's Guide to Survival	Director: James Mullinger; Cast: James Buckley, Myanna Buring, Paul Kaye, Neil Stuke, Vas Blackwood	GSP Studios International; Signature Entertainment (Co-produced by Canada)	Comedy	
O C T O B E R	28	Ethel & Ernest	Director: Roger Mainwood; Cast: Jim Broadbent, Brenda Blethyn	Universal Pictures; Vertigo Films; Based on Ethel & Ernest by Raymond Briggs	Animated biography	
O C T O B E R	28	Starfish	Director: Bill Clark; Cast: Tom Riley, Joanne Froggatt	Munro Film Services	Drama	
O C T O B E R	29	This Beautiful Fantastic	Director: Simon Aboud; Cast: Jessica Brown Findlay, Tom Wilkinson, Andrew Scott, Jeremy Irvine		Romantic drama	
N O V E M B E R	3	A Street Cat Named Bob	Director: Roger Spottiswoode; Cast: Luke Treadaway, Ruta Gedmintas, Joanne Froggatt	Sony Pictures Releasing; Based on A Street Cat Named Bob and The World According to Bob by James Bowen	Biographical drama	
N O V E M B E R	9	Allied	Director: Robert Zemeckis; Cast: Brad Pitt, Marion Cotillard	Paramount Pictures (Co-produced by United States)	Romantic thriller	
N O V E M B E R	10	Fantastic Beasts and Where to Find Them	Director: David Yates; Cast: Eddie Redmayne, Katherine Waterston, Dan Fogler, Alison Sudol, Ezra Miller	Warner Bros. Pictures; Prequel to the Harry Potter film series (Co-produced by United States)	Fantasy film	
N O V E M B E R	16	Stockholm, My Love	Director: Mark Cousins; Cast: Neneh Cherry	BFI Video, BFI Films (Co-produced by Sweden)	Drama musical	
N O V E M B E R	19	Compulsion	Director: Craig Goodwill; Cast: Analeigh Tipton, Jakob Cedergren, Marta Gastini	Kaleidoscope Home Entertainment (Co-produced by Canada and Italy)	Erotic thriller	
N O V E M B E R	20	The Receptionist	Director: Jenny Lu; Cast: Teresa Daley, Chen Shiang-chyi, Amanda Fan, Josh Whitehouse	Munro Films (Co-produced by Taiwan)	Drama	
N O V E M B E R	28	I Am Bolt	Directors: Benjamin Turner, Gabe Turner; Starring: Usain Bolt, Serena Williams, Asafa Powell, Pelé, Ziggy Marley	Picturehouse Entertainment; Based on the life of Usain Bolt	Documentary; Sports	
N O V E M B E R	29	Silence	Director: Martin Scorsese; Cast: Andrew Garfield, Adam Driver, Tadanobu Asano, Ciarán Hinds, Liam Neeson	StudioCanal UK; Based on Silence by Shūsaku Endō (Co-produced by Italy, Japan, Mexico, Taiwan and United States)	Historical period drama	
D E C E M B E R	13	Resident Evil: The Final Chapter	Directors: Paul W. S. Anderson; Cast: Milla Jovovich, Ali Larter, Shawn Roberts, Ruby Rose	Sony Pictures Releasing; Loosely based on the video game series Resident Evil; Sequel to Resident Evil: Retribution (Co-produced by Australia, Canada, France, Germany and United States)	Science fiction Action	

=== Other premieres ===
Title	Director	Release date	Ref.
Alleycats	Ian Bonhôte	23 June 2016 (East End Film Festival)	
Bad Caller	Al Carretta	1 August 2016 (Nightpiece Film Festival)	
Brakes	Mercedes Grower	17 June 2016 (Edinburgh International Film Festival)	
Broken	Shaun Robert Smith	28 August 2016 (Horror Channel FrightFest)	
The Carer	János Edelényi	3 January 2016 (Palm Springs International Film Festival)	
ChickLit	Tony Britten	2 September 2016	
Crow	Wyndham Price	28 August 2016 (Horror Channel FrightFest)	
Cruel Summer	Phillip Escott, Craig Newman	27 August 2016 (Horror Channel FrightFest)	
The Curious World of Hieronymus Bosch	David Bickerstaff	3 November 2016	
Dusty and Me	Betsan Morris Evans	12 November 2016 (Tallinn Black Nights Film Festival)	
Eglantine	Margaret Salmon	9 October 2016 (London Film Festival)	
FirstBorn	Nirpal Bhogal	19 June 2016 (Edinburgh International Film Festival)	
Fractured	Jamie Patterson	29 October 2016 (British Horror Film Festival)	
Gangster Kittens	Ash Mahmood, Naeem Mahmood	1 December 2016	
The Gatehouse	Martin Gooch	1 October 2016 (Raindance Film Festival)	
George Best: All by Himself	Daniel Gordon	14 October 2016 (London Film Festival)	
The Guv'nor	Paul Van Carter	2 July 2016 (East End Film Festival)	
The Habit of Beauty	Mirko Pincelli	8 May 2016 (Trento Film Festival)	
Hamish	Robbie Fraser	23 February 2016	
In the Last Days of the City	Tamer El Said	14 February 2016 (Berlin International Film Festival)	
The Islands and the Whales	Mike Day	29 April 2016 (Toronto Hot Docs Festival)	
Level Up	Adam Randall	26 August 2016	
The Library Suicides	Euros Lyn	17 June 2016 (Edinburgh International Film Festival)	
Love Is Thicker Than Water	Emily Harris and Ate de Jong	25 June 2016 (East End Film Festival)	
Mo Farah: No Easy Mile	Joe Pearlman, David Soutar	5 December 2016	
Moon Dogs	Philip John	17 June 2016 (Edinburgh International Film Festival)	
Mum's List	Niall Johnson	25 November 2016	
The New Man	Josh Appignanesi	18 November 2016	
On The Road	Michael Winterbottom	9 October 2016 (London Film Festival)	
Painting the Modern Garden: Monet to Matisse	David Bickerstaff	12 April 2016 (limited)	
Respectable - The Mary Millington Story	Simon Sheridan	7 April 2016	
The Seasons in Quincy: Four Portraits of John Berger	Bartek Dziadosz, Colin MacCabe	16 February 2016 (Berlin International Film Festival)	
Servants' Quarters	Paul Raschid	23 September 2016 (Raindance Film Festival)	
Small Town Hero	Darren Bolton	17 June 2016 (Lincoln)	
Stanley a Man of Variety	Stephen Cookson	7 October 2016	
Stoner Express (a.k.a. AmStarDam)	Lee Lennox, Wayne Lennox	19 August 2016 (DVD premiere), 26 September 2016 (Raindance Film Festival)	
Tracking Edith	Peter Stephan Jungk	31 October 2016 (Vienna)	
Versus: The Life and Films of Ken Loach	Louise Osmond	3 June 2016	
Waterboys	Robert Jan Westdijk	2 October 2016 (PAC Festival)	
White Island	Benjamin Turner	23 June 2016 (Edinburgh International Film Festival)	
White Colour Black	Joseph A. Adesunloye	15 October 2016	
You've Been Trumped Too	Anthony Baxter	28 October 2016	

=== Culturally British Films ===
The following list comprises films not produced by Great Britain or the United Kingdom but is strongly associated with British culture. The films in this list should fulfill at least 3 of the following criteria:

- The film is adapted from a British source material.
- The story is set, at least partially, in the United Kingdom.
- The film was shot, at least partially, in the United Kingdom.
- Many of the film's cast and crew members are British.

Title	Country of origin	Adaptation	Film Setting	Film Locations	British Cast and Crew
Alice Through the Looking Glass	United States	Through the Looking-Glass by Lewis Carroll	London, England	Gloucester Docks, Shepperton Studios and Longcross Studios, United Kingdom	James Bobin (director), Matt Lucas, Rhys Ifans, Helena Bonham Carter, Sacha Baron Cohen, Alan Rickman, Stuart Dryburgh (cinematographer)
The BFG	United States	The BFG by Roald Dahl	London, England	Bamburgh Castle, Blenheim Palace, Skye in Scotland and London, United Kingdom	Ruby Barnhill, Mark Rylance, Penelope Wilton, Rebecca Hall, Rafe Spall, Joanna Johnston (costume designer)
The Conjuring 2	United States	Inspired by the Enfield Poltergeist	London, England	The Warrington and Marylebone station in London, United Kingdom	Frances O'Connor, Benjamin Haigh, Simon McBurney, Robin Atkin Downes
Doctor Strange	United States		London, England	Buckinghamshire, Kent, London and Surrey, United Kingdom	Benedict Cumberbatch, Chiwetel Ejiofor, Benedict Wong, Scott Adkins, Tilda Swinton, Ben Davis (cinematographer)
Jason Bourne	United States; China		London, England	Hertfordshire and London, United Kingdom	Riz Ahmed, Paul Greengrass (director), John Powell (film composer), David Buckley (film composers), Barry Ackroyd (cinematographer)
London Has Fallen	United States		London, England	Somerset House, United Kingdom	Gerard Butler, Charlotte Riley, Colin Salmon, Patrick Kennedy, Bryan Larkin, Michael Wildman, Andrew Pleavin, The Chamber Orchestra of London, Ed Wild (cinematographer), Michael J. Duthie (editor)
The Lost City of Z	United States	The life of Percy Fawcett	London, England	Greyabbey Village, Strangford Lough, Craigavon House, Methodist College Belfast, Belfast City Hall, Royal Belfast Academical Institution and Bangor Castle, Northern Ireland, United Kingdom	Charlie Hunnam, Robert Pattinson, Sienna Miller, Tom Holland, Angus Macfadyen
Love & Friendship	France; Ireland; Netherlands	Lady Susan by Jane Austen	England		Kate Beckinsale, Stephen Fry, Emma Greenwell, Morfydd Clark, James Fleet, Jemma Redgrave, Tom Bennett

== British award winners ==
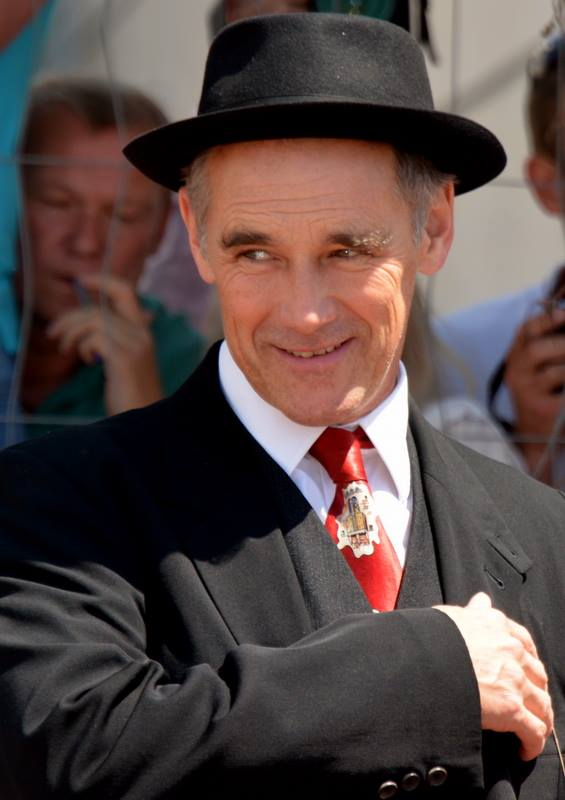
Mark Rylance received multiple best supporting actor awards for his performance in Bridge of Spies.

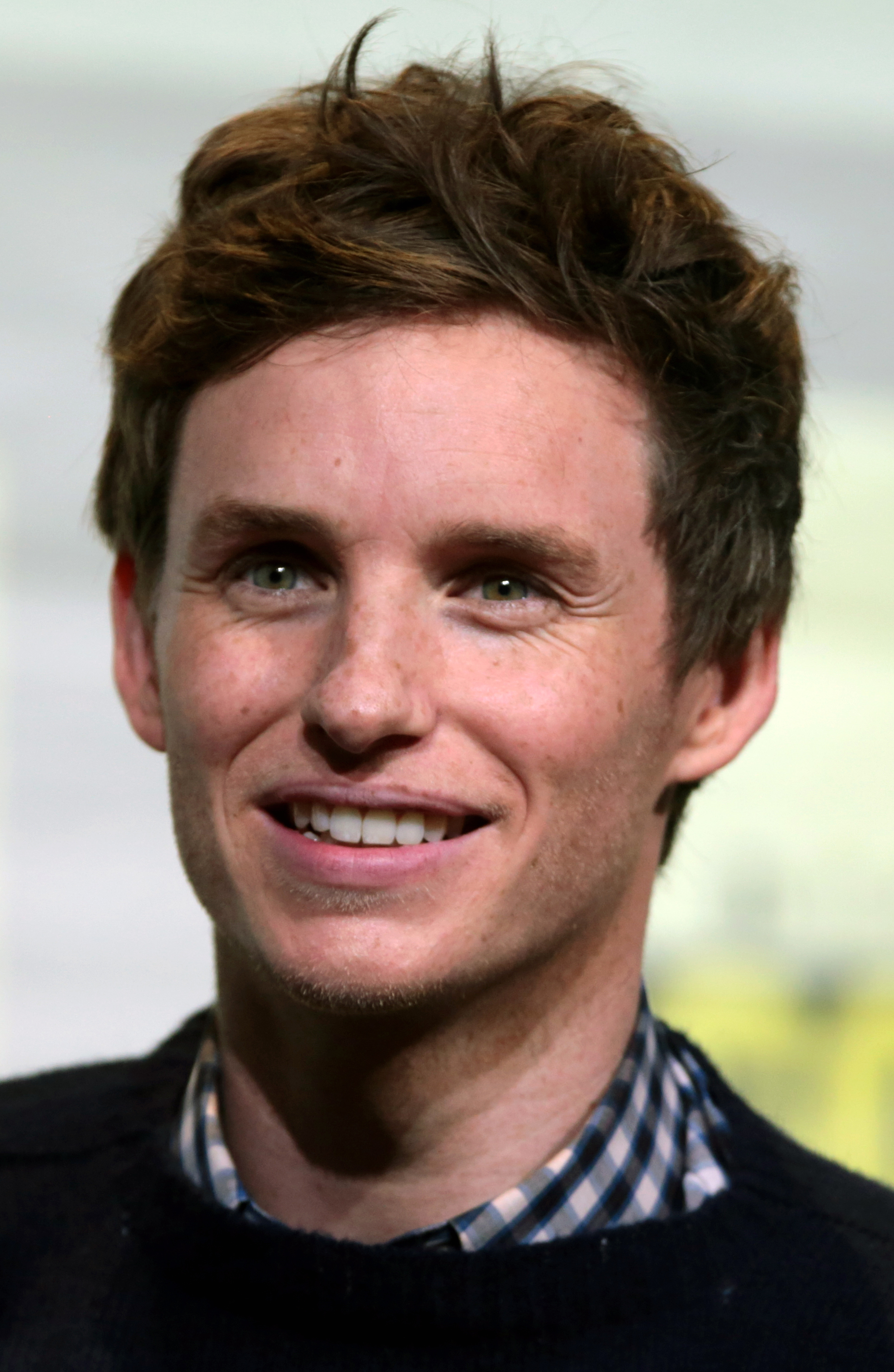
Eddie Redmayne received multiple best actor nominations for his performance in The Danish Girl. He won the same award in four of the five award ceremonies the previous year with The Theory of Everything.

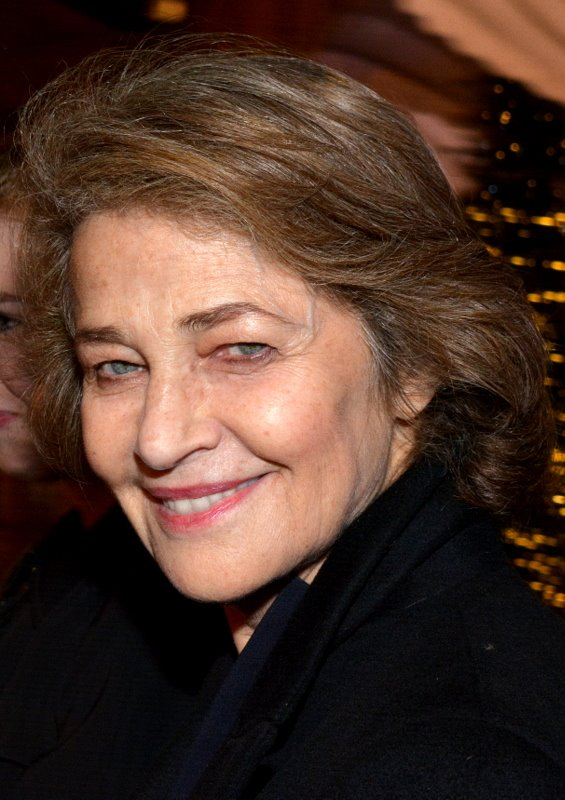
Charlotte Rampling received multiple best actress nominations for her performance in 45 Years.

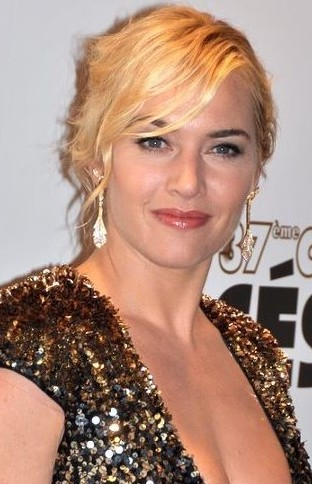
Kate Winslet received multiple awards and nominations for her supporting role in Steve Jobs.

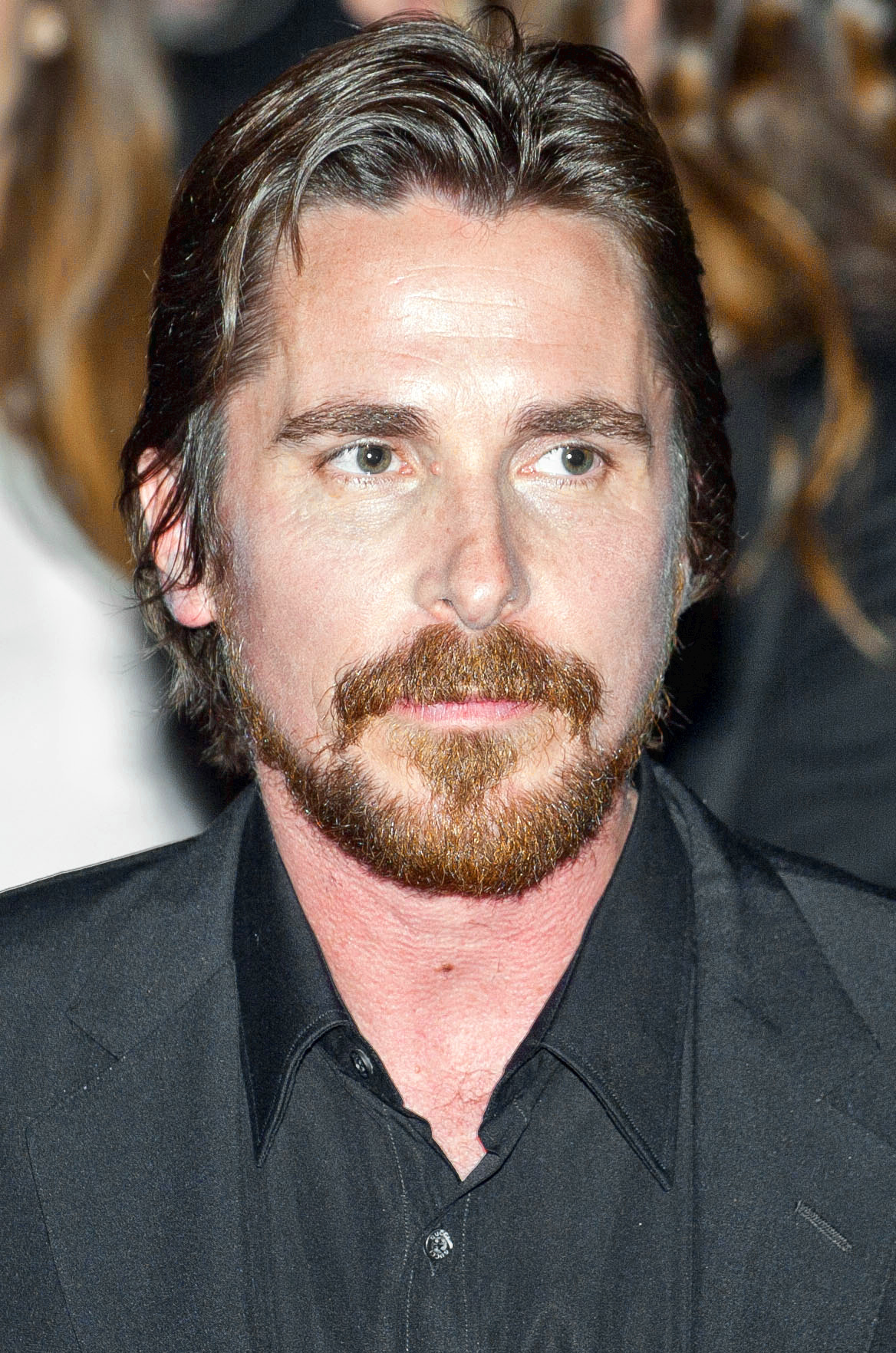
Christian Bale received multiple nominations for his supporting role in The Big Short.

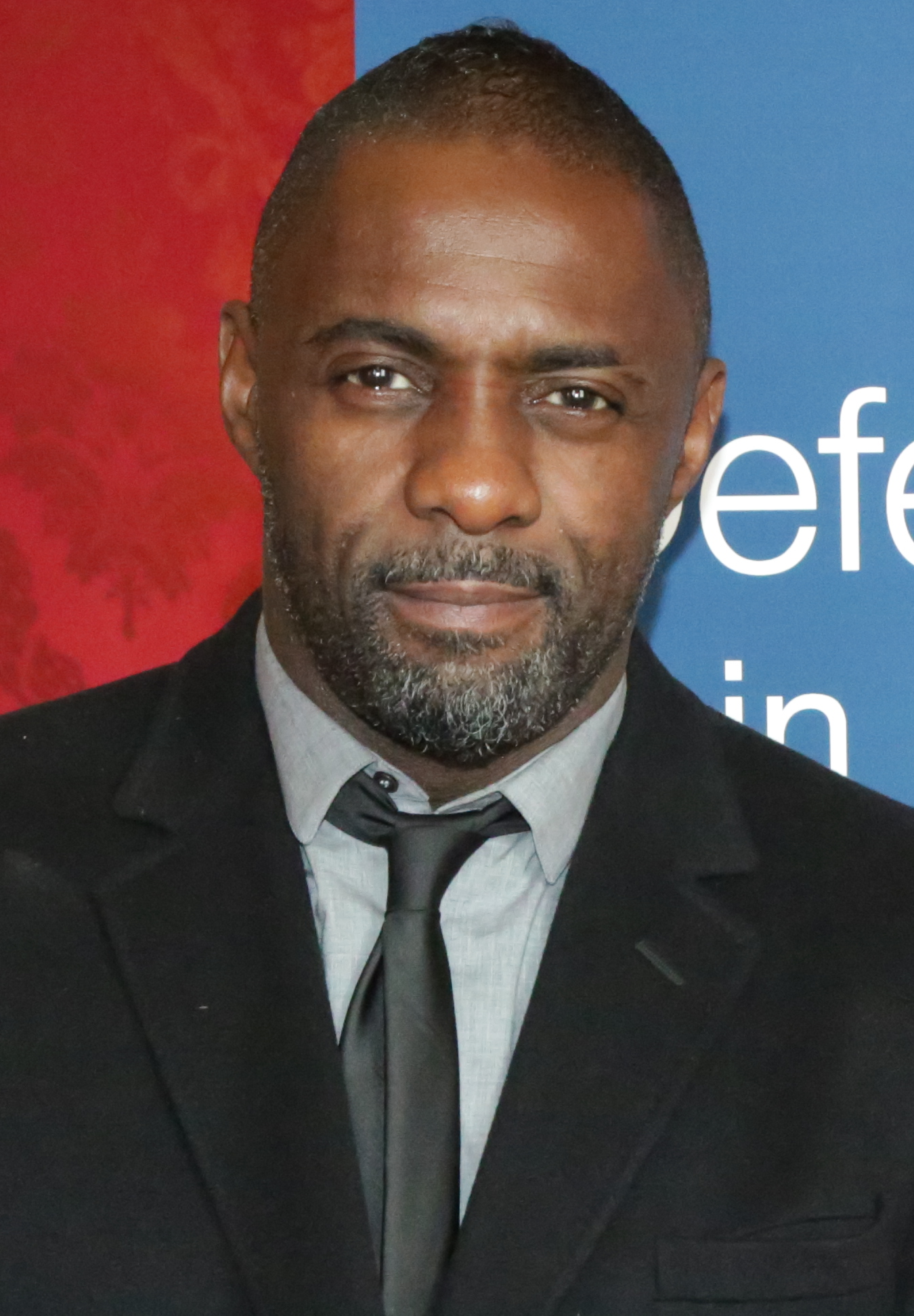
Idris Elba received multiple nominations for his supporting role in Beasts of No Nation.

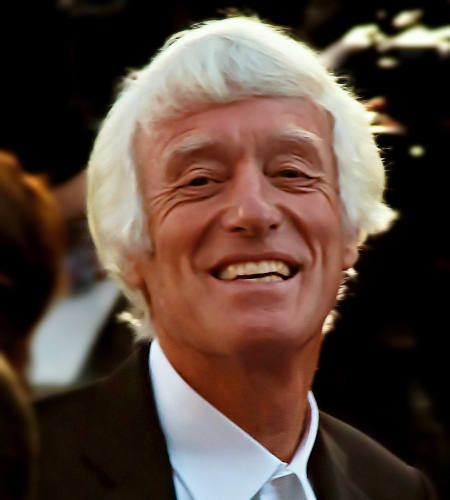
Roger Deakins, the acclaimed cinematographer, received multiple nominations for Sicario.

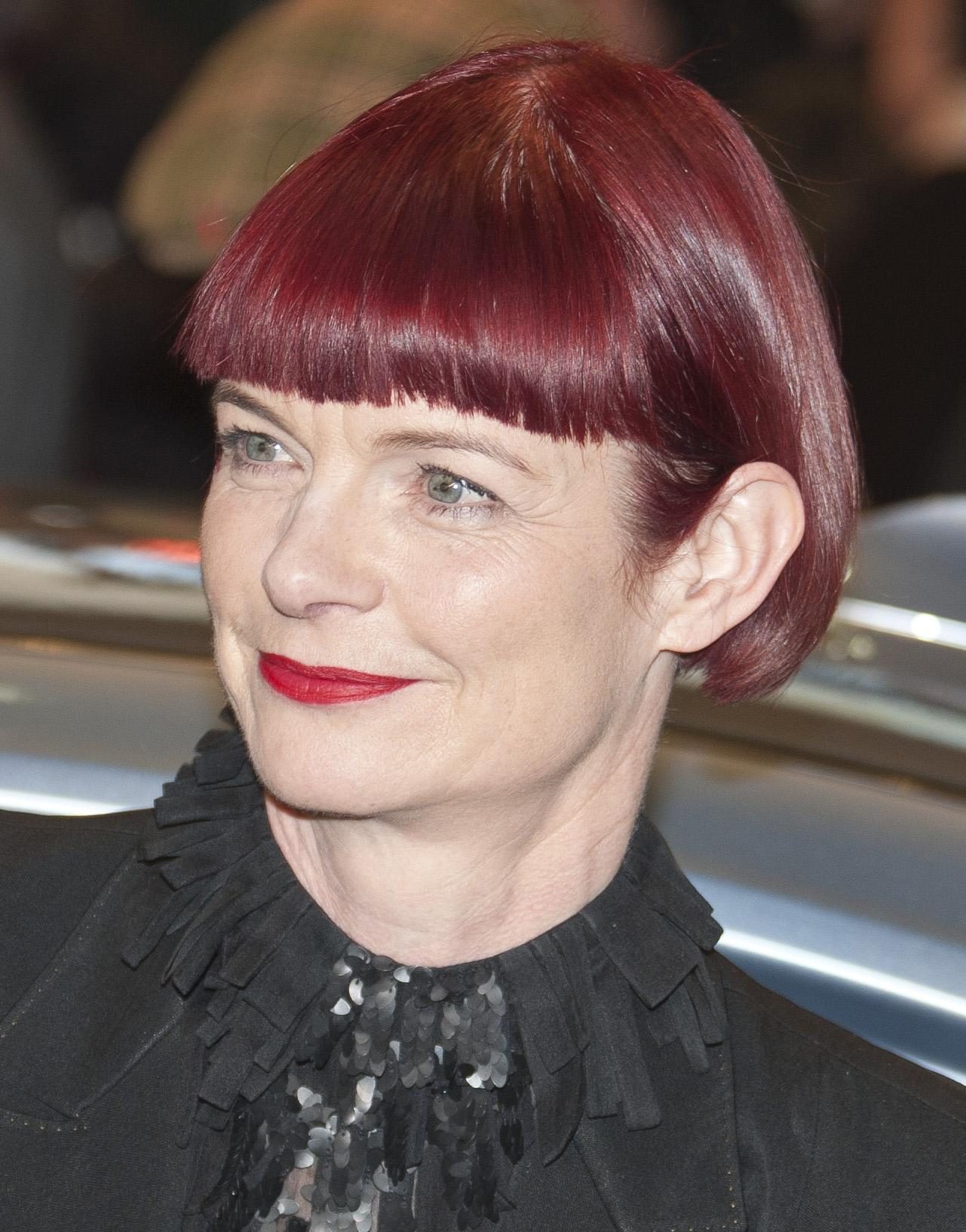
Sandy Powell received multiple nominations for costume design in both Carol and Cinderella.

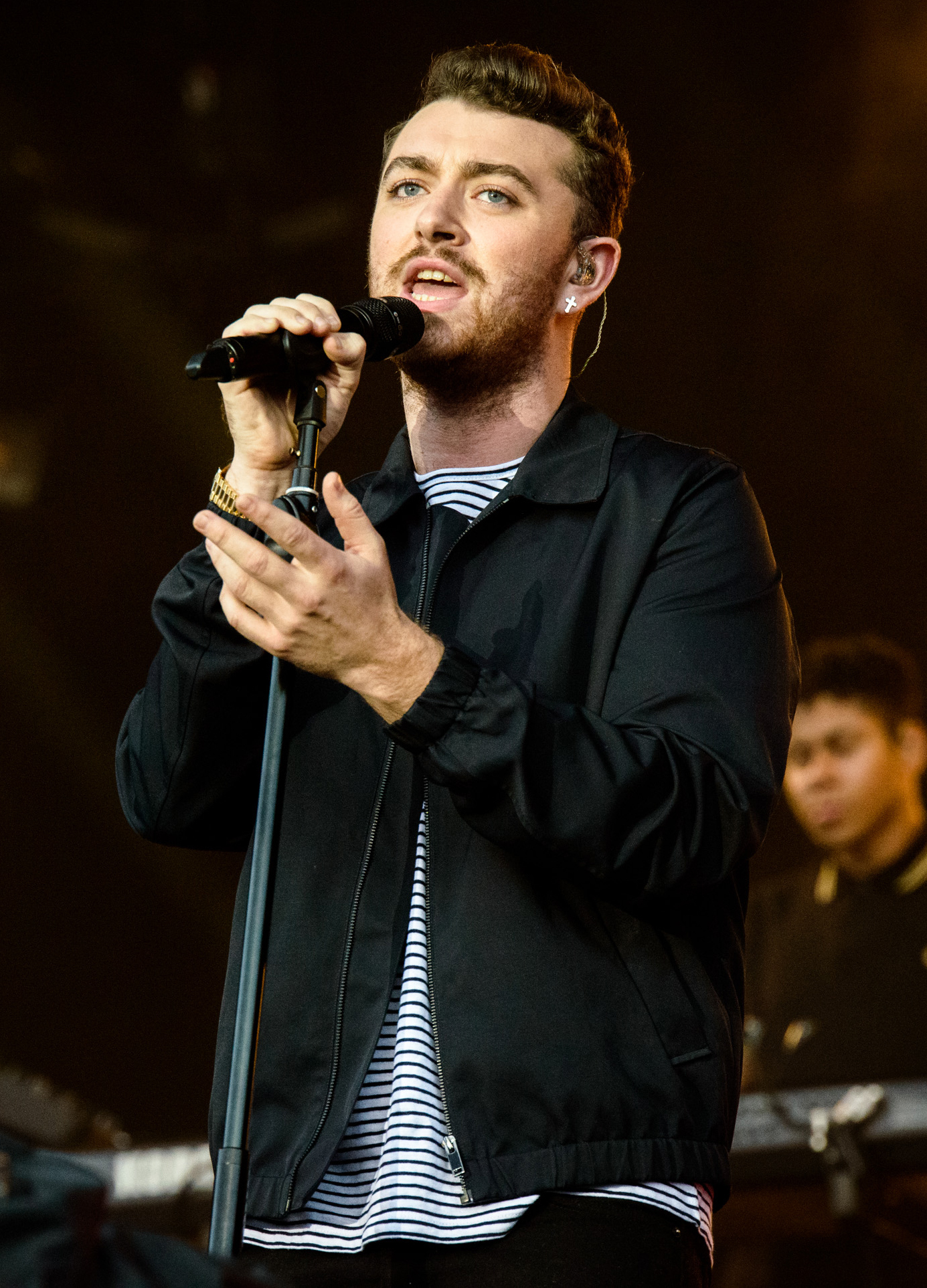
Sam Smith received multiple awards for Best Original Song with Writing's on the Wall written for Spectre in collaboration with Jimmy Napes.

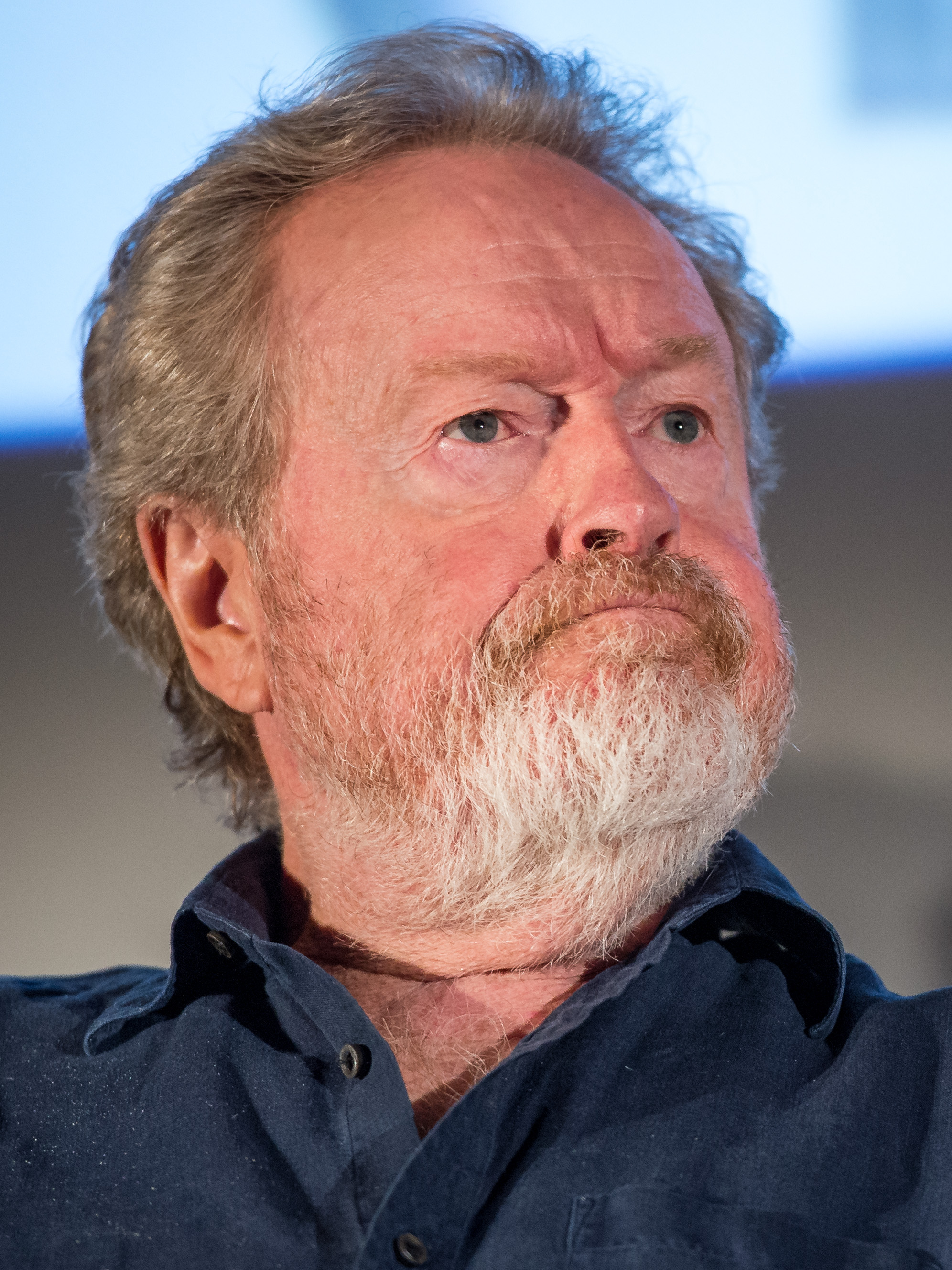
Ridley Scott received multiple nominations for directing The Martian.

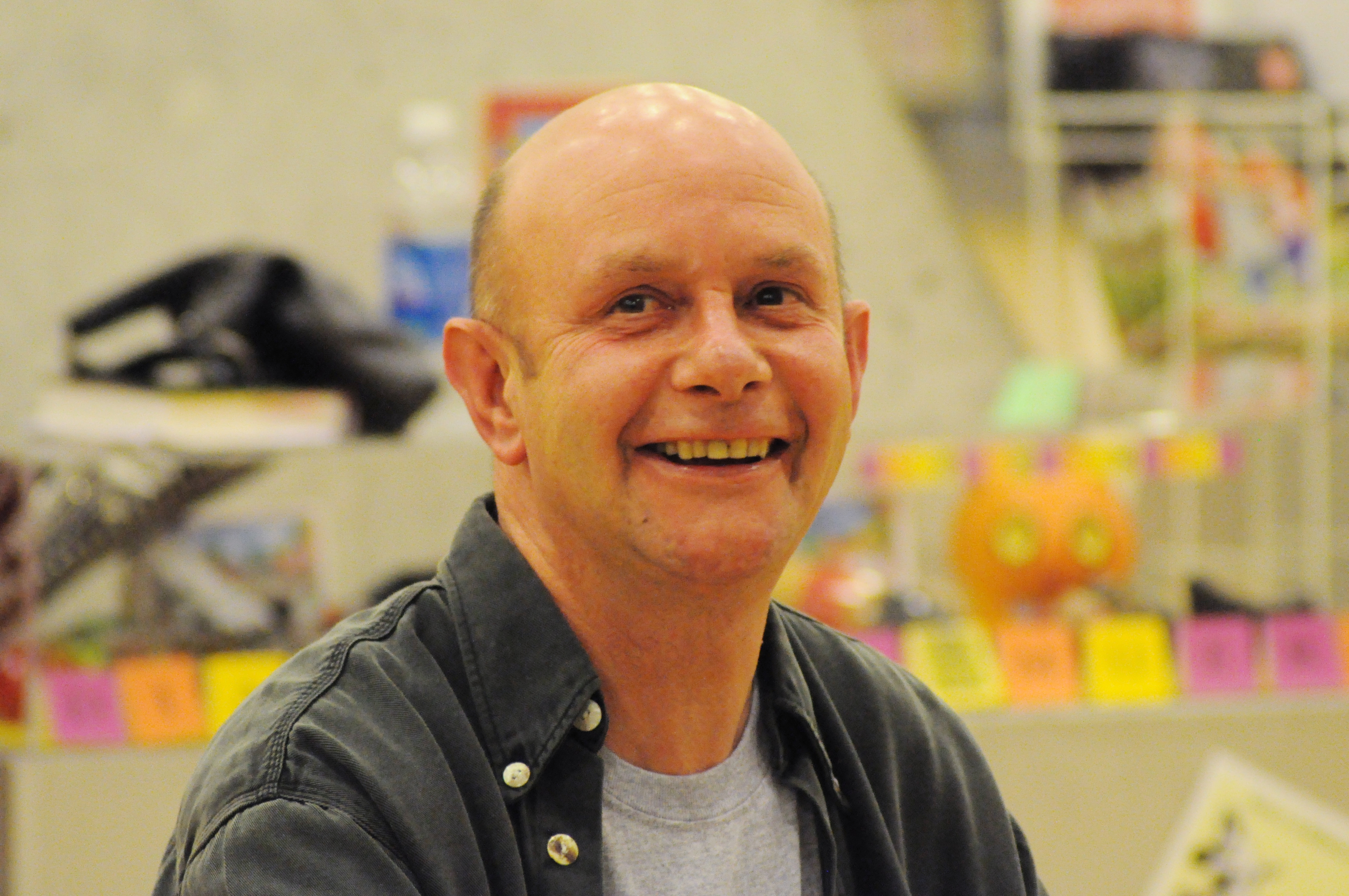
Nick Hornby received multiple nominations for adapting Colm Tóibín's Brooklyn to the 2015 film.

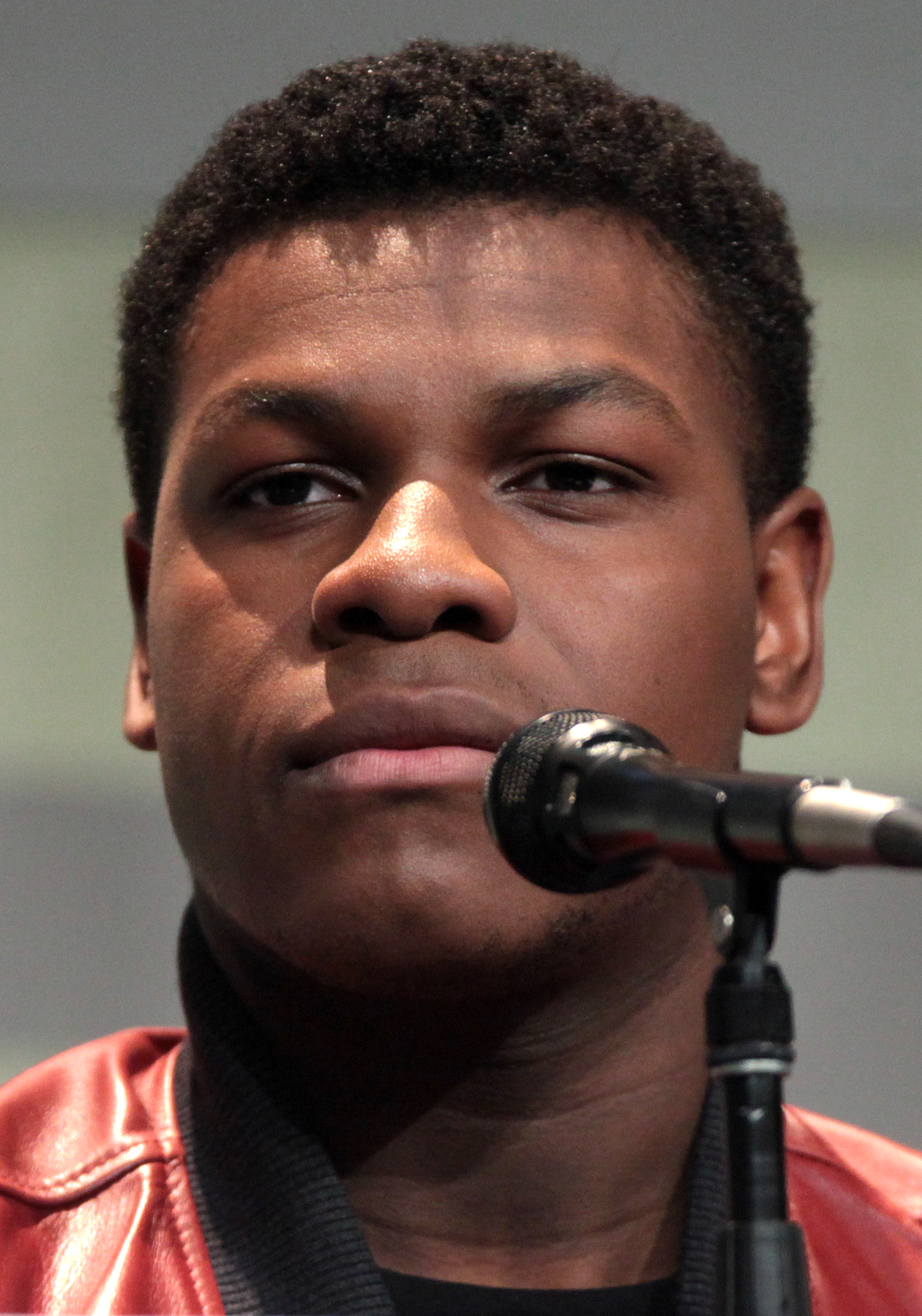
John Boyega won the EE Rising Star Award.

Listed here are the British winners and nominees at the five most prestigious film award ceremonies in the English-speaking world: the Academy Awards, British Academy Film Awards, Critics' Choice Awards, Golden Globe Awards and Screen Actors Guild Awards, that were held during 2016, celebrating the best films of 2015. The British nominations were led by Room, Brooklyn, Carol and The Martian, with Ex Machina and 'The Danish Girl going on to win a number of technical awards, whilst Mark Rylance and Kate Winslet won multiple best supporting actor and supporting actress awards for Bridge of Spies and Steve Jobs, respectively. British films did, however, notably lose out to Spotlight and The Revenant from the United States, and Mad Max: Fury Road from Australia.

=== Academy Awards ===
The 88th Academy Awards honoring the best films of 2015 were held on 28 February 2016.

British winners:

- Amy (Best Documentary – Feature)
- Ex Machina (Best Visual Effects)
- Room (Best Actress)
- Spectre (Best Original Song)
- Asif Kapadia (Best Documentary – Feature) – Amy
- James Gay-Rees (Best Documentary – Feature) – Amy
- Jenny Beavan (Best Costume Design) – Mad Max: Fury Road
- Jimmy Napes and Sam Smith (Best Original Song) – Writing's on the Wall from Spectre
- Mark Rylance (Best Supporting Actor) – Bridge of Spies
- Paul Norris (Best Visual Effects) – Ex Machina

British nominations:

- Brooklyn (Best Picture, Best Actress, Best Adapted Screenplay)
- The Danish Girl (Best Actor, Best Supporting Actress, Best Production Design, Best Costume Design)
- Fifty Shades of Grey (Best Original Song)
- The Martian (Best Picture, Best Actor, Best Adapted Screenplay, Best Sound Editing, Best Sound Mixing, Best Production Design, Best Visual Effects)
- Prologue (Best Animated Short Film)
- Room (Best Picture, Best Director, Best Adapted Screenplay)
- Shok (Best Live Action Short Film)
- Youth (Best Original Song)
- Adam Benzine (Best Documentary – Short Subject) – Claude Lanzmann: Spectres of the Shoah
- Alex Garland (Best Original Screenplay) – Ex Machina
- Andy Nelson (Best Sound Mixing) – Bridge of Spies and Star Wars: The Force Awakens
- Anohni (Best Original Song) – Racing Extinction
- Basil Khalil (Best Live Action Short Film) – Ave Maria
- Charlotte Rampling (Best Actress) – 45 Years
- Christian Bale (Best Supporting Actor) – The Big Short
- Eddie Redmayne (Best Actor) – The Danish Girl
- Eve Stewart (Best Production Design) – The Danish Girl
- Imogen Sutton (Best Animated Short Film) – Prologue
- Jamie Donoughue (Best Live Action Short Film) – Shok
- Joshua Oppenheimer (Best Documentary – Feature) – The Look of Silence
- Kate Winslet (Best Supporting Actress) – Steve Jobs
- Mark Burton (Best Animated Feature Film) – Shaun the Sheep Movie
- Mark Taylor (Best Sound Mixing) – The Martian
- Matt Charman (Best Original Screenplay) – Bridge of Spies
- Michael Standish (Best Production Design) – The Danish Girl
- Nick Hornby (Best Adapted Screenplay) – Brooklyn
- Oliver Tarney (Best Sound Editing) – The Martian
- Paul Massey (Best Sound Mixing) – The Martian
- Richard Williams (Best Animated Short Film) – Prologue
- Roger Deakins (Best Cinematography) – Sicario
- Sandy Powell (Best Costume Design) – Carol and Cinderella
- Stuart Wilson (Best Sound Mixing) – Star Wars: The Force Awakens
- Tom Hardy (Best Supporting Actor) – The Revenant
- Tom Wood (Best Visual Effects) – Mad Max: Fury Road

=== British Academy Film Awards ===
The 69th British Academy Film Awards honoring the best films of 2015 were held on 14 February 2016.

British winners:

- Amy (Best Documentary)
- Brooklyn (Outstanding British Film)
- Operator (Best Short Film)
- Room (Best Picture, Best Director, Best Adapted Screenplay)
- Theeb (Outstanding Debut by a British Writer, Director or Producer)
- Caroline Bartleet (Best Short Film) – Operator
- Chris Corbould (Best Special Visual Effects) – Star Wars: The Force Awakens
- Jenny Beavan (Best Costume Design) – Mad Max: Fury Road
- John Boyega (EE Rising Star Award)
- Kate Winslet (Best Actress in a Supporting Role) – Steve Jobs
- Mark Rylance (Best Actor in a Supporting Role) – Bridge of Spies
- Naji Abu Nowar and Rupert Lloyd (Outstanding Debut by a British Writer, Director or Producer) – Theeb
- Neal Scanlan (Best Special Visual Effects) – Star Wars: The Force Awakens
- Paul Kavanagh (Best Special Visual Effects) – Star Wars: The Force Awakens
- Roger Guyett (Best Special Visual Effects) – Star Wars: The Force Awakens
- Angels Costumes – Outstanding British Contribution to Cinema

British nominations:

- 45 Years (Outstanding British Film)
- A Syrian Love Story – (Outstanding Debut by a British Writer, Director or Producer)
- Brooklyn (Best Actress in a Leading Role, Best Actress in a Supporting Role, Best Adapted Screenplay, Outstanding British Film)
- Carol (Best Film, Best Actress in a Leading Role, Best Actress in a Supporting Role, Best Adapted Screenplay, Best Cinematography)
- The Danish Girl (Best Actor in a Leading Role, Best Actress in a Leading Role, Outstanding British Film)
- Elephant (Best Short Film)
- Ex Machina (Best Actress in a Supporting Role, Best Original Screenplay, Outstanding British Film, Outstanding Debut by a British Writer, Director or Producer, Best Special Visual Effects)
- The Lady in the Van (Best Actress in a Leading Role)
- The Lobster – (Outstanding British Film)
- The Martian (Best Director, Best Actor in a Leading Role, Best Special Visual Effects)
- Room (Best Adapted Screenplay)
- Shaun the Sheep Movie (Best Animated Film)
- Steve Jobs (Best Actor in a Leading Role, Best Adapted Screenplay)
- The Survivalist (Outstanding Debut by a British Writer, Director or Producer)
- Theeb (Best Film Not in the English Language)
- Alex Garland (Best Original Screenplay, Outstanding Debut by a British Writer, Director or Producer) – Ex Machina
- Andy Nelson (Best Sound) – Bridge of Spies and Star Wars: The Force Awakens
- Bel Powley (EE Rising Star Award)
- Christian Bale (Best Supporting Actor) – The Big Short
- Debbie Tucker Green (Outstanding Debut by a British Writer, Director or Producer) – Second Coming
- Eddie Redmayne (Best Actor in a Leading Role) – The Danish Girl
- Esther Smith (Best Short Film) – Elephant
- Idris Elba (Best Supporting Actor) – Beasts of No Nation
- Julie Walters (Best Actress in a Supporting Role) – Brooklyn
- Maggie Smith (Best Actress in a Leading Role) – The Lady in the Van
- Mark Burton (Best Animated Film) – Shaun the Sheep Movie
- Mark Ardington (Best Special Visual Effects) – Ex Machina
- Nick Helm (Best Short Film) – Elephant
- Paul Norris (Best Special Visual Effects) – Ex Machina
- Richard Starzak (Best Animated Film) – Shaun the Sheep Movie
- Ridley Scott (Best Director) – The Martian
- Roger Deakins (Best Cinematography) – Sicario
- Sandy Powell (Best Costume Design) – Carol and Cinderella
- Sean McAllister (Outstanding Debut by a British Writer, Director or Producer) – A Syrian Love Story
- Stephen Fingleton (Outstanding Debut by a British Writer, Director or Producer) – The Survivalist
- Stuart Wilson (Best Sound) – Star Wars: The Force Awakens
- Taron Egerton (EE Rising Star Award)

=== Critics' Choice Awards ===
The 21st Critics' Choice Awards was held on 17 January 2016.

British winners:

- Amy (Best Documentary Feature)
- The Danish Girl (Best Supporting Actress)
- Ex Machina (Best Sci-Fi/Horror Movie)
- Room (Best Actress, Best Young Actor/Actress)
- Christian Bale (Best Actor in a Comedy)
- Jenny Beavan (Best Costume Design) – Mad Max: Fury Road
- Tom Hardy (Best Actor in an Action Movie) – Mad Max: Fury Road

British nominees:

- Brooklyn (Best Picture, Best Actress, Best Adapted Screenplay, Best Art Direction, Best Costume Design)
- Carol (Best Picture, Best Director, Best Actress, Best Supporting Actress, Best Art Direction, Best Costume Design, Best Costume Design, Best Score, Best Hair and Makeup)
- The Danish Girl (Best Actor, Best Art Direction, Best Costume Design, Best Hair and Makeup)
- Ex Machina (Best Original Screenplay, Best Visual Effects)
- Fifty Shades of Grey (Best Original Song)
- The Look of Silence (Best Documentary Feature)
- The Martian (Best Picture, Best Director, Best Actor, Best Adapted Screenplay, Best Sci-Fi/Horror Movie, Best Art Direction, Best Cinematography, Best Editing, Best Visual Effects)
- Room (Best Picture, Best Adapted Screenplay,
- Shaun the Sheep Movie (Best Animated Feature)
- Spectre (Best Actor in an Action Movie, Best Original Song)
- Writing's on the Wall from Spectre (Best Original Song)
- Steve Jobs (Best Actor, Best Supporting Actress)
- Simple Song#3"' from 'Youth (Best Original Song)
- Alex Garland (Best Original Screenplay) – Ex Machina
- Charlotte Rampling (Best Actress) – 45 Years
- Daniel Craig (Best Actor in an Action Movie) – Spectre
- Eddie Redmayne (Best Actor) – The Danish Girl
- Emily Blunt (Best Actress in an Action Movie) – Sicario)
- Eve Stewart (Best Production Design) – The Danish Girl
- Jason Statham (Best Actor in a Comedy) – Spy
- Helen Mirren (Best Supporting Actress) – Trumbo
- Kate Winslet (Best Supporting Actress) – Steve Jobs
- Mark Rylance (Best Supporting Actor) – Bridge of Spies
- Michael Standish (Best Production Design) – The Danish Girl
- Milo Parker (Best Young Actor/Actress) – Mr. Holmes
- Nick Hornby (Best Adapted Screenplay) – Brooklyn
- Ridley Scott (Best Director) – The Martian
- Roger Deakins (Best Cinematography) – Sicario
- Sandy Powell (Best Costume Design) – Carol and Cinderella
- Tom Hardy (Best Supporting Actor) – The Revenant

The 22nd Critics' Choice Awards was held on 11 December 2016.

British winners:

- Florence Foster Jenkins (Best Actress in a Comedy Movie)
- Andrew Garfield (Best Actor in an Action Movie) – Hacksaw Ridge

British nominees:

- A Monster Calls (Best Young Actor/Actress)
- Allied (Best Costume Design)
- Fantastic Beasts and Where to Find Them (Best Art Direction, Best Costume Design, Best Hair and Makeup, Best Visual Effects)
- Florence Foster Jenkins (Best Costume Design, Best Actor in a Comedy Movie)
- Hail, Caesar! (Best Comedy)
- Lion (Best Picture, Best Supporting Actor, Best Supporting Actress, Best Young Actor/Actress, Best Adapted Screenplay, Best Score)
- Loving (Best Picture, Best Actor, Best Actress, Best Original Screenplay)
- Andrew Garfield (Best Actor) – Hacksaw Ridge
- Anna Pinnock (Best Art Direction) – Fantastic Beasts and Where to Find Them
- David Mackenzie (Best Director) – Hell or High Water
- Hugh Grant (Best Actor) Florence Foster Jenkins
- Joanna Johnston (Best Costume Design) – Allied
- Joe Walker (Best Editing) – Arrival
- Kate Beckinsale (Best Actress in a Comedy Movie) – Love & Friendship
- Lewis MacDougall (Best Young Actor/Actress) – A Monster Calls
- Micachu (Best Original Score) – Jackie
- Stuart Craig (Best Art Direction) – Fantastic Beasts and Where to Find Them
- Tilda Swinton (Best ACtress in an Action Movie) – Doctor Strange

=== Golden Globe Awards ===
The 73rd Golden Globe Awards was held on 10 January 2016.

British winners:

- The Martian (Best Best Motion Picture – Musical or Comedy, Best Performance in a Motion Picture – Drama)
- Room (Best Performance in a Motion Picture – Drama)
- Spectre (Best Original Song)
- Steve Jobs (Best Supporting Performance in a Motion Picture, Screenplay)
- Jimmy Napes (Best Original Song) – Writing's on the Wall from Spectre
- Sam Smith (Best Original Song) – Writing's on the Wall from Spectre

British nominees:

- Brooklyn (Best Performance in a Motion Picture – Drama)
- Carol (Best Motion Picture – Drama Best Performance in a Motion Picture – Drama, Best Director, Best Original Score)
- The Danish Girl (Best Performance in a Motion Picture – Drama, Best Original Score)
- Ex Machina (Best Supporting Performance in a Motion Picture)
- Fifty Shades of Grey (Best Original Song)
- The Lady in the Van (Best Performance in a Motion Picture – Musical or Comedy)
- Room (Best Motion Picture – Drama, Best Screenplay)
- Shaun the Sheep Movie (Best Animated Feature Film)
- Steve Jobs (Best Performance in a Motion Picture – Drama, Best Supporting Performance in a Motion Picture, Best Original Score)
- Youth (Best Original Song)
- Christian Bale (Best Supporting Performance in a Motion Picture) – The Big Short
- Daniel Pemberton (Best Original Score) – Steve Jobs
- Eddie Redmayne (Best Performance in a Motion Picture – Drama) – The Danish Girl
- Maggie Smith (Best Performance in a Motion Picture – Musical or Comedy) – The Lady in the Van
- Mark Rylance (Best Supporting Performance in a Motion Picture) – Bridge of Spies
- Helen Mirren (Best Supporting Performance in a Motion Picture) – Trumbo
- Idris Elba (Best Supporting Performance in a Motion Picture) – Beasts of No Nation

=== Screen Actors Guild Awards ===
The 22nd Screen Actors Guild Awards was held on 29 January 2016.

British winners:

- The Danish Girl (Outstanding Performance by a Female Actor in a Supporting Role)
- Room (Outstanding Performance by a Female Actor in a Leading Roles)
- Idris Elba (Outstanding Performance by a Male Actor in a Supporting Role) – Beasts of No Nation

British nominees:

- Brooklyn (Outstanding Performance by a Female Actor in a Leading Role)
- Carol (Outstanding Performance by a Female Actor in a Leading Role, Outstanding Performance by a Female Actor in a Supporting Role)
- The Danish Girl (Outstanding Performance by a Male Actor in a Leading Role, )
- Everest (Outstanding Performance by a Stunt Ensemble in a Motion Picture)
- Room (Outstanding Performance by a Male Actor in a Supporting Role)
- Steve Jobs (Outstanding Performance by a Male Actor in a Leading Role, Outstanding Performance by a Female Actor in a Supporting Role)
- Adewale Akinnuoye-Agbaje (Outstanding Performance by a Cast in a Motion Picture) – Trumbo
- Christian Bale (Outstanding Performance by a Male Actor in a Supporting Role) – The Big Short
- Eddie Redmayne (Outstanding Performance by a Male Actor in a Leading Role) – The Danish Girl
- Helen Mirren (Outstanding Performance by a Female Actor in a Supporting Role) – Trumbo, (Outstanding Performance by a Female Actor in a Leading Role) – Woman in Gold
- Idris Elba (Outstanding Performance by a Cast in a Motion Picture) – Beasts of No Nation
- Mark Rylance (Outstanding Performance by a Male Actor in a Supporting Role) – Bridge of Spies
- Rafe Spall (Outstanding Performance by a Cast in a Motion Picture) – The Big Short

== Deaths ==
Month	Date	Name	Age	Nationality	Profession	Notable films
January	4	Robert Stigwood	81	Australian-born British	Producer and impresario	Jesus Christ Superstar; Bugsy Malone; Saturday Night Fever; Grease; The Empire Strikes Back; Evita
January	12	Meg Mundy	101	English-American	Actress	Fatal Attraction; Ordinary People
January	13	Brian Bedford	80	English	Actor	Grand Prix; Robin Hood; Nixon; The Importance of Being Earnest
January	13	Conrad Phillips	90	English	Actor	The Temptress; Witness in the Dark; Murder, She Said; The Battle of the River Plate
January	14	Alan Rickman	69	English	Actor	Die Hard; Harry Potter films; Love Actually; Sweeney Todd: The Demon Barber of Fleet Street
January	14	David Bowie	69	English	Recording artist and actor	The Man Who Fell to Earth; Merry Christmas, Mr. Lawrence; Labyrinth
January	19	Sheila Sim	93	English	Actress	A Canterbury Tale; Great Day; Dancing with Crime; The Guinea Pig; Pandora and the Flying Dutchman
January	22	Anthony Simmons	93	English	Director and screenwriter	Your Money or Your Wife; Four in the Morning; Black Joy; The Optimists of Nine Elms
January	30	Frank Finlay	89	English	Actor	Othello; Cromwell; Gumshoe; The Three Musketeers (1973); The Pianist
February	5	Norman Hudis	88	English	Screenwriter	First six of the Carry On ... films; The Tommy Steele Story; Please Turn Over
February	18	Bruce Lacey	88	English	Actor and director	Help!; The Knack ...and How to Get It; Smashing Time; The Bliss of Mrs. Blossom
February	22	Douglas Slocombe	103	English	Cinematographer	Kind Hearts and Coronets; The Lion in Winter; The Great Gatsby (1974); Jesus Christ Superstar; Julia; Indiana Jones films]]
February	25	Jim Clark	84	English	Editor	The Innocents; Marathon Man; The Killing Fields; Vera Drake
February	26	Antony Gibbs	90	English	British	The Loneliness of the Long Distance Runner; The Knack ...and How to Get It; Performance; Walkabout; Fiddler on the Roof; Dune
March	4	Tony Dyson	68	English	Special effects artist	Star Wars; Moonraker; Superman II; Dragonslayer
March	7	Michael White	80	Scottish	Producer	Monty Python and the Holy Grail; The Rocky Horror Picture Show; My Dinner with Andre; Enigma
March	8	George Martin	80	English	Musician and composer	A Hard Day's Night; Yellow Submarine; Live and Let Die; Honky Tonk Freeway
March	9	Jon English	66	English-Australian	Actor, singer	Touch and Go; Walk the Talk
March	10	Ken Adam	85	English	Production designer	Goldfinger; Dr. Strangelove; Barry Lyndon; The Madness of King George; Addams Family Values
March	11	Keith Emerson	71	English-American	Composer	Godzilla: Final Wars; Nighthawks
March	13	Adrienne Corri	85	Scottish-Italian	Actress	The River; Doctor Zhivago; A Clockwork Orange
March	14	Sir Peter Maxwell Davies	81	English	Composer	The Boy Friend; The Devils
March	15	Sylvia Anderson	88	English	Producer and screenwriter	Thunderbirds Are Go; Thunderbird 6; Doppelgänger
March	17	Cliff Michelmore	96	English	Producer	All Your Own; Playbox
March	18	Barry Hines	76	English	Author and screenwriter	Kes; Looks and Smiles; The Gamekeeper
March	31	Douglas Wilmer	96	English	Actor, singer and comedian	El Cid; Hammerhead; The Vengeance of Fu Manchu; The Golden Voyage of Sinbad
March	31	Ronnie Corbett	85	Scottish	Actor	The Two Ronnies; No Sex Please, We're British; Casino Royale (1967)
April	8	David Swift	85	English	Actor	Drop the Dead Donkey; The Day of the Jackal; The Black Panther
April	13	Gareth Thomas	71	English	Actor	Blake's 7; The Ragman's Daughter; Juggernaut
April	17	Kit West	80	English	Special effects artist	Raiders of the Lost Ark; Young Sherlock Holmes; Return of the Jedi
April	18	Karina Huff	55	English-Italian	Actress	Time for Loving; Summer Games
April	18	John Rapley	81	English	Actor	The Elephant Man; Jane and the Lost City; White Hunter Black Heart
April	20	Guy Hamilton	93	English	Director	Goldfinger; The Colditz Story; Battle of Britain; Live and Let Die
April	20	Victoria Wood	62	English	Actress and comedian	The Wind in the Willows; The League of Gentlemen's Apocalypse
May	6	John Krish	92	British	Actor, radio and television personality	Unearthly Stranger; The Wild Affair; Jesus
May	19	Alan Young	96	British-born Canadian-American	Actor, radio and television personality	Mickey's Christmas Carol; The Alan Young Show; Mister Ed
May	24	Burt Kwouk	85	English	Actor	Goldfinger; Pink Panther films; Air America; Kiss of the Dragon
June	6	Sir Peter Shaffer	90	English	Screenwriter and playwright	Equus; Amadeus; Follow Me!
June	20	Barry Hanson	73	English	Producer	Runners; The Long Good Friday
June	22	Harry Rabinowitz	100	English	Composer	Chariots of Fire; Maurice; The Remains of the Day; The English Patient; The Talented Mr. Ripley; Cold Mountain
June	30	Joe Powell	94	English	Stuntman	The Guns of Navarone; Lawrence of Arabia; Zulu; Top Secret!
July	1	Robin Hardy	86	English	Director and screenwriter	The Wicker Man; The Fantasist; The Wicker Tree
July	2	Euan Lloyd	86	English	Producer	Paper Tiger; The Wild Geese; The Sea Wolves
July	5	William Lucas	91	English	Actor	The Shadow of the Cat; Night of the Big Heat; Tower of Evil
July	15	V. F. Perkins	79	English	Film critic
July	27	Sue Gibson	63	English	Cinematographer and director of photography	Mrs Dalloway; Saving Grace; Resident Evil; Alien vs. Predator
July	29	Ken Barrie	83	English	Actor and singer	Sharks' Treasure; Emily; The Silent Scream
July	29	Vivean Gray	92	English-Australian	Actor	Picnic at Hanging Rock; The Last Wave
August	13	Kenny Baker	81	English	Actor and musician	Star Wars; Time Bandits
August	20	Brian Rix	92	English	Actor	Reluctant Heroes; Dry Rot; The Night We Got the Bird; And the Same to You; Don't Just Lie There, Say Something!
September	5	Donald Ranvaud	62	British	Producer	Farewell My Concubine; Central Station; City of God; The Constant Gardener
October	23	Jane Alderman	77	British	Casting director	Bad Boys; Love Jones; Candyman; Poltergeist III
October	30	Simon Relph	76	British	Producer	The Return of the Soldier; Wetherby; Enchanted April; Hideous Kinky
November	5	John Carson	89	English	Actor	Act of Murder; Night Caller from Outer Space; The Plague of the Zombies; Thunderbird 6
November	14	Janet Wright	71	English-Canadian	Actress	McCabe & Mrs. Miller; The Perfect Storm; Corner Gas: The Movie; Ramona and Beezus
November	23	Andrew Sachs	86	German-born English	Actor and musician	Revenge of the Pink Panther; Terry Pratchett's Going Postal; Quartet (2012)
November	25	David Hamilton	83	English	Director	Tender Cousins; A Summer in St. Tropez
November	27	Valerie Gaunt	84	English	Actress	The Curse of Frankenstein; Dracula (1958)
December	6	Andrew Sachs	93	English	Actor	Hammerhead; Porridge; The Remains of the Day; Les Misérables
December	14	Bernard Fox	89	Welsh	Actor	Hold On!; Herbie Goes to Monte Carlo; Titanic; The Mummy
December	14	Jeremy Summers	85	British	Director	The Punch and Judy Man; Ferry Cross the Mersey; The Vengeance of Fu Manchu
December	22	Philip Saville	86	English	Director and actor	Oedipus the King; Count Dracula; The Fruit Machine; The Gospel of John
December	24	Liz Smith	95	English	Actress	The French Lieutenant's Woman; A Private Function; We Think the World of You; Charlie and the Chocolate Factory

== See also ==
- Lists of British films
- 2016 in film
- 2016 in British music
- 2016 in British radio
- 2016 in British television
- 2016 in the United Kingdom
- List of 2016 box office number-one films in the United Kingdom
- List of British films of 2015
- List of British films of 2017
