= Gerry Bamman =

American retired actor (born 1941)

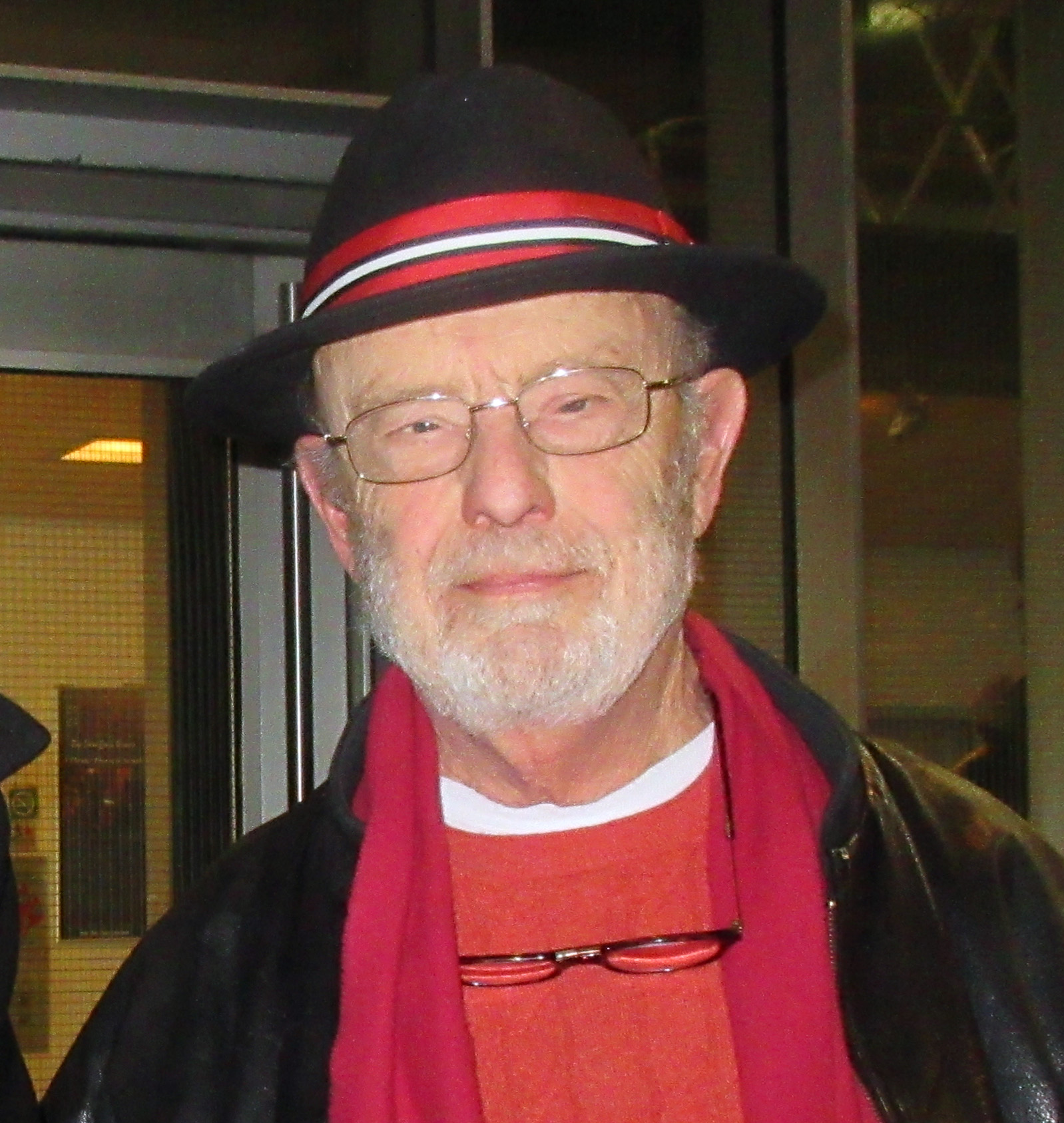
- Bamman in 2019
- Born: September 18, 1941 (age 85); Independence, Kansas, U.S.
- Education: New York University (MFA)
- Occupations: Actor; playwright
- Years active: 1965–2025
- Spouse: Emily Mann (m. 1981, divorced)
- Children: 1

Gerald G. Bamman (born September 18, 1941) is an American retired actor and playwright. He is best known for playing Frank McCallister, the ill-tempered uncle of Macaulay Culkin's character in the films Home Alone (1990) and Home Alone 2: Lost in New York (1992), and has also guest starred in several television series.

== Early life and education ==
Bamman was born on September 18, 1941, in Independence, Kansas, the son of Mary M. (née Farrell) and Harry W. Bamman. He studied at St. Francis de Sales School and later graduated from New York University with an MFA degree.

== Career ==
Bamman appeared with Fran Brill and Alyssa Milano in Old Enough (1984) and also in the Michael J. Fox film The Secret of My Success (1987). He had a minor role in Cocktail (1988) before portraying his most notable character, Uncle Frank McCallister in Home Alone and Home Alone 2: Lost in New York in 1990 and 1992, respectively. Bamman improvised the scene in Home Alone 2 where Frank is in the shower and Kevin (Macaulay Culkin) walks in on him. "I love the shower scene, even though I don’t think it was the funniest scene in the film," he told the Metro in 2020. "But it was great fun to shoot, because I really had fun padding it out. [The director] Chris [Columbus] started to give me directions and choreograph the scene and I said, 'Wait, wait, just let me show you what I've done, and what I have in mind'. And he bought it."

Also in 1992, Bamman appeared briefly as Kevin Costner's former colleague Ray Court in the box office smash The Bodyguard. Bamman appeared as defense attorney Stan Gillum in several episodes of Law & Order and Law & Order: Special Victims Unit. Bamman was also in the first season episode "The Blue Wall" playing Lt. Kennedy of Internal Affairs. Bamman co-starred in Runaway Jury as the blind jury foreman Herman Grimes. Bamman also played Dr. Judalon in the 1992 film Lorenzo's Oil.

In addition to his film and television work, he is also an experienced stage actor. He has performed in many theatrical shows conceived by playwright Henrik Ibsen and has translated several of his plays.

== Personal life ==
Bamman was married to director Emily Mann on August 12, 1981, but is now divorced from her. They have one son, Nicholas, born in 1983.

== Filmography ==
=== Film ===
Year	Title	Role	Director
1984	Old Enough	Mr. Sloan	Marisa Silver
1987	The Secret of My Success	Art Thomas	Herbert Ross
1987	Hiding Out	Mr. Stevens	Bob Giraldi
1988	Cocktail	Tourist	Roger Donaldson
1989	True Believer	Brian Nevins	Joseph Ruben
1989	Bloodhounds of Broadway	Inspector McNamara	Howard Brookner
1989	Pink Cadillac	Buddy	Buddy Van Horn
1990	Desperate Hours	Ed Tallent	Michael Cimino
1990	Home Alone	Frank McCallister	Chris Columbus
1991	Married to It	Arthur Everson	Arthur Hiller
1992	Home Alone 2: Lost in New York	Frank McCallister	Chris Columbus
1992	The Bodyguard	Ray Court	Mick Jackson
1992	Lorenzo's Oil	Doctor Judalon	George Miller
1994	The Puppet Masters	Viscott	Stuart Orme
1996	The Long Kiss Goodnight	CIA Man (uncredited)	Renny Harlin
1998	Great Expectations	Ted Rabinowitz	Alfonso Cuarón
1998	Of Love & Fantasy (video)	Peddleman	Kenneth M. Waddell
1999	The Confession	Psychiatrist	David Hugh Jones
1999	Superstar	Father John	Bruce McCulloch
1999	Cross-Eyed	Unnamed/Unknown role	Rudolf Steiner
2000	Passion of Mind	Edward Youngerman	Alain Berliner
2000	Two Family House	Mr. Pine	Raymond De Felitta
2000	Urbania	Don	Jon Shear
2001	Double Whammy	Mayor	Tom DiCillo
2003	Runaway Jury	Herman Grimes	Gary Fleder
2004	The Cookout	Chives the Butler (credited as "Butler")	Lance Rivera
2004	Around the Bend	Albert	Jordan Roberts
2009	A Secret Promise	Stuart Curtis	Fred Manocherian

=== Short film ===
Year	Title	Role
1998	The Way to Santiago	Lindsey Kellar
2001	Born Loser	Mr. Vales
2002	Abbie Down East	Father
2005	The Foster Son	Bernie
2010	Harrow Island	Commander DeLay
2012	Alternate Sides	Sgt. Norman Wyatt Garfunkle
2024	The Second Oldest Man Alive	William Bennett

=== Television ===
Year	Title	Role	Notes
1984	American Playhouse	Father John Cronin	1 episode Season 3, Episode 14 − "Concealed Enemies: Part 1"
1986	Spenser: For Hire	Laurence Denning	1 episode Season 2, Episode 5 − "And Give Up Showbiz?"
1987	Crime Story	Gerry McNeeley	1 episode Season 1, Episode 21 − "Ground Zero"
1987	The Equalizer	Congressman	1 episode Season 3, Episode 8 − "Shadow Play"
1987	Spenser: For Hire	William Reed	1 episode Season 3, Episode 9 − "Child's Play"
1989	A Man Called Hawk	Unnamed/unknown role	1 episode Season 1, Episode 4 − "Passing the Bar"
1990	Equal Justice	Judge Bayard Parkins	1 episode Season 1 − Pilot episode
1991	Loving	Rev. Ford	Unknown episode(s)
1991	Love, Lies and Murder	Mark Lockwood	Miniseries 2-part miniseries (appeared in both parts)
1991	L.A. Law	Judge Gary Gates	1 episode Season 5, Episode 15 − "The Beverly Hills Hangers"
1991	Law & Order	Internal Affairs Lt. Kennedy	1 episode Season 1, Episode 22 − "The Blue Wall"
1992	Swans Crossing	Captain Elia Walker	Unknown episode(s)
1993	Murder in the Heartland	Judge Brooks	Miniseries 2-part miniseries (appeared in both parts)
1995	New York News	Unnamed/unknown role	1 episode Season 1, Episode 11 − "Past Imperfect"
1995	Law & Order	Dean Pollard	1 episode Season 5, Episode 11 − "Guardian"
1996–2001	Law & Order	Stan Gillum	4 episodes Season 7, Episode 2 − "I.D."; Season 8, Episode 20 − "Burden"; Season 10, Episode 13 − "Panic"; Season 11, Episode 17 − "Ego"
1996	The Single Guy	Dr. Bradford	1 episode Season 2, Episode 9 − "Davy Jones"
1998	New York Undercover	Hicks	1 episode Season 4, Episode 3 − "Pipeline"
1998	Sex and the City	Shrink	1 episode Season 1, Episode 8 − "Three's a Crowd"
2000	Law & Order: Special Victims Unit	Craig Prince	1 episode Season 2, Episode 1 − "Wrong Is Right"
2002	Law & Order: Special Victims Unit	Attorney Schaefer	1 episode Season 4, Episode 2 − "Deception"
2002	Benjamin Franklin	Paul Wentworth	Miniseries 3-part miniseries (appeared in all parts): Episode 1: "Let the Experiment Be Made"; Episode 2: "The Making of a Revolutionary"; Episode 3: "The Chess Master"
2004–2005	Law & Order	Judge Thomas Everton	2 episodes Season 14, Episode 22 − "Gaijin"; Season 16, Episode 11 − "Bible Story"
2004	Rescue Me	Doctor	1 episode Season 1, Episode 7 − "Butterfly"
2007	American Experience	Peter Fenner	1 episode Season 19, Episode 15 − "Alexander Hamilton"
2008	Canterbury's Law	Judge Sydney Hanlon	2 episodes Season 1, Episode 2 − "Baggage"; Season 1, Episode 6 − "Sick as Your Secrets"
2010	Damages	Doctor	1 episode Season 3, Episode 13 − "The Next One's Gonna Go in Your Throat"
2012	Made in Jersey	Judge Harrison	1 episode Season 1, Episode 3 − "Camelot"
2014	The Good Wife	Diane's Client	1 episode Season 6, Episode 1 − "The Line"
2015	The Following	Charles	2 episodes Season 3, Episode 2 − "Boxed In"; Season 3, Episode 3 − "Exposed"
2025	The Waterfront	Jeb Parker	1 episode Season 1, Episode 7 − "Nice Try"

=== Television movies ===
Year	Title	Role	Notes
1984	Sentimental Journey	Artie	CBS film
1985	Brass	George Whitman	CBS film
1986	Courage	Assistant US Attourney	CBS film
1989	Manhunt: Search for the Night Stalker	Phil Thomas	NBC film
1990	Kojak: None So Blind	Warburton	CBS film
1991	The Chase	Peter	NBC film
1991	The 10 Million Dollar Getaway	Peter Greunwald	
2001	Second Honeymoon	Philip	CBS film
