= Uncle Howard =

- Film poster
- Directed by: Aaron Brookner
- Produced by: Paula Vaccaro; Sara Driver; Alex Garcia
- Starring: Howard Brookner; Aaron Brookner; Jim Jarmusch; Sara Driver; Tom DiCillo; William S. Burroughs; James Grauerholz; Robert Wilson
- Cinematography: Gregg de Domenico; André Döbert
- Release date: January 26, 2016 (Sundance)
- Running time: 96 minutes
- Countries: United States; United Kingdom
- Language: English

Uncle Howard is a 2016 documentary film about filmmaker Howard Brookner directed by Aaron Brookner.

== Synopsis ==
Director Howard Brookner died of AIDS in NYC in 1989 while in post-production on his breakthrough Hollywood movie. His body of work has been buried for 30 years in William S. Burroughs' bunker until his nephew Aaron Brookner unearths his story and the memory of everything he was.

== Production ==
Production of Uncle Howard began in 2012 when Aaron Brookner began to search for the missing print of the film Burroughs and Howard Brookner's wider archives. The search yielded the print of Burroughs (which, following a Kickstarter campaign, was digitally remastered and was subsequently re-released by The Criterion Collection and Janus Films), as well as a wide range of archives that reveal the story of Howard Brookner's life and work.

In February 2013 Uncle Howard (then called Smash The Control Machine) was presented in the Berlinale Talent Project Market, whereupon Jim Jarmusch was announced as executive producer. Aaron Brookner continued to shoot the project through until 2014, up until the special revival screening of Burroughs at the New York Film Festival, which united many friends and colleagues of Howard Brookner. Brookner and Jarmusch took part in a Q&A at the event with Tom DiCillo, and James Grauerholz.

=== Soundtrack ===
The film's soundtrack includes songs by Duke Ellington, Lotte Lenya, Vision Fortune, Lightspeed Champion, Josef Van Wissem, Mogwai, Younghusband, Grimm Grimm, The Pretenders and NEU!. The movie had Barry Hogan, founder of ATP, as a consultant and Frederic Schindler as music supervisor.

== Release ==
On December 2, 2015, it was announced that Uncle Howard would premiere in the US Documentary Competition category at the 2016 Sundance Film Festival. It has also been selected to be screened in the Panorama section of the 66th Berlin International Film Festival.

=== Critical reception ===
On review aggregator website Rotten Tomatoes, the film holds an approval rating of 91% based on 22 reviews, and an average rating of 6.8/10. On Metacritic, the film has a weighted average score of 73 out of 100, based on 8 critics, indicating "generally favorable reviews".
