= Box of Moonlight =

1996 film by Tom DiCillo

- Theatrical release poster
- Directed by: Tom DiCillo
- Written by: Tom DiCillo
- Produced by: Thomas Bliss; Marcus Viscidi
- Starring: John Turturro; Sam Rockwell; Catherine Keener; Lisa Blount; Annie Corley; Dermot Mulroney
- Cinematography: Paul Ryan
- Edited by: Camila Toniolo
- Music by: Jim Farmer
- Production companies: Lakeshore Entertainment; JVC Entertainment Networks; Largo Entertainment; Lemon Sky Productions
- Distributed by: Trimark Pictures (United States); Largo International (International)
- Release dates: August 30, 1996 (Italy); July 25, 1997 (U.S.)
- Running time: 112 minutes
- Countries: United States; Japan
- Language: English
- Budget: $3.5 million
- Box office: $782,641

Box of Moonlight is a 1996 American independent absurdist buddy comedy film written and directed by Tom DiCillo and starring John Turturro and Sam Rockwell in one of his earliest leading roles.

Set in the East Tennessee countryside, the film follows everyman Al Fountain (Turturro), an uptight electrical engineer who is assigned by his employer as the construction foreman of a factory under construction in Tennessee, leaving his estranged son and wife behind in their Chicago home.

The factory project is later called off shortly after Al's arrival in Tennessee. Al returns to his hotel room to discover a strand of gray hair, prompting him to breakdown. He later drives a rental car to nearby lake from his childhood and encounters a young hillbilly (Rockwell) that takes Al on an adventure through the nearby countrysides and towns to help him find a new perspective in life.

Filming took place on location in and around the city of Knoxville, Tennessee during a 35-day period in the fall of 1995, on a budget of $3.5 million.

The film premiered on August 30, 1996 at the Venice International Film Festival and opened to American audiences at the 1997 Sundance Film Festival.

== Plot summary ==
Al Fountain is a middle-aged uptight electrical engineer away from his family in Chicago overseeing the construction of his company's newest manufacturing plant in the rural town of Drip Rock, Tennessee. He is mocked by the blue collar construction crew he manages until the project is called off by his company, leaving him left with nothing to do in Tennessee.

Al decides to get a rental car to take a side trip for nostalgia's sake in the woodland area to find a Splatchee Lake, a tourist attraction from his childhood where he finds it polluted and encounters an elderly evangelical couple. On his way back to his hotel, he meets Buck "The Kid", an eccentric character who gives him a new perspective on his life. The two men bond with two women with similar personalities. The pair swap stories and ideas. The kid lives outside with many items and furniture in the woods. They rob a man's tomatoes from his garden and vandalize the factory that Al works at. The two part ways with Al having a different and freer outlook.

== Cast ==
- John Turturro as Al Fountain
- Sam Rockwell as Buck / Bucky / "The Kid"
- Catherine Keener as Floatie Dupre
- Lisa Blount as Purlene Dupre
- Dermot Mulroney as Wik
- Annie Corley as Deb Fountain
- Rica Martens as Doris
- Alexander Goodwin as Bob Fountain
- Stuart Greer as "Stinky"
- Sam Gleason as Rental Car Lot Attendant

== Production ==
Production was done mostly in autumn of 1995 in and around Knoxville, Tennessee on a thirty-five day shooting schedule and a budget of 3.5 million dollars.

The motel that Turturro's character stays at during his trip is a now closed but still there is a motel in Maryville, Tennessee, that is named the 411 Motel, on Hwy 411 in Maryville, TN(35.714640°N 84.020166°W).

The strip club used was "Bambi's" on the Alcoa Highway which is now called Ball Gentlemen's Club in Knoxville, TN(35.909554°N 83.956060°W).

Many of the scenes were shot in South Knoxville near Seymour, Strawberry Plains, Greenback, and Norris Lake and have been drastically changed since shooting due to mining, suburban development, and culture.

The wrestling scenes that Al and The Kid watch were filmed during an actual Smoky Mountain Wrestling event with Buddy Landell as the good guy and Headbanger Thrasher as "Saddam Insane" in 1995.

Most of the in-town driving scenes were filmed in East and North Knoxville, Maryville, and Alcoa. Many of the routes are not consistent.

== Influence and reputation ==
Box of Moonlight has a cult following among Tom DiCillo and counterculture fans. Janet Maslin of The New York Times wrote in July 1997 that "the 1970s-style premise of Box of Moonlight is so dated and fanciful that this quixotic film winds up seeming amazingly fresh." On a July 26, 1997 episode of Siskel & Ebert, it received two thumbs up from Gene Siskel and Roger Ebert.

On the review aggregator website Rotten Tomatoes, 59% of 17 critics' reviews are positive, with an average rating of 6.6/10.

== DVD release ==
The 1998 Lions Gate release includes a "secret" commentary by Tom DiCillo that is not listed on the packaging.
