= Grant Forsberg =

American actor

- Born: July 22, 1959; Holden, Massachusetts, US
- Died: July 17, 2007 (aged 47); Studio City, California, US
- Occupations: Actor and businessman
- Years active: 1984–1989
- Spouse: Wanda Wen
- Children: Simone W. Forsberg, Dagnall W. Forsberg, and Odin Woodward-Wen

Grant Forsberg (July 22, 1959 – July 17, 2007) was an American actor, born in Holden, Massachusetts.

He was an actor, best known for Planes, Trains & Automobiles (1987), Old Friends (1984) and Bloodhounds of Broadway (1989).

Away from the film industry, Forsberg co-founded Soolip Inc., with his wife, Wanda Wen. The business is based in North Hollywood, California, and is a manufacturer and retailer of handmade custom invitations, paper and lifestyle accessories. He was also producer and a co-author of the book Lost Boys Never Say Die (1991).
