= Indiana University Cinema =

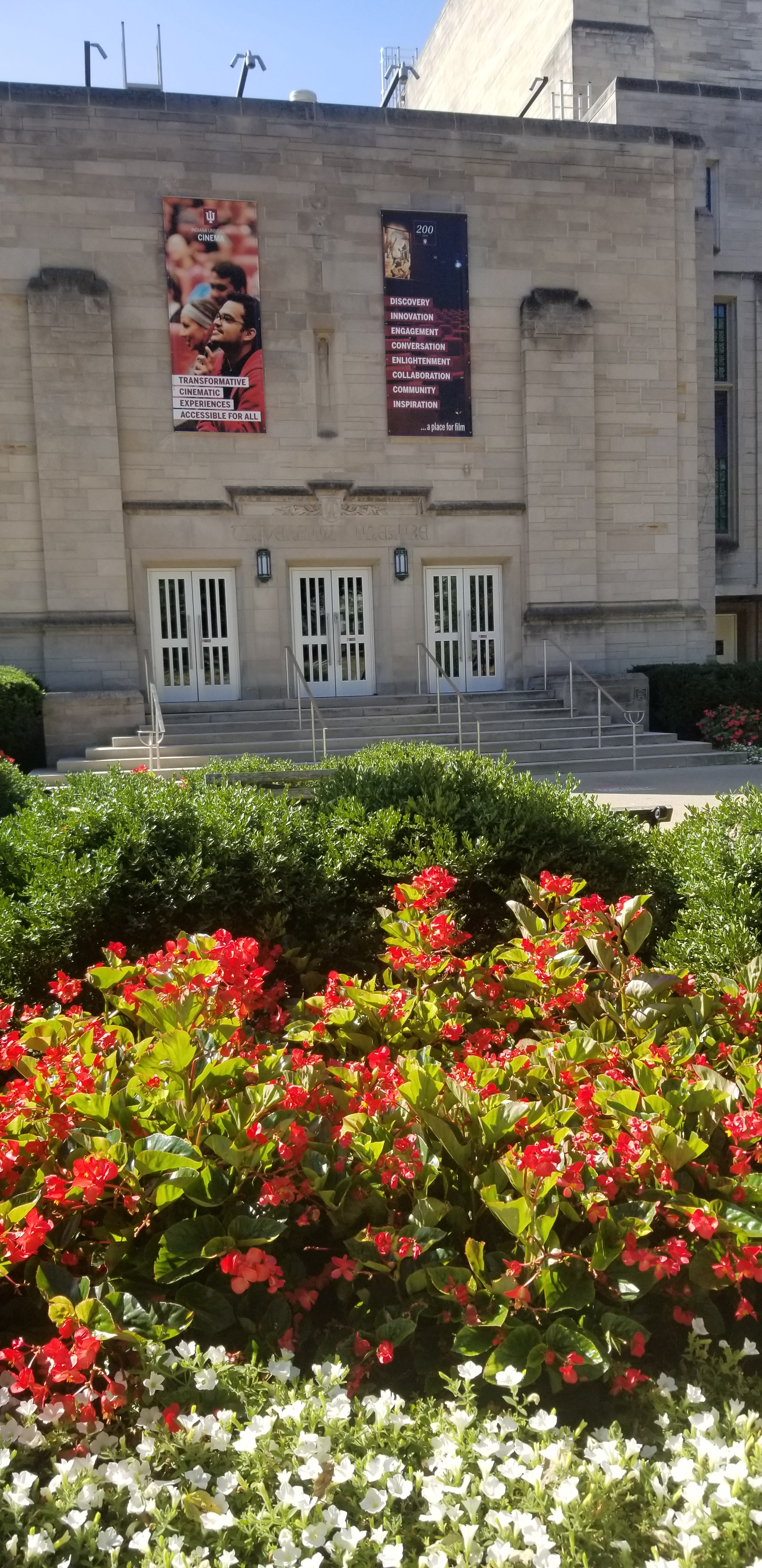
Indiana University Cinema

The Indiana University Cinema is an art film cinema located in Bloomington, Indiana, USA, on the Indiana University campus. Opened in January 2011 under the direction of Jon Vickers, the cinema occupies the former University Theatre building, which was built in the 1930s.

The cinema features a variety of film series, restorations, award-winning arts films and new releases.

== Director ==
Jon Vickers, former directing manager of the DeBartolo Performing Arts Center at the University of Notre Dame, was appointed as the first director of the IU Cinema on 22 March 2010. At the time of his appointment, the building was undergoing renovations that started in October 2009. As director, Vickers works with the university to develop each semester's program for the cinema, as well as working on independent film projects. In addition to his experience at Notre Dame, Vickers has been operating an independent art film cinema of his own since 1996, which he opened with his wife in Three Oaks, Michigan, as the Vickers Theatre.

== Facilities and technology ==
The IU Cinema projection room includes 16 mm and 35 mm reel-to-reel projectors as well as 2K and 4K digital cinema projectors. In January 2011, the IU Cinema became the second theatre in Indiana to become THX certified, after the University of Notre Dame's DeBartolo Performing Arts Center. The cinema is also equipped to play 3D films in Dolby 3D.

== Film collection archives ==
The Indiana University Libraries Film Archive (IULFA), held by the university's libraries, is varied in terms of collections. Most of its films are academically oriented. It contains more than 55,000 films spanning 80 years of film production, including many rare and last-remaining copies of prominent 20th-century films. The library holds works by filmmakers including John Ford, Orson Welles, Peter Bogdanovich and Clifford Odets. In conjunction with the IULFA, the Kinsey Institute holds approximately 8,000 educational films relating to human sexuality. The Black Film Center & Archive is home to many African-American historical films from 1920 to the present. The David Bradley Film Collection consists of an anthology of more than 2,000 films exhibiting early developments of filmmaking. The collection also includes comedies.

== Jorgensen lecture series ==
The cinema invites filmmakers as participants in the Jorgensen Guest Filmmaker Lectures. The German-born filmmaker Werner Herzog was a guest speaker in September 2012; he lectured at the cinema and had ten of his films exhibited. Other guest filmmakers include Albert Maysles, Peter Bogdanovich, David Anspaugh, Angelo Pizzo, Charles Burnett, Claire Denis and Walter Salles.

== Programs ==
Programs offered by the IU Cinema include both film screening and guest lectures. It has had more than 340 different public programs since its opening. Up to 15 April 2012, almost 40,000 tickets had been sold to students and community members. The IU Cinema partners with community organizations as well as more than 40 academic departments at Indiana University-Bloomington.
