= Tom DiCillo =

American Filmmaker

- Born: Thomas A. DiCillo; August 14, 1953 (age 73); Camp Lejeune, North Carolina, U.S.
- Occupations: Film director, screenwriter, cinematographer
- Years active: 1979–present

Thomas A. DiCillo (born August 14, 1953) is an American film director, screenwriter, cinematographer, and musician.

== Early life ==
DiCillo was born in Camp Lejeune, North Carolina. His father was Italian and his mother was from New England. He studied creative writing at Old Dominion University in Norfolk, Virginia and went on to study filmmaking at New York University's Film School alongside Jim Jarmusch, Howard Brookner, Sara Driver and Spike Lee. Subsequently, he worked as an actor and cinematographer, before making films.

== Career ==
His first film, Johnny Suede (1991), featured Brad Pitt and Catherine Keener in what would be their first starring roles. It received a nomination for a Grand Jury Prize at the Sundance Film Festival.

For his second film, Living in Oblivion (1995), DiCillo received acclaim for his satire of independent film-making. The 1995 black comedy, itself a low-budget independent film, features Steve Buscemi as a director driven to near-madness by his cast and crew, including a vain Hollywood actor. Describing the inspiration for and origin of Living in Oblivion in an interview with Salon, DiCillo described making a movie as "one of the most tedious, boring, painful experiences, and that's just when something goes right".

His fifth film, Double Whammy (2001), was released straight to video. Delirious (2006), a comedy starring Steve Buscemi, Michael Pitt, Alison Lohman and Elvis Costello, was screened at the San Sebastian Film Festival where it won three awards (Best Director, Best Original Screenplay, and the Signis Award for originality). The film also screened at the Sundance Film Festival in 2007 and won Best Director at the HBO Comedy Film Festival in Aspen, Colorado.

DiCillo wrote and directed When You're Strange (2009), a documentary about the rock band The Doors, which premiered at the Sundance Film Festival and was nominated for a Grand Jury Prize. It was subsequently nominated for both an Emmy Award, after airing on PBS' American Masters series, and a Grammy Award for Best Long Form Video.

DiCillo has published books of two of his screenplays, Living in Oblivion and Box of Moonlight. Both books contain the full scripts along with commentary, stories and anecdotes. DiCillo also directed "Weeping Willow", a sixth season episode of the television series Law & Order: Criminal Intent, inspired by the lonelygirl15 videos on YouTube.

== Filmography ==
=== As director ===
- Johnny Suede (1991)
- Living in Oblivion (1995)
- Box of Moonlight (1996)
- The Real Blonde (1997)
- Double Whammy (2001)
- Delirious (2006)
- When You're Strange (Documentary) (2009)
- Down in Shadowland (Documentary) (2014)

=== As cinematographer ===
- Permanent Vacation (1980)
- Underground USA (1980)
- Burroughs (1983)
- Variety (1983)
- Stranger Than Paradise (1984)
- Robert Wilson and the Civil Wars (1987)
- Robinson's Garden (1987)
- The Beat (1987)
- Laura Ley (1989)
- End of the Night (1990)
- Coffee and Cigarettes (2003)
