= Bloodhounds of Broadway (1989 film) =

1989 film by Howard Brookner

- Theatrical release poster
- Directed by: Howard Brookner
- Written by: Howard Brookner; Colman deKay
- Based on: "The Bloodhounds of Broadway" "A Very Honorable Guy" "The Brain Goes Home" "Social Error" by Damon Runyon
- Produced by: Howard Brookner
- Starring: Matt Dillon; Jennifer Grey; Julie Hagerty; Rutger Hauer; Madonna; Esai Morales; Anita Morris; Randy Quaid
- Cinematography: Elliot Davis
- Edited by: Camilla Toniolo
- Music by: Jonathan Sheffer
- Production company: American Playhouse
- Distributed by: Columbia Pictures
- Release date: November 3, 1989
- Running time: 93 minutes
- Country: United States
- Language: English
- Budget: $4 million
- Box office: $43,671

Bloodhounds of Broadway is a 1989 American ensemble period comedy film based on four Damon Runyon stories: "The Bloodhounds of Broadway", "A Very Honorable Guy", "The Brain Goes Home" and "Social Error". Directed by Howard Brookner, the film stars Matt Dillon, Jennifer Grey, Anita Morris, Julie Hagerty, Rutger Hauer, Madonna, Esai Morales and Randy Quaid. Madonna and Grey perform the duet "I Surrender Dear" during the film. Madonna earned a nomination for the Golden Raspberry Award for Worst Supporting Actress for her performance in the film at the 10th Golden Raspberry Awards.

Bloodhounds of Broadway was Brookner's only feature-length film, as he died shortly before the film opened. The film was recut by the studio and a Walter Winchell-style narration was added. The film received negative reviews. Six months following its theatrical release, the film was televised as a presentation of PBS's American Playhouse on May 23, 1990.

== Plot ==
On Broadway during New Year's Eve, 1929, muckraking reporter Waldo Winchester frames four major stories.

The story starts in a diner. The Brain, a gangster with multiple girlfriends, is accompanied by a gambler named Regret (after the only horse he ever placed a winning bet) and an outsider who (with his bloodhounds) is being treated to a meal. Feet Samuels (so named because of his big feet) is in love with a showgirl named Hortense Hathaway, who is tossed out of the diner because of an unsavory reputation. Feet plans to have one wild night before committing suicide, having sold his body in advance to medical doctor Bodeeker to avoid welching on a bet.

Harriet MacKyle, a sheltered but friendly socialite, makes arrangements with smooth-talking fixer Handsome Jack for a big party that night at her estate, where many of the players will later attend. She has an interest in the exciting but dangerous criminal element. Widow Mary, a girl selling flowers, comes in after Feet makes a full payment of a debt to the Brain, so the Brain offers $5 for a 5-cent flower, telling her to keep the change. But before he can leave, Sam the Skate, a hitman for the Brooklyn Mob stabs him. The wounded Brain tells his men to take him "home", but his many girlfriends refuse to allow him in for various reasons.

Feet gets involved in a high-stakes craps game. With considerable luck, he wins a massive payoff of money and jewelry. Regret suggests they find another game, but Feet reveals his plan to kill himself. Regret tries to talk him out of it, but Feet, sworn to see his last promise fulfilled, is adamant. Regret dials up Waldo, who is now at Harriet's party, and asks him to talk to his niece Hortense and get her to realize Feet is smitten with her.

Hortense must try to persuade Feet that she wants to quit her life as a lounge singer, move to New Jersey and raise a family. Regret, meanwhile, continues to be the world's unluckiest gambler, but showgirl Lovey Lou is in love with him anyway.

== Cast ==
- Matt Dillon as Regret
- Jennifer Grey as Louise "Lovey Lou"
- Julie Hagerty as Harriet MacKyle
- Rutger Hauer as The Brain
- Madonna as Hortense Hathaway
- Esai Morales as Handsome Jack
- Anita Morris as Miss Missouri Martin
- Ethan Phillips as Basil Valentine
- Randy Quaid as Feet Samuels
- Josef Sommer as Waldo Winchester
- Gerry Bamman as Inspector McNamara
- Jane Bruckner as Charlotte
- William Burroughs as Butler
- Steve Buscemi as Whining Willie
- Robert Donley as Doc Bodeeker
- Googy Gress as McGinty
- Tony Longo as Crunch Sweeney
- Dinah Manoff as Maud Milligan
- Stephen McHattie as Red Henry
- Mark Nelson as Sam the Skate
- Madeleine Potter as Widow Mary
- John Rothman as Marvin Clay
- Alan Ruck as John Wangle
- Fisher Stevens as Hotfoot Harry
- Michael Wincott as Soupy Mike
- Louis Zorich as Mindy
- Tony Azito as Waiter
- Richard Edson as Johnny Crackow
- Howard Brookner as Daffy Jack
- Nicole Burdette as Corner Woman
- Colman deKay as Nosmo
- Grant Forsberg as Cab Driver
- Veryle Rupp as Whitey
- Black-Eyed Susan as Minnie the Shrimp
- Tamara Tunie as Cynthia Harris
- Sara Driver as Yvette
- Leonard Termo as Goodtime Nate Fishkin
- Graham Brown as Doc Frischer
- Vince Giordano as Bandleader
- Nighthawks Orchestra as Band

== Production ==
Principal photography of the film began on December 24, 1987 and was completed on February 10, 1988. It was filmed in the New Jersey cities of Union City, Newark, Jersey City and Montclair.

== Reception ==
Bloodhounds of Broadway received negative reviews from critics, with Variety magazine calling it "a gangster's farce that falls somewhat short of true comic inspiration," and OutWeek magazine's Karl Soehnlein writing, "It has no sense of irony, or even foreboding, merely diluted nostalgia." Produced on a budget of $4 million, the film grossed less than $44,000 in its limited release.

== See also ==
- List of films set around New Year
