= Howard Brookner =

American film director

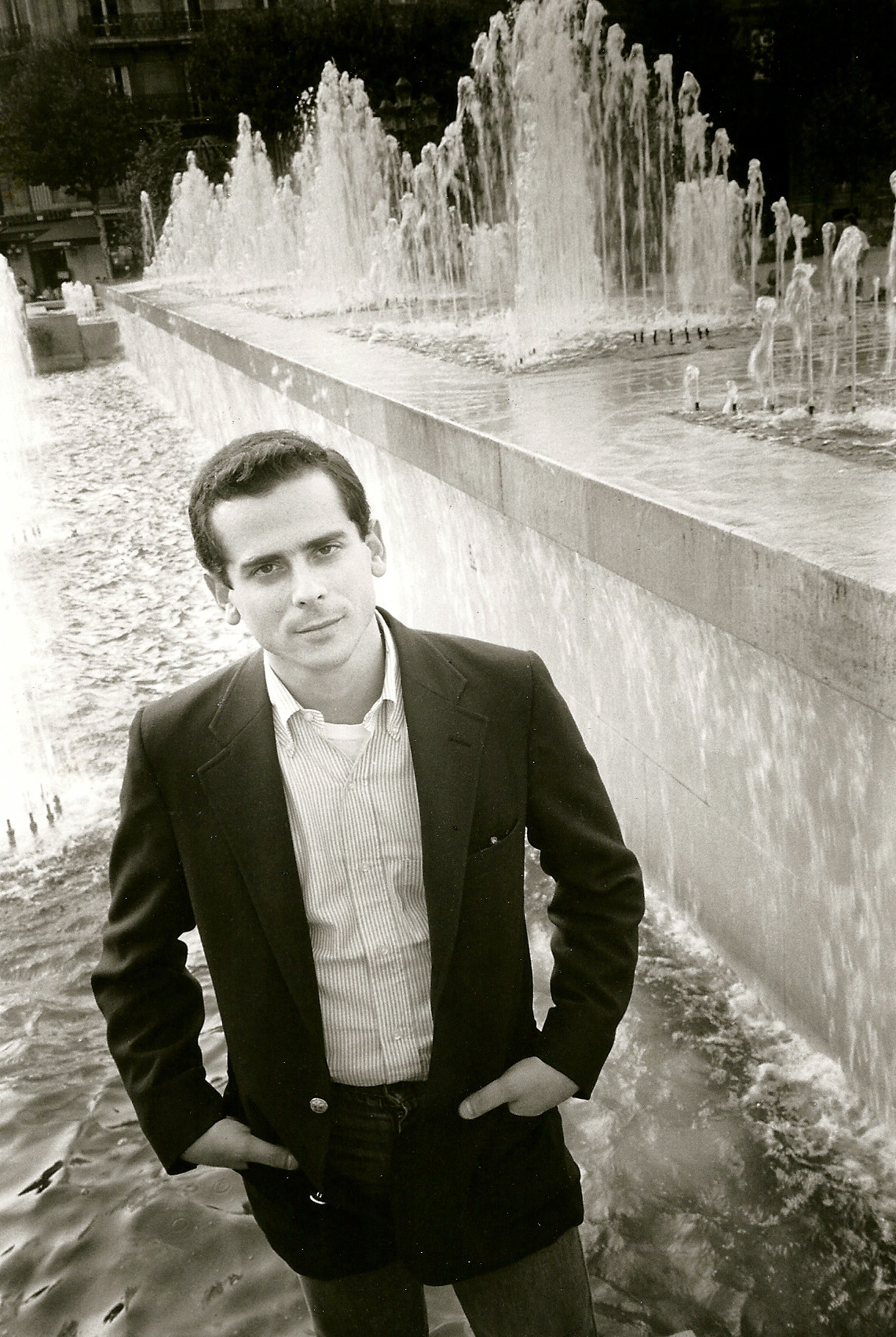
- Howard Brookner photographed by Paula Court, Paris, 1986
- Born: April 30, 1954; New York City, New York, U.S.
- Died: April 27, 1989 (aged 34); New York City, New York, U.S.
- Occupation: Film director
- Years active: 1978–1989

Howard Brookner (April 30, 1954 – April 27, 1989) was an American film director. He produced and directed the documentary Burroughs about William S. Burroughs (1983), Robert Wilson and the Civil Wars on theatre director Robert Wilson (1986), and directed, co-produced and co-wrote Bloodhounds of Broadway (1989).

== Biography ==
Howard Eric Brookner was born April 30, 1954, in New York City and grew up in Great Neck, Long Island. He studied at Phillips Exeter, earned his B.A. from Columbia University in political science, and his M.A. in art history and film at New York University, where for his senior thesis he began what would go on to be the highly acclaimed feature documentary on William S. Burroughs. His film crew consisted of his NYU classmates Tom DiCillo (camera) and Jim Jarmusch (sound).

Begun in 1978, Burroughs was aired on BBC Arena and premiered at the 1983 New York Film Festival. Janet Maslin of the New York Times wrote: "The quality of discovery about 'Burroughs' was very much the director's doing, and Mr. Brookner demonstrates an unusual degree of liveliness and curiosity in exploring his subject."

Brookner followed up Burroughs with a feature documentary on Robert Wilson, documenting Wilson's failed Civil Wars project, offering a closeness to the avant-garde theatre director similar to that in Burroughs. Robert Wilson and the Civil Wars was released on public television in 1986.

In 1987, Brookner began production on the American Playhouse/Columbia Studios feature he had written and was directing, Bloodhounds of Broadway starring Madonna, Matt Dillon, Jennifer Grey, Rutger Hauer, and others.

Secretly, Brookner was battling AIDS, which became exacerbated when he decided to go off his AZT medication to have the strength to finish shooting. The New York Times wrote it "was a race against the clock" as Brookner was gravely ill while fighting the studio for final cut and holding readings for his next film Scary Kisses (with new acting talent that included Sean Penn and Tilda Swinton).

He died before Bloodhounds of Broadway was released and was buried on his thirty-fifth birthday, 1989. Surrounded by friends and family, he left this quote taped to his refrigerator door: "There's so much beauty in the world. That's what got me into trouble in the first place."

== Filmography ==
- Burroughs (1983)
- Robert Wilson and the Civil Wars (1986)
- Bloodhounds of Broadway (1989)
- Scary Kisses (unfinished)

Other Credits

- Gaffer: Permanent Vacation (1980) – Directed by Jim Jarmusch

Uncredited

- Footage of William S. Burroughs and Andy Warhol, shot during Burroughs, appears in the BBC Arena episode Chelsea Hotel
- Footage of William S. Burroughs and Francis Bacon, shot during Burroughs, appears in the BBC Arena short film Bacon Meets Burroughs

== Archive and restoration ==
In 2012, Howard Brookner's archive was discovered in a number of locations in both the United States and Europe. The collection included 16mm film, reel to reel and mag sound, cassette tapes, 8mm film, VHS, video 8, and personal documents including letters, photos and writings. Some of the material contained never before seen out-takes of Burroughs, including those with Andy Warhol, Patti Smith, Brian Jones and Brion Gysin. The material was all shot by and for Howard Brookner between the late 1970s and end of the 1980s.

On November 28, 2012, Howard Brookner's nephew Aaron Brookner launched a Kickstarter campaign to finance digital restoration of Howard Brookner's out of print film Burroughs. The campaign was successful, gaining $21,360 from 283 backers, beating the initial goal of $20,000. The extra money raised during the campaign, not required for Burroughs, was designated towards preserving and restoring Brookner's wider archives.

The re-release of Burroughs coincided with the celebration of William S. Burroughs' one-hundredth birthday, in the year 2014.

== Uncle Howard ==
Uncle Howard is a feature documentary by director Aaron Brookner, nephew of Howard Brookner. The documentary follows Aaron's search for and restoration of Howard Brookner's archives including Burroughs and Robert Wilson and the Civil Wars.

Simultaneously the film tells Howard Brookner's story from his early filmmaking career at NYU, through his three completed features and up until his death in 1989. The film features contributions from numerous colleagues and friends of Howard's and is executive produced by Jim Jarmusch.

On December 2, 2015, it was announced that Uncle Howard would premiere in the U.S. Documentary Competition category at the 2016 Sundance Film Festival.
