= List of Monica Bellucci performances =

Italian actor

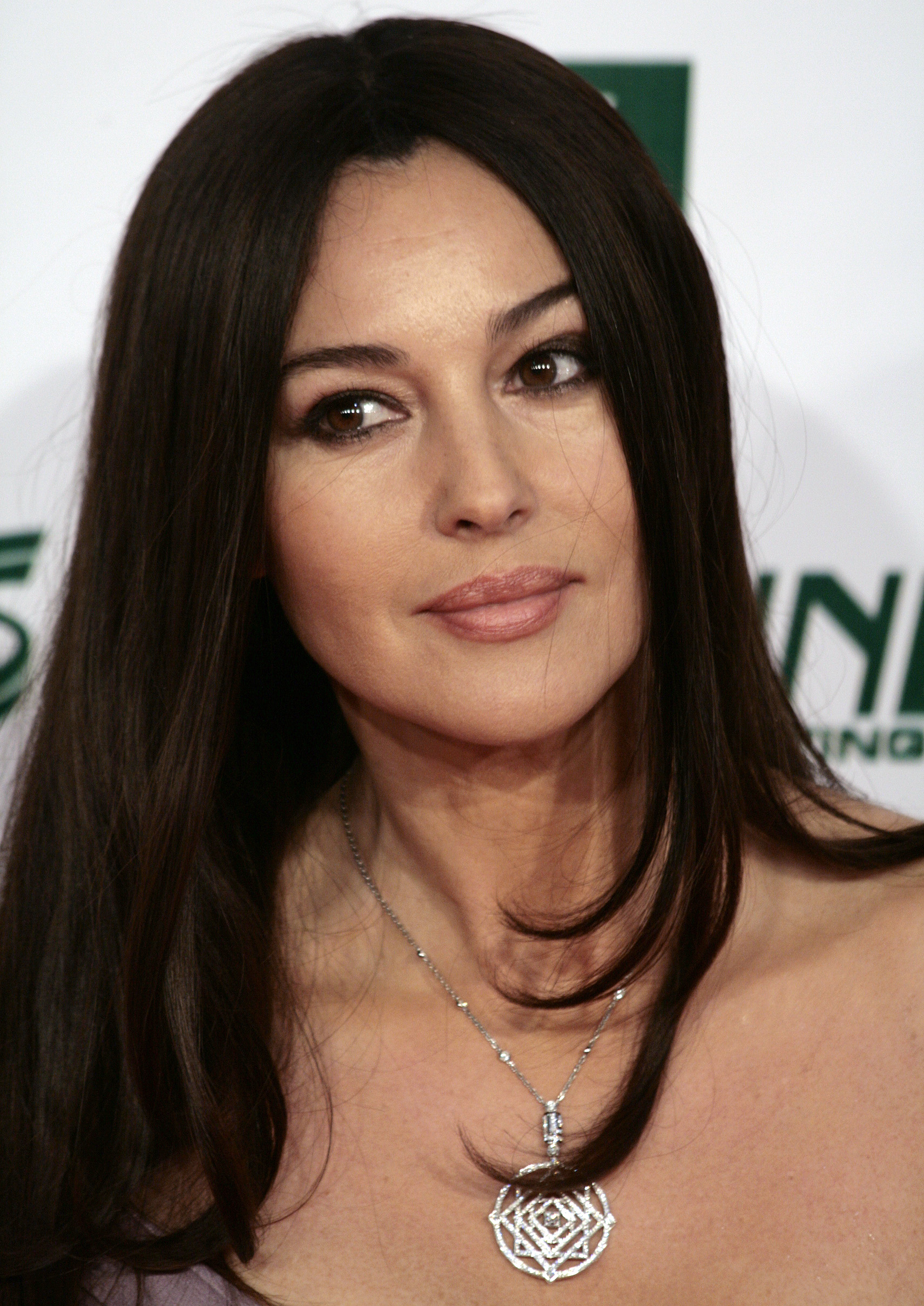
Bellucci at the 2009 Women's World Award

Monica Bellucci is an Italian actor whose international filmography primarily encompasses films and television programs in her native Italy, the United States, and France. She made her Italian debut in the television miniseries Vita coi figli in 1991 and in the film The Raffle the same year. Her first credited named role in the United States was as one of the three brides in Francis Ford Coppola's horror film Bram Stoker's Dracula in 1992. She starred in Italian productions for the next four years and in the television miniseries, Joseph (1995). Her French debut and breakthrough role was in the arthouse film The Apartment (1996), which garnered Bellucci a César Award nomination for Most Promising Actress. Her role as Giulia Giovannini in the Italian comedy-drama film L'ultimo capodanno earned her a Globo d'oro Award for Best Actress in 1998.

Bellucci performed her first English-language lead role in the American thriller Under Suspicion in 2000. The same year, she portrayed Malèna Scordia in the drama Malèna, which launched her global popularity. She appeared consecutively in two French blockbuster films, the historical epic Brotherhood of the Wolf (2001) and the comedy Asterix & Obelix: Mission Cleopatra (2002), portraying Cleopatra in the latter one. She co-starred in the 2002 French thriller Irréversible, regarded as a highly controversial film. Bellucci played Alessia in the Italian film Remember Me, My Love (2003), for which she received the Nastro d'Argento Award for Best Supporting Actress and her first nomination for a David di Donatello Award in the same category. She then portrayed Persephone in two sci-fi films from The Matrix franchise released in 2003, The Matrix Reloaded and The Matrix Revolutions. For her portrayal of Mary Magdalene in the Mel Gibson-directed drama The Passion of the Christ (2004), she was nominated for a Nastro d'Argento for Best Supporting Actress. In 2006, she lent her voice to the French version of the American animated film Robots.

In 2010, Bellucci portrayed Laura Leviani in Larysa Kondracki's biopic drama thriller The Whistleblower. She starred opposite Robert De Niro in The Ages of Love (2011) and Behrouz Vossoughi in Rhino Season (2012). For her portrayal of Sophie in the Canadian film Ville-Marie in 2015, she received Best Actress from the Dublin Film Critics' Circle. She followed this with Spectre (2015), in which she played Lucia Sciarra, becoming at the age of 50 the oldest Bond girl in James Bond history. She portrayed opera singer Alessandra in the third season (2016) of the American comedy-drama streaming television series Mozart in the Jungle. That same year she starred in Emir Kusturica's On the Milky Road, a story that took place during the Yugoslav Wars, and it earned her the Nastro d'Argento Europeo. In 2018, she guest starred on the French television series Call My Agent!, and played an evil demon in the Australian comedy science fiction film Nekrotronic. In 2019 she made her stage debut in Paris, performing a series of monologues based on the letters and memoirs of Maria Callas under the direction of Tom Volf at the Théâtre Marigny.

== Film ==
Key
†	Denotes films that have not yet been released.

Year	Title	Role	Notes	Ref.
1991	The Raffle	Francesca		
1992	Bram Stoker's Dracula	One of Dracula's brides		
1992	Ostinato Destino	Marina and Angela		
1994	Briganti – Amore e libertà	Costanza		
1994	The Heroes	Deborah		
1995	Snowball	Theo's mother		
1996	Bits and Pieces			
1996	The Apartment	Lisa		
1996	Come mi vuoi	Nellina		
1997	Dobermann	Nat the Gypsy		
1997	Stressati			
1997	Mauvais genre	Camille		
1998	Le Plaisir (et ses petits tracas)	Girl		
1998	Compromis	Monique	Short film	
1998	Kaputt Mundi	Giulia Giovannini		
1998	A los que aman	Valeria		
1999	That Certain Something			
1999	Comme un poisson hors de l'eau	Myrtille		
1999	Méditerranées	Marguerite		
1999	Franck Spadone	Laura		
1999	Dear Father (Note: Olivier Megaton's Dear Father is included as a bonus feature on the DVD release of Exit.)		Short film	
2000	Under Suspicion	Chantal Hearst		
2000	Malèna	Malèna Scordia		
2001	Brotherhood of the Wolf	Sylvia		
2002	Asterix & Obelix: Mission Cleopatra	Cleopatra		
2002	Irréversible	Alex		
2003	Remember Me, My Love	Alessia		
2003	Tears of the Sun	Dr. Lena Fiore Kendricks		
2003	The Matrix Reloaded	Persephone		
2003	The Matrix Revolutions	Persephone		
2004	The Passion of the Christ	Mary Magdalene		
2004	Secret Agents	Barbara and Lisa		
2004	She Hate Me	Simona Bonasera		
2005	The Brothers Grimm	The Mirror Queen		
2005	How Much Do You Love Me?	Daniela		
2006	Sheitan	Vampire girl	Cameo	
2006	Napoleon and Me	Baroness Emilia Speziali		
2006	The Stone Council	Laura Siprien		
2007	Manual of Love 2	Lucia		
2007	Shoot 'Em Up	Donna Quintano		
2007	The Second Wind	Manouche		
2008	Wild Blood	Luisa Ferida		
2008	The Man Who Loves	Alba		
2009	Don't Look Back	Jeanne		
2009	The Private Lives of Pippa Lee	Gigi Lee		
2009	Baarìa	Bricklayer's girlfriend		
2009	Omaggio a Roma	Tosca	Documentary	
2010	The Whistleblower	Laura Leviani		
2010	The Sorcerer's Apprentice	Veronica Gorloisen		
2011	The Ages of Love	Viola		
2011	A Burning Hot Summer	Angele		
2012	Rhino Season	Mina		
2013	Des gens qui s'embrassent	Giovanna		
2014	The Wonders	Milly Catena		
2014	Na Quebrada			
2015	Ville-Marie	Sophie Bernard		
2015	Spectre	Lucia Sciarra		
2016	On the Milky Road	Nevesta or the Bride		
2018	Nekrotronic	Finnegan		
2019	The Best Years of a Life	Elena		
2019	Spider in the Web	Angela		
2020	The Man Who Sold His Skin	Soraya Waldy		
2021	Les Fantasmes	Sabrina		
2021	La Befana vien di notte II – Le origini	Dolores		
2021	The Girl in the Fountain	Anita Ekberg / Herself	Hybrid documentary film	
2022	Memory	Davana Sealman		
2022	Dry	Valentina		
2022	Diabolik: Ginko Attacks!	Altea di Vallenberg		
2023	Mafia Mamma	Bianca		
2023	Maria Callas: Lettere e Memorie		Documentary	
2023	Diabolik: Who Are You?	Altea di Vallenberg		
2024	Dear Paris	Giovanna Bianchi		
2024	Beetlejuice Beetlejuice	Delores		
2026	The Birthday Party	Cristina		
2026	7 Dogs	Julia Leone	Saudi Arabian film	
2026	Ketticè			

=== Animated films ===
Year	Title	Voice role	Notes	Ref.
2003	Sinbad: Legend of the Seven Seas	Marina	French dub	
2005	Robots	Cappy	French dub	

== Television ==
Key
†	Denotes television programs that have not yet aired.

Year	Title	Role	Notes	Ref.
1991	Vita coi figli	Elda	Miniseries	
1995	Joseph	Pharaoh's wife	Miniseries; 2 x 90 mins	
1996	Sorellina e il principe del sogno		Miniseries	
2007	Heartango		Television short	
2010	Rose, c'est Paris (Note: The television film directed by Serge Bramly and Bettina Rheims supplemented the exhibition Rose, c'est Paris (Rose, this is Paris) presented at the National Library of France.)	L'esprit de Gala (Note: L'esprit de Gala translates to Gala's spirit.)	Television film; aired on Arte	
2011	R.I.S. Roma – Delitti imperfetti	Herself	1 episode	
2011	Platane	Herself	Season 1; episode 4: "La fois où Monica Bellucci a failli signer" (Note: "La fois où Monica Bellucci a failli signer" translates to "The time Monica Bellucci almost signed".)	
2016	Mozart in the Jungle	Alessandra	Season 3; 5 episodes	
2017	Twin Peaks: The Return	Herself (dream sequence)	Episode: "Part 14"	
2018	Il Miracolo	The Virgin Mary (dream sequence)	1 episode	
2018	Call My Agent!	Herself	Season 3; episodes 2 and 6	
2019	Do Not Disturb (Note: Do Not Disturb was created and directed by Michael Haussman.)		Anthology series	
2021	L'Amour flou	Valéria	9 episodes; aired on Canal+	
2024	Ça, c'est Paris		Miniseries	
TBA	Radical Eye: The Life and Times of Tina Modotti †	Tina Modotti	Biopic miniseries; 6 episodes	

=== Animation ===
Year	Title	Voice role	Notes	Ref.
2024	Ark: The Animated Series	Cassia Virila		

== Video games ==
Year	Title	Voice role	Notes	Ref.
2003	Enter the Matrix	Persephone		
2004	Prince of Persia: Warrior Within	Kaileena		
2005	The Matrix Online	Persephone		

== Theatre ==
Year	Title	Role	Venue	Ref.
2019	Maria Callas: Letters and Memoirs	Maria Callas	Théâtre Marigny	
2020	Maria Callas: Letters and Memoirs	Maria Callas	Théâtre des Bouffes-Parisiens	
2020	Maria Callas: Letters and Memoirs	Maria Callas	Festival dei Due Mondi	
2020	Maria Callas: Letters and Memoirs	Maria Callas	Odeon of Herodes Atticus	
2020	Maria Callas: Letters and Memoirs	Maria Callas	Théâtre Princesse Grace	
2021	Maria Callas: Letters and Memoirs	Maria Callas	Belém Cultural Center	
2021	Maria Callas: Letters and Memoirs	Maria Callas	Odeon of Herodes Atticus	
2021	Maria Callas: Letters and Memoirs	Maria Callas	Teatro Manzoni	
2021	Maria Callas: Letters and Memoirs	Maria Callas	Auditorium Parco della Musica	
2021	Maria Callas: Letters and Memoirs	Maria Callas	Teatro Goldoni	
2022	Maria Callas: Letters and Memoirs	Maria Callas	Opéra national de Montpellier	
2022	Maria Callas: Letters and Memoirs	Maria Callas	Theatre Royal Haymarket	
2022	Maria Callas: Letters and Memoirs	Maria Callas	His Majesty's Theatre	
2022	Maria Callas: Letters and Memoirs	Maria Callas	Zorlu PSM	
2022	Maria Callas: Letters and Memoirs	Maria Callas	Alexandrinsky Theatre	
2022	Maria Callas: Letters and Memoirs	Maria Callas	Vakhtangov Theatre	
2022	Maria Callas: Letters and Memoirs	Maria Callas	Festival Castell de Peralada	
2022	Maria Callas: Letters and Memoirs	Maria Callas	Théâtre du Châtelet	
2022	Maria Callas: Letters and Memoirs	Maria Callas	Los Angeles	
2023	Maria Callas: Letters and Memoirs	Maria Callas	Beacon Theatre	

== Discography ==
Year	Soundtrack	Song	Notes	Ref.
2002	Asterix & Obelix: Mission Cleopatra	"Ti amo"	Duet version	

== See also ==
- List of awards and nominations received by Monica Bellucci
