= List of awards and nominations received by Monica Bellucci =

Awards and nominations received by Italian actor Monica Bellucci

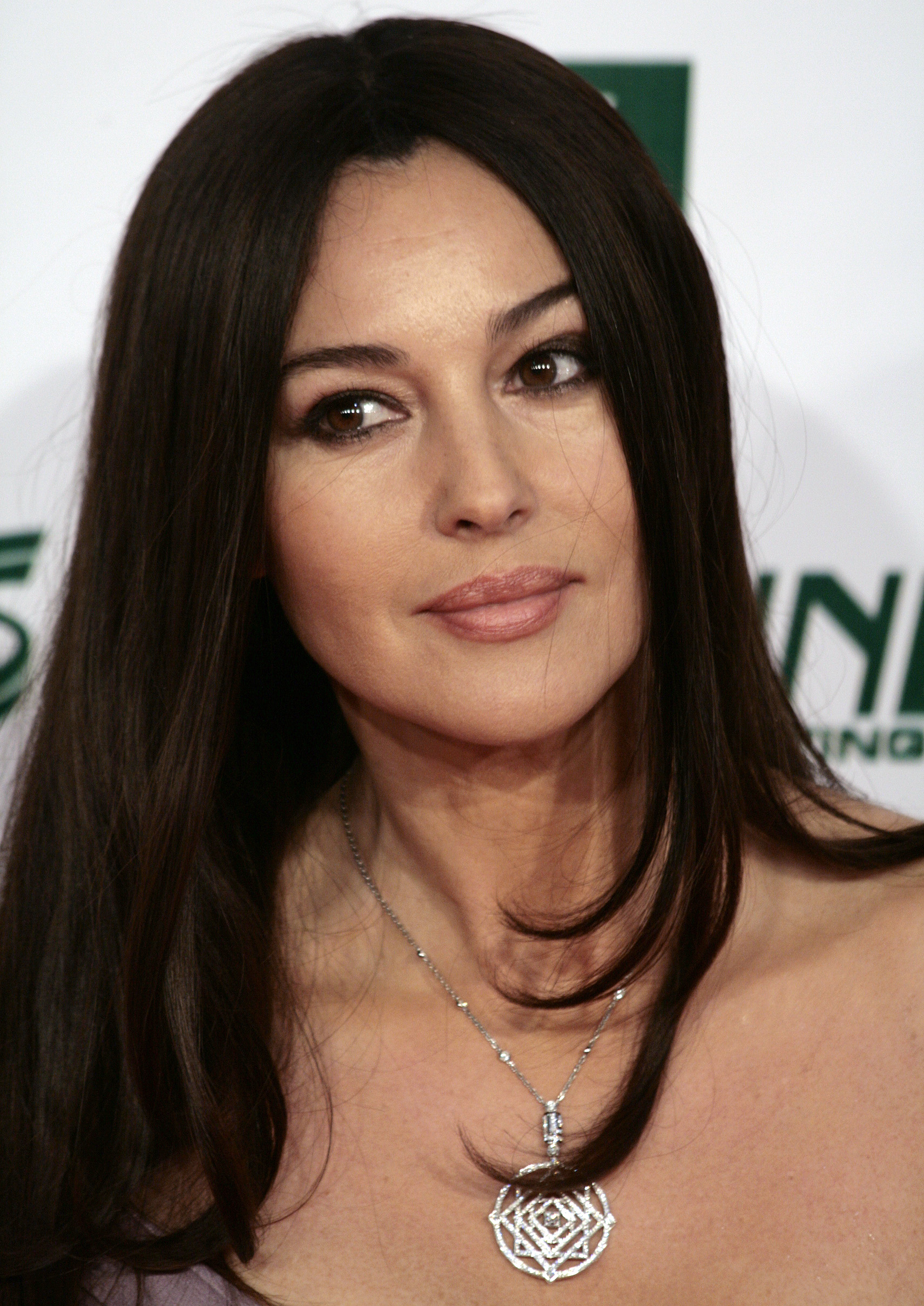
Bellucci at the 2009 Women's World Award

Monica Bellucci is an Italian actress. Her first credited television role was in the Italian miniseries Vita coi figli in 1991. In 1996, Bellucci starred in the French film The Apartment in a role that saw her nominated for the César Award for Most Promising Actress. In 1998, she won the Globo d'oro Award for Best Actress for her performance in L'ultimo capodanno. For her role of Sylvia in the 2001 film Brotherhood of the Wolf, she was nominated for Best Supporting Actress at the 28th Saturn Awards. In 2003, for her role as Alessia in the film Remember Me, My Love, Bellucci received a David di Donatello Award nomination for Best Supporting Actress and won the Nastro d'Argento Award in the same category. Bellucci received a Nastro d'Argento nomination for her portrayal of Mary Magdalene in the commercially successful American film The Passion of the Christ and another for her role as Baroness Emilia Speziali in Napoleon and Me. At the 2016 Dublin International Film Festival, the Canadian film Ville-Marie earned her the Best Actress Award from the Dublin Film Critics' Circle. In 2017, On the Milky Road earned her the Nastro d'Argento europeo (European Silver Ribbon Award) and the Russian Zolotoy Vityaz (Golden Knight) award for Best Actress in a Leading Role.

Bellucci received honorary awards from academic and other institutions. Mikhail Gorbachev presented her with a Women's World Award in 2009. In 2017, she received the Virna Lisi Prize, a lifetime achievement award in Rome. Bellucci was also awarded the Honorary Donostia Lifetime Achievement Award the same year. The French Lumières Academy gave her an Honorary Award in 2018, and she received an Honorary Magritte Award from the Belgian André Delvaux Academy in 2020. In 2021, Bellucci was given the David Special at the David di Donatello ceremony, a lifetime career achievement award from the Academy of Italian Cinema.

Bellucci also received honours from governments. In 2006, French Interior Minister Nicolas Sarkozy made her a knight of the Order of Arts and Letters. In 2010, Italian President Giorgio Napolitano awarded her the Vittorio De Sica medal at the Quirinal Palace. In 2016, French President François Hollande presented Bellucci with the knight insignia in the National Order of the Legion of Honour at the Élysée Palace. In 2020, Mayor Dario Nardella bestowed her with the Key to the City of Florence.

== Film ==
Awards and nominations for Bellucci's film work
Award	Year	Work	Category	Result	Ref.
César Awards	1997	The Apartment	Most Promising Actress	Nominated	
David di Donatello	2003	Remember Me, My Love	Best Supporting Actress	Nominated	
DIFF Awards – Dublin Film Critics' Circle selection	2016	Ville-Marie	Best Actress	Won	
European Film Awards	2001	Malèna	Jameson People's Choice Award for Best Actress	Nominated	
Globo d'oro	1998	L'ultimo capodanno	Best Actress	Won	
Locarno Film Festival	2026	Ketticè	Best Performance	Won	
MTV Movie & TV Awards	2004	The Matrix Reloaded	Best Kiss (with Keanu Reeves)	Nominated	
Nastro d'Argento	2003	Remember Me, My Love	Best Supporting Actress	Won	
Nastro d'Argento	2005	The Passion of the Christ	Best Supporting Actress	Nominated	
Nastro d'Argento	2007	Napoleon and Me	Best Supporting Actress	Nominated	
Nastro d'Argento	2017	On the Milky Road	European Silver Ribbon Award	Won	
Saturn Awards	2002	Brotherhood of the Wolf	Best Supporting Actress	Nominated	
Saturn Awards	2003	The Matrix Reloaded & The Matrix Revolutions	Cinescape Face of the Future Award – Female	Nominated	
Teen Choice Awards	2003	Tears of the Sun & The Matrix Reloaded	Choice Breakout Movie Actress	Nominated	
Zolotoy Vityaz (Golden Knight) Award (Note: The awards are presented annually at the Zolotoy Vityaz (Golden Knight) International Film Forum, a Slavic and Russian Orthodox film festival.)	2017	On the Milky Road	Best Actress in a Leading Role	Won	

== Theatre ==
Awards and nominations for Bellucci's stage work
Award	Year	Work	Category	Result	Ref.
Maria Callas Monaco Gala Awards (Note: The ceremony is held under the High Patronage of HSH Albert II, Prince of Monaco.)	2022	Maria Callas: Letters and Memoirs	Best Artist	Won	
Nastro d'Argento	2024	Maria Callas: Letters and Memoirs	Protagonist of the Year in Documentaries	Won	

== Special and academic honours ==
Special and academic honours received by Bellucci
Ceremony	Year	Award	Ref.
Globo d'oro	2005	European Golden Globe	
Women's World Award	2009	World Actress Award	
Taormina Film Fest	2011	Taormina Arte Award	
Ischia Global Film and Music Festival	2012	Ischia Award for Actor of the Year	
Küstendorf Film and Music Festival	2013	Films of the Future Award	
Ciak d'oro	2014	Superciak d'Oro Femminile Award (Career)	
Los Cabos International Film Festival	2016	Lifetime Achievement Award	
Cityfest – Cinema Foundation for Rome	2017	Virna Lisi Prize	
Monte-Carlo Film Festival of Comedy	2017	Career Achievement Award	
Mumbai International Film Festival	2017	Special Award	
San Sebastián International Film Festival	2017	Honorary Donostia Award for Career Achievement	
Trieste Film Festival	2017	Eastern Star Award	
Filming in Italy Festival – Los Angeles	2018	Career Achievement Award	
Filming in Italy Festival – Los Angeles	2018	IIC Los Angeles Creativity Award for Italian Excellence in the World	
Lumière Awards	2018	Honorary Lumière Award	
Chinese Business Club as part of International Women's Day	2020	Woman of the Year Award	
Magritte Awards	2020	Honorary Magritte Award	
David di Donatello	2021	David Special (Career David di Donatello Award)	
Flaiano Prizes	2021	International Flaiano Lifetime Achievement Award (Golden Pegasus)	
Torino Film Festival	2021	Lifetime Achievement Award	
Torino Film Festival	2021	Stella della Mole Award for Artistic Innovation	
Thessaloniki International Film Festival	2023	Honorary Golden Alexander	
Globo d'oro	2025	Lifetime Achievement Award	
Taormina Film Fest	2025	Special International Award	

== State honours ==
=== Decorations ===
Knight of the Order of Arts and Letters
In 2006, Bellucci was conferred with the knight of the Order of Arts and Letters by the Minister of the Interior, Nicolas Sarkozy, at his official residence on Place Beauvau.

Knight of the Legion of Honour
In 2016, she received the Legion of Honour from France's President François Hollande at the Élysée Palace.

=== Other honours ===
Name of country, year given, and name of honour
Country	Year	Honour	Ref.
Belgium	2019	Inducted into the Ostend's Walk of Fame	
Italy	2010	Vittorio De Sica medal for Italian cinema from President Giorgio Napolitano	
Italy	2020	Key to the City of Florence from Mayor Dario Nardella	

== See also ==
- List of Monica Bellucci performances
