= Diciannove =

2024 film by Giovanni Tortorici

- Italian theatrical release poster
- Directed by: Giovanni Tortorici
- Written by: Giovanni Tortorici
- Produced by: Aaron Brookner; Francesco Melzi; Alex Garcia; Luca Guadagnino; Marco Morabito; Gabriele Moratti; Paula Alvarez Vaccaro; Agustina Costa Varsi; Moreno Zani
- Starring: Manfredi Marini; Vittoria Planeta; Dana Giuliano; Zackari Delmas; Luca Lazzareschi; Sergio Benvenuto
- Cinematography: Massimiliano Kuveiller
- Edited by: Marco Costa
- Production companies: Frenesy Film Company; Pinball London
- Distributed by: Fandango (Italy)
- Release dates: 30 August 2024 (Venice); 27 February 2025 (Italy)
- Running time: 108 minutes
- Countries: Italy; United Kingdom
- Language: Italian
- Box office: $27,972

Diciannove (transl. Nineteen) is a 2024 coming-of-age drama film directed by Giovanni Tortorici in his feature directorial debut. Starring newcomer Manfredi Marini, it follows a restless 19-year-old student on his journey of self-discovery. It premiered at the 81st Venice International Film Festival on 30 August 2024, and received a theatrical release in Italy on 27 February 2025.

== Premise ==
Leonardo, a 19-year-old bisexual student, leaves his hometown of Palermo to study economics in London. Following tensions with his older sister and her roommate, Leonardo enrolls at the University of Siena to study literature before dropping out of school to study classics on his own; he also exhibits antisocial tendencies, rebuffing advances from his college peers and harboring strained relationships with his housemates. The following year, he travels to Turin to continue his journey of self-discovery.

== Cast ==
- Manfredi Marini as Leonardo Gravina
- Vittoria Planeta as Arianna Gravina, Leonardo's sister
- Dana Giuliano as Grazia, Arianna's roommate
- Zackari Delmas
- Luca Lazzareschi
- Sergio Benvenuto
- Maria Pia Ferlazzo as Leonardo's mother

== Production ==
The film is loosely autobiographical, with some elements taken directly from director Giovanni Tortorici's life. He stated:

I was born in Palermo, Sicily. When I was 18 I moved to England because, just like in the movie, I planned to study business. Then I changed my mind – again, just like the movie – and I went to Siena to study literature because I was very passionate about literature. . . . Then at a certain point, I started to think that I wanted to tell stories with cinema, with images. So I left the literature university and I went to a film school in Turin.

— Giovanni Tortorici

Tortorici met fellow Sicilian Luca Guadagnino while working as an assistant director on Guadagnino's 2020 miniseries We Are Who We Are. Tortorici later showed Guadagnino his script for Diciannove, and Guadagnino loved it so much that he offered to produce the film. Manfredi Marini, who plays Leonardo, was selected for the role via open castings.

The film was shot on 35 mm film. Principal photography took place in Siena, Palermo, Milan, and London in 2023. Tortorici's childhood home was also used as a filming location.

== Release ==
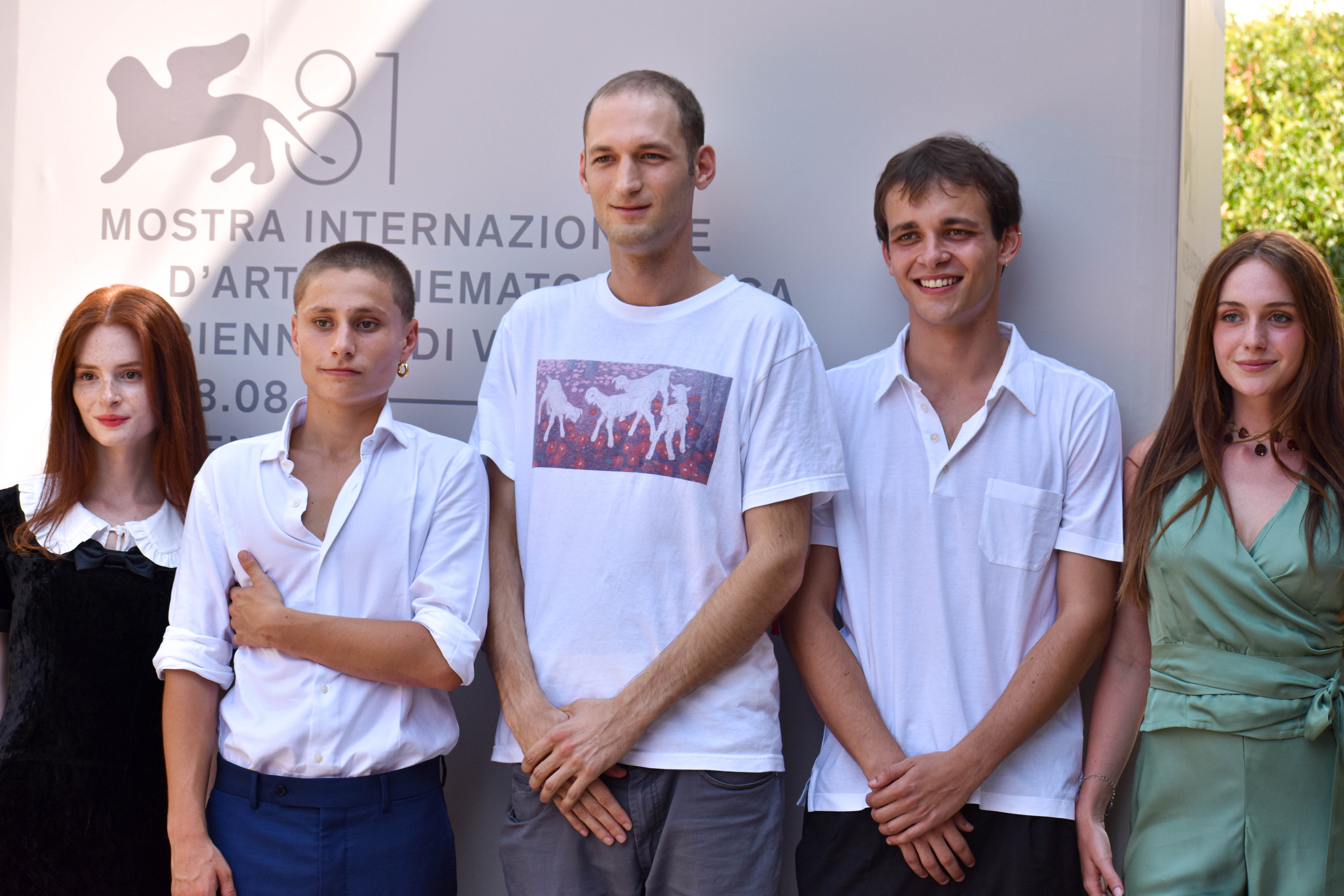
From left to right: Dana Giuliano, Zackari Delmas, Giovanni Tortorici, Manfredi Marini, and Vittoria Planeta at the 81st Venice International Film Festival

The film premiered at the 81st Venice International Film Festival on 30 August 2024 as part of the Orizzonti competition. That year, it was also screened at the Toronto International Film Festival and the MAMI Mumbai Film Festival.

The film received a theatrical release in Italy on 27 February 2025. The following month, Oscilloscope acquired the U.S. rights to the film.

== Reception ==
Kate Erbland of IndieWire gave the film a B+, writing, "Giovanni Tortorici's feature directorial debut is a creative shape-shifter, but once this Luca Guadagino-produced feature finally snaps into focus, it becomes something much more exciting."

Jordan Mintzer of The Hollywood Reporter wrote, "Diciannove is unflinchingly honest about what it's like to be 19, and, for the most part, totally lost. And Tortorici's insistence on capturing that feeling while avoiding the usual narrative tropes is what makes his film both fascinating and somewhat impenetrable." Guy Lodge of Variety called the film "a vivid, humane evocation of what it's like to be 19 years old, with the world at your feet and over your head".

Simone Emiliani of Mymovies.it gave the film three-and-a-half out of five stars, calling it a "bold and decidedly convincing debut where even its limitations make it even more electrifying". Lorenzo Ciofani of Cinematografo.it also gave the film three-and-a-half out of five stars, writing that "Giovanni Tortorici's first work is a disturbing seminar on the youth of a student who loves the literature of the past and does not know what to do in the present". Camillo De Marco of Cineuropa called the film "light-hearted, provocative, asyntactic".

Martina Barone of GQ Italia called the film "a courageous and arrogant debut" and wrote, "If the university years are the same ones in which one experiments the most, so with his debut feature film Giovanni Tortorici decides that it is right to try to be everything and its exact opposite, to have a well-defined character, but at the same time to be able to allow oneself to try, improvise and even make mistakes. Those who have never made a mistake at nineteen have never had the opportunity to grow up, so it is fun to watch a film so openly repulsive, so obsessively focused on not pleasing anyone...."

== Awards and nominations ==
| Award | Date of ceremony | Category | Result | Ref. |
|---|---|---|---|---|
| Venice Film Festival | 7 September 2024 | Orizzonti Award for Best Film | Nominated | |
