= Pinball London =

- Industry: Motion Pictures
- Founded: 2009
- Founder: Paula Vaccaro
- Headquarters: London, England.
- Products: Film production

Pinball London is a film production company based in London, England. The company works with auteur filmmakers including Emir Kusturica, Sally Potter, Guillermo Arriaga and Jim Jarmusch. Pinball was founded by producer Paula Vaccaro in 2009 and is often involved in international co-production. In 2011 the company released The Silver Goat directed by Aaron Brookner, the first film produced for iPad exhibition.

== Filmography ==
Year	Film title	Director	Notes
2016	On The Milky Road	Emir Kusturica	Co-Production with BN Films and Rasta International
2016	Uncle Howard	Aaron Brookner	Executive Produced by Jim Jarmusch
2014	Our Life (segment of Words with Gods)	Emir Kusturica	Co-Production with BN Films and Rasta International
2014	Burroughs: The Movie	Howard Brookner	Digital remaster produced by Pinball London
2014	Sumercé	Victoria Solano	
2012	Ginger & Rosa	Sally Potter	
2011	Mozzarella Stories	Edoardo De Angelis	Executive Produced by Emir Kusturica
2011	The Silver Goat	Aaron Brookner	The first feature film made for iPad exhibition
2007	Cocalero	Alejandro Landes	
