= Alex García (producer) =

Spanish producer (born 1966)

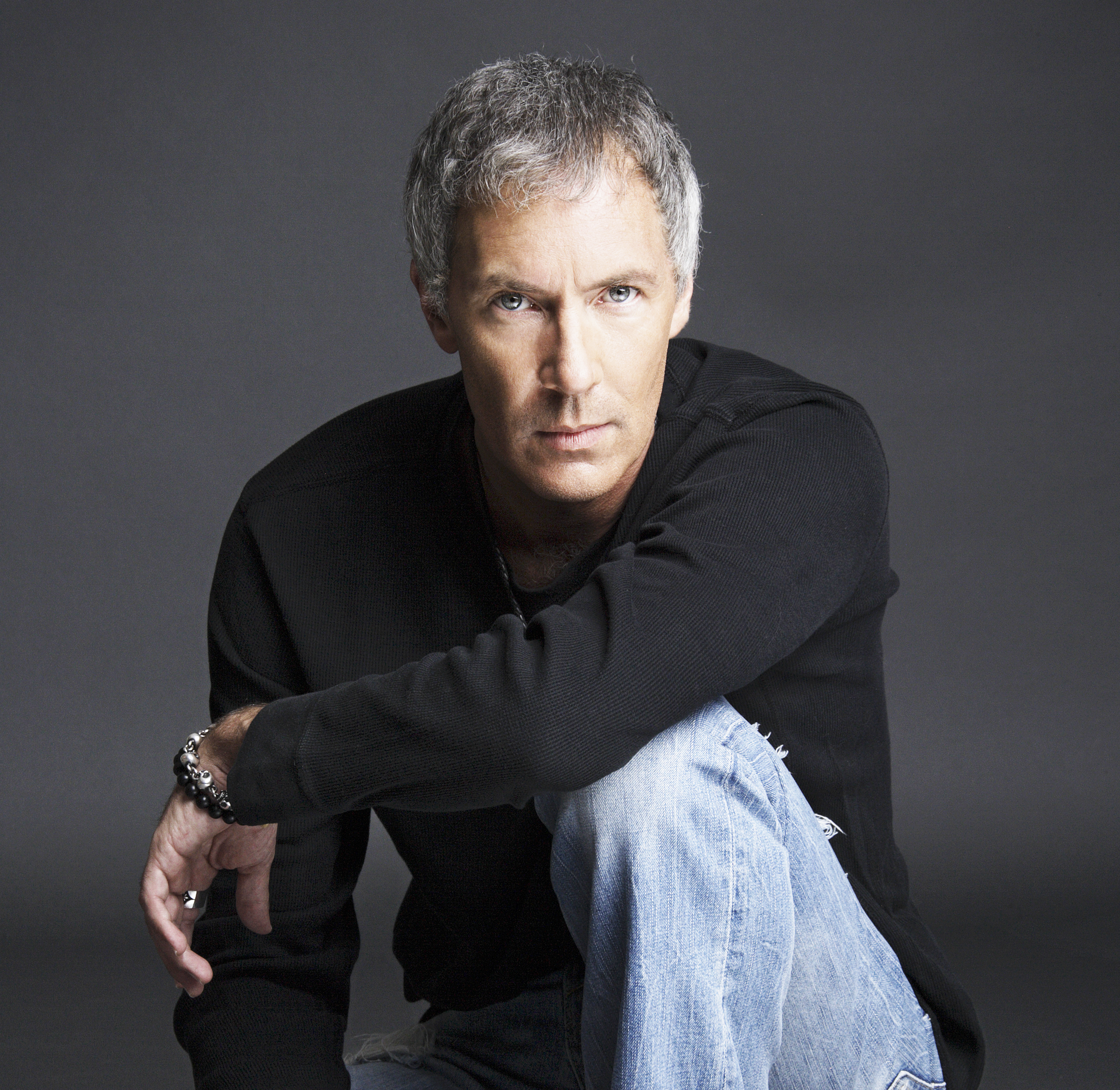
Alex García

Alejandro García Pérez (born 25 October 1966) is one of the most active producers of audiovisual content in the Spanish-speaking Americas. His films have won such prizes as the Golden Bear at the 2008 Berlin Film Festival for Elite Squad, along with a 2015 Emmy nomination for Outstanding Television Movie for the drama Nightingale.

== Early life ==
Alex García, born in Mexico City. He has a degree in business administration.

He started out professionally in finance and investments. He created an investment fund and acquired several businesses with the intention of restructuring their business plans and selling them. The first was the PanArte bakery, now a brand of processed foods dealing with several self-service chains.

The second was Ánima Estudios, a pioneer in the field of animation in Mexico. This company's first big project under García was the production of the animated series El Chavo del Ocho, based on the comedy of Roberto Gómez Bolaños.

== Career ==
García's films include; Matando Cabos, a modern Mexican film comedy that took in 62 million pesos during its first run in 2004; the horror film Kilometer 31, with an audience of more than 3 million viewers in Mexican theatres in 2007; and the Brazilian action film Elite Squad, which earned more than 30 festival prizes worldwide, including the Golden Bear at the 2008 Berlin International Film Festival.

The Colombian co-production The Snitch Cartel was Colombia's entry for Best Foreign Language Film at the 85th Academy Awards. No sé si cortarme las venas o dejármelas largas, the directorial debut by the Mexican director Manolo Caro, came in third at Mexican box offices in 2013. The drama Nightingale was nominated at the 67th Primetime Creative Arts Emmy Awards in the categories of Outstanding Television Movie and Outstanding Lead Actor in a Limited Series or Movie.

Since then he has ventured into the production of television series, including 13 Miedos, Paramédicos for Canal Once, and Sr. Ávila and Dios Inc., both for HBO. He has, in addition, produced music videos for artists such as Natalia Lafourcade, Jenny and the Mexicats, Enrique Iglesias, and Daddy Yankee.

His work as producer includes the documentary Carriere, 250 metros, by directors Natalia Gil and Juan Carlos Rulfo. This project, about the live of the Frenchman Jean Claude Carriere, well-known author, screenwriter, and playwright, who wrote many of the films directed by Spanish filmmaker Luis Buñuel, is listed as the most expensive documentary in the history of Mexican documentary films. Its production cost 14 million pesos.

In 2015, he released the full-length film Words with Gods, a compilation of several short films exploring the notion or concept of God among different cultures around the world. The original idea came from Mexican filmmaker Guillermo Arriaga, who directed one of the stories. Other participating directors include Alex de la Iglesia, Emir Kusturica, and Hideo Nakata. The project featured curation by Mario Varga Llosa and a score by Peter Gabriel.

García has also been involved in the production of television series. Among his projects are; Cronica de Castas, Sr. Avila and Dios Inc., both produced for HBO, Lucha Underground (4seasons) for El Rey Network, The First starting Sean Penn for Hulu, Leyend Quest (animation) currently in its third season for Netflix, Space Chicken from Space (animation) first season for Disney, Chapulin Colorado (animation) currently in the third season, El Chavo (animation) of which six seasons were released.

García was honored with Visionary Award (2016), from Hollywood Reporter and Winston & Baker for his contribution to the world of show business and his vision in creating international media ventures.

During 2018 and 2019, García has focused production around South America, mostly Colombia and Chile, were his company AG Studios Colombia has produced TV Series such as Ingobernable for Netflix, La Reina del Sur for Telemundo/Netflix and Jack Ryan for Paramount/Amazon and feature films for most studios in the US and Europe.

His partnership in AAA and Lucha Underground has brought him back to the live events world, something he did for a long time the beginning of his music business. His music ventures started as a promoter in Mexico and Latam, but changed in time, making his participation and companies, a big part of the reaggeton growth worldwide. Although his companies still produce, distribute and promote mostly reaggeton and urban-pop artists, he is now focused on finding a way to reinvent old Latin (salsa, son, merengue, cumbia, etc.) sounds.
