= Paula Vaccaro =

British-Italian film producer and scriptwriter

- Born: Paula Álvarez Vaccaro; 4 November 1973 (age 51)
- Occupation: Film producer

Paula Vaccaro is a British-Italian film producer, scriptwriter and journalist.

== Biography ==
Paula Vaccaro grew up in Argentina and has lived and worked in Spain, and, since 2000, the UK. As a producer she has worked in films involving international filmmakers such as Emir Kusturica, Guillermo Arriaga, Sara Driver, Jim Jarmusch, Oliver Stone, Sally Potter, Amos Gitai, Aaron Brookner, Edoardo De Angelis and Victoria Solano. She has produced documentaries and fiction films as well as TV documentaries and music videos. Before becoming a film producer, she was a journalist in her native Argentina.

== Filmography ==
As Producer

- Diciannove, directed by Giovanni Tortorici, 2024
- Sumercé, directed by Victoria Solano, 2019
- On the Milky Road, directed by Emir Kusturica, 2016
- Uncle Howard, directed by Aaron Brookner, 2016
- Words with Gods, segment Our Life directed by Emir Kusturica, 2014
- Burroughs, directed by Howard Brookner, 2014 remaster
- The Silver Goat, directed by Aaron Brookner, 2012

As Executive Producer

- Ginger & Rosa, directed by Sally Potter, 2012
- Mozzarella Stories, directed by Edoardo De Angelis, 2011

As Head of Production

- Maradona by Kusturica, directed by Emir Kusturica, 2008
