= Monica Bellucci =

Italian actress and model (born 1964)

- Bellucci in 2026
- Born: Monica Anna Maria Bellucci; 30 September 1964 (age 62); Città di Castello, Umbria, Italy
- Occupations: Actress; fashion model
- Years active: 1980–present
- Works: Full list
- Height: 5 ft 9 in (1.75 m)
- Spouses: Claudio Carlos Basso (m. 1990; div. 1994); Vincent Cassel (m. 1999; div. 2013)
- Partner: Tim Burton (2022–2025)
- Children: 2; including Deva Cassel
- Awards: Full list
- Website: monicabellucci.net

Monica Anna Maria Bellucci (Italian: [ˈmɔːnika belˈluttʃi]; born 30 September 1964) is an Italian actress who began her career as a fashion model before working in Italian, American, British, and French films. She has filmography in a range of genres and languages, and her accolades include the David di Donatello, Globo d'oro, Nastro d'Argento and nominations at Saturn Awards and César Awards. In 2018, Forbes Italy included her in their list of the 100 most successful Italian women.

Bellucci was represented by Elite Model Management and modelled for Dolce & Gabbana campaigns. She made her acting debut in the Italian television miniseries Vita coi figli (1991); she went on to play one of Dracula's brides in the horror film Bram Stoker's Dracula (1992) and then enrolled in acting classes. After appearing in Italian productions, she had her breakthrough role in The Apartment (1996), for which she received a César Award nomination for Most Promising Actress. Bellucci came to the attention of American audiences in Under Suspicion (2000) and gained greater international recognition as Malèna Scordia in Malèna (2000). Bellucci starred in the period horror Brotherhood of the Wolf (2001) and the comedy Asterix & Obelix: Mission Cleopatra (2002). She portrayed a rape victim in the controversial thriller Irréversible (2002), and Persephone in the 2003 science-fiction films The Matrix Reloaded and The Matrix Revolutions.

Bellucci was praised for her portrayal of Mary Magdalene in the drama The Passion of the Christ (2004). She played a prostitute in How Much Do You Love Me? (2005) and Shoot 'Em Up (2007), and acted in diverse roles in other films, including The Whistleblower (2010), The Ages of Love (2011), and The Wonders (2014). Her role in Ville-Marie (2015) earned her the Dublin Film Critics' Circle Award for Best Actress. At the age of 50, Bellucci appeared in the James Bond film Spectre (2015), becoming the oldest Bond girl in the history of the franchise. She later appeared in films such as On the Milky Road (2016), The Man Who Sold His Skin (2020), and Beetlejuice Beetlejuice (2024). On television, she has acted in Mozart in the Jungle (2016) and Call My Agent! (2018). She made her stage debut in 2019 as Maria Callas in Letters and Memoirs.

Bellucci starred alongside her second husband Vincent Cassel in on-screen partnerships that spanned ten years. She has remained involved in modelling, and worked as a brand ambassador for luxury brands such as Cartier and Dior. Described by several media outlets as a sex symbol, Bellucci received the knight insignias of the French Order of Arts and Letters in 2006 and of the French Legion of Honour in 2016. She represents Italy as a permanent member of the Academy of Motion Picture Arts and Sciences.

== Early life ==
Monica Anna Maria Bellucci was born in Città di Castello, Umbria, on 30 September 1964. Her father, Pasquale Bellucci, owned a trucking company, and her mother, Brunella Briganti, was a housewife and amateur painter. Bellucci was the only child in her family since her parents did not want another one. Bellucci grew up in Selci-Lama, in the comune (municipality) of San Giustino on the banks of the Tiber River. (Note: "Selci" and "Lama" are two toponyms together designating a frazione (hamlet) of San Giustino.)

Bellucci received a Catholic education. She was an "intelligent child". According to her father, she was discreet and increasingly interested in fashion, and grew up "surrounded by love". Bellucci was introduced to modelling at age 13 when she posed for a photographer friend-of-the-family in Città di Castello. She was distant from other children her age, regularly made detours to get home after school, and did not spend time with them in the comune's public space. Bellucci's father said she complained that everyone stared at her. Her father helped her gain self-confidence.

Bellucci developed a taste for cinema, watching films by Vittorio De Sica, Federico Fellini, Roberto Rossellini, Luchino Visconti, Marcel Carné, and Jean-Luc Godard. Bellucci has said her personality largely reflects her upbringing: "Certainly a lot of positivity also depends on the climate in which my parents raised me".

== Modeling career ==
=== 1980s and 1990s ===
At age 16, Bellucci was asked to pose for photography sessions by her father's friend, the director of a fashion agency. Having begun her modelling career, Bellucci periodically travelled to Milan and Paris while continuing her studies at Città di Castello. According to Bellucci: "I approached the adult universe very early" because she worked with models ten years older than herself. Bellucci said: "Modelling came to me naturally, and I loved pictures. I loved the world of image".

While hitchhiking, Bellucci met Piero Montanucci, a hairdresser from Città di Castello, who persuaded her to become his model. Bellucci, a student at the liceo classico, attracted attention wherever she went due to her striking appearance. She was considered a local model. Bellucci studied philosophy, literature, Latin and Greek. In 1983, Bellucci was dressed by Città di Castello-based fashion entrepreneur Pina Alberti and modelled at a fashion show at the Teatro degli Illuminati, the city's municipal theatre, as part of an event called Momento Donna, which Maria Giovanna Elmi hosted. Montanucci, her mentor at the time, accompanied Bellucci to the event. While in high school, Bellucci's father's friend allowed her to debut on the catwalk during a fashion show in Florence and at another in Milan.

Bellucci studied law at the University of Perugia, aiming to become a lawyer. She financed her studies by working as a model through her father's friend. After a friend of Bellucci encouraged her to apply to modelling agencies during her studies, she moved to Milan, one of Europe's fashion centres. Modelling agent Piero Piazzi saw Bellucci's arrival at the Elite Model Management agency and thought she could have been an actress. Piazzi had been critical in his assessment when he first saw Bellucci in 1987, telling her she was "not ready". Between 1988 and 1989, Elite signed Bellucci to a contract. In 1988, she featured on the cover of Elle France, photographed by Oliviero Toscani, and Vogue Spain.

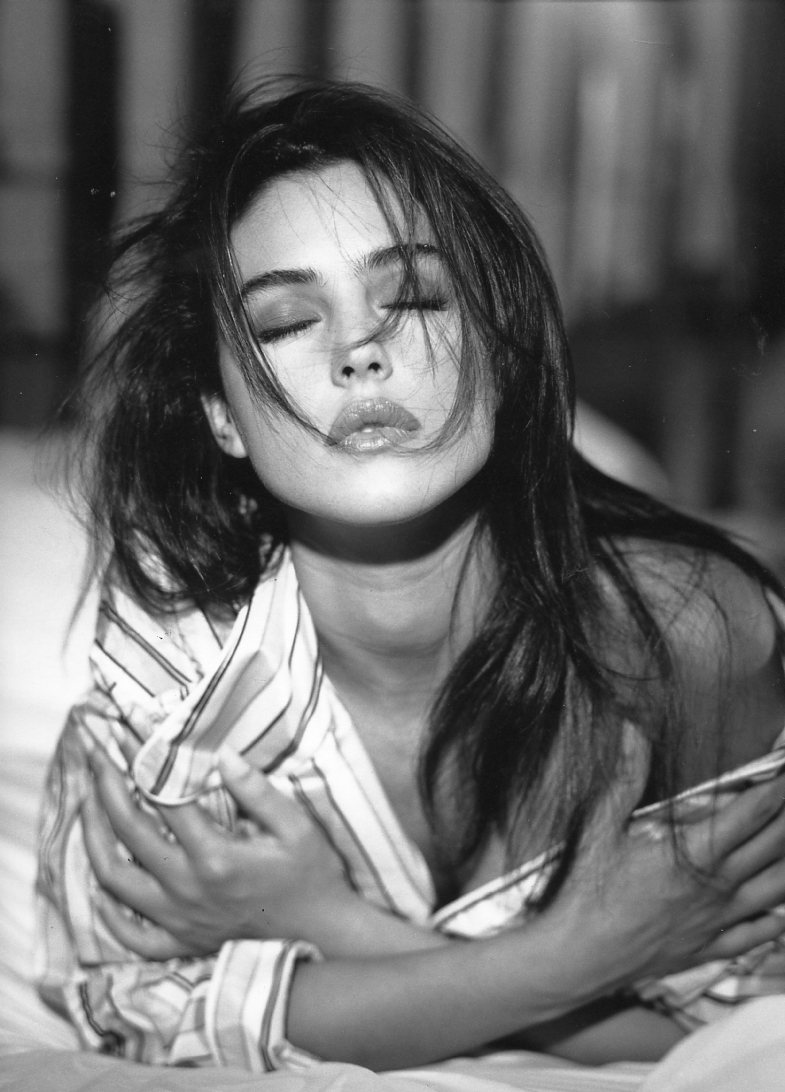
Bellucci at the Hôtel Raphael in Paris, March 1990

Bellucci's work as a model for Elite required her to travel, so she decided to leave university; she later said being a lawyer would not have suited her. She appeared in numerous international advertising campaigns, and Dolce & Gabbana recruited her as their muse. Bellucci's physical attributes aligned with the image the founders of Dolce & Gabbana wanted to portray. In 1989, Bellucci lived in New York and was already a millionaire. As a model, Bellucci was represented by Elite, and she worked in Milan, Paris, and New York.

In 1990, the French luxury house Dior used Bellucci's image and name for its Haute Couture line. She was photographed by Richard Avedon, and became the "protagonist" of Dolce & Gabbana's campaigns, "which elevated her to an icon of Mediterranean beauty". She also appeared in fashion parades for the luxury fashion house Fendi. In 1991, Bellucci was the brand ambassador for the cosmetics company L'Oréal. The same year, Bellucci appeared in the Sports Illustrated Swimsuit Issue, which featured photographs of her in the Caribbean. Bellucci also appeared in advertisements for Givenchy, Nina Ricci, Yves Saint Laurent, Versace and other luxury brands. In 1992, Bellucci combined her work as a model with her acting debut. In 1993, she first met Giuseppe Tornatore when he directed her in a television advertisement for Dolce & Gabbana perfume.

Bellucci opted to follow her passion for cinema, turned to acting and stopped modelling full-time, although she remained active in the industry. The Italian luxury company Breil appointed Bellucci its brand ambassador and she starred in advertising campaigns. In the 1990s, Bellucci regularly modelled for calendars, beginning in 1997 at the age of 33 when Avedon photographed her for the Pirelli Calendar. In 1997, Bellucci became the brand ambassador and muse of Cartier jewellery. Nina Hald of the Danish newspaper Berlingske said: "Cartier chose for the first time to associate an actress closely with the house". Cartier accompanied Bellucci throughout her acting career, notably on red carpets, where she wore haute joaillerie (high jewellery) collections, and she worked as a model for opulent creations. Italian fashion photographer Fabrizio Ferri photographed Bellucci for the magazine Max's calendar.

=== 2000s ===
Bellucci posed for the GQ calendar in 2000 and was photographed by Gian Paolo Barbieri. In 2004, while pregnant with her first child, Bellucci posed nude for the Italian cover of Vanity Fair in a protest against Italian laws that restricted access to in vitro fertilisation. That same year, Bellucci's status as the only actress who was contractually bound to Cartier was made public. In 2006, she was named brand ambassador for Dior and the face of a range of products until 2010. Cartier designed a collection of luxury diamond jewellery that was inspired by Bellucci and bore her name. It was first presented at a Cartier event in Dubai in 2007.

=== 2010s and 2020s ===
Bellucci's appearances in television advertisements include Martini Gold, a collaboration between Martini and Dolce & Gabbana, in 2010. She again posed semi-nude whilst pregnant for the cover of the April 2010 issue of Vanity Fair Italy. Cashmere goods manufacturer Éric Bompard appointed Bellucci as its brand ambassador for its winter 2011/2012 advertising campaign. In 2012, Bellucci was the face of an eponymous range of Dolce & Gabbana lipstick. She appeared in other seasonal fashion campaigns for Dolce & Gabbana. She was signed to Storm Management in London and D'Management Group in Milan.

Bellucci was chosen as the face of German cosmetics manufacturer Nivea for its 2018 and 2019 campaigns. In June 2018, Bellucci appeared in a fashion parade for Dolce & Gabbana when she opened the second day of Milan Fashion Week. According to Stefano Gabbana, Bellucci returned to the catwalk for the house for the first time since 1992. She also appeared on the catwalk for Dolce & Gabbana at the early 2019 Milan fashion week, along with Helena Christensen, Eva Herzigová, and Isabella Rossellini, who joined the influx of 1990s supermodels returning to the fashion spotlight.

Bellucci remained the "muse" and ambassador of the Cartier brand in the 2020s. Since 2000, Bellucci has appeared on national and international covers of Elle, GQ, (Note: In August 2015, Bellucci was featured on the cover of GQ Italy for the seventh time.) Harper's Bazaar, Marie Claire, Maxim, Paris Match, (Note: Bellucci first appeared on the cover of Paris Match in June 2001. She made her eighth cover in December 2012.) Schön!, The Sunday Times Style, Vanity Fair, and Vogue, among others.

== Acting career ==
=== 1990–1999: Early roles and breakthrough ===
In 1990, Italian director Carlo Vanzina noticed a photo of Monica Bellucci in a magazine and recommended her to Dino Risi, who was looking for a "new face" for his television miniseries Vita coi figli. Bellucci had never thought of becoming an actress and was surprised to be chosen for a role. (Note: In a March 1991 interview for L'Officiel Paris, she stated: "It happened in an accidental way. I was not expecting that at all. I was noticed by the producers of the film as a model. They came across photos of me that appeared in a magazine." To the question of whether she "never dreamed of one day being an actress?", she responded: "No. Being a model, working a lot, being in demand... were enough for me. As a child, I already dreamed of this: posing for fashion photos.") Bellucci made her acting debut in Vita coi figli, a two-part television film that was broadcast in Italy in May 1991, in which she played Elda. The same year, Bellucci made her film debut in La Riffa, which Francesco Laudadio directed.

In 1992, Bellucci played one of the three brides of Dracula in the horror film Bram Stoker's Dracula. Roman Coppola saw a photograph of Bellucci in the Italian magazine Zoom and implored his father Francis Ford to offer her a film role. Coppola arranged a meeting with Bellucci in Los Angeles while she was in New York for a photography session. After talking with Coppola, Bellucci realised she would embark on an acting career. At Coppola's request, Bellucci stayed in Los Angeles during filming; she was apprehensive about the city and believed her English needed improvement. She decided her next acting work would be in Italy. Bellucci's role as a "sensual vampire" was her international film debut.

Following her minor role in Bram Stoker's Dracula, Bellucci returned to Italy and enrolled in acting classes. According to Bellucci: "I craved it ... I needed to act". Bellucci said that a time when all of her friends were leaving the faculty was a challenging time. Bellucci had difficulty overcoming the prejudices related to her modelling and her physical appearance, and had to work to establish her credibility. For the next four years, Bellucci starred in Italian films but was ultimately dissatisfied due to the lack of opportunities, and she aspired to an international acting career. Bellucci appeared in the Emmy-winning biblical television miniseries Joseph (1995). In her view, the Italian film industry needed to invest more money to promote films internationally. Bellucci moved to France to improve her career prospects, and settled in Paris in 1995.

Bellucci's portrayal of Lisa in The Apartment (1996), a "moody" French film noir, earned her a César Award nomination for Most Promising Actress. This launched her career in France and strengthened her position as an actress. It was her first French-language film. Gavanndra Hodge of The Sunday Times stated that her "break-out role" was in the European arthouse film The Apartment. The BBC's Almar Haflidason described the film as "seductive" and "startling", giving it a rating of five stars. Bellucci's second French film was Jan Kounen's Dobermann (1997), in which she portrayed a mute Romani woman and had to learn sign language beforehand to embody her character. Recalling the filming process, she expressed an inclination for mise-en-scènes (stage settings) "that pass more through bodies than through words". At this point in her career, Bellucci made a significant impact on European audiences. Pierce Brosnan performed a screen test with Bellucci for the James Bond film Tomorrow Never Dies (1997) then requested she be given the role of Paris Carver but the studio stated only an American actress could be cast in the role. For her leading role as Giulia Giovannini in the Italian comedy-drama L'ultimo capodanno (1998), Bellucci received a Globo d'oro Award (Note: The Globo d'oro Awards are the Italian equivalent of the American Golden Globe. The Globo d'oro, the David di Donatello and the Nastro d'Argento are Italy's three most prestigious film awards.) for Best Actress. The Apartment later won a British Academy Film Award (BAFTA) for Best Film not in the English language, prompting film director Stephen Hopkins to take a close interest in Bellucci.

=== 2000–2003: American films, Malèna, and Irréversible ===
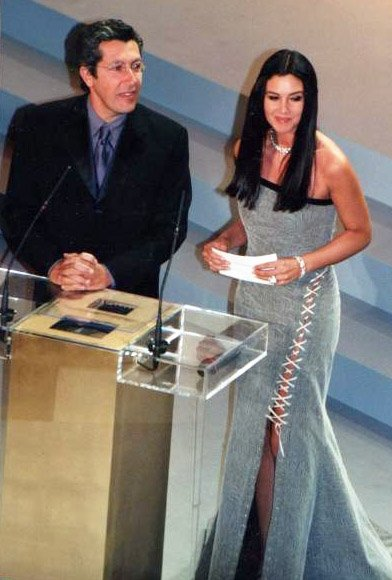
Bellucci and film director Alain Chabat at the 2001 César Awards

In 2000, Bellucci caught the attention of American audiences with her first English-language lead role in Hopkins' Under Suspicion, in which she starred opposite Morgan Freeman and Gene Hackman. Hopkins cast Bellucci after watching her performance in The Apartment and retained her ideas to create the character Chantal Hearst. Garth Pearce, writing in The Times, noted her improved spoken English. Under Suspicion was selected as one of the 2000 Cannes Film Festival's closing films, marking her red-carpet debut at the annual event. After the film's release, Freeman said: "It's all there in her eyes. She has this quality that reminds me of Jeanne Moreau. There is a sense of having been there, that she's had a life." Variety listed Bellucci among "the ten young actresses to keep an eye on".

Bellucci returned to Italian cinema, portraying Malèna Scordia, an enigmatic, envied and coveted World War II widow whose life unfolds before a 13-year-old boy in the Tornatore-directed film Malèna (2000), which is set in Sicily. Los Angeles Times film critic Kevin Thomas said the film emphasises the seductive appeal of the film's protagonist Scordia, to whom Bellucci gave an "heroic" portrayal that was delivered with a few lines of dialogue. Writing for The Guardian, Mark Salisbury considered Bellucci's portrayal in the Oscar-nominated film her "breakout performance". Malèna brought Bellucci worldwide attention; it was her first international success and caused her to be "besieged by offers" from Hollywood when Miramax secured the film for US distribution. For the US release, ten minutes of explicit, erotic scenes from the film were censored.

Bellucci starred with Samuel Le Bihan and Vincent Cassel in Christophe Gans' Brotherhood of the Wolf, a 2001 French period drama film that is based on historical events involving the beast of Gévaudan that decimated the population of Lozère in 18th-century France. The Washington Post film critic Stephen Hunter found the film's stylistic approach too dense, obscuring Bellucci's "fabulous natural asset"; she played an "underused" role as a courtesan–papist spy. The film received positive responses from other critics. Brotherhood of the Wolf was a box-office success in France, where it attracted five million viewers and grossed US$70 million worldwide, including $11 million in the US, against a budget of about €32 million. (Note: The average exchange rate of the US dollar to the euro was 0.99 in late January 2000 (US$0.99 bought €1).) The film earned Bellucci a Best Supporting Actress nomination at the 2002 Saturn Awards. The filming of Asterix & Obelix: Mission Cleopatra (2002), in which Bellucci starred with Jamel Debbouze, which, with its light-hearted, comic atmosphere, was one of Bellucci's favourite cinematographic experiences. She portrayed the "prickly" Cleopatra, the queen of Ancient Egypt, in the comedy film, which was directed by Alain Chabat. The Guardian film critic Peter Bradshaw wrote Bellucci was "certainly talented enough ... to merit getting the role of Cleopatra in some serious treatment", but before then, she had to perform in a "funny mainstream commercial" French production. The film was a success, selling 14 million tickets in France at the time of its release and grossing more than $128 million worldwide.

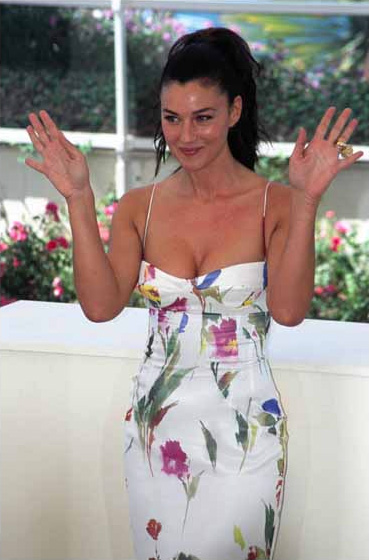
Bellucci at the 2002 Cannes Film Festival for the promotion of Irréversible

In 2002, Bellucci co-starred with Cassel in Gaspar Noé's "violent" arthouse thriller Irréversible. (Note: A confident Gaspar Noé had initially asked Vincent Cassel to star alongside Bellucci in a pornographic film. After listening to Noé's offer, "we told him there was no way we could do that", said Cassel. While discussing it with Noé, they diverted his intention in another direction and Irréversible emerged. "[Noé] is also very free, he doubts nothing", said Bellucci.) The revenge film, which was filmed on Super 16 film using hand-held cameras, depicts Bellucci playing Alex, who is graphically raped for nine uninterrupted minutes in an underpass, a scene Bellucci had to film four times. Bellucci's "indelible scene" was filmed on the outskirts of Paris, in an area frequented by prostitutes. Bellucci and Cassel, who at the time were in a relationship, were some of "the country's biggest talents". Audiences at the 2002 Cannes Film Festival were outraged during the midnight premiere of Irréversible, (Note: At the screening of Irréversible at the Cannes Film Festival on 24 May 2002, "visceral reactions from the audience" were reported: faintings, nervous breakdowns, 200 hasty departures, and people passing out in the lobby. Opinions differed; comments such as "an accomplished work" would burst forth from the crowd.) with some calling it "unsustainable". Lisa Nesselson of Variety said Bellucci showed "responses to peril and joy [that are] particularly memorable". The film has been studied in film schools. Noé said he "has never seen an actress so charismatic ... with that much guts ... her performance is incredibly audacious". K. Austin Collins of Rolling Stone called Irréversible "one of the most controversial movies ever".

In 2003, Bellucci played Alessia in the Italian film Remember Me, My Love, which was directed by Gabriele Muccino and earned Bellucci the Nastro d'Argento award for Best Supporting Actress. Bellucci co-starred with Bruce Willis in Antoine Fuqua's Tears of the Sun (2003), an action-adventure film that is set during a civil war in Nigeria. Bellucci played Doctor Lena Kendricks, who is working for a humanitarian organisation in a village that is threatened by rebels. Film critic David Denby of The New Yorker said some of Bellucci's scenes were exaggeratedly stylised but praised the film's visual prowess. Los Angeles Times film critic Kenneth Turan lauded Bellucci's "fierce" portrayal of Kendricks, who also had a "stereotypically fiery temperament". Tears of the Sun garnered mixed reviews from critics and was a box-office disappointment.

Bellucci successively portrayed the character Persephone in the two 2003 science fiction films The Matrix Reloaded and The Matrix Revolutions. She described her character as "dangerous, sensual with some sense of humor", recalling fond memories with Carrie-Anne Moss, Laurence Fishburne, and Keanu Reeves throughout the filming process in Australia. Film critic Andrew Sarris of The New York Observer gave The Matrix Reloaded a positive review, grossing $742.1 million worldwide against a budget of $150 million. Alongside its release, Bellucci appeared on the cover of Rolling Stone's Spanish edition. The Merovingian (Lambert Wilson) again accompanied Bellucci as her screen husband in The Matrix Revolutions, which received mixed reviews from critics. It grossed $427 million against a production and marketing budget of $185 million.

=== 2004–2007: The Passion of the Christ and career progression ===
In Rome, before filming Tears of the Sun, Bellucci was notified a Mel Gibson film about Jesus was in production and she asked to meet with him about the role of Mary Magdalene. Bellucci's agent advised her against appearing in this film due to its potential failure because its distribution was undetermined at the time. Bellucci ignored her agent's suggestion and rejected another film offer. Gibson chose Bellucci for the role because they "liked each other". She wanted to portray the character as "strong and deep" but no-one believed the film would succeed. Eventually, Bellucci played an expressive Mary Magdalene in Gibson's Christian drama The Passion of the Christ (2004), which depicts the final hours of the life of Jesus Christ. The film includes dialogue in Aramaic and Latin, languages Bellucci had to quickly learn. The New York Times film critic A. O. Scott said Bellucci was the only exception to the "absence of identifiable movie stars". Expressing a similar opinion, Le Monde said in the film portraying a fundamentalist view of the Gospel, Bellucci stands out from the cast list the most. According to film critic Paul Clinton, Bellucci "is excellent as Mary Magdalene". Catholics objected to Bellucci playing Magdalene. Film critic Roger Ebert described The Passion of the Christ as "the most violent film I have ever seen", adding he was "moved by the depth of feeling, by the skill of the actors" and gave a rating of four stars out of four. Overall, critics were divided in their responses to the film. The Passion of the Christ was a major commercial success with a worldwide gross of over $611 million against a budget of $30 million.

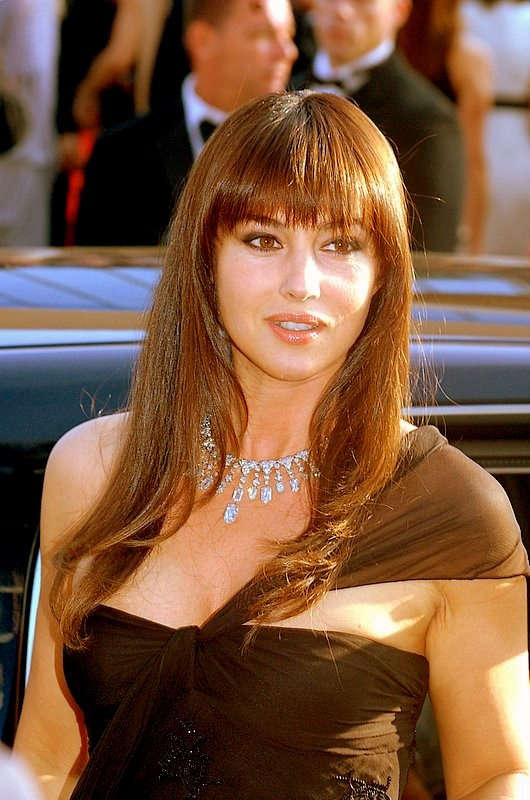
Bellucci at the 2006 Cannes Film Festival

On 2 July 2005, Bellucci was awarded the European Golden Globe for cinema at Rome's 45th Globo d'oro ceremony. She said she appreciated acting in both American and European films. In Terry Gilliam's fantasy adventure film The Brothers Grimm (2005), Bellucci played the 500-year-old Mirror Queen, starring opposite Matt Damon and Heath Ledger. Gilliam later said: "[i]mmediately she comes on-screen, it seems to me the whole film lifts up into another realm, a realm of sex and sensuality and danger". San Francisco Chronicle film critic Mick LaSalle said Bellucci convincingly portrayed her character, whose centuries-old age appeared to him to be discordant with her "allure". She also voiced Cappy for the French version of the 2005 animated film Robots. Bellucci had a leading role in Bertrand Blier's French romantic comedy How Much Do You Love Me?, which also starred Gérard Depardieu. Bellucci portrayed Daniela, the most beautiful prostitute in Pigalle, Paris, whom a lottery-winning office worker offers to pay to live with him. A journalist at Le Monde called the film "a hymn to the beauty of Monica Bellucci", and said it is neither Blier's best film nor his most failed. Nesselson commented Bellucci was optimally used in the film because she stimulates the viewer's senses and intellect.

In 2006, Bellucci starred alongside Daniel Auteuil in Paolo Virzì's period comedy-drama Napoleon and Me as baroness Emilia, who has a turbulent relationship Martino (Elio Germano). The film depicts Napoleon Bonaparte during his exile to Elba from 1814 to 1815. Author Mark Feeney said Bellucci does not take "things too seriously" in the film. Bellucci said she declined to play a role in the blockbuster 300 and instead appeared in the film d'auteur (auteur film) The Stone Council. Bellucci was cast after the initial announcement of Sophie Marceau for the lead role in the thriller. The Stone Council was adapted from the eponymous novel by Jean-Christophe Grangé. The film differs by character names; the book's female hero is called Diane Thiberge, whereas Bellucci starred as Laura Siprien, a tormented adoptive mother who is confronted by killers who want to steal her child. Sébastien Le Fol of Le Figaro wrote that she "delivers one of her best performances on the big screen" with a muted sex appeal. Bellucci's hair was cut short for the film, a preferred style of French cinema hairstylist John Nollet, who also styled Bellucci on the sets of Brotherhood of the Wolf and Asterix & Obelix: Mission Cleopatra.

Bellucci starred opposite Paul Giamatti and Clive Owen in Michael Davis' action thriller Shoot 'Em Up, which was released in the US in September 2007. Bellucci portrayed Donna Quintano, who teams up with Owen's character Mr Smith to protect a baby during a bloody fight. Bellucci's character is another prostitute with a different approach than that of her character in How Much Do You Love Me?; Bellucci said she felt empathy for female sex workers, who she believes retain "faith in humanity". She was fond of this sort of paradox and tried to highlight this virtue in her portrayals of characters of all types but noted she could explore the opposite spectrum. Richard James Havis of the South China Morning Post wrote: "It's the latest in a slew of extreme roles". Bellucci dubbed her own voice for the French and Italian releases of Shoot 'Em Up, saying it was a frequent practice for her to accomplish each film three times.

Bellucci continued to work in French film productions and starred alongside Auteuil in Alain Corneau's The Second Wind, a remake of the critically acclaimed Jean-Pierre Melville's 1966 gangster film of the same title. Bellucci portrayed Manouche, a tenacious character who has affection for an escaped convicted gangster. Bellucci had the idea of dyeing her hair blonde to adhere to the style of female film noir characters of the 1950s and 1960s. Thierry Jousse, a critic for Libération, wrote Bellucci was alone in a "fatally virile" context but she got through it "to the point of becoming the spectator's compass and the flesh of a film that sometimes lacks it". In November 2007, Le Monde reported on the commercial failures of The Second Wind and The Stone Council.

=== 2008–2017: Continued international work ===
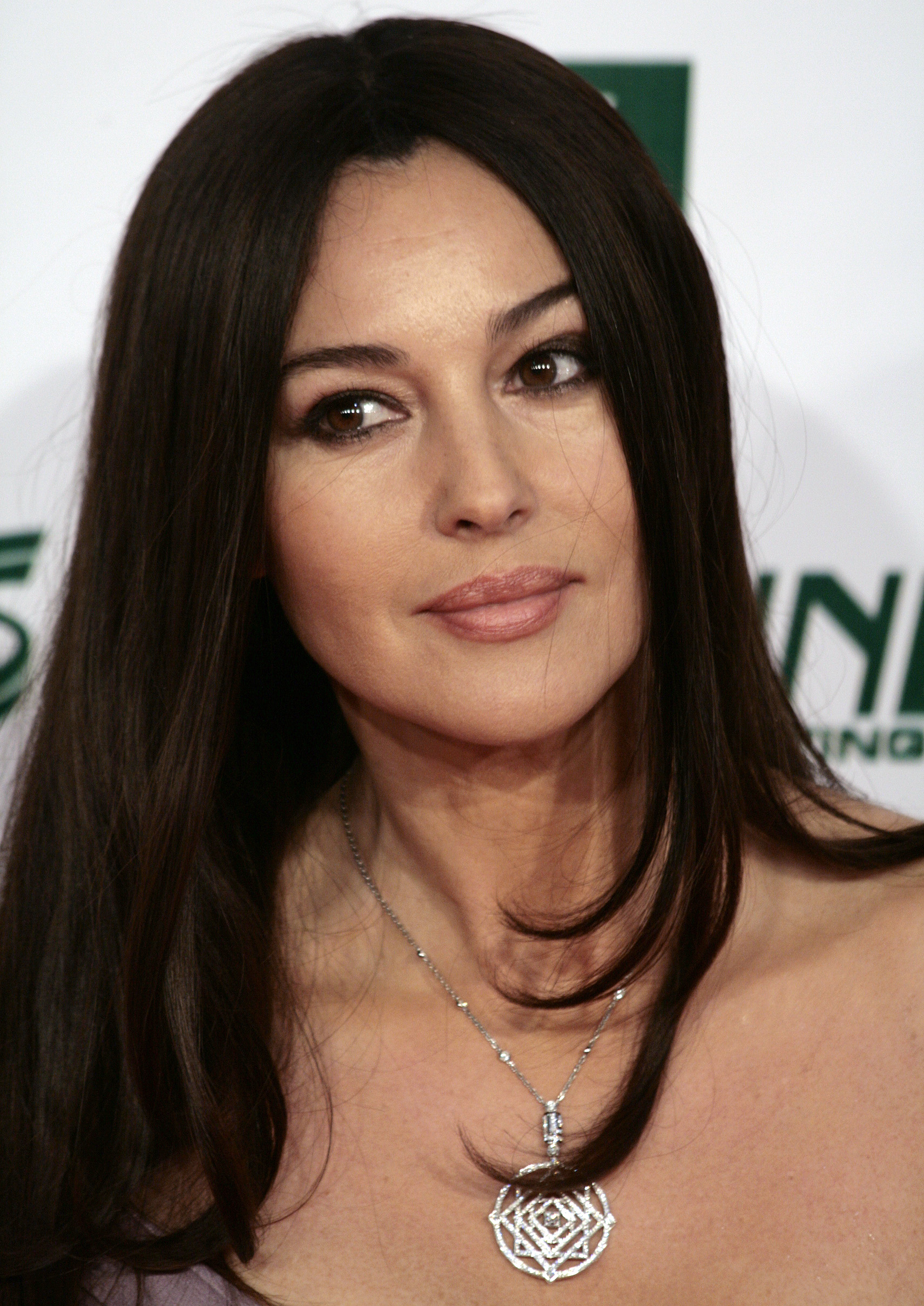
Bellucci at the Women's World Award in 2009

Bellucci felt a "visceral" need to act in Italian films regularly. In 2008, she co-starred in Marco Tullio Giordana's Wild Blood with Luca Zingaretti. The historical panorama examines the fate of Luisa Ferida (Bellucci) and Osvaldo Valenti (Zingaretti), leading actors during the Italian fascism period. Author Barry Forshaw called Bellucci "charismatic" and author Gino Moliterno praised her performance as "extremely powerful". Next, Bellucci played Alba in the Italian film The Man Who Loves, where she was enamoured with Pierfrancesco Favino's character Roberto through a cinematic flashback.

On 5 March 2009, Bellucci received a World Actress Award at the Women's World Award in Vienna. The same year, Bellucci co-starred with Marceau in the thriller Don't Look Back, a sequel to In My Skin, both of which were directed by Marina de Van. The film depicts Marceau's character seeing changes around her and noticing her body transform into Bellucci's. J.B. Morain of Les Inrockuptibles said Bellucci's physical attitude and "attention to others have never been so well filmed". Variety's Derek Elley said Bellucci "looks elegant and mystified", although both film critics noted the clumsily written dialogue. Bellucci reunited with Reeves in Rebecca Miller's romantic comedy-drama The Private Lives of Pippa Lee (2009), which co-stars Winona Ryder and Robin Wright. Bellucci portrayed Gigi Lee, the former wife of a successful publisher Herb (Alan Arkin). She next appeared in a cameo role in Tornatore's autobiographical film Baarìa, a family saga traversing several generations that was filmed in Bagheria, Sicily.

In 2010, Bellucci portrayed Laura Leviani in Larysa Kondracki's biopic drama thriller The Whistleblower, which was primarily filmed in Romania and depicts a vast human trafficking network that was discovered in post-war Bosnia and Herzegovina in 1999. Hélène Delye of Le Monde described Bellucci's character as a "grizzled, stubborn, insensitive civil servant". The Whistleblower received a mixed critical reception. Bellucci made three films in seven months; these were Giovanni Veronesi's The Ages of Love, Philippe Garrel's A Burning Hot Summer, and Bahman Ghobadi's Rhino Season. In the third segment of the comedy anthology film The Ages of Love (2011), Bellucci starred opposite Robert De Niro, who played a divorced American art-history professor living in Rome who falls in love with Bellucci's character Viola. De Niro was delighted to work with Bellucci, saying she had "worked her magic" on him and that he had accepted the role because he wanted to act alongside her. It was filmed two months after the birth of Bellucci's second child. An improvised scene shows De Niro performing a striptease in front of Bellucci, which echoes in reverse a sequence in the 1963 film Yesterday, Today and Tomorrow, in which Sophia Loren stripteased for Marcello Mastroianni. For her role in Rhino Season (2012), Bellucci learnt to speak Persian. Journalist Helen Barlow of SBS Australia said Bellucci "brought her natural poise and grace" to the character and "surprises with a stoic minimalist performance".

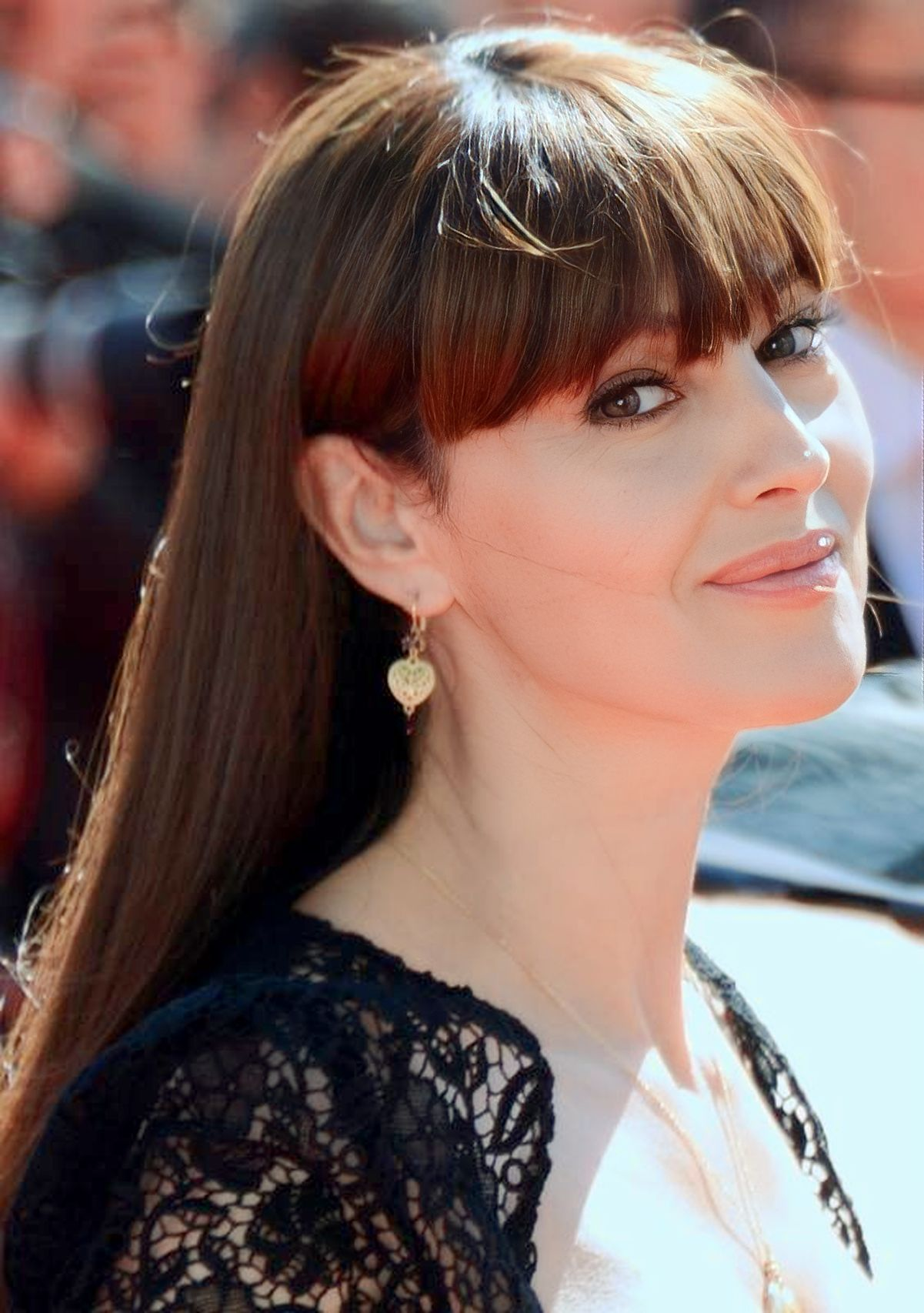
Bellucci at the 2014 Cannes Film Festival

In 2014, Bellucci appeared in Alice Rohrwacher's The Wonders as Milly Catena, host of a televised contest. In the film, which combines autobiographical aspects with fiction, Bellucci's character is depicted as a Pagan priestess wearing elaborate clothes and surrounded with ancient figures. The Wonders was critically acclaimed and won the Grand Prix Award at the 2014 Cannes Film Festival. In 2015, Bellucci starred as Sophie Bernard in the Canadian drama film Ville-Marie, which was directed by Guy Édoin. The film traces the journey of Bernard, a European actress visiting Montreal for a film shoot and trying to reconcile with her son. Bellucci stated Édoin had offered her "one of the most beautiful roles" of her career and described a stimulating fear of embodying Bernard's character that emotionally affected her. The film garnered generally positive reviews and Bellucci's performance was unanimously praised. For her portrayal of Bernard, Bellucci received the Best Actress Award from the Dublin Film Critics' Circle at Dublin International Film Festival.

At 50, Bellucci became the oldest Bond girl at that time in the James Bond film franchise, playing Lucia Sciarra in Sam Mendes' Spectre (2015). Bellucci was initially sceptical about Mendes' project, but he argued that casting a mature woman in a James Bond film would be innovative. Bellucci felt gratified to have been the first to portray a role she defined as a "James Bond lady". Spectre was released to mixed reviews from critics though the British press responded more positively. The film grossed $880 million worldwide against a $250–300 million production budget. Guy Lodge of Variety called Bellucci "[o]ne of the most restlessly globe-trotting stars in world cinema" who does not want national borders or age brackets to dictate her filmography. In 2016, Bellucci had a guest role in the third season of the American comedy-drama streaming television series Mozart in the Jungle, an adaptation of Blair Tindall's memoir Mozart in the Jungle: Sex, Drugs, and Classical Music, portraying Alessandra, an opera singer and latest collaborator of New York symphony orchestra conductor] Rodrigo (Gael García Bernal). Variety's Nick Vivarelli called Bellucci the "Italian actress with international star power".

Bellucci portrayed Nevesta in the film On the Milky Road (2016), a romance that is set during the 1990s Bosnian War and whose lead role was played by the film's director Emir Kusturica. She said, "I decided to be an actress, not a politician. I recount political choices through my artistic choices." Kusturica asked her to learn her dialogue in Serbian. She had to adapt to challenging production conditions in a "land of beauty and violence", and Kusturica suffered "great [mental] pain" during filming, which spanned four summers. The Hollywood Reporter writer Neil Young said the Golden Lion-nominated film's approach lacked nuance, but that Bellucci performed "admirably well" and kept her "dignity intact" in a physically demanding role. Her performance in the film earned her the Nastro d'Argento europeo (European Silver Ribbon Award), which was held on 1 July 2017 at the ancient theatre of Taormina in Sicily.

In 2017, Bellucci appeared in the 14th episode of the third season of Twin Peaks, playing a fictional version of herself in a dream experienced by FBI Deputy Director Gordon Cole (David Lynch) in which she dines with him in Paris and gives him cryptic information that he believes may help him solve a case. Though the episode's official title is "Part 14", the third season's Blu-ray release titled it "We Are Like the Dreamer", a line spoken by Bellucci. Also in 2017, she received the honorary Donostia Award at the San Sebastián International Film Festival.

=== 2018–present: Recent career ===
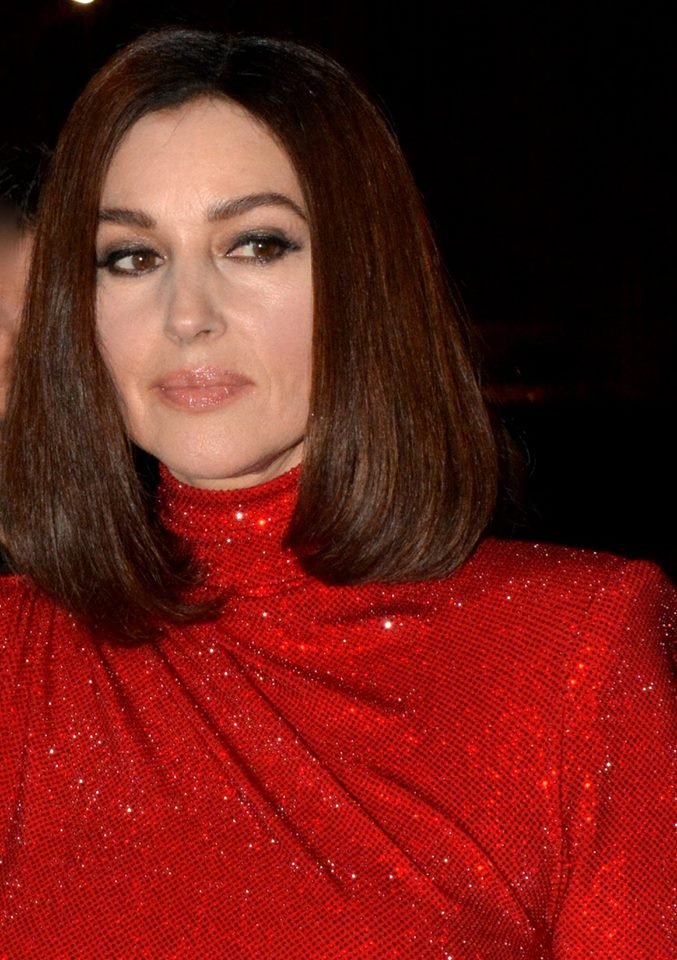
Bellucci in 2018

In 2018, Bellucci had a leading role in the Australian comedy science-fiction horror film Nekrotronic, playing a necromancer and demonic soul-eater. In his appraisal of the film, Stephen Dalton of The Hollywood Reporter said Bellucci portrayed her "diva" character through an "operatic camp-vamp" performance but that her acting style would be best suited to films by Tim Burton and Guillermo del Toro. Also in 2018, Bellucci appeared in the third season of the France 2 comedy television series Dix pour cent (Ten Per cent), playing herself with self-mockery. The well-received show was initially renamed Call My Agent! after its Netflix purchase. In Claude Lelouch's film The Best Years of a Life (2019), which is set in Normandy, Bellucci had a cameo role as Elena, the daughter of Jean-Louis Duroc (Jean-Louis Trintignant). The film garnered positive critical responses.

Following his documentary film Maria by Callas (2017), writer and director Tom Volf proposed to Bellucci his project based on his book Maria Callas: Lettres & Mémoires, which includes the writings of opera singer Maria Callas. Following the film, Bellucci made her theatrical debut at the Marigny Theatre in Paris held from 27 November to 6 December 2019 in Maria Callas: Letters and Memoirs, a one-woman show Volf directed. In the show, Bellucci recited letters alone on stage and wore two dresses that had belonged to Callas. Bellucci has intermittently performed the show over a number of years. Maria Callas: Letters and Memoirs visited European theatres, including Venice's Teatro Goldoni and Athens's Odeon of Herodes Atticus, with an orchestra that attracted 4,000 people each night. In 2020, Bellucci starred as Soraya in the Oscar-nominated film The Man Who Sold His Skin, which Kaouther Ben Hania directed. Time film critic Stephanie Zacharek said Soraya, a "frosty, willowy blond", is acted by "a deviously silky-smooth Monica Bellucci".

In 2021, at the 66th David di Donatello ceremony, Bellucci received a David Special Award for her career achievements. She co-starred as part of an ensemble cast including Liam Neeson and Guy Pearce in Martin Campbell's action thriller Memory (2022), in which she played Davana Sealman, an unscrupulous real-estate magnate. She was initially interested in the duality of the antagonist's persona she would play and wanted to avoid typecasting based on her physical appearance, which she had experienced in the past. According to Entertainment Weekly critic Leah Greenblatt Memory is "wrapped in leaden dialogue and B-movie cliché" and Bellucci appears "blasé". In 2022, Bellucci performed Maria Callas: Letters and Memoirs at Her Majesty's Theatre in London, Chatelet Theatre in Paris, and at venues in Istanbul and Los Angeles.

In January 2023, at 58, Bellucci performed the play at the Beacon Theatre in New York City. In 2023, recalling Irréversible, Bellucci told The New York Times her "days of acting in transgressive movies are behind her" because she is a mother. In 2023, Bellucci entered talks to star in Beetlejuice Beetlejuice as Delores, Betelgeuse's ex-wife and the movie's villain. She won the Nastro d'Argento Award for Protagonist of the Year in Documentaries 2024 for her interpretation of Callas in Letters and Memoirs.

In 2026, Bellucci starred in the Italian coming-of-age drama film Ketticè, written and directed by Giovanni Tortorici and produced by Luca Guadagnino. She played a supporting role as the mother of the lead character, Giulio (Salvatore Gallina). Her character is a quasi-caricatured, elegant yet eccentric and slightly violent aristocratic matron navigating a bourgeois social role. The film had its world premiere in the main competition at the 79th Locarno Film Festival on August 8, 2026, where Bellucci's performance was highlighted by critics for its sense of irony and project of a "self-aware drama queen". The film was released for nationwide theatrical distribution in Italy on September 3, 2026, by Piper Film.

== Other activities ==
=== Film industries ===
Bellucci was mistress of ceremonies at the 56th Cannes Film Festival, presiding over the opening and closing ceremonies that were held on the Promenade de la Croisette from 14 to 25 May 2003. From 17 to 28 May 2006, she was a jury member at the 59th Cannes Film Festival. In 2009, alongside filmmakers from Europe and the US, and 70 other industry names, Bellucci signed a petition to support film director Roman Polanski, who had been arrested in connection with his 1977 sexual abuse charges while on his way to Zurich Film Festival. Bellucci was also master of ceremonies at the 70th Cannes Film Festival, which took place from 17 to 28 May, where she was in charge of opening and closing one of the major international film events.

In 2017, the Academy of Motion Picture Arts and Sciences invited Bellucci to become a permanent member representing Italy, becoming one of the voting jurors who award the annual Academy Awards (Oscars). From 26 to 30 September 2018, Bellucci chaired the judging panel of the 29th Dinard British Film Festival. Bellucci was due to be chairwoman of the 15th Crystal Globe Awards, which was scheduled for 14 March 2020 at the Wagram auditorium in Paris, but the ceremony was cancelled due to the COVID-19 pandemic.

=== Charities and patronages ===
In 2008, Bellucci supported a fundraising campaign for a centre for children with cancer located in Prima Porta, Italy. The campaign was initiated by the Associazione Genitori Oncologia Pediatrica (AGOP) (Association of Parents in Pediatric Oncology). In 2010, Bellucci became patron of Paroles de Femmes (Words of Women), an apolitical, secular French association promoting equality between men and women in society. In March 2010, she organised the Nuit des Femmes (Women's Night), an assemblage of female politicians, researchers, doctors, lawyers, writers, painters, and business leaders, to assess the progression of women's rights in France. The funds raised went towards the building of centres of accommodation, reintegration and support for single mothers in precarious situations. In 2010, Rizzoli and La Martinière Groupe published a book prefaced by Tornatore that described Bellucci's modelling and acting careers through photographs taken by Peter Lindbergh and Helmut Newton. All proceeds from the book's sales were donated to AGOP and Words of Women. She donated €10,000 to the City of Cannes to fund a solidarity campaign to support recovery efforts following the deadly floods of October 2015 in the Alpes-Maritimes region. Bellucci is also a patron of the association SOS Autism France.

=== Foreign relations of Italy ===
According to Corriere della Sera's Stefano Montefiori, Bellucci is regarded as a sort of ambassador of Italy to the French population. She has been involved in state dinners chaired by the President of France and organised as part of visits by foreign heads of state. On 21 November 2012, Bellucci attended a state dinner French President François Hollande hosted at the Elysée Palace in Paris during the visit of President of Italy Giorgio Napolitano and his ministers. On 5 July 2021, Bellucci was invited to a state dinner hosted by French President Emmanuel Macron at the Elysée Palace in honour of Italian President Sergio Mattarella and his daughter Laura. (Note: Other participants included French ministers, LVMH Moët Hennessy Louis Vuitton's co-founder, chairman and CEO Bernard Arnault, Dior's creative director Maria Grazia Chiuri, Kering's chairman and CEO François-Henri Pinault, and French actress Carole Bouquet.)

== Public image ==
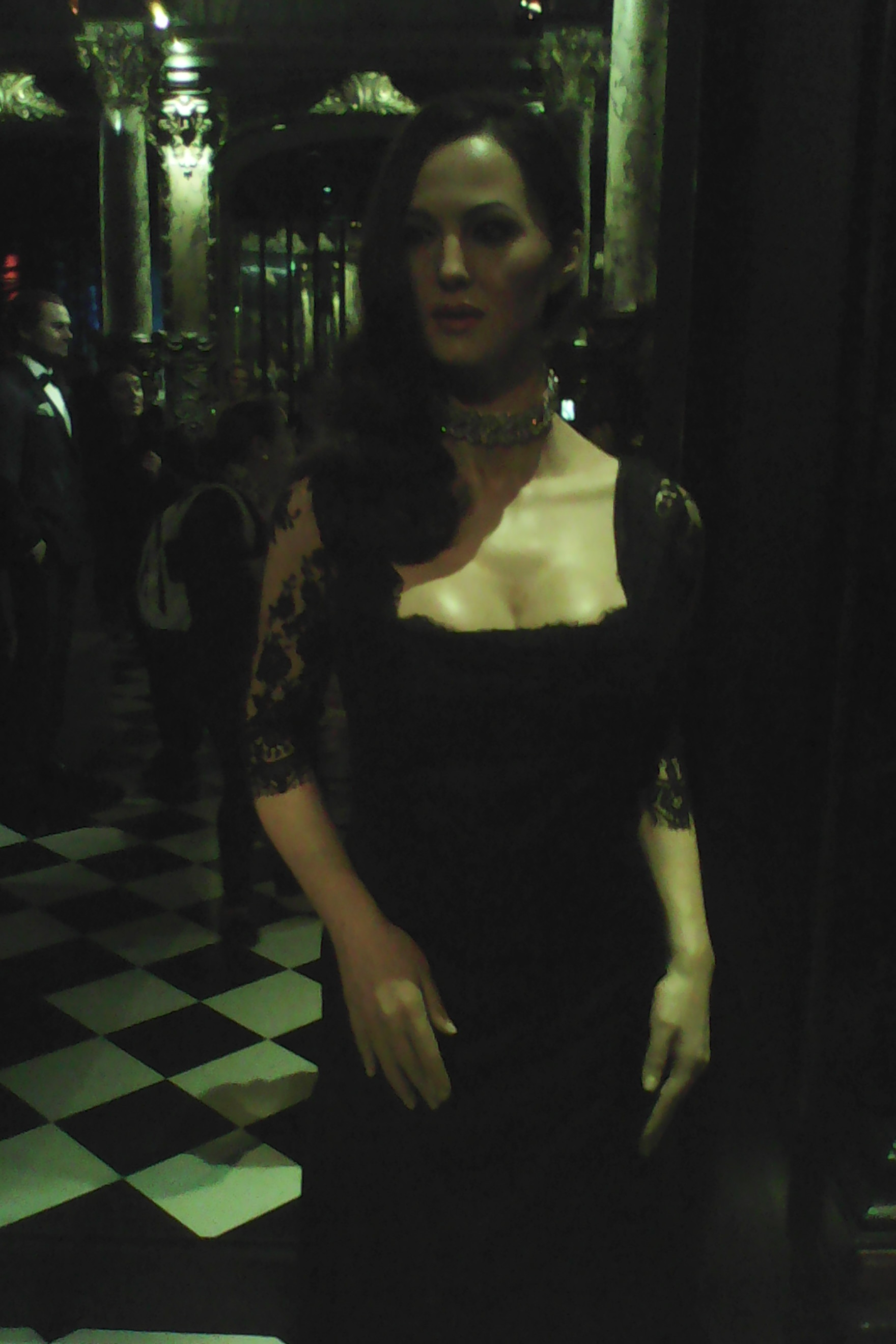
Bellucci's wax figure at Grévin Museum, Paris

On 23 November 2004, Bellucci pressed the button triggering the Christmas illuminations on the Champs-Élysées avenue that consisted of 45 km (28 mi) of electric garlands descending from the Place de l'Étoile towards Place de la Concorde, in the presence of the First Deputy Mayor Anne Hidalgo. Bellucci was the first-ever foreign public figure invited by the City of Paris and the Champs-Élysées Committee (Note: The association, founded in 1916, represents retailers on the Champs-Élysées avenue and includes 180 commercial companies.) to inaugurate this annual celebration. In April 2005, the Grévin Museum in Paris unveiled a wax statue of Bellucci. According to Blier, Bellucci is "completely relaxed with her image and with her own sense of modesty as well"; Blier compared her to Ava Gardner and "the stars of yesteryear". On 9 May 2008, L'Obs reported on a survey of 1,003 people conducted by the Superior Audiovisual Council as part of Europe Day, where Bellucci was the second-most-popular European personality (excluding France) of the French.

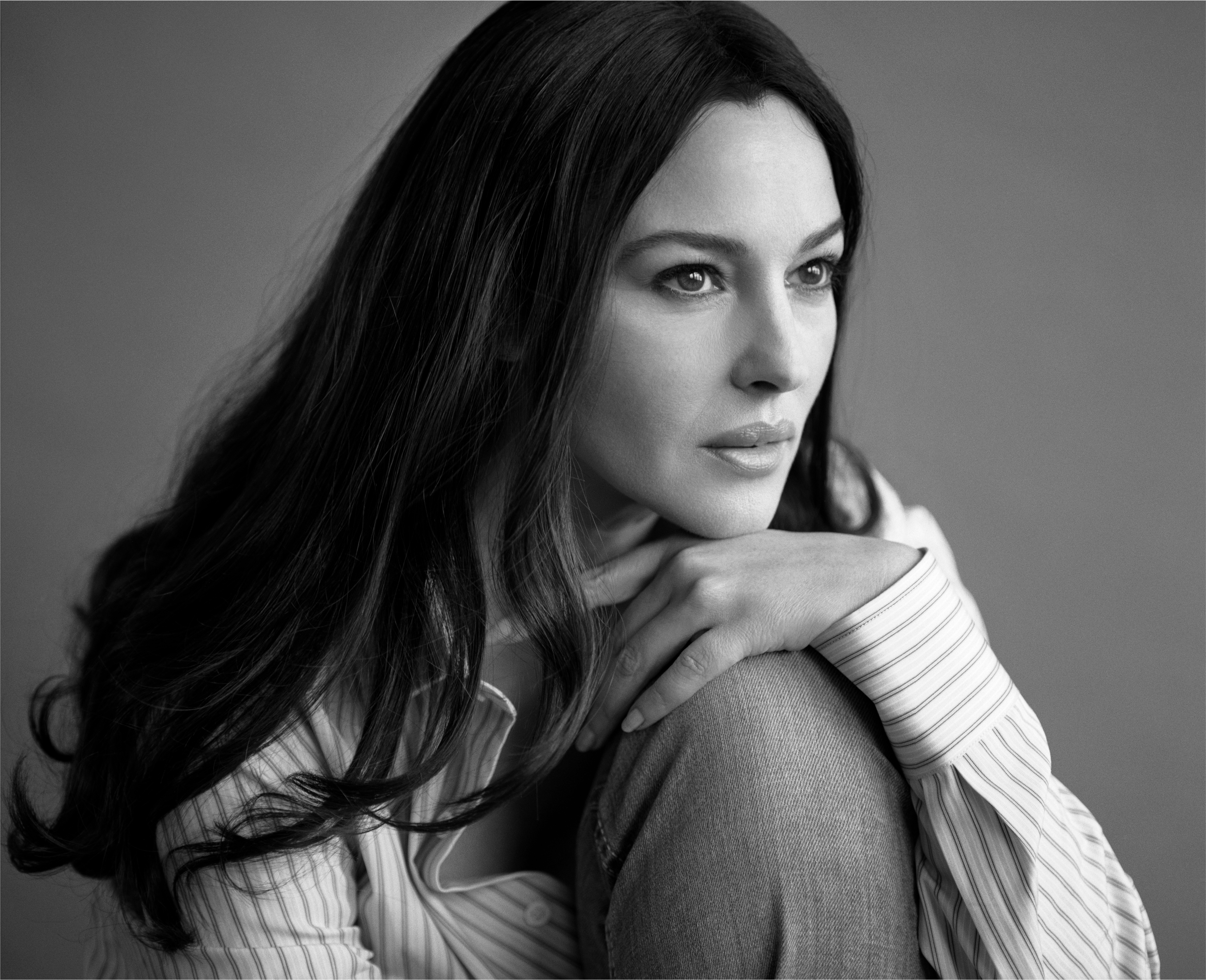
Bellucci in 2009

Christophe Narbonne of Première magazine wrote: "Behind the advertising muse, the image of the (re)incarnated Italian diva and the globalised sexual icon, we sometimes forget Monica Bellucci the out-of-norm actress, collector of a pile of international cult auteurs". De Morgen wrote: "most roles fit Bellucci like a glove", while Christophe Carrière of L'Express said others of "variable geometry" compose her filmography. In 2018, Bellucci was included in Forbes Italy's list of "Successful women: the 100 winning Italian women". The press call Bellucci a style icon. Bellucci is associated with the wearing of high-value jewellery and an "unwavering commitment" to Cartier, Boucheron and Chopard; Naomi Pike of British Vogue referred to her as "A Modern Day Liz Taylor", and said when dressed in diamonds, "few contemporary Hollywood stars can rival Italian actor Monica Bellucci".

On 10 April 2016, the agency Karin Models, which represented Bellucci, opened an official Instagram account for her. Instagram censored a photograph Fred Meylan imaged in 2016 showing Bellucci swimming on her back in a pool, and body parts were hidden in yellow pixels.

=== Appearance ===
Bellucci is widely regarded as "the most beautiful woman in the world" and has been cited as a sex symbol. In 2001, Bellucci was pictured nude with caviar on her breasts on the cover of Esquire's Desire issue. (Note: Many photographs of Bellucci taken by fashion photographer Fabrizio Ferri, notably where she was drizzled with honey, appeared regularly in the two direct competitor magazines, Esquire and GQ's Italian edition.) In their reviews of Malèna (2000), Thomas wrote in Los Angeles Times Bellucci "has the impact of the great Italian stars", and Paul Tatara of CNN International called her a "world-class bombshell". In 2002, AskMen named her number one on the "Top 99 Most Desirable Women". Bellucci was included in Empire's list of "Sexiest Women". In 2003, Chris Campion of The Daily Telegraph stated: "'La Bellucci' is Italy's national sweetheart and an icon of European cinema". Bellucci was named the "Most Beautiful Woman in the World" in 2004 and 2007 in an Ipsos survey of 1,002 people in France that was commissioned by TF1.

In 2011, Bellucci was ranked fourth in Los Angeles Times Magazine's list of the "50 most beautiful women in film". She was voted number one on NRJ 12's list of "100 sexiest stars of 2011", which was based on a nationwide survey conducted in France that included American and French actresses, models, singers, female athletes and television presenters. In 2012, Bellucci said she had never undergone cosmetic procedures, saying: "I don't like the idea of having my face retouched and, frankly, I think it's quite dangerous for an actress. ... Compared to a plastic face, I prefer wrinkles."

In The Times, Pearce called Bellucci "arguably the world's most beautiful actress", saying she has the propensity to specialise in playing "[u]gly scenes", which is exemplified by the rape scene in Irréversible (2002). In 2005, Salisbury wrote in The Guardian Bellucci represents an "international object of desire" and said: "[i]n person, as on screen, Bellucci radiates a rare, otherworldly beauty". Based on Bellucci's projected image and her work for Cartier, Kommersant described her as the "type of diva whose fame depends little on her roles". Bellucci's physical characteristics have led her inclusion in lists of all-time beauties and sex symbols compiled by magazines such as Esquire Japan and Men's Health in the US and Australia.

Federico Roberto Antonelli, director of the Italian Cultural Institute in China, said: "everyone dreams of Malèna's Monica Bellucci". In 2021, Vogue France ranked Bellucci fourth in its list of the "most beautiful Italian actresses of all time". Media consider Bellucci an Italian sex symbol. Rolling Stone Italy included Bellucci in its list of "10 greatest sex symbols of the 1990s". She takes a "peaceful" attitude towards ageing and mainly believes in pasta, wine, and a little pilates for her "beauty regime", and is not addicted to exercise and dieting. In 2023, Bellucci said having been "objectified" during her film career did not bother her and that she was aware she had made the most of her body for specific roles. Elisabeth Vincentelli wrote for The New York Times in 2023 that Bellucci has achieved a "reputation as a symbol of European glamour and sophistication" that is "firmly established". In an interview with The Hollywood Reporter India, Tamil director Lokesh Kanagaraj revealed that both he and music composer Anirudh Ravichander are huge fans of Bellucci. Initially, they decided to create a song inspired by her, which led to the Pooja Hegde-starrer track being named "Monica" and being featured on the soundtrack to the 2025 Tamil film Coolie.

== Personal life ==
Bellucci's first marriage was with Italian photographer Claudio Carlos Basso. In a 2006 interview, Bellucci said she met Basso in 1987, when he recruited her for a photography session; she was 23 and he was five years older. Bellucci and Basso married in Monte-Carlo on 3 January 1990. They divorced a year later.

Bellucci was in a relationship with Italian actor Nicola Farron for several years. Farron said they met in 1990 on the set of Vita coi figli. Farron said he felt "an overwhelming passion" for Bellucci. Their relationship became unstable because other men increasingly lusted after Bellucci and the couple separated in 1995.

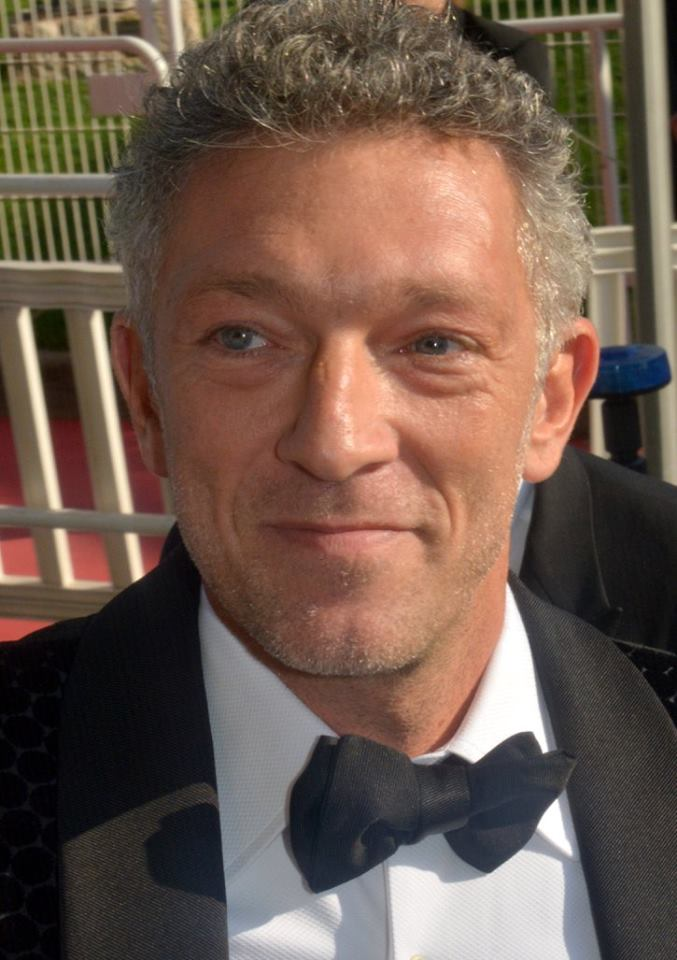
Bellucci's second husband of fourteen years Vincent Cassel in 2018

Bellucci and French actor Vincent Cassel met in 1995 on the set of their film The Apartment. They married in Monaco at the beginning of August 1999. Bellucci and Cassel have two daughters, Deva (born 12 September 2004) and Léonie (born 21 May 2010), both of whom were born in Rome. Film critic Jason Solomons wrote Bellucci and Cassel were "the golden couple of European cinema". (Note: Beatrice Loayza wrote for The New York Times that Bellucci and Cassel "were like the French equivalent" of Nicole Kidman and Tom Cruise.) The couple acted together in nine films between 1996 and 2006. In March 2013, Bellucci reflected on the evolution of their marriage when she and Cassel often lived separately in Italy, France, Brazil and England. The couple's separation by "mutual agreement" was announced on 26 August 2013 (Note: Bellucci and Cassel's separation entered the top 10 trending topics on Twitter following the announcement.) and they later divorced. (Note: In a December 2014 interview, Bellucci said of Cassel: "Love, especially when there are children, is always there". The two have remained close ever since.)

In October 2013, Bellucci said she had almost always been in a relationship since the one with her first boyfriend at the age of fourteen.

In 2019, Bellucci was in a relationship with the French sculptor and former model Nicolas Lefebvre. They had been dating since 2017. Lefebvre, who was then aged 36, and Bellucci made their relationship "official" in early March 2019 during a Chanel show at the Grand Palais in Paris. Bellucci told Italian magazine F about the end of their relationship, which was reported by other media in early July 2019.

In February 2023, Paris Match reported that Bellucci and American filmmaker Tim Burton were in a relationship that began in October 2022. (Note: According to Paris Match, Bellucci and American filmmaker Tim Burton briefly met at the 2006 Cannes Film Festival. They reconnected in October 2022 at the Lumière Film Festival in Lyon.) In June 2023, Bellucci confirmed she was in a relationship with Burton. They made their first public appearance at the Rome Film Festival in October 2023. Their relationship ended in September 2025.

Besides her native Italian, Bellucci is fluent in French and English, and is proficient in Portuguese and Spanish. After her divorce from Cassel, Bellucci lived with her daughters in England, France, and Italy. By 2015, she had decided to live in France. Bellucci said: "I am entirely Italian. Everything about me is Italian", and that "Paris is part of my history". Bellucci said she votes in Italy, not in France, and she does not have French nationality. She owns houses in Rome and Lisbon, and in 2023, she purchased a villa on the Greek island of Paros.

According to Bellucci, she has moved away from her religious roots saying "I come from a Catholic religion, but I'm not Catholic". She has called herself an agnostic. (Note: Bellucci elaborated further: "I am an agnostic, even though I respect and am interested in all religions ... If there's something I believe in, it's a mysterious energy; the one that fills the oceans during tides, the one that unites nature and beings".)

In 2018, French tax authorities investigated Bellucci for non-declaration of a safe and bank accounts in Switzerland that were linked to an offshore company in the British Virgin Islands (BVI). The French authorities tried to recover French taxes for the tax years 2011 to 2013 because they suspected tax evasion; Bellucci's lawyer stated she lived in the UK and not Paris. In September 2021, Bellucci said she was "up to date with my tax obligations both in France and abroad". The results of the investigation into her Swiss bank accounts remain undisclosed. Following the investigation, Bellucci was named in the Pandora Papers, a massive data leak from offshore entities of high-profile figures, that was published in October 2021. (Note: According to Alcogal, the British Virgin Islands offshore company that served to manage her image rights operated from 2011 to 2015 and was liquidated in 2016.)

In 2018, Forbes valued Bellucci's wealth at $45 million, ranking her as the third-richest Italian actor.

== Acting credits and accolades ==
Bellucci has developed her acting career by alternating low-budget arthouse and auteur films with big-budget films in the Italian, French, and American industries.

Bellucci has received honours from the French and Italian governments. In 2006, French Minister of the Interior Nicolas Sarkozy conferred her with the knight insignia of the Order of Arts and Letters. In 2016, French President François Hollande presented her with the knight insignia in the National Order of the Legion of Honour at the Elysée Palace. In 2020, Mayor Dario Nardella awarded Bellucci the Key to the City of Florence.

== See also ==
- List of agnostics
