= Maria by Callas =

2017 documentary

- Theatrical release poster
- Directed by: Tom Volf
- Written by: Tom Volf
- Produced by: Emmanuelle Lepers; Gaël Leblang; Emmanuel Chain; Thierry Bizot; Tom Volf
- Starring: Maria Callas; Joyce DiDonato
- Edited by: Janice Jones
- Distributed by: Haut et Court
- Release dates: November 1, 2017 (Rome Film Festival); December 13, 2017 (France)
- Running time: 113 minutes
- Country: France
- Languages: English, French, Italian
- Box office: $1.3 million

Maria by Callas is a 2017 French documentary film about the life and career of opera singer Maria Callas, written and directed by Tom Volf.

== Synopsis ==
The film depicts the life and work of opera singer Maria Callas in her own words by using her interviews, letters, and performances to tell her story. Told through performances, TV interviews, home movies, family photographs, private letters and unpublished memoirs (nearly all of which have never been shown to the public), the film reveals the essence of a woman who rose from humble beginnings in New York City to become an international superstar and one of the greatest artists of all time. Opera singer Joyce DiDonato reads her letters and unpublished memoirs; Fanny Ardant narrates in the French version.

== Release ==
Maria by Callas premiered at the Rome Film Festival and at the La Baule Film & Score Festival in November 2017. The film had a release in France on December 13, 2017. The film had a limited release in the United States on November 2, 2018. It was shown on BBC Four on Christmas Day 2020.

== Critical reception ==
The film has earned high critical praise. Maria by Callas currently has a score of 91% on review aggregator website Rotten Tomatoes from 80 reviews, with an average rating of 7.1/10. The website's critics consensus reads, "Maria by Callas offers an intimate look at the life of a brilliantly talented artist whose absorbing story matches the operatic heights reached by her work. Metacritic, which uses a weighted average, assigned the film a score of 71 out of 100, based on 18 critics, indicating "generally favorable" reviews.

Based on the film, the one-woman-show Maria Callas: Letters & Memoirs starring Monica Bellucci was shown at the Beacon Theatre in New York on 27 January 2023.
