= On the Milky Road =

- Film poster
- Directed by: Emir Kusturica
- Written by: Emir Kusturica
- Based on: "Our Life" by: Emir Kusturica; Dunja Kusturica
- Produced by: Lucas Akoskin; Alex Garcia; Paula Vaccaro
- Starring: Emir Kusturica; Monica Bellucci; Sloboda Mićalović; Predrag Manojlović
- Cinematography: Goran Volarević; Martin Sec
- Edited by: Svetolic Mica Zajc
- Music by: Stribor Kusturica
- Production companies: BN Films; Pinball London
- Release date: 9 September 2016 (Venice)
- Running time: 125 minutes
- Countries: Bosnia and Herzegovina; Serbia; Mexico; United States; United Kingdom
- Language: Serbian

On the Milky Road (Serbian: На млечном путу / Na mlečnom putu; Italian: Lungo la Via Lattea) is a 2016 film directed by Emir Kusturica, based on his segment "Our Life" in the anthology film Words with Gods. On the Milky Road stars Kusturica and Monica Bellucci. It is a three-part narrative following selected critical periods in the life of a man and his country, from a time war, to when he falls in love and ends as a hermit monk.

== Plot ==
In the midst of the Bosnian War, Kosta (Emir Kusturica), a milkman and falconer, delivers milk from the farm run by Milena, a milkmaid who takes care of her grandmother, and the front where the soldiers are engaged in a never ending war. Milena wants a bride for her brother and, after hearing about a woman of renowned beauty who caught the eye of an English general who subsequently killed his wife to be with her, only to be rejected when the bride testified against him, Milena and her friends smuggle the bride (Monica Bellucci) out of the refugee camp where she is staying to live on the farm until Milena's brother, Zaga, returns.

However Kosta and the bride fall in love with one another. As peace in the war is declared, Kosta allows himself to be roped into a double wedding where he will marry Milena while Zaga marries the bride, but during the wedding festivities the bride takes Kosta aside and the two nearly kiss only to be caught by Milena.

Before the wedding can happen a spy informs the English where the bride is staying. The English arrive and destroy the entire village murdering Zaga and Milena. Kosta is saved when a snake he has been feeding milk attacks him on the road long enough to delay his arrival in the camp. Kosta manages to find the bride, who has escaped the carnage by hiding in a well. She and Kosta go on a run across the country pursued by three Englishmen.

The chase eventually leads Kosta and the bride into a minefield. The bride is accidentally killed when she trips the wire on one of the mines. Kosta wants to commit suicide and join her, but he is stopped by a shepherd who tells him to stay alive so that the memory of their love will live on with him.

Fifteen years later Kosta is living his life as a pious monk. He dreams of being reunited with the bride in the afterlife. In the meantime however he daily drags rocks to the site of her death, filling in the mine field with rocks.

== Cast ==
- Emir Kusturica as Kosta
- Monica Bellucci as bride
- Sloboda Mićalović as Milena
- Predrag Manojlović as Zaga

== Production ==
The film was mostly shot in Herzegovina, namely Trebinje.

== Release ==
The movie was selected to compete for the Golden Lion at the 73rd Venice International Film Festival.

On the review aggregator website Rotten Tomatoes, 50% of 8 critics' reviews are positive, with an average rating of 5.9/10.

Kusturica won the Palme d'Or at the Cannes Film Festival twice for his When Father Was Away on Business and Underground. He and producer Paula Vaccaro said they previewed On the Milky Road to Cannes organizer Thierry Frémaux and that there was interest in it debuting at the 2016 Cannes Film Festival. However, Vaccaro said this was unfeasible as the film was still in the editing process in May 2016. In making these comments, Vaccaro and Kusturica denied earlier reports that Kusturica claimed to have been barred from Cannes for making favorable comments about Russian president Vladimir Putin.
