= Wild Blood (2008 film) =

- Theatrical poster
- Directed by: Marco Tullio Giordana
- Screenplay by: Leone Colonna; Marco Tullio Giordana; Enzo Ungari
- Story by: Marco Tullio Giordana
- Produced by: Angelo Barbagallo
- Starring: Monica Bellucci; Luca Zingaretti; Alessio Boni
- Cinematography: Roberto Forza
- Edited by: Roberto Missiroli
- Music by: Franco Piersanti
- Release date: 17 May 2008
- Running time: 150 minutes
- Country: Italy
- Language: Italian
- Box office: $1,296,450

Wild Blood (Italian: Sanguepazzo) is an Italian biographical drama film directed in 2008 by Marco Tullio Giordana.

== Plot ==
This film tells the story of two renowned actors of the Fascist cinema, Luisa Ferida and Osvaldo Valenti, who were supporters of the Italian Social Republic. Accused of collaboration and torture, they were shot by the Partisans on 30 April 1945, after the country was liberated.

The movie was included in the "uncategorized" group at Cannes Film Festival in 2008.

== Cast ==
- Luca Zingaretti as Osvaldo Valenti
- Monica Bellucci as Luisa Ferida
- Alessio Boni as Golfiero Goffrinni/Taylor
- Maurizio Donadoni as Vero Marozin
- Alessandro Di Natale as Dalmazio
- Luigi Diberti as Cardi
- Tresy Taddei as Irene
- Mattia Sbragia as the film director
- Luigi Lo Cascio as the partisan
- Sonia Bergamasco as the prisoner
