= The Raffle =

1991 film by Francesco Laudadio

- Theatrical release poster
- Italian: La riffa
- Directed by: Francesco Laudadio
- Written by: Francesco Laudadio
- Produced by: Jacopo Capanna; Giuseppe Perugia
- Starring: Monica Bellucci
- Cinematography: Cristiano Pogany
- Edited by: Ugo De Rossi
- Music by: Antonio Di Pofi
- Production companies: Produttori Associati; Filmola
- Distributed by: Artisti Associati
- Release date: 15 November 1991 (Italy)
- Running time: 93 minutes
- Country: Italy
- Language: Italian

The Raffle (Italian: La riffa) is a 1991 Italian comedy-drama film written and directed by Francesco Laudadio. It marked the film debut of Monica Bellucci.

== Plot ==
In Bari, Italy, Francesca, a beautiful and wealthy woman, is widowed and left with her daughter Giulia, and a pile of debts incurred by her husband Maurizio, whose betrayals she also discovers. On the advice of her friend Cesare, who is also a lawyer, Francesca sells off her villa by the sea, furniture, furs and jewelry, as well as a yacht (which Cesare buys), to pay for at least one year of rent, and the tuition for little Giulia's exclusive school.

With no job prospects for Francesca, she and Cesare decide to hold a raffle in which the prize will be Francesca. The raffle will be limited to twenty participants, who will each pay 100 million lire. The winner will have the right to live with Francesca for four years and can ask for whatever he wants. Raffle ticket buyers include friends of the late husband and Cesare himself.

One day, Francesca runs over a young man, Antonio, with whom she begins a love affair. He seems to know about the raffle and, despite proclaiming his amorous passion, he would be willing for her to be enjoyed by the winner, continuing his secret meetings with her. In reality, the penniless young man aims over time to benefit from the raffle money.

A few days before the raffle drawing, however, the prosecutor receives an anonymous complaint about the raffle. Cesare's office is searched, and a scandal threatens to disturb local society. When questioned by the police, Francesca does not deny the raffle, but claims that the prize is actually the yacht purchased by Cesare and the friends have mobilized to help her and the child. To avoid a scandal, the commissioner accepts this story, after which Francesca takes a plane and leaves with Giulia forever, living off the raffle money.

== Cast ==
- Monica Bellucci as Francesca
- Giulio Scarpati as Antonio
- Sandra Collodel as Carla
- Paolo De Vita
- Gianluca Favilla as Enrico
- Marino Masè
- Federico Pacifici as the commissioner
- Tiziana Pini as Camilla
- Renato Scarpa
- Massimo Ghini as Cesare
- Barbara Christina Engelhardt as Barbara
- Maurizio Sciarra as Lawyer Di Cillo (uncredited)
