= Remember Me, My Love =

- Italian: Ricordati di me
- Directed by: Gabriele Muccino
- Screenplay by: Gabriele Muccino; Heidrun Schleef
- Story by: Gabriele Muccino
- Produced by: Domenico Procacci; Nadine Luque
- Starring: Fabrizio Bentivoglio; Laura Morante; Monica Bellucci; Nicoletta Romanoff; Silvio Muccino; Gabriele Lavia
- Cinematography: Marcello Montarsi
- Edited by: Claudio Di Mauro
- Music by: Paolo Buonvino
- Production companies: Fandango; Buena Vista International; Vice Versa Film; Medusa Film
- Distributed by: Medusa Film (Italy); Gaumont Buena Vista International (France)
- Release dates: 14 February 2003 (Italy); 3 September 2004 (USA)
- Running time: 125 minutes
- Countries: Italy; France
- Language: Italian
- Budget: €5 million
- Box office: $12.6 million

Remember Me, My Love (Italian: Ricordati di me) is a 2003 Italian film co-written and directed by Gabriele Muccino.

== Plot ==
At first glance the Ristuccia family is apparently normal and close-knit, but all of its members are hiding something. Carlo, the head of the family, would like to become a writer rather than continue working in an insurance company. Giulia, his wife, is a schoolteacher who aspires to become an actress. Paolo is an insecure teenager who cannot successfully assert himself in front of girls whom he likes. Valentina desires to become a television showgirl at any cost. This silence is broken when Carlo meets his old love Alessia, with whom he starts an extra-marital affair. As a result, he almost ruins the family balance although Giulia tries to save the marriage.

== Awards ==
- 3 Nastro d'Argento Prizes (Best Supporting Actress: Monica Bellucci - Best Screenplay: Gabriele Muccino and Heidrun Schleef - Best Producer: Domenico Procacci and Nadine Luque)

== Soundtrack ==
- Elisa with Almeno tu nell'universo
- Belladonna with Killer (ogni istante è l'ultimo)
- Imani Coppola with Fake is the new real

== Cast ==
- Fabrizio Bentivoglio: Carlo Ristuccia
- Laura Morante: Giulia Ristuccia
- Nicoletta Romanoff: Valentina Ristuccia
- Monica Bellucci: Alessia
- Silvio Muccino: Paolo Ristuccia
- Gabriele Lavia: Alfredo
- Enrico Silvestrin: Stefano Manni
- Silvia Cohen: Elena
- Alberto Gimignani: Riccardo
- Amanda Sandrelli: Louise
- Blas Roca-Rey: Matt
- Pietro Taricone: Paolo Tucci
- Giulia Michelini: Ilaria
- Maria Chiara Augenti: Anna Pezzi
- Andrea Roncato: Luigi
- Stefano Santospago: André
