= Napoleon and Me =

- Theatrical release poster
- Directed by: Paolo Virzì
- Produced by: Riccardo Tozzi; Giovanni Stabilini; Marco Chimenz
- Starring: Daniel Auteuil; Elio Germano; Monica Bellucci; Francesca Inaudi; Sabrina Impacciatore; Valerio Mastandrea; Massimo Ceccherini
- Cinematography: Alessandro Pesci
- Music by: Paolo Buonvino; Juan Bardem
- Distributed by: Medusa Film
- Release date: 2006
- Running time: 110 minutes
- Countries: Italy; France
- Language: Italian

Napoleon and Me (Italian: N (Io e Napoleone), French: Napoléon (et moi), Spanish: N. Napoleón y yo) is a 2006 Italian-French-Spanish historical comedy film directed by Paolo Virzì. It is loosely based on the novel N. by Ernesto Ferrero.

== Plot ==
In Portoferraio, island of Elba, young teacher Martino is fired over his criticism of Napoleon Bonaparte. Then Napoleon is exiled to reign over tiny Elba. He hires Martino as his secretary.

== Cast ==
- Daniel Auteuil as Napoleon Bonaparte
- Elio Germano: Martino Papucci
- Monica Bellucci: Baroness Emilia Speziali
- Sabrina Impacciatore: Diamantina Papucci
- Valerio Mastandrea: Ferrante Papucci
- Francesca Inaudi: Mirella
- Massimo Ceccherini: Cosimo Bartolini
- Omero Antonutti: Master Fontanelli
- Margarita Lozano: Pascalina
- José Ángel Egido as Marchand
- Achille Brugnini as Col. Campbell
- Vincent Lo Monaco as Generale Drouot
- Vittorio Amandola as Sindaco Egisto Lonzi Tognarini
- Emanuele Barresi as Segretario comunale
- Carlo Monni as Notaio Bonci Bacelli

== See also ==
- List of Italian films
