= Ville-Marie (film) =

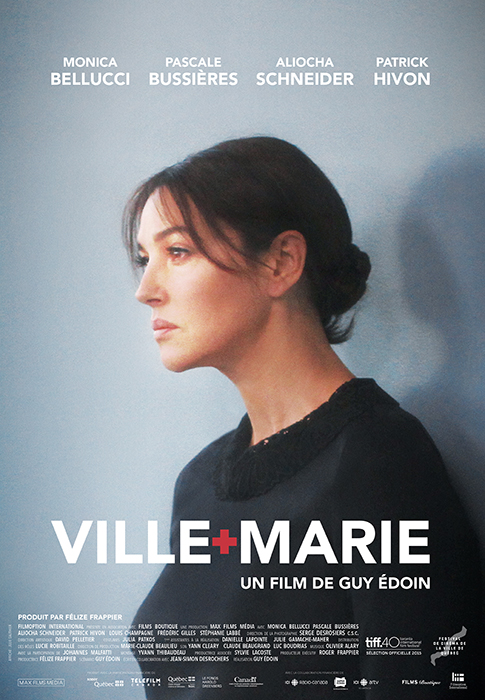
- Directed by: Guy Édoin
- Written by: Guy Édoin; Jean-Simon DesRochers
- Produced by: Félize Frappier
- Starring: Monica Bellucci; Aliocha Schneider; Pascale Bussières; Patrick Hivon
- Cinematography: Serge Desrosiers
- Edited by: Yvann Thibaudeau
- Music by: Olivier Alary; Johannes Malfatti
- Production company: Max Films Media
- Release date: September 12, 2015 (TIFF)
- Running time: 101 minutes
- Country: Canada
- Language: French

Ville-Marie is a Canadian drama film, directed by Guy Édoin and released in 2015.

The film stars Monica Bellucci as Sophie, a successful French film actress who is in Montreal to make a new film and to reconnect with her estranged gay son Thomas (Aliocha Schneider), whom she has not seen in three years due to her unwillingness to tell him anything about his father. However, the two are drawn into an unexpected tragedy when Thomas witnesses a young woman walking directly into oncoming traffic at a street corner, fatefully connecting their emotional difficulties to those of Pierre (Patrick Hivon), the paramedic who arrives to treat the young woman, and Marie (Pascale Bussières), the emergency department nurse on duty at the hospital.

The film premiered at the 2015 Toronto International Film Festival.

== Cast ==
- Monica Bellucci as Sophie Bernard
- Pascale Bussières as Marie Santerre
- Aliocha Schneider as Thomas
- Patrick Hivon as Pierre Pascal
- Louis Champagne as Benoit Tremblay
- Frédéric Gilles as Robert M.
- Stéphanie Labbé as Danica Bédard
- Marie-Evelyne Lessard as Dr. Robillard
- Sandrine Bisson as Serveuse au bar

== See also ==
- List of lesbian, gay, bisexual or transgender-related films of 2015
