= Vita coi figli =

1991 television miniseries

- Italian: Vita coi figli
- Written by: Dino Risi; Ennio De Concini
- Directed by: Dino Risi
- Starring: Giancarlo Giannini; Corinne Clery; Nicola Farron; Monica Bellucci
- Music by: Stelvio Cipriani
- Original language: Italian

Production
- Cinematography: Luigi Kuveiller
- Production companies: Reteitalia; International Video 80

Original release
- Release: May 1991

Vita coi figli is a 1991 Italian television miniseries directed by Dino Risi and broadcast by Canale 5. The two-episode made-for-television film was released in May 1991 and drew 5 million viewers.

Vita coi figli features the acting debut of then-fashion model Monica Bellucci.

== Cast ==
- Giancarlo Giannini as Adriano Setti
- Monica Bellucci as Elda
- Corinne Cléry as Valeria
- Nicola Farron
- Tamara Donà as Francesca
- Valeria Ciangottini
