= World Award =

The World Awards were founded by the writer Georg Kindel; Mikhail Gorbachev was their president. An international jury selects extraordinary individuals for their achievements in a variety of areas such as acting, arts, business, media, health and others.

The first World Awards were held in November 2000 at the Imperial Hofburg Palace in Vienna, Austria; the fourth World Awards 2003 were hosted in Hamburg, Germany.

World Awards Media GmbH went into liquidation in late 2008.

== Men's World Day ==
Men's World Day was observed in Austria in the first week of November annually in the years 2000–04. It was conceived by author George Kindel and inaugurated in November 2000. A central motivation for Kindel was his understanding that "the testosterone influenced brain of men" is the main reason for men's violent nature, and why he also believed that women would never be capable of violence and brutality. Due to the male propensity for violence Kindel proposed that Men's World Day not be conceived as a day to celebrate men but rather a day of introspection and self-criticism. He also wanted to show that there are some males who have had a positive, nonviolent influence on our world and to award them as role models.

Mikhail Gorbachev offered to act as co-founder and president of the event after an invitation by Kindel who had described it to him as a 'men's health' initiative. Men's World Day consisted primarily of a world awards event to recognise and honour men who exemplify the best attributes of mankind. Men recognized and awarded at this event include Michael Jackson, Michael Douglas, Morgan Freeman, Plácido Domingo, Christopher Reeve, the Bee Gees, Yusuf Islam a.k.a. Cat Stevens, Sir Paul McCartney, Sir Richard Branson, Steven Spielberg, Luciano Pavarotti, Christiaan Barnard and Ted Turner.

Men's World Day has been promoted as a world event but has not been officially celebrated by any other countries except Austria, and Germany in 2003 It was recognized by the United Nations in Vienna and by the Gorbachev Foundation who jointly organized the annual event for four years before it was terminated and replaced with a new gender neutral celebration.

Due to the perceived inequity of having a day devoted to honouring males alone, the 'Men's World Day' event was terminated and replaced with a new gender neutral event named 'The World Awards' which now permanently includes the honouring and awarding of women.

The second event is the Save The World Awards which recognizes and awards equal numbers of women and men who have contributed to a sustainable, green and livable future for our planet and its people. Women who have received awards at the Women's World Awards include Monica Bellucci for acting, Anastacia for singing, Bar Refaeli for style, Angela Missoni for fashion, Kelly Clarkson for entertainment, Esther Mujawayo-Keiner for social activities, Elle Macpherson for her modelling career, and Oprah Winfrey. The World Awards emphasises that the 20th century was marked by many women who also strived for equality, freedom and who all stood for peace and tolerance as well as civil rights.

== Women's World Award ==
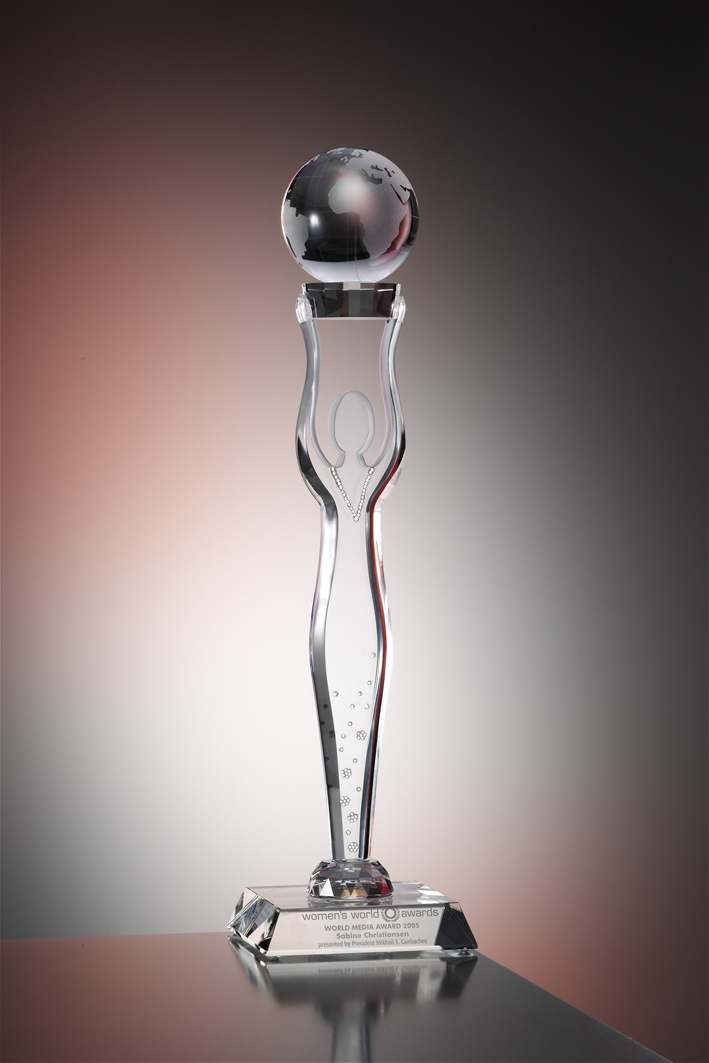
Women's World Award

The Women's award honours women exclusively and has become the world's most important honors for women, annually reaching more than 500 million people around the globe via television, print media, radio and the Internet. The 2009 Women's World Awards television special was broadcast in 51 countries of the world, more than 400 journalists, photographers and 31 TV teams from around the globe. Winners of the Women's World Award, sponsored by the World Award organization headed by former Soviet Union President Mikhail Gorbachev, intended for women who have influenced the world by their work in areas such as society or politics. The award has been given since 2004. No monetary prize is attached; the prize token has shape of a glass female silhouette.

=== 2009 ===
March 5, 2009 in Vienna, Austria;

- World Achievement Award: Betty Williams
- World Actress Award: Monica Bellucci
- World Entertainment Award: Kelly Clarkson
- World Hope Award: Nujood Ali
- World Lifetime Achievement Award: Marianne Faithfull
- World Fashion Award: Angela Missioni
- World Business Award: Marilyn Carlson Nelson
- World Tolerance Award: Claudia Cardinale
- World Artist Award: Anastacia
- World Social Award: Esther Mujawayo

=== 2006 ===
October 14, 2006 in New York City, U.S.A.; awardees include:

- World Achievement Award: Shana Dale
- World Charity Award: Sharon Stone
- World Entertainment Award: Whoopi Goldberg
- World Hope Award: Stella Deetjen
- World Lifetime Achievement Award: Susan Sarandon
- World Social Award: Lucy Liu
- World Style Award: Claudia Schiffer
- World Tolerance Award: Queen Noor of Jordan
- World Artist Award: Mary J. Blige
- Woman of the year: Robin Herbert

=== 2005 ===
November 29, 2005 in Leipzig, Germany, were awarded:

- World Achievement Award: Alison Lapper
- World Actress Award: Teri Hatcher
- World Artist Award for Lifetime Achievement: Catherine Deneuve
- World Arts Award: Lisa Stansfield
- World Fashion Award: Donatella Versace
- World Fashion Icon Award: Linda Evangelista
- World Media Award: Sabine Christiansen
- World Social Award: Sarah, Duchess of York
- World Tolerance Award: Benazir Bhutto
- Woman of the Year: Margarete Gehring representing the about 5500 mothers of the SOS Children's Villages

=== 2004 ===
June 9, 2004 in Hamburg, Germany, were awarded:

- World Achievement Award: Bianca Jagger
- World Actress Award: Diane Kruger
- World Artist Award for Lifetime Achievement: Whitney Houston and Dionne Warwick
- World Artists Award: Nena
- World Arts Award: Cher
- World Business Award: Katarina Witt
- World Charity Award: Ute-Henriette Ohoven (Henriette Ohoven)
- World Connection Award: Valentina Tereshkova
- World Entertainment Award: Oprah Winfrey
- World Fashion Award: Vivienne Westwood
- World Fashion Icon Award: Naomi Campbell
- World Media Award: Christiane Amanpour
- World Social Award: Waris Dirie
- World Style Award: Nadja Auermann
- World Tolerance Award: Iris Berben
- Woman of the Year: Agnes Wessalowski

== See also ==
- List of awards honoring women
