= Words with Gods =

2014 film

- Film poster
- Directed by: Guillermo Arriaga; Emir Kusturica; Amos Gitai; Mira Nair; Warwick Thornton; Héctor Babenco; Bahman Ghobadi; Hideo Nakata; Álex de la Iglesia
- Screenplay by: Álex de la Iglesia; Jorge Guerricaechevarría
- Produced by: Alex Garcia; Guillermo Arriaga; Lukas Akoskin
- Music by: Lorne Balfe; Peter Gabriel
- Release dates: 30 August 2014 (Venice); 20 November 2014 (Mexico)
- Running time: 133 minutes
- Countries: Mexico; United States

Words with Gods is a 2014 Mexican-U.S. anthology film. It is the first of a planned series of such films, collectively titled Heartbeat of the World. Words with Gods consists of segments directed by nine directors. It was screened out of competition at the 71st Venice International Film Festival. Words with Gods follows the theme of religion, specifically as it relates to an individual's relationship with his/her god or gods. The order of the film segments was curated by Nobel Prize winner Mario Vargas Llosa.
