= Furlong (surname) =

Furlong is an English-language surname, relatively common in the Republic of Ireland and in the United Kingdom. It originates from England and is classified as a local surname, derived from the Old English word furlang, meaning "furrow length" — a traditional measurement of distance equivalent to one-eighth of a mile. It likely referred to someone who lived near or worked in long fields or furrows. The name was brought to Ireland during the Norman invasion in the 12th century and became established particularly in County Wexford, where it remains relatively common. Variants of the name include Forlong, Furlonge, and others. Today, Furlong is found across Ireland and among Irish diaspora communities in North and South Americas, Australia, and New Zealand.

== People ==
Notable people with the surname include:

- Aaron Henry Furlong (born 1967), American jewellery designer
- Alice Furlong (1866–1946), Irish writer, poet, and political activist
- Allan Furlong (1942–2025), Canadian politician
- Andrew Furlong (born 1947), Irish Catholic priest
- Anthony Furlong (born 1978), American professional skateboarder
- Blair Furlong (born 1945), New Zealand cricketer
- Campbell Furlong (born 1974), New Zealand cricketer
- Cathy Furlong, American statistician
- Charles W. Furlong (1874–1967), American explorer
- Daniel Furlong (born 1998), Irish singer
- Daniel K. Furlong (born 1942), American kidnapper
- Darnell Furlong (born 1995), English footballer
- Dennis Furlong (1945–2018), Canadian politician
- Edward Furlong (born 1977), American actor
- Eileen Furlong, Irish molecular biologist
- Eustace L. Furlong (1874–1950), American paleontologist and fossil preparator
- Frank Furlong (1887–1952), Irish footballer
- Gareth Furlong (born 1992), Welsh field hockey player
- Grant Furlong (1886–1973), American politician
- Harold A. Furlong (1895–1987), American soldier and Medal of Honor recipient
- James Furlong (born 2002), Irish professional footballer
- Jayne Furlong (1976–1993), New Zealand abductee
- Jim Furlong (1940–2026), Canadian football player
- July Furlong, Mexican actress, journalist, and singer
- June Furlong (1930–2020), English life model
- Lawrence O'Brien Furlong (1856–1908), Newfoundland merchant and politician
- Leo Furlong (1930–2009), American politician
- Mack Furlong, Canadian actor, writer, and musician from Newfoundland and Labrador
- Magdalena González Furlong (born 1958), Mexican politician
- Martin Furlong (born 1946), Irish footballer
- Martin W. Furlong (1864–1916), Newfoundland lawyer and politician
- Matt Furlong (died 1798), Irish rebel fighter
- Monica Furlong (1930–2003), British author, journalist and activist
- Montague James Furlong (1868–1913), Australian middleweight boxer known as "Jim Hall"
- Neville Furlong (1968–2017), Irish rugby union international player
- Nicola Furlong, Canadian novelist
- Nicola Furlong, Irish murder victim in Japan
- Noel Furlong (1937–2021), Irish poker player
- Oscar Furlong (1927–2018), Argentine basketball player
- Paul Furlong (born 1968), English footballer
- Philip Joseph Furlong (1892–1989), American Catholic bishop
- Rhodri Furlong (born 1995), Welsh field hockey player
- Rob Furlong (born 1976), Canadian sniper who holds the record for the longest sniper kill in combat
- Ronald Furlong (born 1936), Australian cricketer
- Seánie Furlong, Irish footballer
- Shirley Furlong (born 1959), American professional golfer
- Steve Furlong (born 1967), English-born Australian tennis player
- Tadhg Furlong (born 1992), Irish rugby player
- Tommy Furlong (1931–2019), Irish footballer and hurler
- Walter Furlong (1893–1973), Irish politician
- Wilhelmina Weber Furlong (1878–1962), German-American artist and teacher
- William R. Furlong (1881–1976), American naval admiral

== Disambiguation pages ==
- John Furlong (disambiguation)
- Nicholas Furlong (disambiguation)
- Thomas Furlong (disambiguation)

== Fictional characters ==
- Chance "T-Bone" Furlong, from Swat Kats
- Father Noel Furlong, from the sitcom Father Ted

== See also ==
- Furlong Flynn (1901–1977), American football player and aviation pioneer
- Furlonge
- The Last Furlong, an Irish comedy-drama television series
