= List of accolades received by Ex Machina (film) =

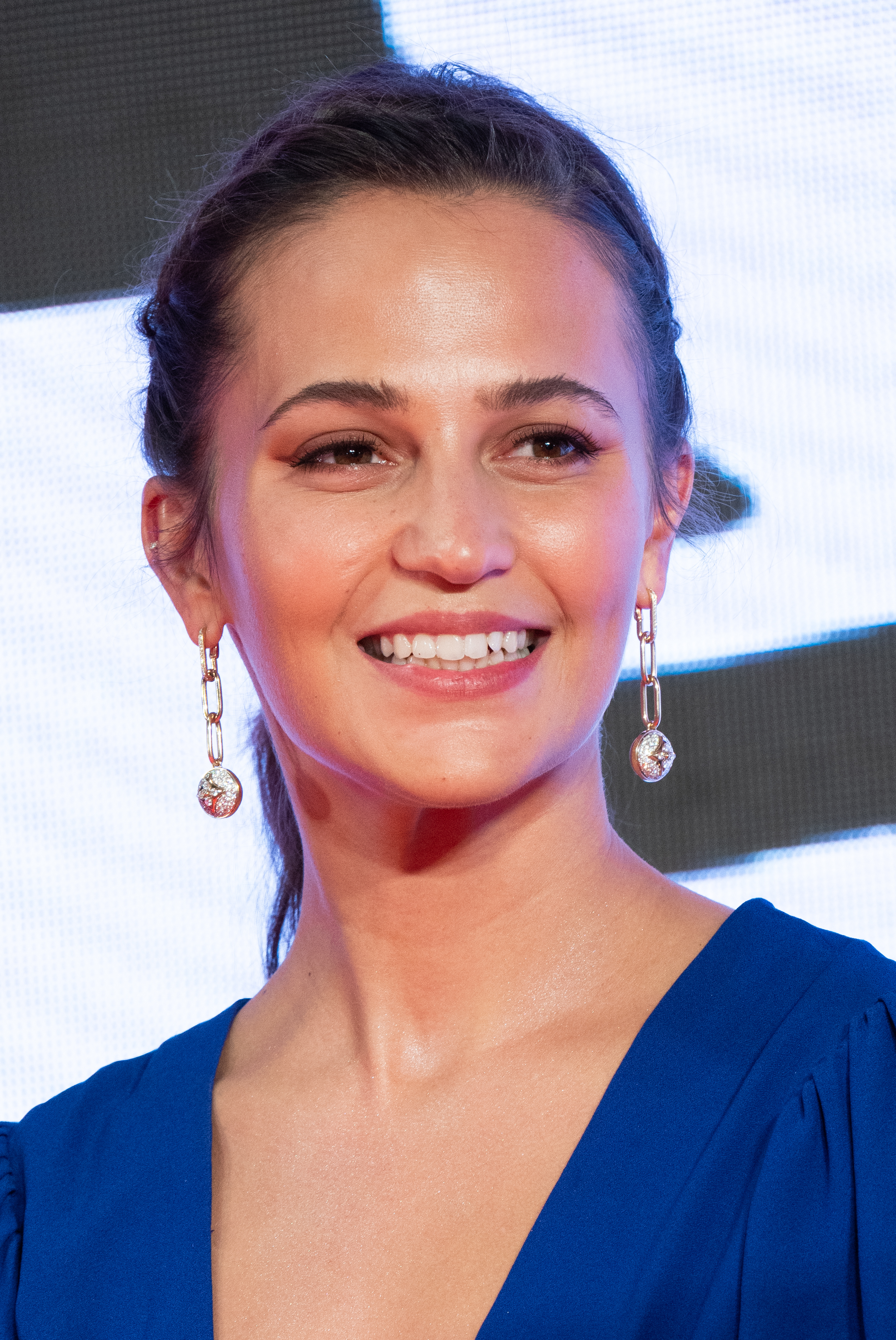
- Alicia Vikander received multiple awards and nominations for her role in the film.
Accolades
| Award | Wins | Nominations |
| AACTA International Awards | 0 | 1 |
| Academy Awards | 1 | 2 |
| Alliance of Women Film Journalists | 1 | 3 |
| Art Directors Guild Awards | 0 | 1 |
| ASCAP Film and Television Music Awards | 0 | 1 |
| Austin Film Critics Association | 2 | 6 |
| Bodil Awards | 0 | 1 |
| Boston Society of Film Critics | 1 | 1 |
| British Academy Film Awards | 0 | 5 |
| British Independent Film Awards | 4 | 5 |
| British Society of Cinematographers | 0 | 1 |
| Calgary Underground Film Festival | 1 | 1 |
| Chicago Film Critics Association | 2 | 3 |
| Costume Designers Guild Awards | 0 | 1 |
| Critics' Choice Movie Awards | 1 | 3 |
| Dallas–Fort Worth Film Critics Association | 1 | 1 |
| Detroit Film Critics Society | 1 | 3 |
| Directors Guild of America Awards | 1 | 1 |
| Dorian Awards | 0 | 1 |
| Dublin Film Critics Circle | 0 | 1 |
| Empire Awards | 0 | 1 |
| European Film Awards | 0 | 2 |
| Festival international du film fantastique de Gérardmer | 1 | 1 |
| Florida Film Critics Circle | 2 | 5 |
| Georgia Film Critics Association | 2 | 6 |
| Golden Globe Awards | 0 | 1 |
| Golden Trailer Awards | 2 | 3 |
| Gopo Awards | 0 | 1 |
| Houston Film Critics Society | 0 | 3 |
| Hugo Awards | 0 | 1 |
| IFTA Film & Drama Awards | 0 | 2 |
| Imagine Film Festival | 1 | 1 |
| International Cinephile Society | 1 | 1 |
| Ivor Novello Awards | 1 | 1 |
| London Film Critics' Circle | 0 | 4 |
| Los Angeles Film Critics Association | 1 | 1 |
| Make-Up Artists and Hair Stylists Guild Awards | 0 | 2 |
| MTV Movie Awards | 0 | 1 |
| National Board of Review | 1 | 1 |
| National Film Awards UK | 0 | 6 |
| National Society of Film Critics | 1 | 1 |
| Nebula Award | 0 | 1 |
| New York Film Critics Online | 2 | 2 |
| Online Film Critics Society | 1 | 3 |
| Producers Guild of America Awards | 0 | 1 |
| Rondo Hatton Classic Horror Awards | 0 | 1 |
| San Diego Film Critics Society | 4 | 9 |
| San Francisco Film Critics Circle | 0 | 2 |
| Santa Barbara International Film Festival | 1 | 1 |
| Saturn Awards | 0 | 6 |
| St. Louis Film Critics Association | 1 | 3 |
| Toronto Film Critics Association | 2 | 2 |
| Vancouver Film Critics Circle | 1 | 1 |
| Washington D.C. Area Film Critics Association | 1 | 3 |
| World Soundtrack Awards | 0 | 2 |
| Writers' Guild of Great Britain | 0 | 1 |

Totals (Note: Certain award groups do not simply award one winner. They acknowledge several different recipients, have runners-up, and have third place. Since this is a specific recognition and is different from losing an award, runner-up mentions are considered wins in this award tally. For simplification and to avoid errors, each award in this list has been presumed to have had a prior nomination.)
- Wins: 42
- Nominations: 125

Ex Machina is a 2014 science fiction film written and directed by Alex Garland in his directorial debut. There are four significant characters, played by Domhnall Gleeson, Alicia Vikander, Sonoya Mizuno, and Oscar Isaac. In the film, programmer Caleb Smith (Gleeson) is invited by his CEO (Issac) to administer the Turing test to an intelligent humanoid robot (Vikander).

Made on a budget of $15 million, Ex Machina grossed $36 million worldwide and received critical acclaim. The National Board of Review recognised Ex Machina as one of the ten best independent films of the year and at the 88th Academy Awards the film won the award for Best Visual Effects and additionally was nominated for Best Original Screenplay. At the 69th British Academy Film Awards and at the British Independent Film Awards 2015, Ex Machina received five nominations each and won four awards at the latter ceremony. Vikander's performance earned her Golden Globe Award, BAFTA Award, European Film Award and Saturn Award nominations as well as several critic award wins.

== Accolades ==
| Award / Association / Film festival | Date of ceremony | Category | Recipient(s) | Result | Ref. |
|---|---|---|---|---|---|
| AACTA International Awards | 29 January 2016 | Best Screenplay – International | Alex Garland | Nominated | |
| Academy Awards | 28 February 2016 | Best Original Screenplay | Alex Garland | Nominated | |
| Academy Awards | 28 February 2016 | Best Visual Effects | Andrew Whitehurst, Paul Norris, Mark Williams Ardington and Sara Bennett | Won | |
| Alliance of Women Film Journalists | 13 January 2016 | Best Supporting Actress | Alicia Vikander | Nominated | |
| Alliance of Women Film Journalists | 13 January 2016 | Best Original Screenplay | Alex Garland | Nominated | |
| Alliance of Women Film Journalists | 13 January 2016 | Best Breakthrough Performance | Alicia Vikander | Won | |
| Art Directors Guild | 31 January 2016 | Excellence in Production Design for a Contemporary Film | Mark Digby | Nominated | |
| ASCAP Film and Television Music Awards | 24 March 2016 | Best Film Score | Ben Salisbury and Geoff Barrow | Nominated | |
| Austin Film Critics Association | 29 December 2015 | Best Film | Ex Machina | 6th place | |
| Austin Film Critics Association | 29 December 2015 | Best Supporting Actor | Oscar Isaac | Nominated | |
| Austin Film Critics Association | 29 December 2015 | Best Supporting Actress | Alicia Vikander | Won | |
| Austin Film Critics Association | 29 December 2015 | Best Original Screenplay | Alex Garland | Nominated | |
| Austin Film Critics Association | 29 December 2015 | Best First Film | Alex Garland | Won | |
| Austin Film Critics Association | 29 December 2015 | Breakthrough Artist Award | Alicia Vikander | Nominated | |
| Bodil Awards | 4 March 2017 | Best Non-American Film | Ex Machina | Nominated | |
| Boston Society of Film Critics | 6 December 2015 | Best New Filmmaker | Alex Garland | Runner-up | |
| British Academy Film Awards | 14 February 2016 | Outstanding British Film | Alex Garland, Andrew Macdonald, and Allon Reich | Nominated | |
| British Academy Film Awards | 14 February 2016 | Best Actress in a Supporting Role | Alicia Vikander | Nominated | |
| British Academy Film Awards | 14 February 2016 | Best Original Screenplay | Alex Garland | Nominated | |
| British Academy Film Awards | 14 February 2016 | Outstanding Debut by a British Writer, Director or Producer | Alex Garland | Nominated | |
| British Academy Film Awards | 14 February 2016 | Best Special Visual Effects | Andrew Whitehurst, Paul Norris, Mark Williams Ardington and Sara Bennett | Nominated | |
| British Independent Film Awards | 6 December 2015 | Best British Independent Film | Alex Garland, Andrew Macdonald, and Allon Reich | Won | |
| British Independent Film Awards | 6 December 2015 | Best Director | Alex Garland | Won | |
| British Independent Film Awards | 6 December 2015 | Best Screenplay | Alex Garland | Won | |
| British Independent Film Awards | 6 December 2015 | Best Technical Achievement | Mark Digby (Production Design) | Nominated | |
| British Independent Film Awards | 6 December 2015 | Best Technical Achievement | Andrew Whitehurst (Visual Effects) | Won | |
| British Society of Cinematographers | 19 July 2015 | Best Cinematography in a Theatrical Feature Film | Rob Hardy | Nominated | |
| Calgary Underground Film Festival | 13–19 April 2015 | Audience Award for Best Narrative Feature | Ex Machina | Won | |
| Chicago Film Critics Association | 16 December 2015 | Best Supporting Actress | Alicia Vikander | Won | |
| Chicago Film Critics Association | 16 December 2015 | Best Original Screenplay | Alex Garland | Nominated | |
| Chicago Film Critics Association | 16 December 2015 | Most Promising Filmmaker | Alex Garland | Won | |
| Costume Designers Guild Awards | 23 February 2016 | Excellence in Fantasy Film | Sammy Sheldon Differ | Nominated | |
| Critics' Choice Movie Awards | 17 January 2016 | Best Sci-Fi/Horror Movie | Ex Machina | Won | |
| Critics' Choice Movie Awards | 17 January 2016 | Best Original Screenplay | Alex Garland | Nominated | |
| Critics' Choice Movie Awards | 17 January 2016 | Best Visual Effects | Ex Machina | Nominated | |
| Dallas–Fort Worth Film Critics Association | 14 December 2015 | Best Supporting Actress | Alicia Vikander | Runner-up | |
| Detroit Film Critics Society | 14 December 2015 | Best Supporting Actor | Oscar Isaac | Nominated | |
| Detroit Film Critics Society | 14 December 2015 | Best Supporting Actress | Alicia Vikander | Nominated | |
| Detroit Film Critics Society | 14 December 2015 | Best Breakthrough | Alicia Vikander | Won | |
| Directors Guild of America Awards | 6 February 2016 | Outstanding Directorial Achievement of a First-Time Feature Film Director | Alex Garland | Won | |
| Dorian Awards | 19 January 2016 | Unsung Film of the Year | Ex Machina | Nominated | |
| Dublin Film Critics Circle | 22 December 2015 | Best Film | Ex Machina | 5th Place | |
| Empire Awards | 29 March 2015 | Best Actress | Alicia Vikander | Nominated | |
| European Film Awards | 12 December 2015 | Best Actress | Alicia Vikander | Nominated | |
| European Film Awards | 12 December 2015 | Best Screenwriter | Alex Garland | Nominated | |
| Festival international du film fantastique de Gérardmer | 28 January – 1 February 2015 | Jury Prize | Ex Machina | Won | |
| Florida Film Critics Circle | 23 December 2015 | Best Supporting Actor | Oscar Isaac | Won | |
| Florida Film Critics Circle | 23 December 2015 | Best Supporting Actress | Alicia Vikander | Nominated | |
| Florida Film Critics Circle | 23 December 2015 | Best Original Screenplay | Alex Garland | Nominated | |
| Florida Film Critics Circle | 23 December 2015 | Best Visual Effects | Ex Machina | Nominated | |
| Florida Film Critics Circle | 23 December 2015 | Pauline Kael Breakout Award | Alicia Vikander | Runner-up | |
| Georgia Film Critics Association | 8 January 2016 | Best Picture | Ex Machina | Nominated | |
| Georgia Film Critics Association | 8 January 2016 | Best Supporting Actress | Alicia Vikander | Won | |
| Georgia Film Critics Association | 8 January 2016 | Best Original Screenplay | Alex Garland | Nominated | |
| Georgia Film Critics Association | 8 January 2016 | Best Production Design | Mark Digby, Katrina Mackay, and Denis Schnegg | Nominated | |
| Georgia Film Critics Association | 8 January 2016 | Breakthrough Award | Alicia Vikander | Won | |
| Georgia Film Critics Association | 8 January 2016 | Breakthrough Award | Alex Garland | Nominated | |
| Golden Globe Awards | 10 January 2016 | Best Supporting Actress – Motion Picture | Alicia Vikander | Nominated | |
| Golden Trailer Awards | 6 May 2015 | Best Thriller | "Human" | Nominated | |
| Golden Trailer Awards | 6 May 2015 | Best Foreign Thriller Trailer | "Human" | Won | |
| Golden Trailer Awards | 6 May 2015 | Best Foreign TV Spot | "Spritz" | Won | |
| Gopo Awards | 28 March 2016 | Best European Film | Ex Machina | Nominated | |
| Houston Film Critics Society | 9 January 2016 | Best Picture | Ex Machina | Nominated | |
| Houston Film Critics Society | 9 January 2016 | Best Supporting Actress | Alicia Vikander | Nominated | |
| Houston Film Critics Society | 9 January 2016 | Best Poster | Ex Machina | Nominated | |
| Hugo Awards | 20 August 2016 | Best Dramatic Presentation – Long Form | Alex Garland | Nominated | |
| IFTA Film & Drama Awards | 9 April 2016 | Best International Film | Ex Machina | Nominated | |
| IFTA Film & Drama Awards | 9 April 2016 | Best Actor in a Lead Role – Film | Domhnall Gleeson | Nominated | |
| Imagine Film Festival | 8–18 April 2015 | Silver Scream Award | Ex Machina | Won | |
| International Cinephile Society | 21 February 2015 | Best Supporting Actor | Oscar Isaac | Won | |
| Ivor Novello Awards | 19 May 2016 | Best Original Film Score | Ben Salisbury and Geoff Barrow | Won | |
| London Film Critics' Circle | 17 January 2016 | Supporting Actor of the Year | Oscar Isaac | Nominated | |
| London Film Critics' Circle | 17 January 2016 | Supporting Actress of the Year | Alicia Vikander | Nominated | |
| London Film Critics' Circle | 17 January 2016 | Breakthrough British/Irish Filmmaker of the Year | Alex Garland | Nominated | |
| London Film Critics' Circle | 17 January 2016 | Technical Achievement | Andrew Whitehurst | Nominated | |
| Los Angeles Film Critics Association | 6 December 2015 | Best Supporting Actress | Alicia Vikander | Won | |
| Make-Up Artists and Hair Stylists Guild Awards | 20 February 2016 | Best Contemporary Hair Styling – Feature-Length Motion Picture | Siân Grigg and Charlotte Rogers | Nominated | |
| Make-Up Artists and Hair Stylists Guild Awards | 20 February 2016 | Best Special Make-Up Effects – Feature-Length Motion Picture | Siân Grigg, Charlotte Rogers, and Tristan Versluis | Nominated | |
| MTV Movie Awards | 10 April 2016 | Best Female Performance | Alicia Vikander | Nominated | |
| National Board of Review | 1 December 2015 | Top Ten Independent Films | Ex Machina | Won | |
| National Film Awards UK | 31 March 2016 | Best International Film | Ex Machina | Nominated | |
| National Film Awards UK | 31 March 2016 | Best Director | Alex Garland | Nominated | |
| National Film Awards UK | 31 March 2016 | Best Screenplay | Alex Garland | Nominated | |
| National Film Awards UK | 31 March 2016 | Best Breakthrough Performance | Domhnall Gleeson | Nominated | |
| National Film Awards UK | 31 March 2016 | Best Breakthrough Performance | Alicia Vikander | Nominated | |
| National Film Awards UK | 31 March 2016 | Best Newcomer | Sonoya Mizuno | Nominated | |
| National Society of Film Critics | 3 January 2016 | Best Supporting Actress | Alicia Vikander | Runner-up | |
| Nebula Award | 14 May 2016 | Ray Bradbury Award | Ex Machina | Nominated | |
| New York Film Critics Online | 6 December 2015 | Best Debut as a Director | Alex Garland | Won | |
| New York Film Critics Online | 6 December 2015 | Best Breakthrough Performance | Alicia Vikander | Won | |
| Online Film Critics Society | 13 December 2015 | Best Picture | Ex Machina | Nominated | |
| Online Film Critics Society | 13 December 2015 | Best Supporting Actor | Oscar Isaac | Won | |
| Online Film Critics Society | 13 December 2015 | Best Original Screenplay | Alex Garland | Nominated | |
| Producers Guild of America Award | 23 January 2016 | Outstanding Producer of Theatrical Motion Pictures | Andrew Macdonald and Allon Reich | Nominated | |
| Rondo Hatton Classic Horror Awards | 14 April 2016 | Best Movie of 2015 | Ex Machina | Nominated | |
| San Diego Film Critics Society | 14 December 2015 | Best Picture | Ex Machina | Runner-up | |
| San Diego Film Critics Society | 14 December 2015 | Best Actress | Alicia Vikander | Nominated | |
| San Diego Film Critics Society | 14 December 2015 | Best Supporting Actor | Oscar Isaac | Runner-up | |
| San Diego Film Critics Society | 14 December 2015 | Best Original Screenplay | Alex Garland | Nominated | |
| San Diego Film Critics Society | 14 December 2015 | Best Production Design | Mark Digby | Nominated | |
| San Diego Film Critics Society | 14 December 2015 | Best Sound Design | Ex Machina | Nominated | |
| San Diego Film Critics Society | 14 December 2015 | Best Visual Effects | Ex Machina | Nominated | |
| San Diego Film Critics Society | 14 December 2015 | Breakthrough Artist | Alicia Vikander | Runner-up | |
| San Diego Film Critics Society | 14 December 2015 | Body of Work | Alicia Vikander | Won | |
| San Francisco Film Critics Circle | 13 December 2015 | Best Supporting Actress | Alicia Vikander | Nominated | |
| San Francisco Film Critics Circle | 13 December 2015 | Best Original Screenplay | Alex Garland | Nominated | |
| Santa Barbara International Film Festival | 3–13 February 2016 | Virtuosos Award | Alicia Vikander | Won | |
| Saturn Award | 22 June 2016 | Best Science Fiction Film | Ex Machina | Nominated | |
| Saturn Award | 22 June 2016 | Best Director | Alex Garland | Nominated | |
| Saturn Award | 22 June 2016 | Best Writing | Alex Garland | Nominated | |
| Saturn Award | 22 June 2016 | Best Actor | Domhnall Gleeson | Nominated | |
| Saturn Award | 22 June 2016 | Best Supporting Actress | Alicia Vikander | Nominated | |
| Saturn Award | 22 June 2016 | Best Special Effects | Andrew Whitehurst, Paul Norris, Mark Williams Ardington and Sara Bennett | Nominated | |
| St. Louis Film Critics Association | 21 December 2015 | Best Supporting Actress | Alicia Vikander | Won | |
| St. Louis Film Critics Association | 21 December 2015 | Best Original Screenplay | Alex Garland | Nominated | |
| St. Louis Film Critics Association | 21 December 2015 | Best Visual Effects | Ex Machina | Nominated | |
| Toronto Film Critics Association | 14 December 2015 | Best Supporting Actress | Alicia Vikander | Won | |
| Toronto Film Critics Association | 14 December 2015 | Best First Feature | Ex Machina | Won | |
| Vancouver Film Critics Circle | 21 December 2015 | Best Supporting Actress | Alicia Vikander | Won | |
| Washington D.C. Area Film Critics Association | 7 December 2015 | Best Director | Alex Garland | Nominated | |
| Washington D.C. Area Film Critics Association | 7 December 2015 | Best Supporting Actress | Alicia Vikander | Won | |
| Washington D.C. Area Film Critics Association | 7 December 2015 | Best Original Screenplay | Alex Garland | Nominated | |
| World Soundtrack Awards | 24 October 2015 | Discovery of the Year | Ben Salisbury and Geoff Barrow | Nominated | |
| World Soundtrack Awards | 24 October 2015 | Public Choice Award | Ben Salisbury and Geoff Barrow | Nominated | |
| Writers' Guild of Great Britain | 18 January 2016 | Best Screenplay | Alex Garland | Nominated | |
