= Paul Norris (visual effects) =

British visual effects supervisor

- Occupation: Visual effects supervisor
- Years active: 1998–present

Paul Norris is a British visual effects supervisor best known for his work on Harry Potter and the Prisoner of Azkaban (2004), Harry Potter and the Goblet of Fire (2005), Avengers: Age of Ultron (2015), and Ex Machina (2015).

Norris won the Best Visual Effects at the 88th Academy Awards for his work on the film Ex Machina, sharing with Sara Bennett, Andrew Whitehurst, and Mark Williams Ardington.
