= Mark Ardington =

British visual effects artist (1976–2024)

Mark Stuart Ardington
- Born: Mark Williams
- Died: 27 June 2024
- Other name: Mark Williams Ardington
- Occupation: Visual effects artist
- Years active: 1998–2024
- Children: Two

Mark Stuart Ardington (1976 – 27 June 2024) was a British visual effects artist. He was born as Mark Williams and later sometimes credited also as Mark Williams Ardington.

== Life ==
Ardington studied computer animation & visualisation at Bournemouth University from 1994 to 1997.

He received the 2015 Academy Award for his work on the film Ex Machina in the category of Best Visual Effects. He shared the award with Andrew Whitehurst, Paul Norris, and Sara Bennett.

Mark Ardington died on 27 June 2024, aged 48. He left behind his wife and two daughters.
