= Andrew Whitehurst =

British visual effects artist

- Occupation: Visual effects artist
- Years active: 1996–present

Andrew Whitehurst is a British visual effects artist. Best known for his works in Troy (2004), Charlie and the Chocolate Factory (2005), Harry Potter and the Order of the Phoenix (2007) and Ex Machina (2015).

In 2016, Whitehurst received an Academy Award for Best Visual Effects for his work on the film Ex Machina. He shared the award with Sara Bennett, Paul Norris, and Mark Williams Ardington.
