= Aaron Henry =

Aaron Henry may refer to:

- Aaron Henry (politician) (1922-1997), American civil rights leader and politician
- Aaron Henry Furlong (born 1967), American jewellery designer
- Aaron Henry (American football) (born 1988), American football player and coach
- Aaron Henry (wrestler) (born 1992), known as Aaron Henare, New Zealand professional wrestler
- Aaron Henry (basketball) (born 1999), American basketball player
- Aaron Henry (footballer) (born 2003), English footballer
