= Furlong (disambiguation) =

A furlong is a unit of measurement equal to one-eighth of a mile.

Furlong may also refer to:

- Furlong (surname), a list of individuals with the surname
- Furlong, Pennsylvania, a village in Doylestown Township

== See also ==
- North Furlong Lake (Nevada)
- The Last Furlong
- Village of Columbus and Camp Furlong
