= Furlonge =

Furlonge is an English surname, a variant of the surname Furlong.

== Notable people ==
Notable people with this surname include:

- Carl Furlonge (1932-2015), Trinidadian cricketer
- David Furlonge (born 1958), Trinidadian cricketer and coach
- Hammond Furlonge (born 1934), Trinidadian cricketer
- Kenneth Furlonge (born 1937), Trinidadian cricketer

== See also ==
- Furlong (disambiguation)
