= Crash Pad =

- Theatrical release poster
- Directed by: Kevin Tent
- Written by: Jeremy Catalino
- Produced by: William Horberg; Lauren Bratman
- Starring: Domhnall Gleeson; Christina Applegate; Thomas Haden Church; Nina Dobrev
- Cinematography: Seamus Tierney
- Edited by: Franco Pante
- Music by: Rolfe Kent
- Production companies: Wonderful Films; Indomitable Entertainment; Windowseat Entertainment
- Distributed by: Destination Films; Vertical Entertainment
- Release date: September 25, 2017 (United States)
- Running time: 93 minutes
- Country: United States
- Language: English

Crash Pad is a 2017 American comedy film directed by Kevin Tent, from a screenplay by Jeremy Catalino. It stars Domhnall Gleeson, Christina Applegate, Thomas Haden Church and Nina Dobrev.

It was released through video on demand on September 25, 2017, before opening in a limited release on October 27, 2017, by Destination Films and Vertical Entertainment.

== Plot ==
A hopeless romantic thinks he's found true love with an older woman, only to learn that she's married and that his fling is merely an instrument of revenge against her neglectful husband.

== Cast ==
- Domhnall Gleeson as Stensland
- Thomas Haden Church as Grady Dott
- Christina Applegate as Morgan Dott
- Nina Dobrev as Hannah
- Dan Gill as Lyle
- James Yi as Mr. Laframboise
- Balinder Johal as Muumuu
- Britt Irvin as Carrie
- Anna Van Hooft as Samantha
- Anja Savcic as Peggy the Pony Snuggler
- Aliyah O'Brien as Female Bartender
- Julian Christopher as Billy Ocean

== Production ==
In October 2015, it was announced Domhnall Gleeson, Christina Applegate, Thomas Haden Church and Nina Dobrev had been cast in the film, with Kevin Tent making his directorial debut from a screenplay by Jeremy Catalino. Alexander Payne will serve as an executive producer on the film, alongside William Horberg, Lauren Bratman, Dominic Ianno, Jon Ferro, Stuart Pollok, Joseph McKelheer, Bill Kiely, and Vicki Sotheran under their Wonderful Films, Indomitable Entertainment, Windowseat Entertainment and Sodona Entertainment banners respectively.

== Release ==
The film was released through video on demand on September 25, 2017, before opening in a limited release on October 27, 2017, by Vertical Entertainment and Destination Films.

=== Critical reception ===
Crash Pad received mixed reviews from film critics. It holds a 54% approval rating on review aggregator website Rotten Tomatoes, based on 13 reviews, with a weighted average of 5.07/10. On Metacritic, the film holds a rating of 46 out of 100, based on 5 critics, indicating "mixed or average" reviews.
