= Earth's Greatest Spectacles =

2016 British documentary TV series

- Graphic using international title
- Also known as: Seasonal Wonderlands
- Genre: Nature documentary
- Narrated by: Domhnall Gleeson
- Composer: David Mitcham
- Country of origin: United Kingdom
- Original language: English
- No. of episodes: 3

Production
- Executive producer: Jo Shinner
- Producer: Paul Bradshaw
- Running time: 59 minutes
- Production companies: BBC Natural History Unit; BBC Worldwide

Original release
- Network: BBC Two; BBC Two HD
- Release: 5 February – 19 February 2016

Earth's Greatest Spectacles (released in some countries as Seasonal Wonderlands) is a 2016 British nature documentary series created and produced by the BBC, first shown in February 2016 at BBC Two and BBC Two HD. The series takes on stunning seasonal changes based on the three locations where it reveals the dramatic process which occur for each year and showing how wildlife adapts to cope with the changes.

The series was composed by David Mitcham and narrated by Domhnall Gleeson.

== Broadcast ==
=== British television ===
Earth's Greatest Spectacles premiered on British television on 5 February 2016, broadcast on BBC Two and BBC Two HD, which consisted of total three episodes.

=== International ===
The series was set to broadcast internationally on BBC Earth channel. It debuted in Asia on each Wednesday starting from 20 July 2016, in Nordic region on each Sunday from 14 August 2016, and in South Africa aired each Sunday from 13 November 2016.

The series premiered in Belgium on 24 March 2016 at the Canvas TV and in the Netherlands from 17 May 2016 on NPO 2.

In Japan, the series aired all three episodes on 30 September 2017 at WOWOW's BBC Earth monthly block.

As for the United States, the first episode - New England, is aired at TPT 2 on 4 November 2017.

== Episodes ==
Our planet is a place of constant change. Each year, the seasons shift and life is transformed. But there are places where the changes are so epic in scale they can be seen from space.

— Domhnall Gleeson's opening narration

No.	Title	Original release date
1	"New England"	5 February 2016
The decidedly picturesque north-eastern region of the United States, known as New England, makes a gorgeous stage for one of the most formidable colour changes on the planet when the spectacular greens of summer make way for the glittering golds and ravenous reds of autumn. The first episode shows how this fantastic fiesta is generated by the battles between the trees and the forest's inhabitants. Chipmunks, moose, rattlesnakes and an odd mixture of caterpillars all play a vital role; but surprisingly the forest itself was made to be so colourful thanks to a combination of hard work by beavers, ants and humans.
2	"Svalbard"	12 February 2016
Norwegian archipelago Svalbard isn’t the most welcoming place, being in the Arctic Circle and spending months in total darkness, but when the sun does deign to deliver some sunlight, it’s almost as if a snowy sheet is whipped away to reveal fantastic fauna, winsome wildlife and spectacular sea creatures. The story uncovers the science behind this astonishing ugly duckling act.
3	"Okavango"	19 February 2016
The Okavango Delta is a lush wetland in the middle of the vast, featureless Kalahari Desert. The final episode begins in the dry season six months before the floods arrive, when the waterholes dry up stranding gasping catfish at the mercy of jackals and fish eagles. By April, the first month of the flood, the skies have begun to fill with returning birds and followed by a rich variety of wildlife, learning its unique natural phenomenon governs their life cycles.
