= John Furlong =

John Furlong may refer to:

- John Furlong (actor) (1933–2008), American actor
- John Furlong (cricketer) (born 1972), New Zealand cricketer
- John Furlong (sports administrator) (born 1950), CEO of Vancouver Organizing Committee for the 2010 Olympic and Paralympic Winter Games
- John Furlong (academic), British educationist, author, and academic
