= When Harvey Met Bob =

- Genre: Biography; Drama; Comedy
- Written by: Joe Dunlop
- Directed by: Nicholas Renton
- Starring: Domhnall Gleeson; Ian Hart; Antonia Campbell-Hughes; Chris Dunlop
- Theme music composer: Queen
- Country of origin: United Kingdom
- Original language: English

Production
- Producer: Catherine Magee
- Cinematography: Owen McPollin
- Editor: Tony Cranstoun
- Running time: 90 minutes
- Production company: Blast! Films

Original release
- Network: BBC Four
- Release: 26 December 2010

When Harvey Met Bob is a 2010 television film, written by Joe Dunlop, dramatising the relationship between musician Bob Geldof and concert promoter Harvey Goldsmith as they organize the massive fundraising concert Live Aid in 1985. Directed by Nicholas Renton, the film stars Domhnall Gleeson as Geldof and Ian Hart as Goldsmith.

The film was first broadcast on 26 December 2010 on BBC Four and later in Sweden the following year.

Critics praised Gleeson's performance as Geldof, but wrote that Geldof's mixed motives and the true toughness of Goldsmith were insufficiently explored.

== Plot ==
In October 1984, rock musician Bob Geldof is appalled by the plight of starving Ethiopians which he sees on television news. He persuades his pop musician friends to record the million-selling charity single "Do They Know It's Christmas?". Determined to stage a massive live concert, Geldof brings in hard-headed rock promoter Harvey Goldsmith who provides a realistic foil to Bob's wish-list of performers. Preparations are fraught with arguments, and Geldof is disappointed to fail to secure Bruce Springsteen. After addressing his old school, and with only five days before the big event, Geldof gets involved with the complicated matters of finance, logistics and co-ordinating international broadcasters. Geldof gets Prince Charles and Princess Diana to attend simply by asking them. Finally the day of the concerts arrives and, as Paul McCartney sings "Let It Be", Harvey and Bob know they have succeeded.

== Cast ==
- Domhnall Gleeson as Bob Geldof
- Ian Hart as Harvey Goldsmith
- Antonia Campbell-Hughes as Marsha Hunt
- Chris Dunlop as Pete Smith
- Paul Rhys as Paul McCartney
- Lesley-Ann Halvey as Paula Yates
- Ingrid Craigie as Margaret Thatcher

== Awards ==
In February 2011 the film picked up two awards at the 8th Irish Film & Television Awards. In the Television Drama category it won "Best Single Drama" and Domhnall Gleeson won an award for "Actor in a Lead Role".
