= Anthony Furlong =

American professional skateboarder (born 1978)

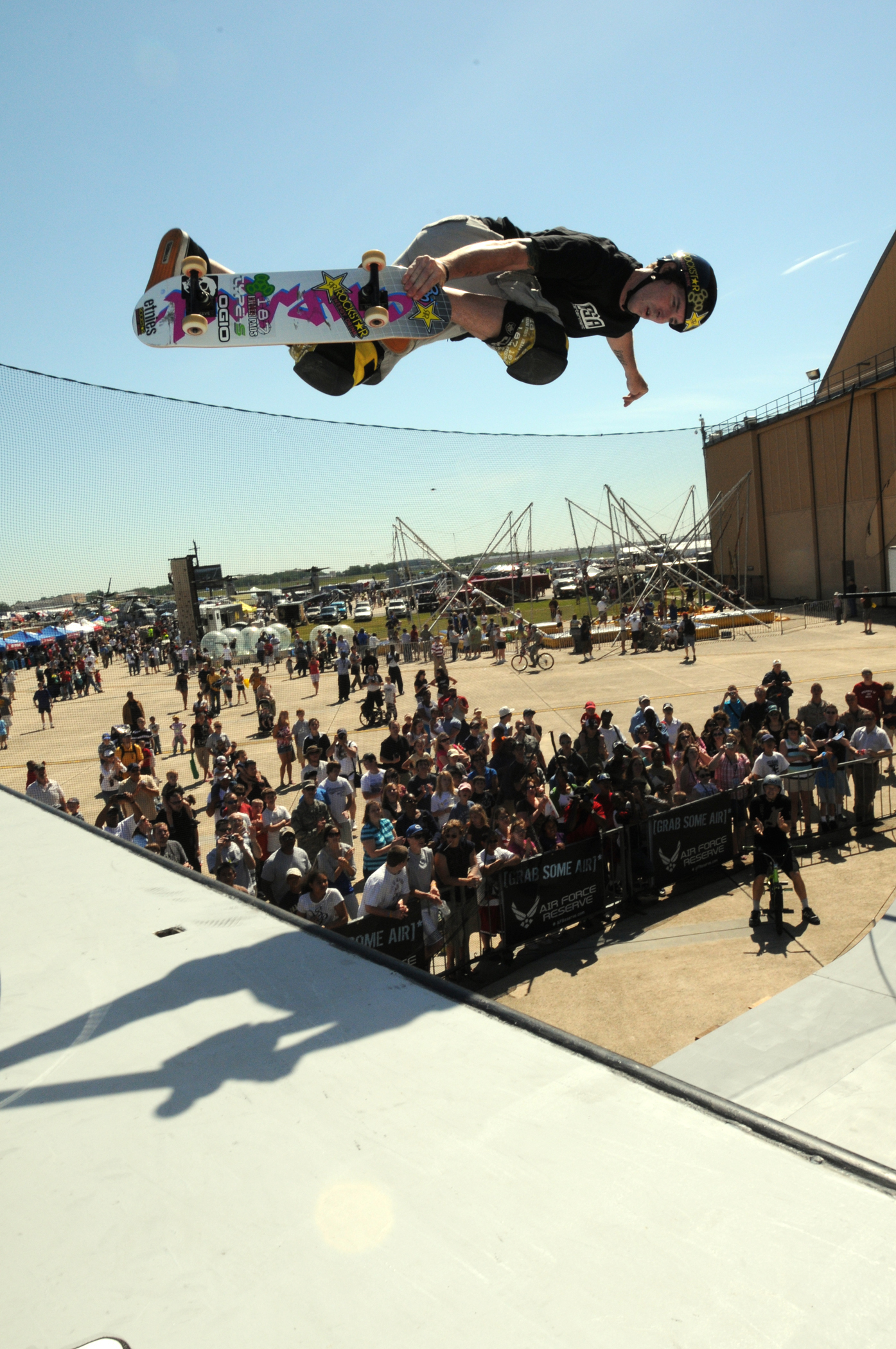
- Anthony Furlong at Joint Base Andrews in 2015
- Born: September 9, 1978 (age 46)
- Occupation: athlete
- Website: twitter.com/AnthonyFurlong

Anthony Furlong is an American professional skateboarder. He has been sponsored by 187 Pads, Triple 8, Skatepark of Tampa, Type S Wheels, Woodward, Ogio, Etnies, and Theeve.

== Amateur years ==
Furlong is known for his talents on vert ramps. Renowned for his style on his board, he made a name for himself throughout the 1990s as one of the best up-and-coming amateur vert skaters. Early in 1998 Furlong moved from Augusta, Georgia, where he grew up from age 6, to Tampa, Florida, to pursue skateboarding as the sport was growing. A few months later Anthony won the prestigious Tampa Am vert competition. Later in the year he attended the Goodwill Games in New York City. While there he won the amateur street and vert competitions. At this same event, he asked one of his idols, Tony Hawk, if he would be his partner in the next days "Pro Doubles contest". To Furlong's surprise, Hawk agreed. Together, they won first place. Though Furlong did not accept the prize money, word spread that he had entered a pro event thus forcing him to move into the professional ranks.

== Professional career ==
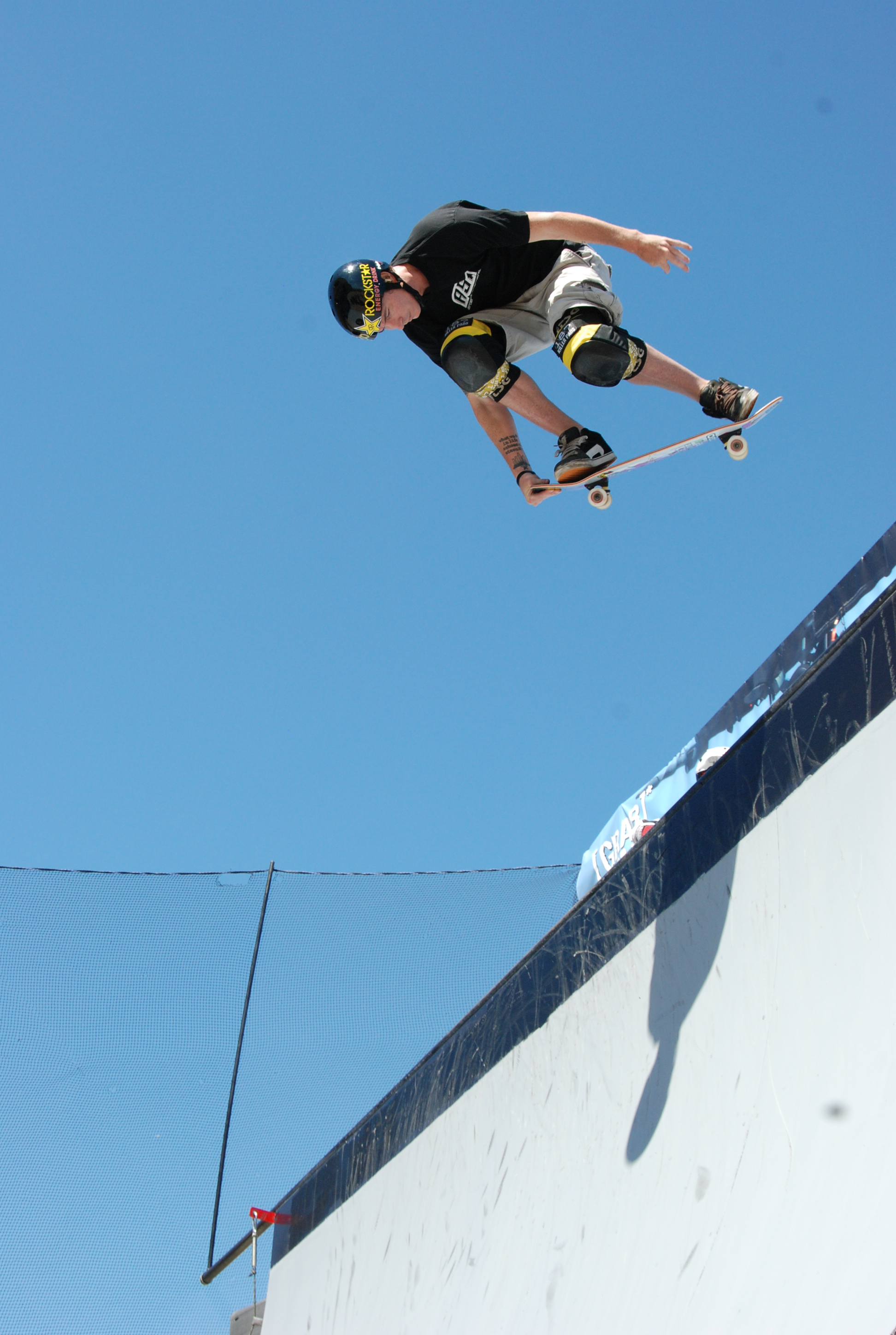
Anthony Furlong at Joint Base Andrews in 2015

Furlong's début as a professional was in 2000. He began the year by placing third behind skateboard legends Bucky Lasek and Bob Burnquist at Tampa Pro. In the summer, Furlong was a member of the inaugural ESPN Tony Hawk Gigantic Skatepark Tour and attended his first X Games in San Francisco. In 2002, he won the Vans Triple Crown Championship. He has been among the top ten competitors at various events featuring vert.
