= John Furlong (academic) =

British educationist, author

- Occupations: Educationist, author, and academic
- Awards: Order of the British Empire, The monarch of the United Kingdom

Academic background
- Education: PhD in Sociology of education
- Alma mater: Enfield College of Technology; City University, London
- Thesis: Social Interaction in the Classroom: a participant observation study of pupils' classroom life (1978)

John Furlong is a British educationist, author, and academic. He is an Emeritus Professor of Education at the University of Oxford, an Emeritus Fellow of Green Templeton College, Oxford, and an adviser to the Welsh government on Initial Teacher Education (ITE). Since 2015, he has been Vice President of the British and Foreign School Society (BFSS), which supports equal educational opportunities for children and young people.

Furlong's sociological research has focused on issues in education including disaffected pupils, the impacts of classroom language on learning, new technologies on learning, and teacher education. He is the editor of eight books and author of further eleven books, including, Education – an Anatomy of the Discipline, Teacher Education in Transition: re-forming professionalism? and a memoir, Islands – in Search of brave new worlds. In addition, he has published over 100 articles, book chapters and reports. He is the recipient of the Order of the British Empire for his services in educational research In 2014, the Oxford Review of Education published a special issue celebrating his lifetime contribution to the sociology of education. and in 2023, his 2003 paper 'BERA at 30; have we come of age?' was chosen by the British Educational Research Journal as one of the 10 best papers of its decade.

Furlong is an elected Fellow of the Academy of Social Sciences and has been a member of Research Excellence Framework (REF) sub-panels in Education in the UK and in Hong Kong.

== Early life and education ==
As he describes in his 2023 memoir Islands; in search of brave new worlds, after graduating, Furlong decided to pursue a career in education rather than business. In 1971, he became a teacher of social studies in an inner London secondary modern school, at the same time enrolling on a PhD programme at City University, London. His thesis, "Social Interaction in the Classroom; a participant observation study of pupils’ classroom life", focused on the lives of Afro-Caribbean teenagers at the school where he taught.

Following his PhD, Furlong undertook two post-doctoral research fellowships as a classroom ethnographer, the first at Manchester University where he focused on the role of language in classroom teaching and the second at Brunel University where he studied disaffected pupils in outer London comprehensive schools. His research on the latter topic contributed to his first single authored book, The Deviant Pupil; sociological perspectives, published in 1985.

== Career ==
Furlong began his academic career as a lecturer in the sociology of education at the University of Cambridge, a position he held for 11 years. During this period, he focused on exploring the social factors that contribute to disaffection from school. In addition, he led two research projects where he examined the contribution of schools to student teachers' professional learning and a national study of changing patterns of provision for teacher education in the 1990s. In 1993, he was appointed a professor and then Head of the Department of Education at Swansea University; in 1995 he joined Bristol University again serving as Head of the Education department. While at Bristol, he led an Economic and Social Research Council (ESRC) funded project exploring the impact of computers on young people's learning at home. In 2000, he moved to Cardiff University as a professor in the newly formed School of Social Sciences. While there he led an ESRC project which analysed the impact of new technologies on adult learning at home.

In 2003, Furlong joined Oxford University as the Director of the Department of Education. He is now an Emeritus Professor of Education at the University of Oxford and an Emeritus Fellow of Green Templeton College.

From 2003 to 2005 he served as President of the British Educational Research Association (BERA). He also chaired the BERA-RSA Inquiry into Research and Teacher Education from 2013 to 2014. In 2014 he was appointed as an Advisor to the Welsh Government on Initial Teacher Education and in 2017 as the Chair of the Teacher Education Accreditation Board for Wales.

== Research ==
Furlong is best known for his work on teacher education and educational research policy. He has authored several books on these topics including his book Education – An Anatomy of the Discipline which was recognized as the best educational research book of the year by the British Society of Educational Studies in 2014. In addition, in 2022, he and colleagues from Oxford were awarded the BERA Public Engagement and Impact Award for the impact of their research on the reform of ITE in Wales.

=== Educational research leadership and policy ===
During his period as president of BERA, Furlong emphasized quality, diversity, and inclusivity in educational research; he later led an ESRC-funded project exploring the issue of quality in applied and practice based research. In his book, Education – An Anatomy of the Discipline he discussed the past and present state of the education discipline in universities and also explored the nature and organisation of educational research. Tickner praised the book in her review, stating that "The author of this compelling book, John Furlong, develops and sustains a thesis that addresses precisely what the title assumes. To do so, he reaches into the history of education to question where we are today and where we may be in the near future…This book makes a significant contribution to relevant education debates that implicate, among others, governments, policymakers, teacher educators, teachers and students. It grapples with difficult issues with detail and firmness and articulates how critical these are for the future of education in a contemporary neoliberal world." In his book, Knowledge and the Study of Education: An International Exploration, he has also explored the construction of education as a field of academic study in different countries around the world.

Furlong's research has also covered the impact of technologies on learning and highlighted how young people acquire computer expertise. He investigated the role of computers at home in creating a new educational environment for young people and explored the way in which learning is associated with the affordance of technology. In addition, he described how child consumers were constructed through public policies and private practices. In his book, Adult Learning in the Digital Age he has explored the dynamic relationship between adults and technology in diverse learning settings in the twenty-first century and recommended ways to use new technologies in a learning society.

=== Teacher education research and policy ===
Furlong has worked on teachers’ education, its nature, its importance and its reform. In his book, Teacher Education in Transition: Re-forming Professionalism? he examined the impact of policy changes across England and Wales in the 1990s. Subsequently, he discussed the changes in teacher education policy during the New Labour government's two terms in office (1997–2010) arguing that the government had moved away from individual professional formation towards direct guidance and notions of collective responsibility. In addition, he has researched and written about the role of mentors and tutors in supporting student teacher learning. In his book, Mentoring Student Teachers: The Growth of Professional Knowledge, he emphasized the need to define the specific responsibilities of teachers when serving as mentors and also suggested that an understanding of teacher learning processes is essential for a mentor.

Furlong has also contributed to a number of policy reviews of initial teacher education (ITE) including national reviews of Wales Brunei, the Republic of Ireland and Northern Ireland. In his second, 2015 review of ITE in Wales entitled "Teaching Tomorrow's Teachers," he presented options for improving initial teacher education based on close collaboration between universities and schools. He was subsequently invited by the Welsh Government to oversee the fundamental reform of the sector in order to establish a new system of teacher education based on those principles.

== Awards and honors ==
- 2003 – Elected Fellow, Academy of Social Sciences
- 2015 – Best educational research book of the year, British Society of Educational Studies
- 2017 – Order of British Empire, The monarch of the United Kingdom
- 2022 – Public Engagement and Impact Award, British Educational Research Association (BERA)
- 2023 – British Educational Research Journal (BERJ) identify Furlong’s 2003 paper ‘BERA at 30; have we come of age?’ as one of the 10 best papers of its decade.

== Bibliography ==
=== Selected books ===
- Mentoring Student Teachers: the growth of professional knowledge (1995) ISBN 978-0-415-11393-9
- Teacher Education in Transition: re-forming professionalism? (2000) ISBN 978-0-335-20040-5
- Screenplay; Children and Computing in the Home (2003) ISBN 978-0-415-29843-8
- Education – An Anatomy of the Discipline: Rescuing the university project? (2013) ISBN 978-0-415-52006-5
- Knowledge and the Study of Education; international perspectives (2017) ISBN 978-1-873927-97-7

=== Selected articles ===
- Furlong, V. J. (1991). Disaffected pupils: reconstructing the sociological perspective. British Journal of Sociology of Education, 12(3), 293–307.
- Facer, K., Furlong, J., Furlong, R., & Sutherland, R. (2001). Constructing the child computer user: From public policy to private practices. British journal of sociology of education, 22(1), 91–108.
- Furlong, J. (2004). BERA at 30. Have we come of age?. British Educational Research Journal, 30(3), 343–358.
- Furlong, J. (2013, January). Globalisation, neoliberalism, and the reform of teacher education in England. In The Educational Forum (Vol. 77, No. 1, pp. 28–50). Taylor & Francis Group.
- Furlong, J., Griffiths, J., Hannigan-Davies, C., Harris, A., & Jones, M. (2021). The reform of initial teacher education in Wales: from vision to reality. Oxford Review of Education, 47(1), 61–78.
