= Domhnall Gleeson =

Irish actor (born 1983)

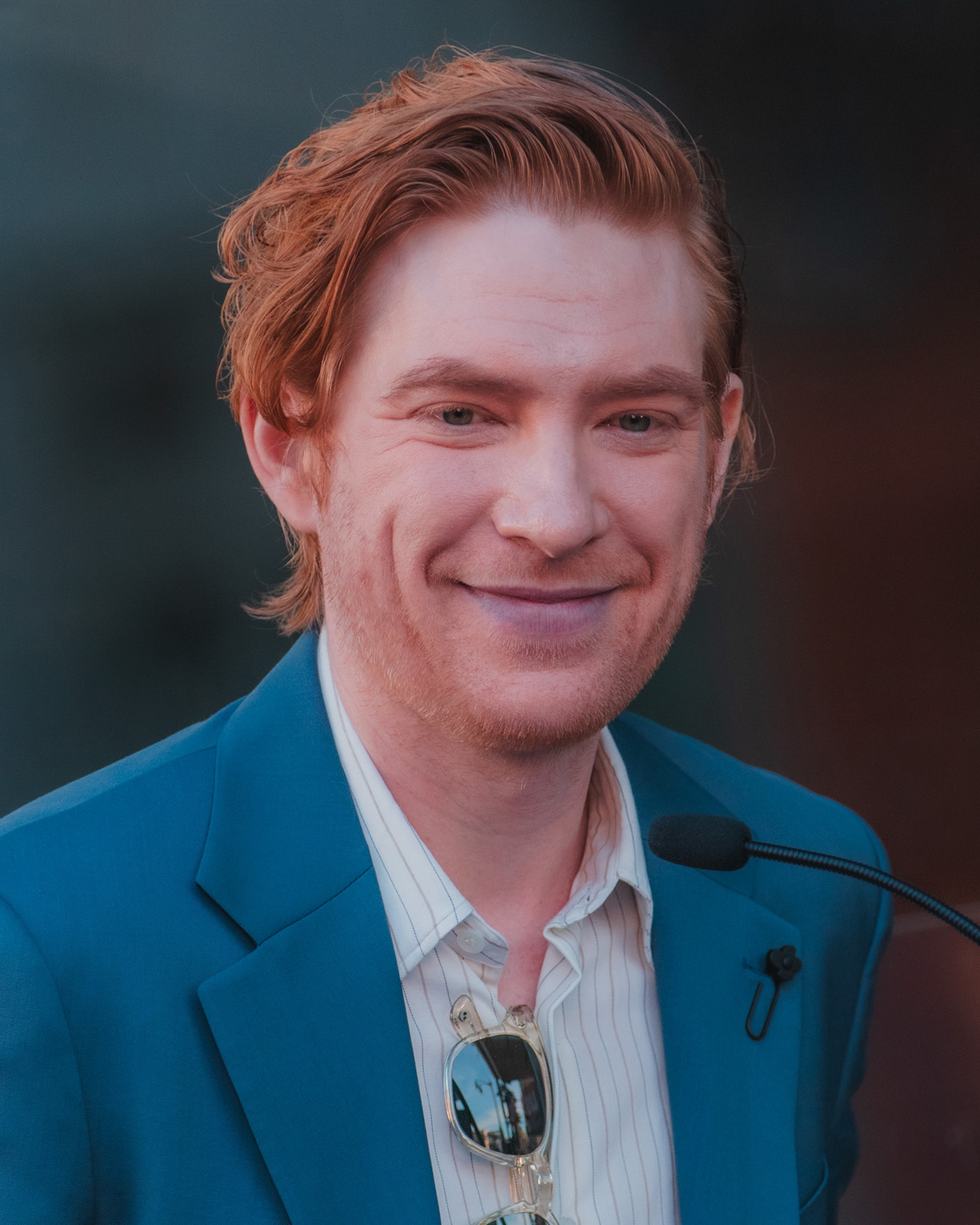
- Gleeson in 2026
- Born: 12 May 1983 (age 43); Dublin, Ireland
- Education: Dublin Institute of Technology (BA)
- Occupations: Actor; screenwriter
- Years active: 2001–present
- Spouse: Juliette Bonass (m. 2023)
- Father: Brendan Gleeson
- Relatives: Brian Gleeson (brother)

Domhnall Gleeson (/ˈdoʊnəl/ DOH-nəl; born 12 May 1983) is an Irish actor, screenwriter and producer. The son of actor Brendan Gleeson, he studied media arts at the Dublin Institute of Technology. He began his career by directing and writing short films, and garnered a Tony Award nomination in 2006 for his role in the Broadway production The Lieutenant of Inishmore. He had a supporting role in Never Let Me Go (2010) and became known to a wider audience for his portrayal of Bill Weasley in the Harry Potter film series (2010–2011).

Gleeson had starring roles in the period drama Anna Karenina (2012), the romantic comedy About Time (2013), the Black Mirror episode "Be Right Back" (2013), and the war drama Unbroken (2014). His career progressed with roles in the films Ex Machina (2014), Brooklyn (2015), The Revenant (2015), and Peter Rabbit (2018), as well as for his role as General Armitage Hux in the Star Wars sequel trilogy (2015–2019). In 2020, he had a main role in the HBO black comedy series Run. In 2023, he received a Golden Globe nomination for his role in the limited series The Patient, and also starred in the satirical political miniseries White House Plumbers. In 2025, he starred as the lead in The Office spinoff series The Paper. He voiced the lead in the short Retirement Plan, which was nominated for an Academy Award in 2026.

== Early life and education ==
Domhnall Gleeson was born on 12 May 1983 in Dublin, Ireland. He was raised in Malahide, County Dublin, the eldest son of Mary (née Weldon) and Brendan Gleeson. He has three brothers: Fergus, Brian (also an actor), and Rory.

He attended Malahide Community School, where he performed in school productions of Grease and King Lear. Gleeson later graduated with a Bachelor of Arts in Media Arts from the Dublin Institute of Technology.

== Career ==
=== 2001–2009: Beginnings and early recognition ===
After graduating, Gleeson began directing and writing for both film and stage. He first appeared in the British television miniseries Rebel Heart in 2001 with James D'Arcy and Paloma Baeza. Gleeson made his film debut in Martin McDonagh's short film Six Shooter in 2004, which starred his father. The film won the Academy Award for Best Live Action Short Film. He was featured in a small role in the 2005 horror comedy Boy Eats Girl. In 2006, Gleeson starred in the feature film Studs, with his father appearing alongside him. He was among the main cast members of RTÉ comedy television series The Last Furlong in 2005. Gleeson appeared on the Broadway theatre show The Lieutenant of Inishmore at age twenty-three, receiving a Tony Award nomination for his role as the dim-witted Davey. In late 2007, Gleeson played Herbert Pocket in the Hugh Leonard adaptation of Charles Dickens's Great Expectations at the Gate Theatre in Dublin. The role was described as being "wittily played" by Irish Independent critic Bruce Arnold. Earlier that year he had a role as Bobby in the David Mamet play American Buffalo, also at the Gate Theatre.

In 2008, Gleeson starred in the one-off RTÉ comedy sketch show Your Bad Self, which was broadcast on 26 December that year and later developed into a series in 2010.

In March 2009, it was confirmed that he had been cast as Bill Weasley in the film Harry Potter and the Deathly Hallows. His father, Brendan, plays Alastor Moody in the series. Gleeson had initially been reluctant to act alongside his father in the same film but later changed his mind. In 2006, he said of his acting: "I'd been very certain about not wanting to do the acting thing because of my father. I thought I'd always have the father-son thing of 'He got you the role'." The 2009 HBO television film A Dog Year starring Jeff Bridges, featured Gleeson as handyman Anthony Armstrong. Also that year, in the film Sensation, Gleeson played the role of a young farmer whose "soulless encounter" with a call-girl "develops into a bittersweet love story".

=== 2010–2014: Career breakthrough ===
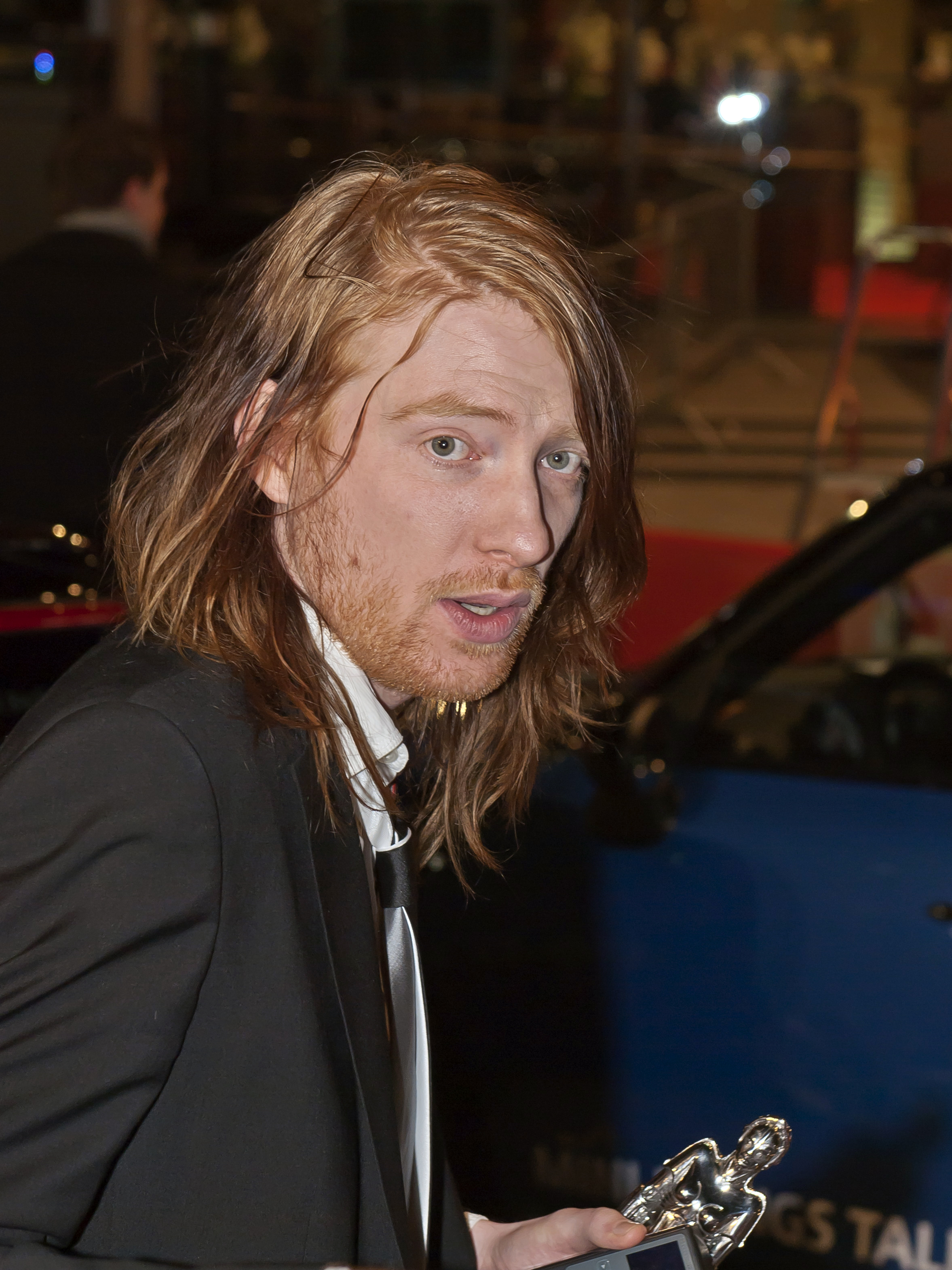
Domhnall Gleeson at the 2011 Berlin International Film Festival

His first release of 2010 was the dystopian romance Never Let Me Go, starring Carey Mulligan, Keira Knightley, and Andrew Garfield. Harry Potter and the Deathly Hallows – Part 1 was released in November 2010, with the Part 2 being released the following July. His portrayal of Bill Weasley, Ron Weasley's older brother, exposed Gleeson to a wider audience. The multi Academy Award nominated Coen Brothers' film True Grit featured Gleeson as Moon, a young outlaw. His short comedy film, Noreen, starring his father and brother, was shown at the Tribeca Film Festival. He portrayed musician Bob Geldof as he organises the 1985 Live Aid concert in the television film When Harvey Met Bob, which was broadcast on BBC Four on 26 December 2010.

Gleeson won the 2011 IFTA Award for Best Actor for his performance in the film.

In the drama Shadow Dancer, released in August 2012, he played an IRA member whose own sister informs on him to the MI5. Gleeson played landowner Kostya Levin in the historical romance Anna Karenina, based on the Leo Tolstoy novel. The Daily Telegraph critic Tim Robey praised his performance, saying Gleeson "nails Levin’s adorable self-seriousness without sentimentalising what can make him hard work." His final release of 2012 was the science fiction action film Dredd starring Karl Urban as the titular Judge Dredd, in which he played an unnamed computer expert working for the gang Dredd battles against.

Gleeson made a guest appearance in "Be Right Back", an episode of the science-fiction anthology series Black Mirror in 2013. Starring alongside Hayley Atwell, he played a man who is killed in a car crash, but returns to his lover as a synthetic android clone of himself. Later in 2013, Gleeson starred in About Time, a romantic comedy written and directed by Richard Curtis. The story follows a young man, played by Gleeson, who uses time travel to win over an American girl, played by Rachel McAdams. Filming took place in London, England, in June 2012. In a largely negative review, Catherine Shaord of The Guardian described Gleeson as a "ginger Hugh Grant", although she noted that "The effect, at first, is unnerving; as About Time marches on, Gleeson's innate charm gleams through and this weird disconnection becomes quite compelling."

In Lenny Abrahamson's Frank (2014), he portrayed Jon, a wannabe musician who joins the band of the eccentric, papier-mâché head-wearing titular character played by Michael Fassbender. Gleeson played a small role as a psychotic killer in the Irish drama Calvary, starring his father as a Catholic priest who visits him in prison. His last release of 2014, was Angelina Jolie's directorial debut, the war film Unbroken. In the film, Gleeson portrayed a soldier lost at sea after a plane crash in the Pacific Ocean during the Second World War. He lost what he described as a "sizable amount of weight" for the role. Along with his father and brother Brian, Gleeson created and stars in the Immatürity For Charity comedy sketches, which raise money for the St. Francis Hospice in Raheny, Dublin. Gleeson directed and starred in a music video for the Squarehead charity single "2025" in 2014, with all proceeds going to Immatürity For Charity.

=== 2015–2019: Leading roles and mainstream films ===
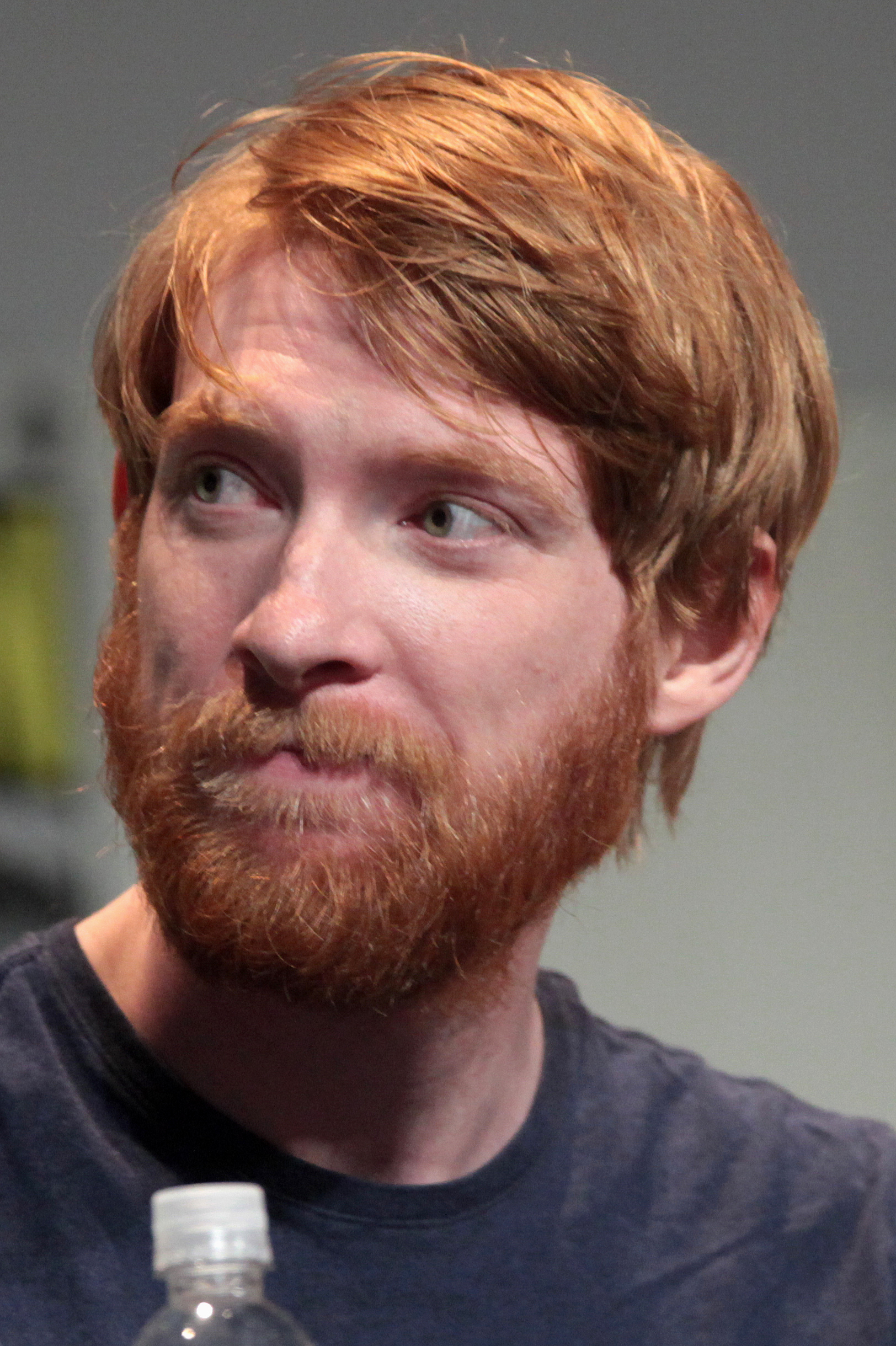
Gleeson at the 2015 San Diego Comic-Con

The year 2015 saw Gleeson appear in four films, all of which received Oscar nominations. His first release of the year was the science fiction psychological thriller Ex Machina, which was filmed at a hotel in Valldalen, Norway in the summer of 2013 and released in January 2015. The film stars Gleeson as a programmer who wins a competition to visit the home of his company's CEO (Oscar Isaac) and test the human qualities of the artificially intelligent humanoid robot Ava, who is played by Alicia Vikander. The film was the directorial debut of Never Let Me Go and Dredd screenwriter Alex Garland and their third collaboration. Ex Machina was met with critical acclaim for its performances, screenplay, direction, and visual effects.

In the romantic period drama Brooklyn, he appeared in a supporting role as a romantic interest of Saoirse Ronan's character, a young Irish woman living in Brooklyn in the 1950s. Gleeson was announced to be a part of the Star Wars sequel trilogy in April 2014. The first installment, Star Wars: The Force Awakens, was released in December 2015. Gleeson plays the ruthless General Hux, commander of the First Order's Starkiller Base. Throughout the film, Hux is vying for power with First Order commander Kylo Ren, who is portrayed by Adam Driver. In his last release of the year, Gleeson co-starred in Alejandro G. Iñárritu's western The Revenant as fur trader Andrew Henry, with Leonardo DiCaprio portraying fur trapper Hugh Glass. Alongside his brother Brian and his father Brendan, Gleeson starred in a revival of the Enda Walsh play The Walworth Farce from January to February 2015. In February 2016, Gleeson narrated the BBC Two nature documentary series Earth's Greatest Spectacles.

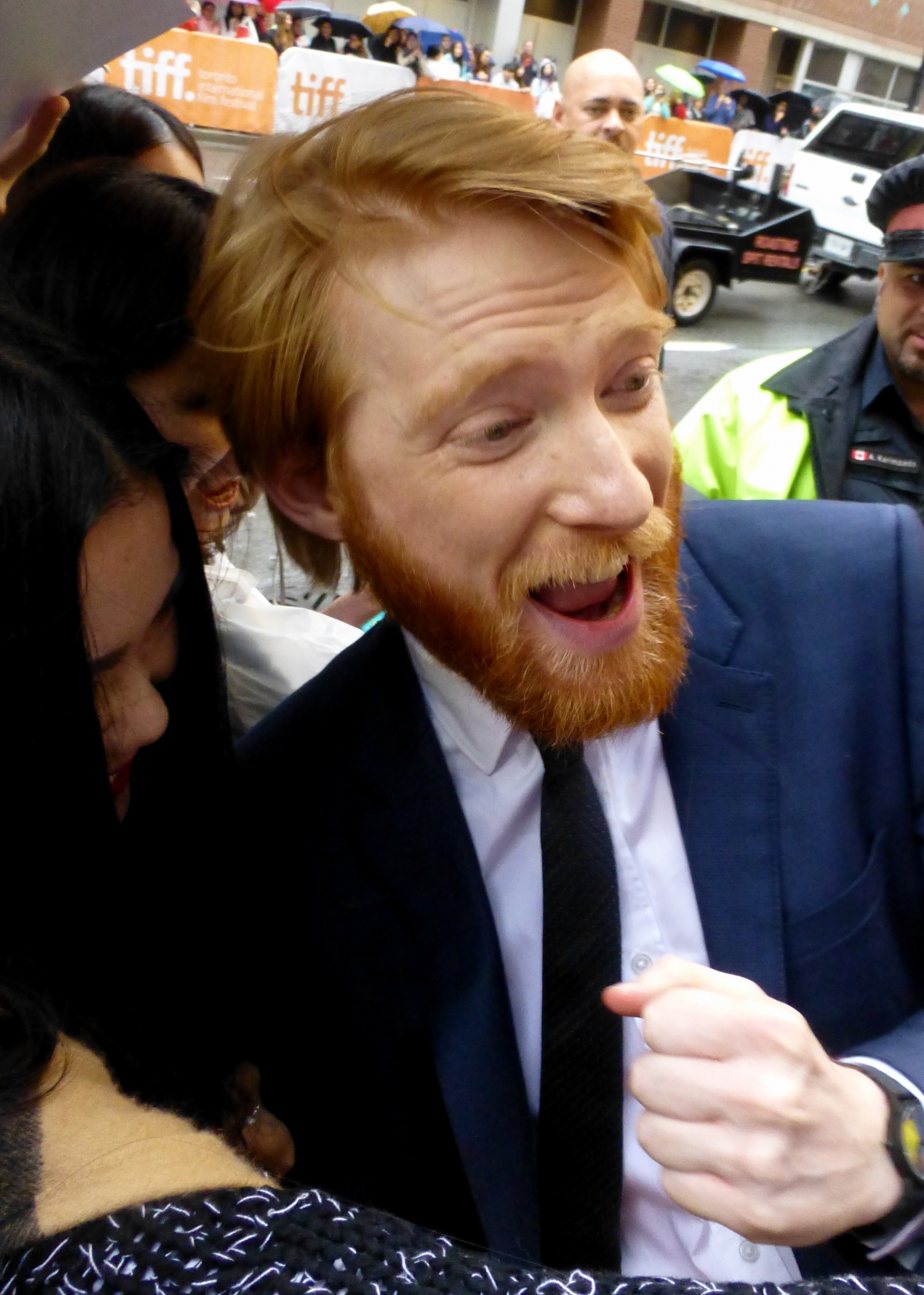
Gleeson at a premiere for Brooklyn in September 2015

Gleeson played fashion house Burberry's founder, Thomas Burberry, in a short Christmas-themed advertisement film for the company in 2016. He made a guest appearance on the Channel 4 sitcom Catastrophe as a recruitment consultant in March 2017. Gleeson then played fictional CIA agent Monty Schafer in American Made, released in September 2017, starring Tom Cruise as drug smuggler Barry Seal. Also in September, Gleeson had a small role in Darren Aronofsky's psychological horror film Mother! in which he shared significant screen time with his brother, starred alongside Christina Applegate and Thomas Haden Church in the independent comedy Crash Pad, and portrayed Winnie-the-Pooh creator A. A. Milne in the biographical film Goodbye Christopher Robin. His portrayal of Milne was deemed as being played a "little too stiffly" by BBC critic Nicholas Barber. Gleeson reprised his role as General Hux in Star Wars: The Last Jedi, released in December 2017.

In his first film of 2018, Gleeson co-starred as National Lampoon magazine co-founder and writer Henry Beard in the biographical comedy A Futile and Stupid Gesture, opposite Will Forte as the magazine's co-founder Doug Kenney. Gleeson next starred in Peter Rabbit (2018) – based on the stories of the character of the same by Beatrix Potter – as Thomas McGregor, the great-grandnephew and heir to Mr. McGregor. The adaptation received a mixed reception from critics, although Deadline Hollywood critic Pete Hammond praised "an appealing Gleeson" for "overcoming the unlikable aspects of Thomas". The film fared better at the box office, grossing over $350 million globally. Gleeson starred alongside his brother and father in the short film Psychic, which was directed by the latter and premiered in 2018 on Sky Arts.

Also in 2018, Gleeson starred in the supernatural thriller The Little Stranger, with Ruth Wilson. The story concerns a country doctor (Gleeson) who takes on a patient living in a possibly haunted old estate, where he falls in love with the owner's youngest daughter (Wilson). It was Gleeson's second collaboration with director Lenny Abrahamson, following Frank. He next featured in a supporting role in the crime drama The Kitchen (2019) as an intense Vietnam War veteran who becomes a hitman for the Irish Mob.

In late 2019, Gleeson returned to the role of General Hux in Star Wars: The Rise of Skywalker, the last film of the nine-movie series.

=== 2020–present: Television roles and theatre ===
The start of a new decade saw Gleeson pivot into television roles. In 2020, he co-starred opposite Merritt Wever in Run, an American comedy thriller television series created by Vicky Jones that premiered on 12 April 2020 on HBO. In July 2020, HBO cancelled the series after one season. He reprised his role as Thomas McGregor in Peter Rabbit 2 (2021). In 2021 he starred in Frank of Ireland, an Irish comedy television series that he co-created with his brother Brian Gleeson and close friend, Michael Moloney. It was co-produced by Sharon Horgan. It premiered in the United Kingdom on Channel 4 on 15 April 2021 and Australia, Canada and the United States on Amazon Prime on 16 April 2021. The series received mixed reviews from critics. Brian Gleeson confirmed in 2022 that the series would not be returning.

Gleeson returned to the theatre in 2021, starring in Enda Walsh's Medicine. It received its world premiere at Edinburgh International Festival in August 2021 prior to its opening at GIAF 2021 in September and New York transfer to St. Ann’s Warehouse in November. Gleeson received acclaim for his performance and was nominated for Best Actor in The Irish Times Theatre Awards.

In 2022, he starred in the FX on Hulu psychological thriller limited series The Patient as Sam Fortner, a serial killer, alongside Steve Carell. He received Golden Globe and Critics Choice nominations for his role in the limited series. In 2023, he continued his work in television by portraying John Dean in the satirical political miniseries White House Plumbers.

In August 2023, it was announced that Gleeson would star in Alice & Jack, a television series made for Channel 4. He is also credited as a co-producer. The series will premiere on PBS Masterpiece on 17 March 2024. The series was released on Channel 4 on 14 February 2024 and received mixed to negative reviews from critics, with praise for Gleeson's acting, but with criticism over the plot and character arc.

Gleeson starred in the music video for "De Selby (Part 2)" by Irish singer song writer, Hozier. The video was filmed in County Wicklow. Gleeson voiced the role of Lawrence in James Acaster's scripted podcast Springleaf. It is presented as a true crime podcast, with the framing device of Springleaf playing wire recordings of his most important case. After its second episode, Springleaf topped the Spotify podcast chart in the UK and Ireland. He also voiced the character of "Boy" in the 2023 animated short story Worry World.

In April 2023, it was confirmed that Gleeson would star in Echo Valley, an American thriller film directed by Michael Pearce, written by Brad Ingelsby, and starring Julianne Moore and Sydney Sweeney. In January 2024 it was announced that Gleeson had joined the cast of Guy Ritchie's Fountain of Youth opposite John Krasinski and Natalie Portman in an undisclosed role.

In February 2026, Gleeson co-starred in the music video for Taylor Swift's "Opalite".

== Recognition ==
Gleeson was listed at number 21 on The Irish Times list of Ireland's greatest film actors.

== Personal life ==
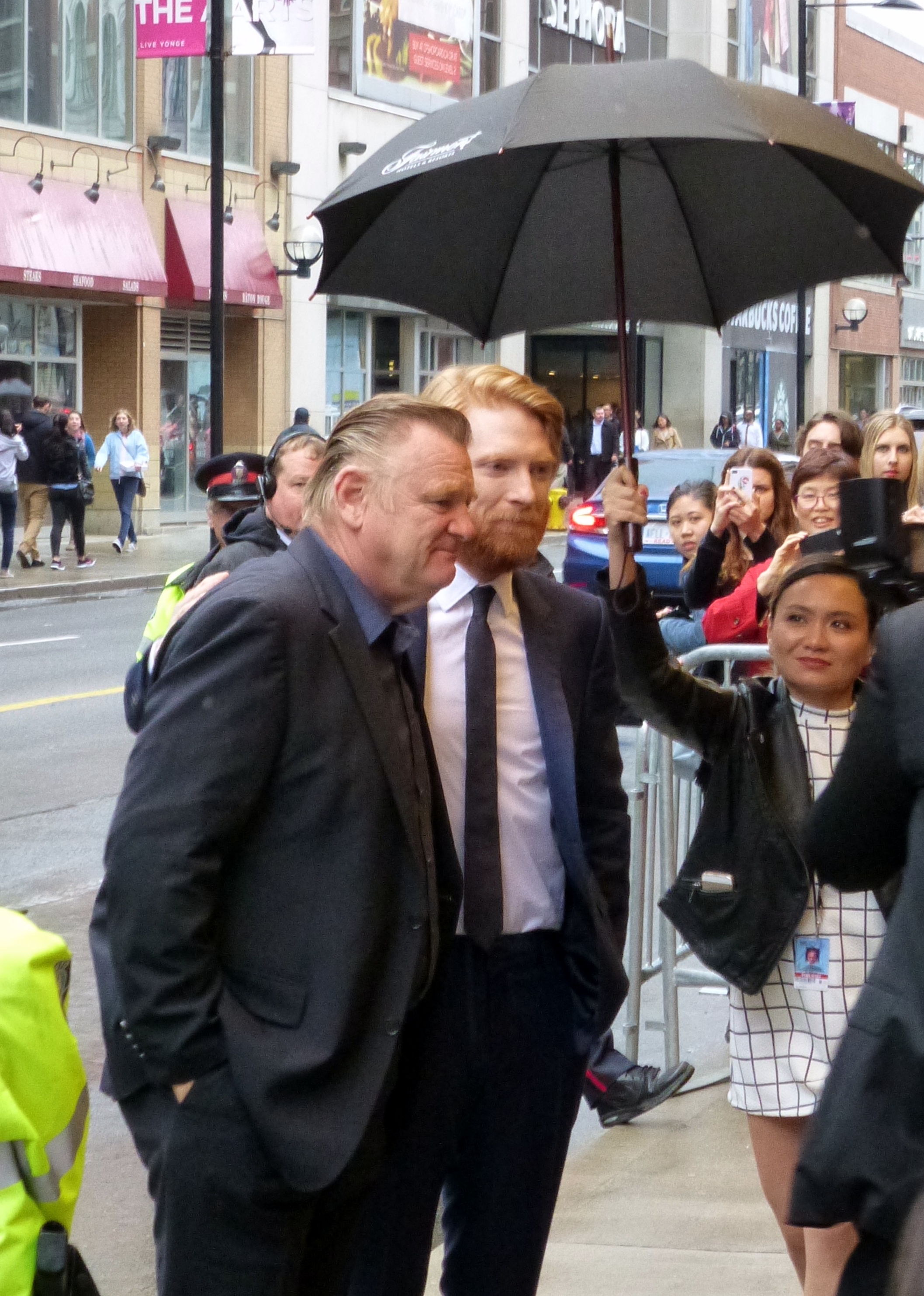
Domhnall with his father Brendan at the Toronto Film Festival 2015

Gleeson has said that it never crossed his mind to change his surname at the beginning of his career to stay out of his father's shadow. His reasoning was that his father was not as well known internationally at that time, and everyone in the Irish film industry already knew of their relationship.

Gleeson met and befriended Irish producer Juliette Bonass while they were in college. In 2023, Gleeson and Bonass married. Gleeson and Bonass have worked together on a number of projects, including Your Bad Self, Immatürity for Charity and Psychic.

Alongside his father, Gleeson is an ambassador for St. Francis Hospice, Dublin, after both his paternal grandparents received end-of-life care in St. Francis Hospice in Raheny. In 2013 Gleeson penned a series of comedy shorts in aid of St. Francis Hospice in Raheny and Blanchardstown, called Immatürity for Charity. The sketches were billed as a “lowbrow comedy fundraiser" and starred Gleeson alongside appearances from his father and brother. The sketches also included Amy Huberman, Laurence Kinlan, Tadhg Murphy, Hugh O'Conor, and others.

He shares a love of the English football team Aston Villa with his father, Brendan. He described the team's FA Cup semifinal win over Liverpool at Wembley Stadium in 2015, as one of the "great days of my life".

As of 2021, Gleeson was residing in Ballsbridge, Dublin.

== Filmography ==
Key
†	Denotes films that have not yet been released

=== Film ===
Year	Title	Role	Notes
2004	Six Shooter	Cashier	Short film
2005	Boy Eats Girl	Bernard	
2005	Stars	Brian (voice)	Short film
2006	Studs	Trampis	
2009	Perrier's Bounty	Clifford	
2009	Corduroy	Mahon	Short film
2010	Never Let Me Go	Rodney	
2010	Sensation	Donal Duggan	
2010	Noreen	None	Short film; writer/director
2010	Harry Potter and the Deathly Hallows – Part 1	Bill Weasley	
2010	True Grit	Moon	
2011	Harry Potter and the Deathly Hallows – Part 2	Bill Weasley	
2012	Shadow Dancer	Connor McVeigh	
2012	Dredd	Clan Techie	
2012	Anna Karenina	Konstantin Levin	
2013	About Time	Tim Lake	
2014	Frank	Jon Burroughs	
2014	Calvary	Freddie Joyce	
2014	Unbroken	Russell Allen Phillips	
2014	Ex Machina	Caleb Smith	
2015	Brooklyn	Jim Farrell	
2015	Star Wars: The Force Awakens	General Hux	
2015	The Revenant	Andrew Henry	
2016	The Tale of Thomas Burberry	Thomas Burberry	Short film
2017	American Made	Monty Schafer	
2017	Mother!	Oldest Son	
2017	Crash Pad	Stensland	
2017	Goodbye Christopher Robin	A. A. Milne	Lead role
2017	Star Wars: The Last Jedi	General Armitage Hux	
2018	A Futile and Stupid Gesture	Henry Beard	
2018	Peter Rabbit	Mr. Jeremy Fisher (voice) / Thomas McGregor	
2018	The Little Stranger	Dr. Faraday	
2019	The Kitchen	Gabriel O'Malley	
2019	Star Wars: The Rise of Skywalker	General Hux	
2021	Peter Rabbit 2: The Runaway	Thomas McGregor	
2024	Retirement Plan	Ray (voice)	Short film
2025	Fountain of Youth	Owen Carver	
2025	Echo Valley	Jackie	
2026	The Incomer	Daniel	
2026	Bucking Fastard	Timothy	

=== Television ===
Year	Title	Role	Notes
2001	Rebel Heart	Byrne	1 episode
2005	The Last Furlong	Sean Flanagan	3 episodes
2009	A Dog Year	Anthony Armstrong	Television film
2010	Your Bad Self	Various	6 episodes; also writer
2010	When Harvey Met Bob	Bob Geldof	Television film
2012	Immatürity for Charity	Various	Fundraiser
2013	Black Mirror	Ash Starmer	Episode: "Be Right Back"
2016	Earth's Greatest Spectacles	Narrator (voice)	3 episodes
2017	Catastrophe	Dan	2 episodes
2018	Psychic	Shergar	Television short film
2019	Star Wars Resistance	General Armitage Hux (voice)	2 episodes; archive audio
2020	Run	Billy Johnson	7 episodes
2021	Frank of Ireland	Doofus MacGiollagan	6 episodes; also writer and producer
2022	The Patient	Sam Fortner	Miniseries
2023	White House Plumbers	John Dean	Miniseries
2024	Alice & Jack	Jack	Miniseries
2025	The Simpsons	Young Joe Quimby Sr. (voice)	Episode: "Sashes to Sashes"
2025–present	The Paper	Ned Sampson	Main role
2025	The Scarecrows' Wedding	Harry O'Hay (voice)	Television film

=== Stage ===
Year	Title	Role	Theatre venue
2001–02	The Lieutenant of Inishmore	Davey	Barbican Centre, London; Garrick Theatre, London
2006	The Lieutenant of Inishmore	Davey	Lyceum Theatre, Broadway
2007	American Buffalo	Bob	Gate Theatre, Dublin
2007	Great Expectations	Herbert Pocket	Gate Theatre, Dublin
2015	The Walworth Farce	Blake	Olympia Theatre, Dublin
2021	Medicine	John Kane	Traverse Theatre, Edinburgh; Galway International Arts Festival, Galway; St. Ann's Warehouse, Brooklyn

=== Audio ===
Year	Title	Role	Notes	Ref.
2021	Off Menu	Himself	Episode 99	
2021	Team Deakins	Himself	Episode 133	
2023	White House Plumbers Podcast	Himself	Episode 5	
2023	Springleaf	Lawrence	Main Cast	

=== Music videos ===
Year	Title	Artist	Ref.
2023	"De Selby (Part 2)"	Hozier	
2026	"Opalite"	Taylor Swift	

=== Video games ===
Year	Title	Voice role	Notes
2016	Lego Star Wars: The Force Awakens	General Armitage Hux	

=== Theme park attractions ===
Year	Title	Role	Venue
2014	Harry Potter and the Escape from Gringotts	Bill Weasley	Universal Studios Florida
2017	Star Tours: The Adventures Continue	General Hux	Disney's Hollywood Studios and Disneyland
2019	Star Wars: Rise of the Resistance	General Hux	Star Wars: Galaxy's Edge (Disney's Hollywood Studios and Disneyland)

== Accolades ==
Year	Award	Category	Work	Result	Ref.
2006	Tony Award	Best Featured Actor in a Play	The Lieutenant of Inishmore	Nominated	
2007	Irish Film and Television Awards	Breakthrough Talent	Studs	Nominated	
2011	Berlin International Film Festival	Shooting Stars Award		Won	
2011	Irish Film and Television Awards	Best Actor in a Lead Role in Television	When Harvey Met Bob	Won	
2011	Tribeca Film Festival	Jury Award: Best Narrative Short	Noreen	Nominated	
2012	British Independent Film Awards	Best Supporting Actor	Shadow Dancer	Nominated	
2012	Hamptons International Film Festival	Breakthrough Performer	Anna Karenina	Won	
2013	Empire Awards	Best Male Newcomer	Anna Karenina	Nominated	
2013	Irish Film and Television Awards	Best Supporting Actor Film	Anna Karenina	Won	
2014	Irish Film and Television Awards	Best Lead Actor – Film	About Time	Nominated	
2015	Irish Film and Television Awards	Best Actor in a Supporting Role – Film	Frank	Won	
2015	Awards Circuit Community Awards	Best Cast Ensemble	Star Wars: The Force Awakens	Nominated	
2015	British Independent Film Awards	Best Supporting Actor	Brooklyn	Nominated	
2016	Irish Film and Television Awards	Best Actor in a Supporting Role – Film	Brooklyn	Nominated	
2016	Irish Film and Television Awards	Best Actor in a Lead Role – Film	Ex Machina	Nominated	
2016	Saturn Award	Best Actor	Ex Machina	Nominated	
2016	Central Ohio Film Critics Association Awards	Best Ensemble	Ex Machina	Nominated	
2016	Central Ohio Film Critics Association Awards	Actor of the Year		Runner-up	
2022	Irish Theatre Awards	Best Actor	Medicine	Nominated	
2022	Peabody Awards	Entertainment	The Patient	Nominated	
2023	Critics' Choice Awards	Best Supporting Actor in a Movie/ Miniseries	The Patient	Nominated	
2023	Golden Globe Awards	Best Supporting Actor – Television	The Patient	Nominated	
