= Leo Furlong =

Florida politician

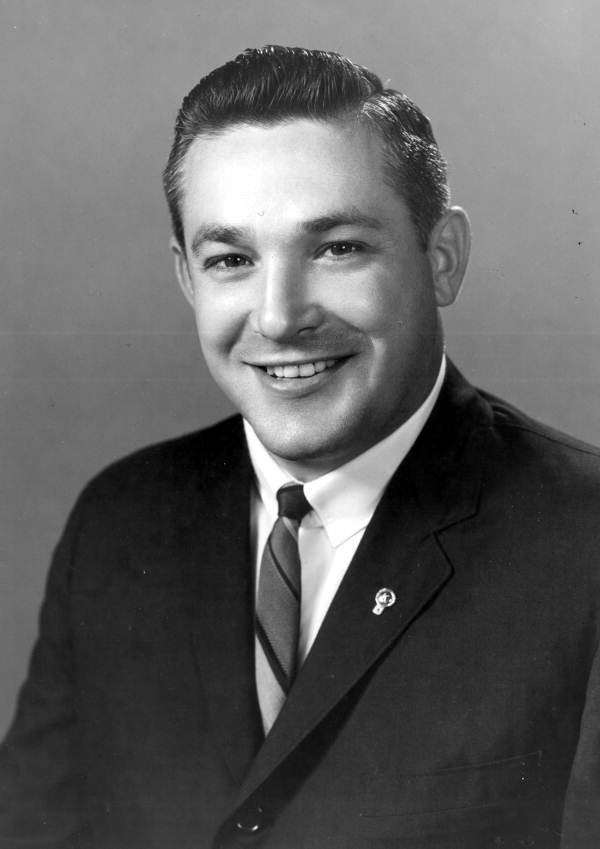

Member of the Florida House of Representatives from the Dade County district
- In office 1963–1965

Personal details
- Born: October 15, 1930 Charleston, South Carolina, U.S.
- Died: June 13, 2009 (aged 78) Asheville, North Carolina, U.S.
- Party: Democratic
- Spouse: Diana McCall Furlong
- Children: four
- Education: University of Miami
- Occupation: real estate manager

Leo Augustine Furlong Jr. (October 15, 1930 – June 13, 2009) was a politician in the American state of Florida. He served in the Florida House of Representatives from 1963 to 1965, representing Dade County.
