= Cathy Furlong =

American statistician

Cathy Ann Furlong is an American statistician active in volunteer work for statistical organizations. She is the former president of Statistics Without Borders, and represents the US in the International Statistical Institute Committee on Women in Statistics.

== Education and career ==
Furlong earned a master's degree in statistics from American University, under the mentorship of Mary W. Gray, who also later encouraged her in her volunteer work. She worked in the public school system as a mathematics and statistics teacher until retiring in 2008, and continues to work as a Medicare and Medicaid fraud investigator for Integrity Management Services, Inc.

== Volunteer work ==
Furlong was the chair of Statistics Without Borders from 2014 to 2018, and continues to serve as its past chair. The organization provides statistical consulting on a volunteer basis, particularly to organizations and countries in the developing world; as of 2015, it had approximately 1400 members.

She is one of three US representatives on the International Statistical Institute Committee on Women in Statistics, and has also been active in the Caucus for Women in Statistics, including serving as its membership coordinator.

== Recognition ==
In 2017 the American Statistical Association elected Furlong as a fellow.
