= Nicola Furlong =

Canadian novelist

Nicola Furlong is a Canadian novelist who lives in Sidney, British Columbia.

== Works ==
- Teed Off! - 1996
- A Hemorrhaging of Souls - 1998
- The Nervous Nephew - 2000
- The Angel's Secret - 2001
- The Unsuitable Suitor - 2001
- No Safe Arbor - 2001
