= Ronald Furlong =

Australian cricketer

Personal information
- Born: 16 May 1936 (age 90); Ballarat, Australia

Domestic team information
- Years: Team
- 1957-1963: Victoria
- Source: Cricinfo, 3 December 2015

Ronald William Furlong (born 16 May 1936) is an Australian former cricketer. He played 31 first-class cricket matches for Victoria between 1957 and 1963.

== See also ==
- List of Victoria first-class cricketers
