= Aaron Henry Furlong =

American jewellery designer (born 1967)

Aaron Henry Furlong (born 1967) is an American jewellery designer.

== Early life and education ==
Furlong was born on November 22, 1967, in Los Angeles, California. He was the first child of a Beverly Hills Jewish family which emigrated from Russia and is the third generation of a family of established jewelers and diamond merchants. His grandfather, a successful diamond merchant, a pillar of the Los Angeles diamond industry, started the family jewelry business. His father extended the business with a shop and began employing craftsmen.

In 1990 he received a degree in psychology and worked at a suicide prevention hotline for one year. Then he decided to join his family business and got a Graduate Gemologist degree from the Gemological Institute of America and also a Bachelor of Arts from the University of California at Davis and returned to Los Angeles.

== Career ==
After graduation Furlong began an 8-year apprenticeship with a master jeweler, Victorino Garcia, a personal jeweler to Ferdinand and Imelda Marcos before they were deposed.

In 1999 Furlong launched his own line and uses gold and platinum mountings with torch and solder in his designs. His designs have been used by California Jewelers Association, World Gold Council, diamond giant De Beers and the Gemological Institute of America. His work has also appeared in Town & Country, Millionaire, Forbes, InStyle, Jewelers Quarterly and Vanity Fair magazines.

Jewelers Quarterly Magazine named him a ‘Designer of the 21st Century’. He is the current President of the Contemporary Design Group and was recently named one of the Top 100 Designers of the Past 30 Years by a National Jeweler poll. He is regarded as one of the top jewellery designers in the world. His family have designed, manufactured and sold high-end jewellery from their Hill Street office tower, located in the heart of Los Angeles considered the Diamond District. He has helped in the creation and production of the 'Circles of Distinction' pins to recognize contributors to the John Wayne Cancer Institute as well as Trophies for the Aspen Institute and pins for the Henry Crown Fellowship Program.

He lives in Santa Monica, California.

== Awards ==
Furlong has received awards from the American Gem Trade Association and De Beers.
