= The Last Furlong =

- Created by: Simon Delaney
- Written by: Simon Delaney & Kieran Carney
- Directed by: Kieran Carney; Tom Hall
- Starring: (listed in closing credits); Simon Delaney; Orla Fitzgerald; Domhnall Gleeson; Christianne Oliveira
- Country of origin: Ireland
- No. of episodes: 6

Production
- Producer: Niamh Fagan
- Running time: 75 minutes per episode

Original release
- Network: RTÉ
- Release: 14 November – 19 December 2005

The Last Furlong is a short-lived Irish comedy-drama television series which was aired on RTÉ from 14 November to 19 December 2005. Originally created by Simon Delaney and co-written with director Kieran Carney, the series dealt with Diogo Bernardo Furlong (Simon Delaney), a Portuguese cabaret singer and songwriter, who travels to Ireland to scatter his mother's ashes over the grave of his Irish father.

== Plot ==
The show centered on a Portuguese man seeking clues regarding his parent. After the death of his mother, Diogo Bernardo Furlong visits Ireland to scatter his mother's ashes on the grave of his father. His father had died some years before in a boating accident on Lough Allen, and he was raised by his mother in Alentejo, Portugal. His only clue to his father's grave is a postcard that his mother gave to him with a picture of a church.

Leaving behind his fiancée Claudia, he arrives in Dublin and is met by an acquaintance and music promoter David Daly (Garrett Keogh). Promising to help Diogo find his father's grave, Daly persuades Diogo to take a musical tour of Ireland with him and his daughter Margaret (Orla Fitzgerald), an aspiring filmmaker who reluctantly agrees to manage Diogo. A backup band is hired and, joined by Margaret's boyfriend John Ford (Simon Keogh) and his friend Sean Flanagan (Domhnall Gleeson), Diogo and The Fandango's begin a tour of Ireland's graveyards and other lesser-known legendary venues, including Ballymore Eustace, Roscommon, Strokestown, Ballaghaderreen, Ballagh and Westport.

== Reception ==
Although Delaney had come off a successful run on the sitcom Bachelors Walk, the series received poor reviews from critics. Delaney's general acting and musical performance were particularly criticized. His portrayal of Diogo, a character he used to perform between takes during Bachelors Walk "just to keep the crew amused", was seen by critics as too similar to his character on Bachelors Walk and in other film and television appearances.
