= Sara Bennett =

British visual effects artist

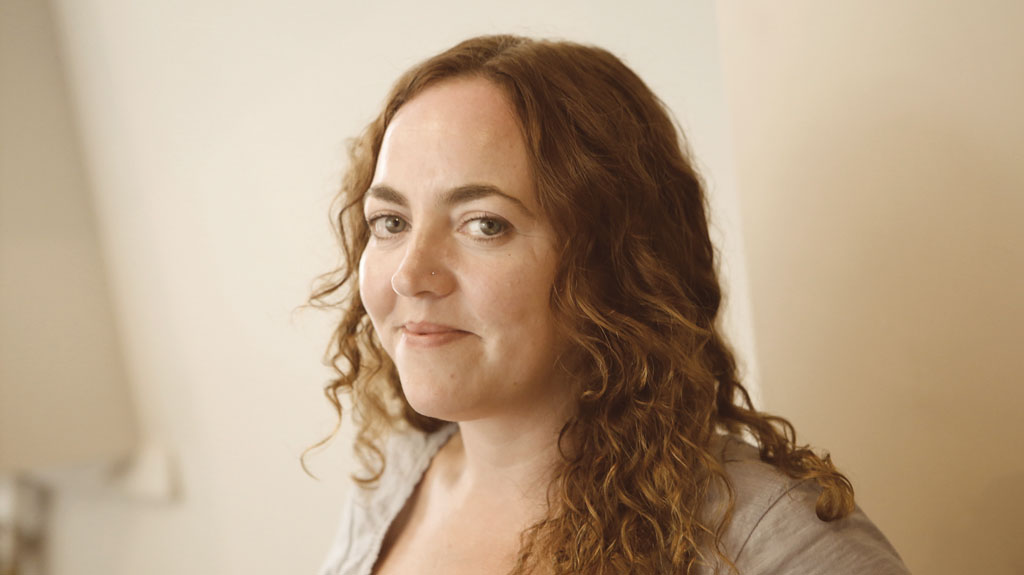
- Occupation: Visual effects artist
- Years active: 1998–present

Sara Bennett is a British visual effects artist who won a 2016 Academy Award for the best visual effects in the film Ex-Machina. She is a co-founder of Milk, a visual effects studio headquartered in London.

== Early life ==
Bennett was born in Worcestershire in the West of England.

== Career ==
From a young age, Sara has been fascinated by the visual effects industry and was particularly inspired by Horror Movies. In a recent Women in VFX interview, she reflects on her journey; from Runner, progressing up the ranks via the compositing route to leadership roles and is now Chief Creative Officer/VFX Supervisor at Milk, a VFX studio she co-founded in 2013 based in London.

Bennett's first film credit was on the 1998 film Babe: Pig in the City where she worked in digital preparation at Mill Film.

Sara is best known for her work on Harry Potter and the Chamber of Secrets (2002), Harry Potter and the Prisoner of Azkaban (2004), Harry Potter and the Goblet of Fire (2005), Doctor Who (2005), Merlin (2008), Jonathan Strange & Mr Norrell (2009), Skellig (2009), The Martian (2015) and Ex Machina (2015).

She became the second ever female VFX Oscar winner when she received a 2016 Academy Award for the best visual effects in Alex Garland’s feature Ex-Machina, along with Andrew Whitehurst, Paul Norris, Mark Ardington. Sara also received a 2016 BAFTA Film Award nomination for Ex-Machina.

Sara has also collaborated with Bythewood on her previous project for Netflix’s The Old Guard, delivering the entire project during lockdown in 2020.

Sara’s TV credits include supervising Merlin (BBC), which won the 2011 BAFTA Television Craft Award for visual effects amongst other awards, and she also was involved in award-winning Doctor Who (BBC), Primeval (ITV). Sara is a member of The Academy of Motion Pictures Arts and Sciences, BAFTA and the Visual Effects Society.

== Filmography ==
- Hannibal (2001)
- Lara Croft: Tomb Raider (2001)
- Band of Brothers: season 1, episode 1 (2001)
- Black Hawk Down (2002)
- The Count of Monte Cristo (2002)
- Veronica Guerin (2003)
- 28 Week Later (2007)
- Torchwood season 1 episode 1-13, season 2 episode 1-13 (2008)
- Merlin season 1 episode 12-13 (2008)
- Demons season 1 episode 1-6 (2009)
- Skellig (2009)'
- Cracks (2009)
- Alice season 1 episode 1-2, The flying scientists, (2010)
- The Chronicles of Narnia: the Voyage of the Dawn Treader (2010)
- Magic Piano (2011)
- Snow White and the Huntsman (2012)
- Dredd (2012)
- The Odd Life of Timothy Green (2012)
- Les Misérable (2012)
- Redemption (2013)
- 47 Ronin (2013)
- Sherlock season 3 episode 0-3 (2013-2014)
- Black Sails season 1 episode 8 (2014)
- Hercules (2014)
- Dracula Untold (2014)
- Get Santa (2014)
- Poltergeist (2015)
- Jonathan Strange & Mr Norrell season 1 episode 5 (2015)
- The Martian (2015)
- High-Rise (2015)
- Beowulf: Return to the Shieldlands season 1 episode 1-12 (2016)
- Fantastic Beast and Where to Find Them (2016)
- Mars season 1 episode 1,3 (2016)
- Assassin’s Creed (2016)
- Kingsman: The Golden Circle (2017)
- Annihilation (2018)
- Alienist season 1 episode 1-5, 7, 8 (2018)
- Adrift (2018)
- The Old Guard (2020)
- The Woman King (2022)
