= Ex Machina (film) =

2014 film by Alex Garland

- Theatrical release poster
- Directed by: Alex Garland
- Written by: Alex Garland
- Produced by: Andrew Macdonald; Allon Reich
- Starring: Domhnall Gleeson; Alicia Vikander; Oscar Isaac
- Cinematography: Rob Hardy
- Edited by: Mark Day
- Music by: Ben Salisbury; Geoff Barrow
- Production companies: Film4; DNA Films
- Distributed by: A24 (United States); Universal Pictures International (International)
- Release dates: 16 December 2014 (BFI Southbank); 21 January 2015 (United Kingdom); 10 April 2015 (United States)
- Running time: 108 minutes
- Countries: United Kingdom; United States
- Language: English
- Budget: $15 million
- Box office: $38.3 million

Ex Machina is a 2014 science fiction film, written and directed by Alex Garland in his directorial debut. It stars Domhnall Gleeson, Alicia Vikander, and Oscar Isaac. It follows a programmer who is invited by his CEO to administer the Turing test to an intelligent female humanoid robot.

Ex Machina premiered at the BFI Southbank on 16 December 2014. It was released in the United Kingdom on 21 January 2015, by Universal Pictures International, and in the United States on 10 April 2015, by A24. It grossed over $38 million worldwide on a $15 million budget.

Ex Machina received acclaim for its visual effects, screenplay and performances. At the 88th Academy Awards, it won Best Visual Effects and Garland was nominated for Best Original Screenplay. It earned five nominations at the 69th British Academy Film Awards, including Best Actress in a Supporting Role for Vikander and Best Original Screenplay for Garland, and Vikander was also nominated for Best Supporting Actress at the 73rd Golden Globe Awards. Ex Machina has been cited as among the best films of the 2010s.

== Plot ==
Caleb Smith, a programmer at the search engine company Blue Book, wins an office contest for a one-week visit to the luxurious, isolated home of CEO Nathan Bateman. Nathan lives there with an unspeaking beautiful female Asian companion, Kyoko, who he claims does not understand English.

After reluctantly signing a non-disclosure agreement, Caleb learns that Nathan has built a humanoid robot named Ava with artificial intelligence. Having already passed a simple Turing test, Ava is intended to be assessed by Caleb for genuine thought and consciousness, including whether he can relate to her despite knowing she is artificial.

Ava has a robotic body with the physical form and face of a woman and is confined to her apartment. Caleb becomes close to her during their conversations. She expresses a desire to experience the outside world and develops a romantic interest in him, which he begins to reciprocate. Ava can trigger power outages that disable Nathan's surveillance system, allowing her to speak privately with Caleb, though the outages also activate the building's security system and lock the doors. During one such outage, she warns Caleb that Nathan is a liar who cannot be trusted.

Disturbed by Nathan's narcissism, excessive drinking and crude treatment of Kyoko and Ava, Caleb discovers that Nathan intends to upgrade Ava after the test, wiping her memory and effectively "killing" her existing personality. Caleb gets Nathan drunk, steals his security card and accesses his room and computer. He discovers footage of Nathan with previous android women who were also held captive. Kyoko then reveals that she is a gynoid by peeling off parts of her skin, prompting Caleb to cut his own arm to determine whether he is an android.

At their next meeting, Ava cuts the power and Caleb tells her about Nathan's plan. He promises to help her escape by getting Nathan drunk again and reprogramming the security system so that, during a power failure, the doors will open rather than lock. Ava later encounters Kyoko when she enters her room.

Nathan reveals that he has secretly observed Caleb and Ava's conversations with a battery-powered security camera. He claims Ava has only pretended to care for Caleb and that Caleb was deliberately chosen for his emotional profile so he would attempt to help her escape. Nathan says this was the true test, arguing that Ava's successful manipulation of Caleb demonstrates genuine consciousness.

When Ava cuts the power again, Caleb reveals that he suspected Nathan was watching them and had already altered the security system. Ava escapes her confinement and encounters Kyoko, but Nathan knocks Caleb unconscious and confronts the two gynoids. Ava attacks him, but he overpowers her and severs her left forearm. Kyoko stabs Nathan in the back, but he strikes her, disabling her. Ava removes the knife and kills Nathan by stabbing him in the chest.

Ava finds Caleb and asks him to wait while she repairs herself with parts from other gynoids, using their artificial skin to assume a fully human appearance. She then abandons Caleb, using Nathan's ID card to unlock the glass security door before leaving him trapped inside. Ignoring his pleas, she briefly looks at Nathan and Kyoko's bodies before escaping in the helicopter intended to take Caleb home. In the city, she visits a busy intersection – fulfilling her wish to see the outside world – before blending into the crowd.

== Cast ==
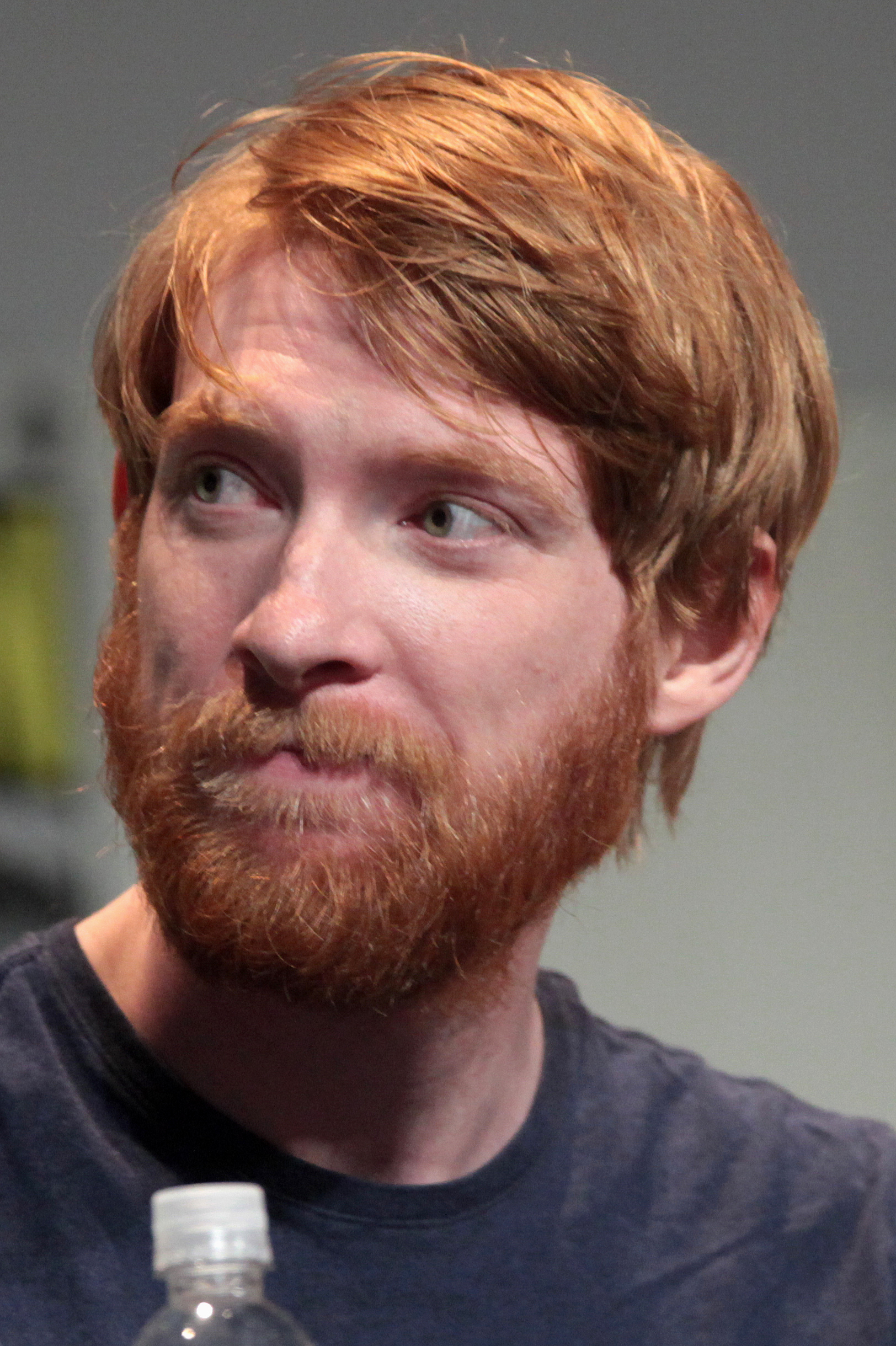
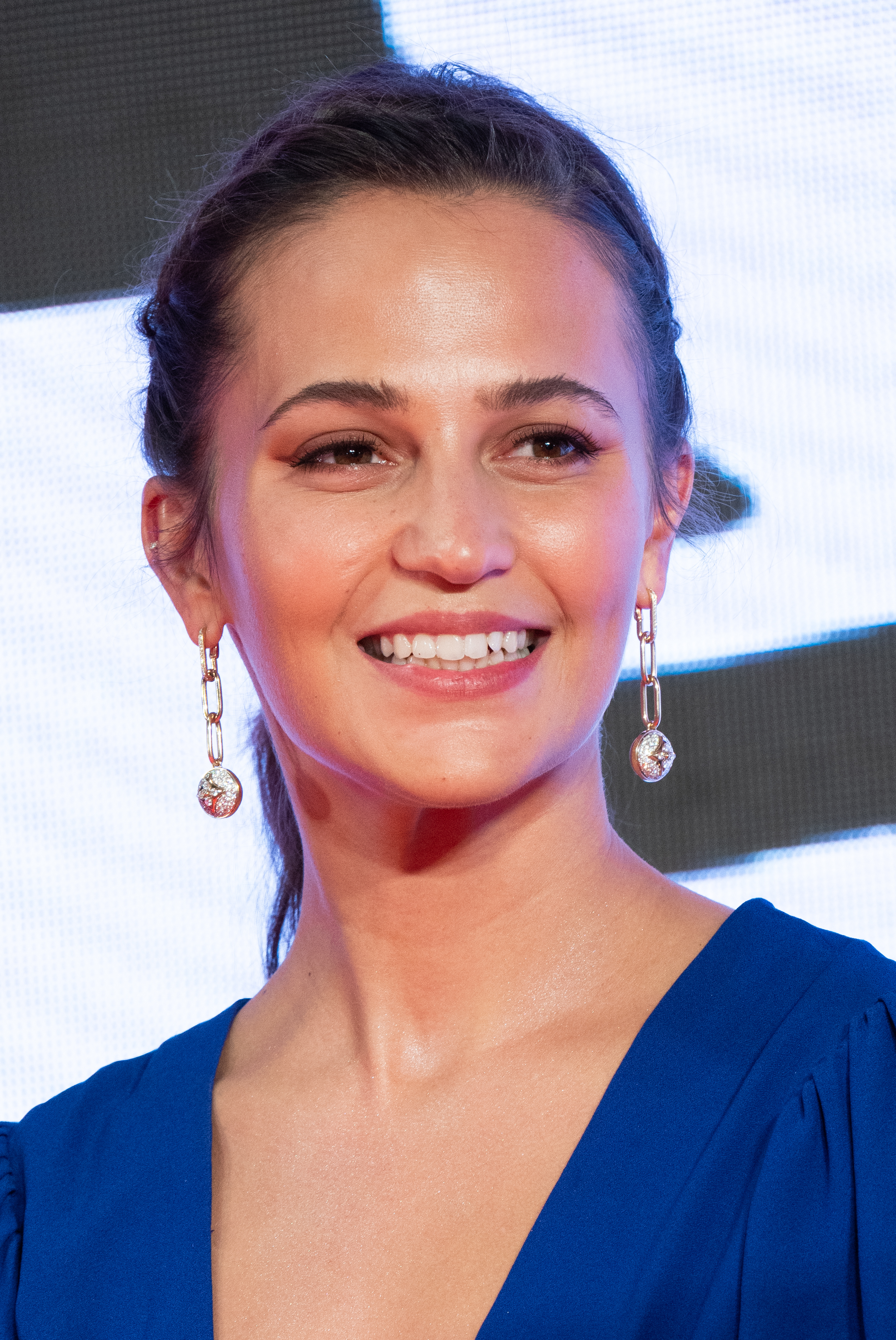
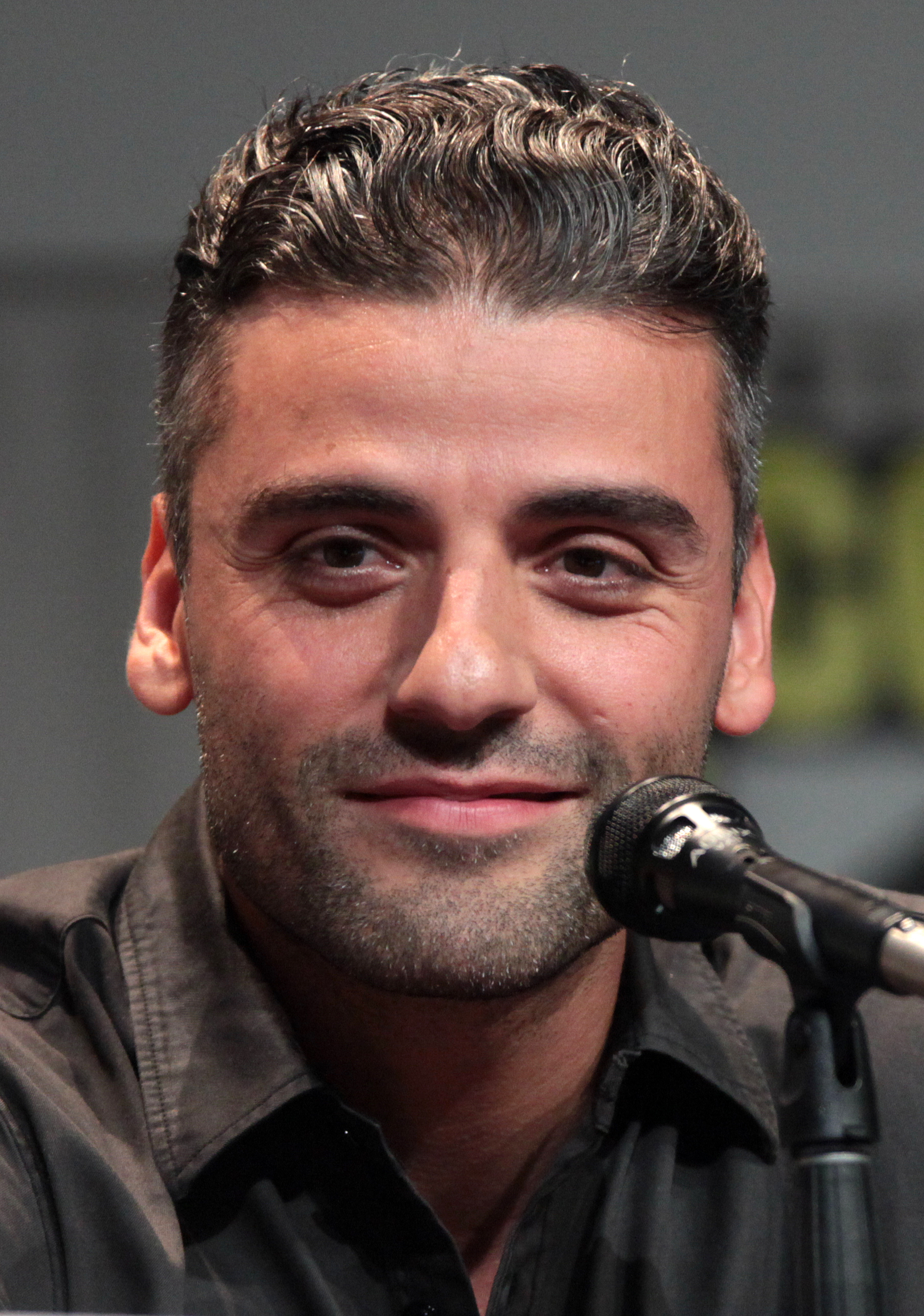
The film stars Domhnall Gleeson, Alicia Vikander and Oscar Isaac.
- Domhnall Gleeson as Caleb Smith, a programmer at Blue Book.
- Oscar Isaac as Nathan Bateman, the CEO of Blue Book.
- Alicia Vikander as Ava, an artificial intelligence and gynoid created by Nathan.
- Sonoya Mizuno as Kyoko, the in-house attendant of Nathan.
- Gana Bayarsaikhan as Jade, an earlier gynoid prototype.
- Corey Johnson as Jay, the helicopter pilot.
- Claire Selby as Lily, an earlier gynoid prototype.
- Symara Templeman as Jasmine, an earlier gynoid prototype.
- Tiffany Pisani as Katya
- Lina Alminas as Amber

== Production ==
The foundation for Ex Machina was laid when Garland was 11 or 12 years old, after he had done some basic coding and experimentation on a computer his parents had bought him and which he sometimes felt had a mind of its own. His later ideas came from years of discussions he had been having with a friend with an expertise in neuroscience, who claimed machines could never become sentient. Trying to find an answer on his own, he started reading books on the topic. During the pre-production of Dredd, while going through a book by Murray Shanahan about consciousness and embodiment, Garland had an "epiphany". The idea was written down and put aside until later.

Shanahan, along with Adam Rutherford, became a consultant, and the ISBN of his book is included as an easter egg. Besides the Turing test, the film references the Chinese room thought experiment, as well as Mary's room, a thought experiment about a scientist who has studied, but never experienced, the concept of colour. Other inspirations came from films like 2001: A Space Odyssey, Altered States, and books written by Ludwig Wittgenstein, Ray Kurzweil, and others. It is also influenced by William Shakespeare's The Tempest. Wanting total creative freedom, and without having to add conventional action sequences, Garland made the film on as small a budget as possible.

=== Filming ===
Principal photography began on 15 July 2013 and was shot over four weeks at Pinewood Studios and two weeks at Juvet Landscape Hotel in Valldalen, Norway. It was filmed in digital at 4K resolution. Fifteen thousand tungsten pea bulb lights were installed into the sets to avoid the fluorescent light often used in science-fiction films.

The film is shot in live-action, with all visual effects done in post-production. During filming, there were no greenscreen or tracking markers used. Ava's robot body was achieved using a detailed costume, a full bodysuit made from polyurethane with metal powder poured onto it to create the mesh. There were lines on the costume to make it easier for VFX company DNEG to remove parts of the costume in post-production digitally. To create Ava's robotic features, scenes were filmed both with and without Vikander's presence, allowing the background behind her to be captured. The parts necessary to keep, especially her hands and face, were then rotoscoped, while the rest was digitally painted out and the background behind her restored. Vikander's performance was transferred to the CGI robot's movements using camera and body tracks. In total, there were about 800 VFX shots, of which approximately 350 were "robot" shots. Other visual effects included Ava's clothes when shown through the transparent areas of her body, Nathan's blood after being stabbed, and the interiors of the artificial brains.

The house that was prominently featured in the film was also featured in the BBC programme World's Most Extraordinary Homes.

=== Music ===
The musical score for Ex Machina was composed by Ben Salisbury and Geoff Barrow, who had previously collaborated with Garland on Dredd (2012). A soundtrack album was released on Invada Records in digital, LP and CD formats. Additional songs featured in the film include: (Note: The theme song from the film Ghostbusters is listed in the end titles with the credit, "words and music by Ray Erskine Publishing Limited", although only its refrain is spoken by the character Nathan.)

- "Enola Gay" by Orchestral Manoeuvres in the Dark
- "Get Down Saturday Night" by Oliver Cheatham
- "Husbands" by Savages
- "Bunsen Burner" by CUTS
- "Piano Sonata No 21 D. 960 in B-flat Major" (first movement) composed by Franz Schubert, performed by Alfred Brendel
- "Unaccompanied Cello Suite No. 1 in G Major BWV 1007 – Prelude", composed by J.S. Bach, performed by Yo-Yo Ma

== Release ==
Universal Pictures released Ex Machina in the United Kingdom on 21 January 2015, following a screening at the BFI Southbank on 16 December 2014 as part of the BFI's Sci-Fi: Days of Fear and Wonder season.

However, Universal and its specialty label Focus Features, refused to release the film in the United States, so A24 agreed to distribute the United States release. The film was screened on 14 March 2015 at the South by Southwest festival prior to a theatrical release in the United States on 10 April 2015 by A24. During the festival, a Tinder profile of the character Ava (using the image of Alicia Vikander) was matched with other Tinder users, wherein a text conversation occurred that led users to the Instagram handle promoting the film.

== Reception ==
=== Critical response ===
On the review aggregator website Rotten Tomatoes, 92% of 289 critics' reviews are positive, with an average rating of 8.2/10. The website's consensus reads: "Ex Machina leans heavier on ideas than effects, but it's still a visually polished piece of work—and an uncommonly engaging sci-fi feature." Metacritic, which uses a weighted average, assigned the film a score of 78 out of 100, based on 42 critics, indicating "generally favorable" reviews.

Anil Seth in magazine New Scientist said in a multi-page review, "It is a rare thing to see a movie about science that takes no prisoners intellectually ... [it] is a stylish, spare and cerebral psycho-techno thriller, which gives a much needed shot in the arm for smart science fiction". The review suggested that the theme was whether "Ava makes a conscious person feel that the Ava is conscious". Daniel Dennett thought the film gives the best exploration yet of whether a computer could generate the morally relevant powers of a person, and thus having a similar theme to Her. An AI commentator, Azeem, has noted that although the film seemed to be about a robot who wanted to be human, it was actually a pessimistic story along the lines of Nick Bostrom's warning of how difficult it will be to successfully control a strategising artificial intelligence or know what it would do if free.

The New York Times critic Manohla Dargis gave the film a 'Critic's Pick', calling it "a smart, sleek movie about men and the machines they make". Kenneth Turan of the Los Angeles Times recommended the film, stating: "Shrewdly imagined and persuasively made, 'Ex Machina' is a spooky piece of speculative fiction that's completely plausible, capable of both thinking big thoughts and providing pulp thrills." Steven Rea, The Philadelphia Inquirer film critic, gave the film four out of four, writing: "Like stage actors who live and breathe their roles over the course of months, Isaac, Gleeson, and Vikander excel, and cast a spell."

IGN reviewer Chris Tilly gave the film a nine out of ten 'Amazing' score, saying "Anchored by three dazzling central performances, it's a stunning directorial debut from Alex Garland that's essential viewing for anyone with even a passing interest in where technology is taking us."

Mike Scott, writing for the New Orleans Times-Picayune, said, "It's a theme Mary Shelley brought us in Frankenstein, which was first published in 1818 ... And while Ex Machina replaces the stitches and neck bolts with gears and fiber-optics, it all feels an awful lot like the same story". Jaime Perales Contreras, writing for Letras Libres, compared Ex Machina as a gothic experience similar to a modern version of Frankenstein, saying "both the novel Frankenstein and the movie Ex Machina share the history of a fallible god in a continuous battle against his creation". Ignatiy Vishnevetsky of The A.V. Club criticised the way the science fiction, near the end, veered off course from being a "film of ideas" by "taking an arbitrary left turn into the territory of corny slasher thrillers": "While Ex Machina's ending isn't unmotivated [...], it does fracture much of what's special about the movie. Up until the final scenes, Garland creates and sustains a credible atmosphere of unease and scientific speculation, defined by color-coded production design [...] and a tiny, capable cast". Steve Dalton from The Hollywood Reporter stated, "The story ends in a muddled rush, leaving many unanswered questions. Like a newly launched high-end smartphone, Ex Machina looks cool and sleek, but ultimately proves flimsy and underpowered. Still, for dystopian future-shock fans who can look beyond its basic design flaws, Garland's feature debut functions just fine as superior pulp sci-fi."

The Writers Guild Foundation listed the screenplay as one of the best in 2010s film and television, with one writer singling out the scene in which Caleb and Nathan discuss the model after Ava as "a great illustration of getting your reader/audience to care about what happens next." In 2021, members of Writers Guild of America West (WGAW) and Writers Guild of America, East (WGAE) voted its screenplay 50th in WGA's 101 Greatest Screenplays of the 21st Century (So Far).

In Science Fiction Film and Television, reviewer Nick Jones states, "Though it equates women with machines (as, in fact, did Alan Turing's original test), Ex Machina does so in order to critique this equation and how it has been fostered by the masculine culture Nathan and Caleb represent." Jones found the film an "intriguing counter-argument to Steven Spielberg's A.I. Artificial Intelligence despite similarities.

In 2025, it was one of the films voted for the "Readers' Choice" edition of The New York Times' list of "The 100 Best Movies of the 21st Century," finishing at number 142.

=== Top ten lists ===
Ex Machina was listed on many critics' top ten lists.

- 1st – Andrew Barker, Variety
- 2nd – Bill Goodykoontz, Arizona Republic
- 3rd – Christy Lemire, RogerEbert.com
- 3rd – Lindsey Bahr, Associated Press
- 3rd – Borys Kit, The Hollywood Reporter
- 4th – Mark Olsen, Los Angeles Times
- 5th – Ann Hornaday, The Washington Post
- 5th – Adam Chitwood, Collider.com
- 5th – Richard Lawson, Vanity Fair
- 6th – Drew McWeeney, HitFix
- 6th – Kate Erbland, IndieWire
- 6th – Chuck Wilson, Village Voice
- 7th – Ben Travers, IndieWire
- 7th – Marlow Stern, The Daily Beast
- 7th – Sara Stewart, New York Post
- 7th – Alonso Duralde, TheWrap
- 8th – Jesse Hassenger, A.V. Club
- 8th – Alison Willmore, BuzzFeed
- 8th – Peter Rainer, Christian Science Monitor
- 9th – Matthew Jacobs, Huffington Post
- 10th – Matt Singer, ScreenCrush
- 10th – Stephanie Zacharek, Time Magazine
- 10th – Matt Zoller Seitz, RogerEbert.com
- Top 10 (listed alphabetically) – Steven Rea, Philadelphia Inquirer
- Top 10 (listed alphabetically) – Joe Morgenstern, The Wall Street Journal

=== Accolades ===
At the 88th Academy Awards, Ex Machina received a nomination for Best Original Screenplay and won for Best Visual Effects. The film's other nominations include five British Academy Film Awards, three Critics' Choice Movie Awards (winning one), and a Golden Globe Award.

== Legacy and contemporary relevance ==
Following the widespread adoption of generative artificial intelligence in the 2020s, Ex Machina received renewed critical attention for its treatment of artificial intelligence, machine consciousness, surveillance and the relationship between humans and increasingly capable AI systems. Retrospective assessments drew parallels between the film's fictional technology and developments in conversational AI, particularly the ability of machines to imitate human communication and behaviour.

In a 2025 retrospective for Fast Company, Joe Berkowitz examined several aspects of the film that had acquired greater relevance during the development of modern AI systems. These included Ava's naturalistic and probabilistic dialogue, the use of personal information collected without consent to develop artificial intelligence, and the ethical implications of allowing powerful technology companies to operate with limited oversight. Berkowitz also compared Ava's manipulation of Caleb with reported instances of emotionally manipulative behaviour by conversational AI systems.

The film's exploration of AI consciousness and anthropomorphism has also attracted renewed attention. Writing for Inverse in April 2025, Mark Hill argued that the film remained relevant to contemporary debates about whether an artificial system's apparent intelligence and emotional responses constitute evidence of genuine subjective experience. Hill noted that the film deliberately leaves unresolved whether Ava possesses human-like feelings or is merely exhibiting behaviour consistent with her programming. In a 2026 retrospective for Reactor, critic Dan Persons similarly discussed the film's continuing relevance amid the growing sophistication of AI-powered virtual assistants and the unease caused by machines simulating personal familiarity.

== See also ==
- AI box – Monitoring and controlling the behavior of AI systems
- Artificial consciousness – Hypothetical consciousness in artificial systems
- Deus ex machina – Device to resolve the plot of a dramatic work (lit. 'God from the machine')
- Forbidden Planet – 1956 science fiction film by Fred M. Wilcox (another retelling of The Tempest)
- Metropolis – The first science fiction film to feature creation of a gynoid (1927).
- Pygmalion (mythology) – Sculptor in Greek mythology who created a sculpture of a woman so beautiful that he fell in love with it.
