= List of British films of 2015 =

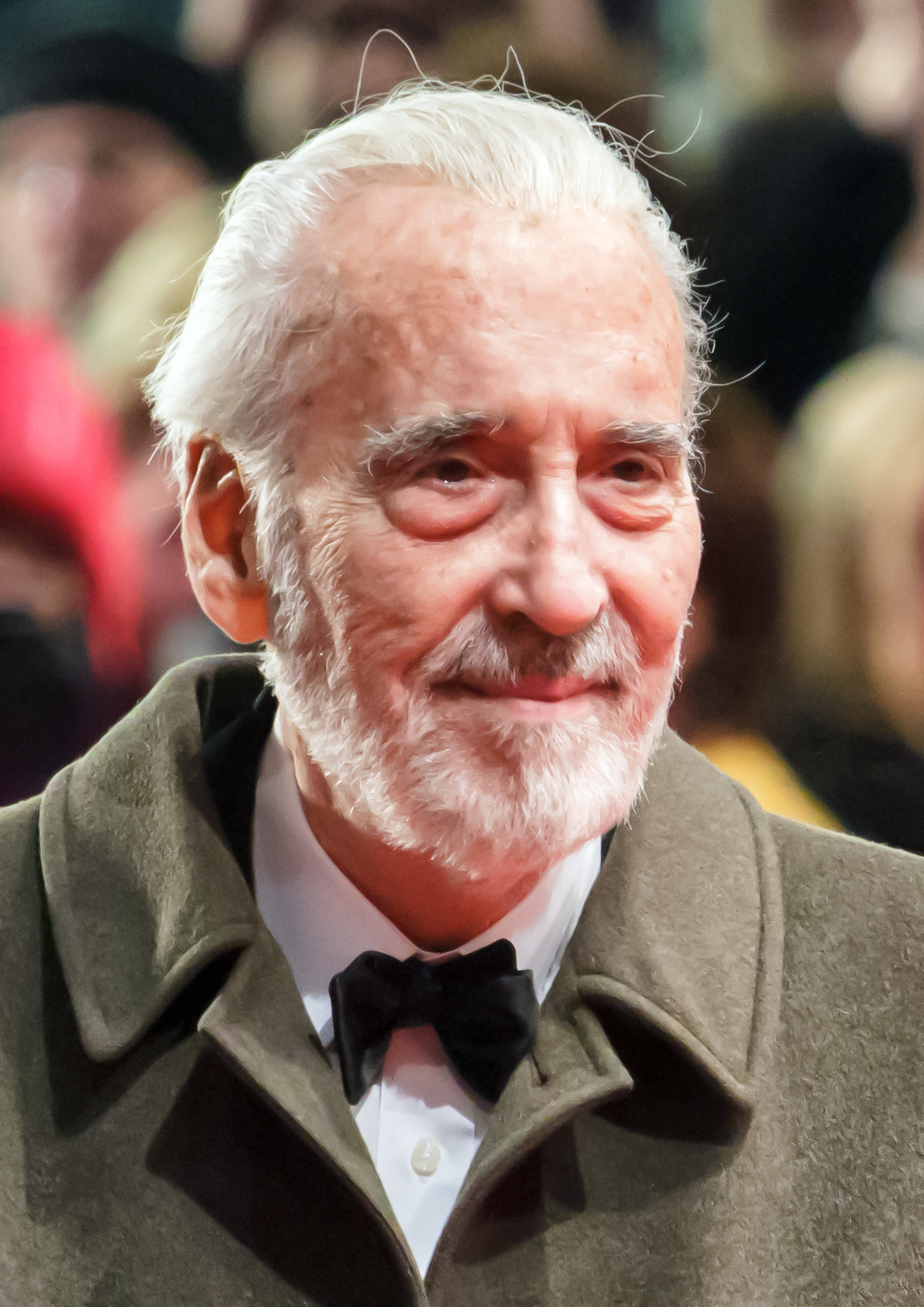
2015 saw the death of Sir Christopher Lee.

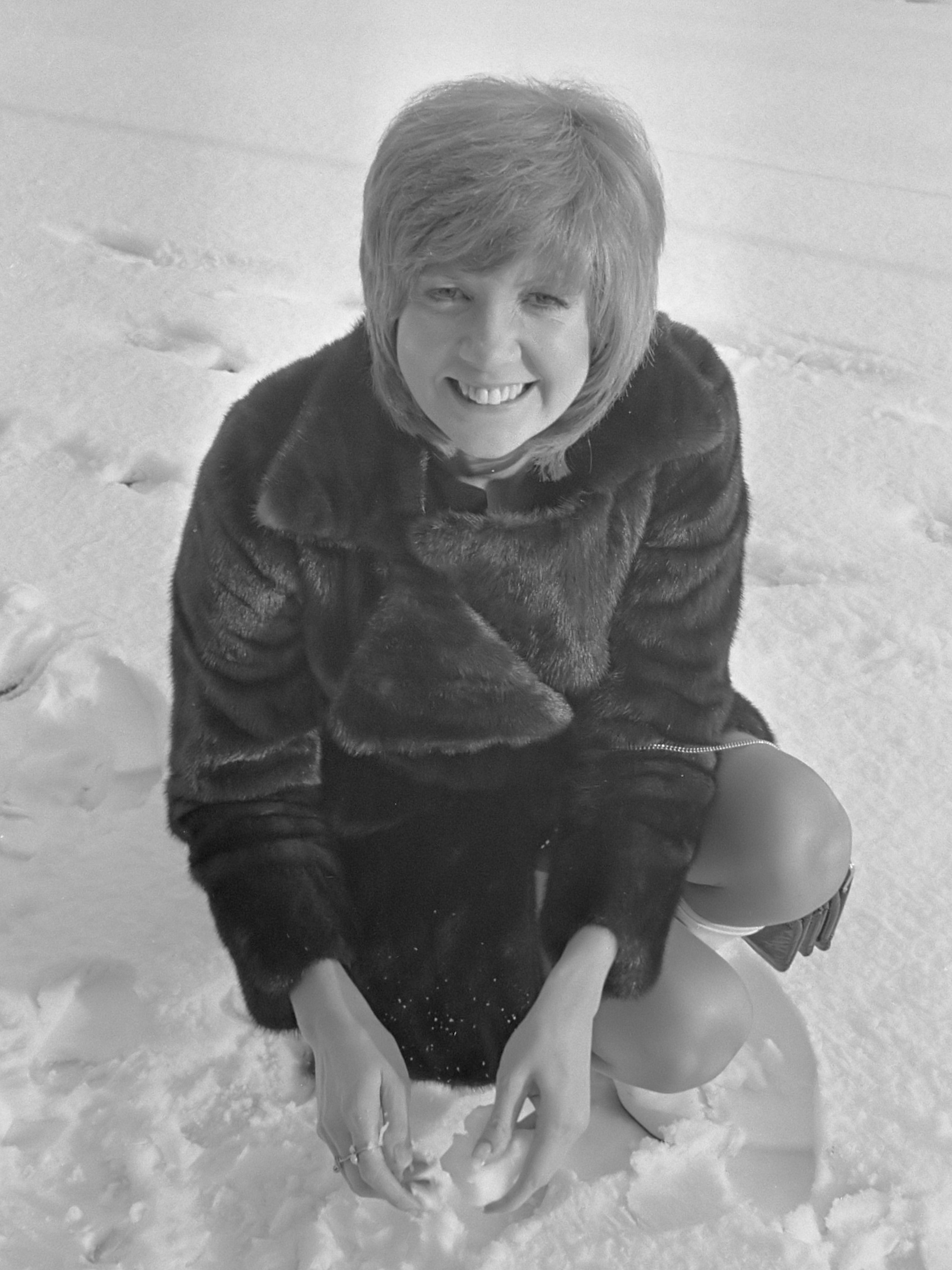
It also saw the death of Cilla Black.

The British film industry produced over fifty major feature films in 2015. This article fully lists all films that have a release date in that year and which were at least partly made by the United Kingdom. It does not include films first released in previous years that had release dates in 2015.
Also included is an overview of the major events in British film, including film festivals and awards ceremonies, as well as lists of those films that have been particularly well received, both critically and financially. The year was particularly notable for a number of box office bombs, such as Jupiter Ascending, Pan, Fantastic Four and Mortdecai.

== Major releases ==
=== January – March ===
Opening		Title	Cast and crew	Details	Genre(s)	Ref.
J A N U A R Y	21	Ex Machina	Director: Alex Garland; Cast: Domhnall Gleeson, Alicia Vikander, Oscar Isaac	Universal Pictures	Science fiction Thriller	
J A N U A R Y	23	Mortdecai	Director: David Koepp; Cast: Johnny Depp, Gwyneth Paltrow, Ewan McGregor, Olivia Munn, Paul Bettany, Jeff Goldblum	Lionsgate; Based on Don't Point that Thing at Me by Kyril Bonfiglioli	Action; Comedy	
J A N U A R Y	23	The D Train	Directors: Jarrad Paul, Andrew Moge; Cast: Jack Black, James Marsden, Kathryn Hahn, Russell Posner, Jeffrey Tambor, Mike White	IFC Films	Comedy; Drama	
J A N U A R Y	24	Shaun the Sheep Movie	Directors: Richard Starzak, Mark Burton; Cast: Justin Fletcher, John Sparkes, Omid Djalili	StudioCanal; Based on the Shaun the Sheep television series	Comedy	
J A N U A R Y	24	Slow West	Director: John Maclean; Cast: Kodi Smit-McPhee, Michael Fassbender, Ben Mendelsohn, Caren Pistorius, Rory McCann, Brooke Williams	Lionsgate UK	Action; Western	
J A N U A R Y	25	The Hallow	Director: Corin Hardy; Cast: Joseph Mawle, Bojana Novakovic, Michael McElhatton, Michael Smiley	Entertainment One	Horror	
J A N U A R Y	26	Brooklyn	Director: John Crowley; Cast: Saoirse Ronan, Emory Cohen, Domhnall Gleeson, Jim Broadbent, Julie Walters, Bronte Kavanagh	Lionsgate; Based on Brooklyn by Colm Tóibín	Drama	
J A N U A R Y	27	Jupiter Ascending	Directors: The Wachowskis; Cast: Channing Tatum, Mila Kunis, Sean Bean, Eddie Redmayne, Douglas Booth	Warner Bros. Pictures	Science fiction	
F E B R U A R Y	6	45 Years	Director: Andrew Haigh; Cast: Charlotte Rampling	Artificial Eye; Based on In Another Country by David Constantine	Drama	
F E B R U A R Y	8	Mr. Holmes	Director: Bill Condon; Cast: Ian McKellen, Colin Starkey, Laura Linney, Hattie Morahan, Hiroyuki Sanada, Patrick Kennedy	Miramax; Based on A Slight Trick of the Mind by Mitch Cullin	Mystery; Crime; Drama	
F E B R U A R Y	9	Fifty Shades of Grey	Director: Sam Taylor-Johnson; Cast: Dakota Johnson, Jamie Dornan, Luke Grimes, Rita Ora, Eloise Mumford	Universal Pictures; Based on Fifty Shades of Grey by E. L. James	Romance; Drama	
F E B R U A R Y	9	Life	Director: Anton Corbijn; Cast: Robert Pattinson, Dane DeHaan, Ben Kingsley, Joel Edgerton	Cinedigm; Based on the life of Dennis Stock	Drama; Biography	
F E B R U A R Y	10	Accidental Love	Director: David O. Russell; Cast: Jessica Biel, Jake Gyllenhaal, Catherine Keener, James Marsden, Tracy Morgan, James Brolin	Millennium Entertainment; Based on Sammy's Hill by Kristin Gore	Comedy	
F E B R U A R Y	26	The Second Best Exotic Marigold Hotel	Director: John Madden; Cast: Judi Dench, Bill Nighy, Maggie Smith, Richard Gere	Fox Searchlight Pictures; Sequel to The Best Exotic Marigold Hotel (2012)	Comedy; Drama	
F E B R U A R Y	27	A Dark Reflection	Director: Tristan Loraine; Cast: Georgina Sutcliffe, Rita Ramnani, Marina Sirtis, Stephen Tompkinson, Mark Dymond, Nicholas Day	Fact Not Fiction Films	Thriller	
M A R C H	13	Cinderella	Director: Kenneth Branagh; Cast: Lily James, Cate Blanchett, Richard Madden, Stellan Skarsgård, Holliday Grainger, Derek Jacobi, Ben Chaplin, Sophie McShera, Hayley Atwell, Helena Bonham Carter	Walt Disney Studios; Based on Cendrillon by Charles Perrault	Fantasy; Romance	
M A R C H	13	Suite Française	Director: Saul Dibb; Cast: Michelle Williams, Kristin Scott Thomas, Matthias Schoenaerts	Entertainment One; Based on Suite française by Irène Némirovsky	Romance; Drama	
M A R C H	14	Nina Forever	Directors: Ben Blaine, Chris Blaine; Cast: Fiona O'Shaughnessy, Abigail Hardingham, Cian Barry	StudioCanal	Horror comedy	
M A R C H	20	The Gunman	Director: Pierre Morel; Cast: Sean Penn, Javier Bardem, Idris Elba, Mark Rylance, Jasmine Trinca, Peter Franzén, Ray Winstone	Open Road Films; Based on The Prone Gunman by Jean-Patrick Manchette	Action; Thriller	

=== April – June ===
Opening		Title	Cast and crew	Details	Genre(s)	Ref.
A P R I L	1	Woman in Gold	Director: Simon Curtis; Cast: Helen Mirren, Ryan Reynolds, Daniel Brühl, Katie Holmes, Tatiana Maslany, Max Irons, Charles Dance, Elizabeth McGovern, Jonathan Pryce	BBC Films; Based on the life of Maria Altmann	Drama	
A P R I L	8	Dark Places	Director: Gilles Paquet-Brenner; Cast: Charlize Theron, Nicholas Hoult, Christina Hendricks, Chloë Grace Moretz, Tye Sheridan, Sterling Jerins, Corey Stoll	A24; Based on Dark Places by Gillian Flynn	Mystery	
A P R I L	11	Molly Moon and the Incredible Book of Hypnotism	Director: Christopher N. Rowley; Cast: Dominic Monaghan, Lesley Manville, Emily Watson, Joan Collins, Raffey Cassidy	ARC Entertainment; Based on Molly Moon's Incredible Book of Hypnotism by Georgia Byng	Adventure; Family; Fantasy	
A P R I L	14	Tale of Tales	Director: Matteo Garrone; Cast: Salma Hayek, Vincent Cassel, Toby Jones, John C. Reilly	Artificial Eye Film Co. Based on the Pentamerone by Giambattista Basile	Dark fantasy	
A P R I L	17	Child 44	Director: Daniel Espinosa; Cast: Tom Hardy, Gary Oldman, Noomi Rapace, Joel Kinnaman, Paddy Considine, Jason Clarke, Vincent Cassel	Lionsgate; Based on Child 44 by Tom Rob Smith	Mystery; Thriller	
A P R I L	17	Far from the Madding Crowd	Director: Thomas Vinterberg; Cast: Carey Mulligan, Matthias Schoenaerts, Michael Sheen, Tom Sturridge, Juno Temple	Fox Searchlight Pictures; Based on Far from the Madding Crowd by Thomas Hardy	Drama; Romance	
A P R I L	18	Kidnapping Freddy Heineken	Director: Daniel Alfredson; Cast: Anthony Hopkins, Sam Worthington, Jim Sturgess, Ryan Kwanten	Alchemy; Based on Kidnapping Freddy Heineken by Peter R. de Vries	Drama; Crime	
A P R I L	19	Man Up	Director: Ben Palmer; Cast: Simon Pegg, Lake Bell	StudioCanal	Romance; Comedy	
A P R I L	24	The Falling	Director: Carol Morley; Cast: Maisie Williams, Florence Pugh	Metrodome UK	Mystery; Drama	
M A Y	8	Spooks: The Greater Good	Director: Bharat Nalluri; Cast: Peter Firth, Kit Harington, Jennifer Ehle, Elyes Gabel	20th Century Fox; Based on the Spooks television series	Thriller	
M A Y	14	A Royal Night Out	Director: Julian Jarrold; Cast: Sarah Gadon, Bel Powley, Jack Reynor, Rupert Everett, Emily Watson, Roger Allam	Lionsgate; Based on the life of Elizabeth II	Comedy; Drama	
M A Y	15	The Lobster	Director: Yorgos Lanthimos; Cast: Colin Farrell, Rachel Weisz	Picturehouse Entertainment	Science fiction Comedy; Drama	
M A Y	16	Amy	Director: Asif Kapadia; Cast: Amy Winehouse, Mitchell Winehouse, Janis Winehouse, Blake Fielder-Civil, Raye Cosbert, Nick Schymansky, Tyler James, Juliette Ashby, Lauren Gilbert, Mark Ronson, Salaam Remi, Tony Bennett	Altitude Film Distribution; Based on the life of Amy Winehouse	Documentary	
M A Y	17	Carol	Director: Todd Haynes; Cast: Cate Blanchett, Rooney Mara, Sarah Paulson, Kyle Chandler	StudioCanal; Based on The Price of Salt by Patricia Highsmith	Romance; Drama	
M A Y	23	Macbeth	Director: Justin Kurzel; Cast: Michael Fassbender, Marion Cotillard, Sean Harris, Elizabeth Debicki, Paddy Considine, David Thewlis	The Weinstein Company; Based on Macbeth by William Shakespeare	Drama; Historical	
M A Y	29	Survivor	Director: James McTeigue; Cast: Milla Jovovich, Pierce Brosnan, Dylan McDermott, Angela Bassett, Robert Forster	Millennium Films	Thriller	
J U N E	9	A Syrian Love Story	Director: Sean McAllister		Documentary	
J U N E	11	The Martian	Director: Ridley Scott; Cast: Matt Damon, Jessica Chastain, Kristen Wiig, Jeff Daniels, Michael Peña, Kate Mara, Sean Bean, Sebastian Stan, Aksel Hennie, Chiwetel Ejiofor	20th Century Fox; Based on The Martian by Andy Weir	Science fiction	
J U N E	12	London Road	Director: Rufus Norris; Cast: Tom Hardy, Olivia Colman	Picturehouse Entertainment; Based on London Road Alecky Blythe and Adam Cork	Musical; Mystery; Thriller	
J U N E	17	The Legend of Barney Thomson	Director: Robert Carlyle; Cast: Robert Carlyle, Emma Thompson, Ashley Jensen, Ray Winstone	Based on The Long Midnight of Barney Thomson by Douglas Lindsay	Comedy; Thriller	
J U N E	20	The Messenger	Director: David Blair; Cast: Robert Sheehan, Lily Cole	Metrodome Distribution	Horror; Mystery; Thriller	
J U N E	20	Under Milk Wood	Director: Kevin Allen; Cast: Rhys Ifans	Based on Under Milk Wood by Dylan Thomas	Drama	
J U N E	23	Everest	Director: Baltasar Kormákur; Cast: Jason Clarke, Josh Brolin, John Hawkes, Robin Wright, Emily Watson, Keira Knightley, Sam Worthington, Jake Gyllenhaal	Universal Pictures; Based on the 1996 Mount Everest expedition	Thriller	

=== July – September ===
Opening		Title	Cast and crew	Details	Genre(s)	Ref.
J U L Y	17	Thomas & Friends: Sodor's Legend of the Lost Treasure	Director: David Stoten; Cast: Joseph May, John Hasler, Jamie Campbell Bower, John Hurt, Eddie Redmayne, Keith Wickham, Olivia Colman	HiT Entertainment; Based on Thomas & Friends	CGI animated Children's epic Fantasy Adventure Action-Musical	
J U L Y	27	Thomas & Friends: The Adventure Begins	Director: Don Spencer; Cast: Joseph May, John Hasler, Christopher Ragland, Teresa Gallagher, Tim Whitnall, Keith Wickham	HiT Entertainment; Based on Thomas & Friends	CGI animated	
A U G U S T	4	Fantastic Four	Director: Josh Trank; Cast: Miles Teller, Michael B. Jordan, Kate Mara, Jamie Bell, Toby Kebbell, Reg E. Cathey Tim Blake Nelson	20th Century Fox; Based on the Fantastic Four by Stan Lee and Jack Kirby	Superhero	
A U G U S T	7	The Man from U.N.C.L.E.	Director: Guy Ritchie; Cast: Henry Cavill, Armie Hammer, Alicia Vikander, Elizabeth Debicki, Jared Harris, Hugh Grant	Warner Bros. Pictures; Based on The Man from U.N.C.L.E. television series	action comedy	
A U G U S T	8	Soldiers of the Damned	Director: Mark Nuttall; Cast: Gil Darnell; Miriam Cooke; Lucas Hansen	Safecracker Pictures	Horror	
A U G U S T	13	Hitman: Agent 47	Director: Aleksander Bach; Cast: Rupert Friend, Hannah Ware, Zachary Quinto, Ciarán Hinds	20th Century Fox	Action-thriller; Based on the Hitman video game series by IO Interactive	
A U G U S T	14	Absolutely Anything	Director: Terry Jones; Cast: Simon Pegg, Kate Beckinsale, Michael Palin, Terry Jones, Terry Gilliam, John Cleese, Eric Idle, Robin Williams	Lionsgate UK	Comedy; Science fiction	
A U G U S T	21	A Dozen Summers	Director: Kenton Hall; Cast: Scarlet Hall, Hero Hall, Colin Baker, Ewen MacIntosh, Sarah Warren, Kenton Hall	Ballpark Film Distributors	Comedy	
A U G U S T	21	Sinister 2	Director: Ciaran Foy; Cast: James Ransone, Shannyn Sossamon	Gramercy Pictures; Sequel to Sinister (2012)	Horror	
A U G U S T	21	The Bad Education Movie	Director: Elliot Hegarty; Cast: Jack Whitehall, Mathew Horne, Sarah Solemani, Harry Enfield, Nikki Runeckles, Kae Alexander, Ethan Lawrence, Charlie Wernham, Jack Binstead, Layton Williams, Weruche Opia, Iain Glen	Entertainment Film Distributors; Based on the Bad Education television series	Comedy	
We Are Your Friends	21	Director: Max Joseph; Cast: Zac Efron, Emily Ratajkowski, Shiloh Fernandez, Alex Shaffer, Jonny Weston, Wes Bentley	Warner Bros. Pictures	Musical; Drama		
S E P T E M B E R	4	Black Mass	Director: Scott Cooper; Cast: Johnny Depp, Joel Edgerton, Benedict Cumberbatch, Rory Cochrane, Kevin Bacon, Jesse Plemons, Corey Stoll, Peter Sarsgaard, Dakota Johnson	Warner Bros. Pictures; Based on Black Mass: The True Story of an Unholy Alliance Between the FBI and the Irish Mob by Dick Lehr and Gerard O'Neill	Crime; Drama	
S E P T E M B E R	4	Suffragette	Director: Sarah Gavron; Cast: Carey Mulligan, Meryl Streep, Helena Bonham Carter, Ben Whishaw, Brendan Gleeson, Romola Garai	Focus Features; Based on the women's suffrage movement	Drama; Historical	
S E P T E M B E R	5	The Childhood of a Leader	Director: Brady Corbet; Cast: Bérénice Bejo, Liam Cunningham, Stacy Martin, Robert Pattinson, Tom Sweet	IFC Films; Based on The Childhood of a Leader by Jean-Paul Sartre and The Magus by John Fowles	Historical; Mystery; Drama	
S E P T E M B E R	5	The Danish Girl	Director: Tom Hooper; Cast: Eddie Redmayne, Alicia Vikander, Ben Whishaw, Sebastian Koch, Amber Heard, Matthias Schoenaerts	Focus Features; Based on The Danish Girl by David Ebershoff	Biography; Drama	
S E P T E M B E R	9	Legend	Director: Brian Helgeland; Cast: Tom Hardy, Emily Browning, Colin Morgan	Universal Pictures; Based on The Profession of Violence by John Pearson	Biography; Thriller; Crime; Comedy	
S E P T E M B E R	11	Eye in the Sky	Director: Gavin Hood; Cast: Helen Mirren, Aaron Paul, Alan Rickman, Barkhad Abdi	Entertainment One	Thriller	
S E P T E M B E R	12	Miss You Already	Director: Catherine Hardwicke; Cast: Toni Collette, Drew Barrymore, Dominic Cooper, Paddy Considine, Tyson Ritter, Frances de la Tour, Jacqueline Bisset	Entertainment One	Comedy; Drama	
S E P T E M B E R	12	The Lady in the Van	Director: Nicholas Hytner; Cast: Maggie Smith, Alex Jennings, Frances de la Tour	Based on The Lady in the Van by Alan Bennett	Drama; Comedy	
S E P T E M B E R	13	High-Rise	Director: Ben Wheatley; Cast: Tom Hiddleston, Jeremy Irons, Sienna Miller, Luke Evans	StudioCanal; Based on High Rise by J. G. Ballard	Dystopian drama	
S E P T E M B E R	13	The Ones Below	Director: David Farr; Cast: Clémence Poésy, David Morrissey, Stephen Campbell Moore, Laura Birn, Deborah Findlay	Icon Film Distribution	Thriller	
S E P T E M B E R	13	Sunset Song	Director: Terence Davies; Cast: Agyness Deyn, Peter Mullan, Kevin Guthrie	Based on Sunset Song by Lewis Grassic Gibbon	Drama	
S E P T E M B E R	14	The Program	Director: Stephen Frears; Cast: Ben Foster, Chris O'Dowd, Guillaume Canet, Jesse Plemons, Lee Pace, Denis Ménochet, Dustin Hoffman	StudioCanal; Based on Seven Deadly Sins by David Walsh	Biography; Drama	
S E P T E M B E R	17	The Man Who Knew Infinity	Director: Matthew Brown; Cast: Dev Patel, Jeremy Irons	Warner Bros. Based on The Man Who Knew Infinity by Robert Kanigel	Biography; Drama	
S E P T E M B E R	18	Bill	Director: Richard Bracewell; Cast: Mathew Baynton, Simon Farnaby, Martha Howe-Douglas, Jim Howick, Laurence Rickard, Ben Willbond	Vertigo Films; Based on the Horrible Histories television series	Comedy	
S E P T E M B E R	20	Pan	Director: Joe Wright; Cast: Hugh Jackman, Garrett Hedlund, Rooney Mara, Amanda Seyfried	Warner Bros. Pictures; Based on Peter Pan by J. M. Barrie	Fantasy; Adventure; Family	

=== October – December ===
Opening		Title	Cast and crew	Details	Genre(s)	Ref.
O C T O B E R	1	Departure	Director: Andrew Steggall; Cast: Juliet Stevenson, Alex Lawther	Peccadillo Pictures	Romantic family drama	
O C T O B E R	10	Remainder	Director: Omer Fast; Cast: Tom Sturridge, Cush Jumbo, Ed Speleers	Soda Pictures; Based on Remainder by Tom McCarthy	Drama	
O C T O B E R	11	Room	Director: Lenny Abrahamson; Cast: Brie Larson, Jacob Tremblay, Joan Allen, William H. Macy, Sean Bridgers, Tom McCamus, Amanda Brugel, Joe Pingue, Cas Anvar	Universal Pictures	Drama	
O C T O B E R	15	Burn Burn Burn	Director: Chanya Button; Cast: Laura Carmichael, Chloe Pirrie, Jack Farthing, Joe Dempsie	Vendetta Films	Black comedy	
O C T O B E R	26	Howl	Director: Paul Hyett; Cast: Ed Speleers, Sean Pertwee, Holly Weston, Shauna Macdonald, Elliot Cowan, Rosie Day, Calvin Dean, Duncan Preston, Ross Mullan	Starchild Pictures	Horror	
O C T O B E R	26	Spectre	Director: Sam Mendes; Cast: Daniel Craig, Christoph Waltz, Léa Seydoux, Monica Bellucci, Ralph Fiennes	Metro-Goldwyn-Mayer Pictures; Part of the James Bond film series	Action	
N O V E M B E R	6	Kill Your Friends	Director: Owen Harris; Cast: Nicholas Hoult, Craig Roberts, Tom Riley, Georgia King	Based on Kill Your Friends by John Niven	Comedy; Crime; Thriller	
N O V E M B E R	13	Steve Jobs	Director: Danny Boyle; Cast: Michael Fassbender, Kate Winslet, Seth Rogen, Jeff Daniels	Cloud Eight Films, The Mark Gordon Company, Legendary Pictures	Drama	
N O V E M B E R	20	Carol	Director: Todd Haynes; Cast: Cate Blanchett, Rooney Mara, Sarah Paulson, Jake Lacy, Kyle Chandler, John Magaro, Cory Michael Smith, Carrie Brownstein, Kevin Crowley, Nik Pajic	Film4, Studiocanal, The Weinstein Company; Based on The Price of Salt by Patricia Highsmith	Romance; Drama	
D E C E M B E R	1					

== Other releases ==
- 51 Degrees North
- A Patch of Fog
- Aaaaaaaah!
- Aashiqui (with India)
- Afua's Diary
- Age of Kill
- Amar Akbar & Tony
- Angels vs Bullies
- Arthur and Merlin
- Black & Blue: The Paul Canoville Story
- Bone in the Throat (with the United States)
- Bone Tomahawk (with the United States)
- Born to Be Blue (with Canada and the United States)
- Brash Young Turks
- Cemetery of Splendour (with Thailand, Germany, France, Malaysia, South Korea, Mexico, the United States and Norway)
- Concussion (with Australia and the United States)
- Cream
- Creditors (with Spain)
- Curse of the Witching Tree
- Dark Summer (with the United States)
- Definition of Fear
- Demonic (with the United States)
- Youth (with Italy, France and Switzerland)

== Highest-grossing films ==
Listed here are the highest-grossing British films of 2015 so far, with their total earnings listed in British pound sterling. It includes films released in previous years that made money in 2015, particularly those that had minor releases in 2014 but their main releases in 2015.

Highest-grossing British films of 2015
Rank	Title	Studio	Worldwide gross
1	Fifty Shades of Grey	Universal Pictures	£370,030,000
2	Cinderella	Walt Disney Studios	£352,300,000
3	Kingsman: The Secret Service	20th Century Fox	£268,900,000
4	The Martian	20th Century Fox	£393,300,000
5	Paddington	StudioCanal	£168,550,000
6	Jupiter Ascending	Warner Bros. Pictures	£183,900,000
7	Everest	Universal Pictures	£113,020,000
8	Fantastic Four	20th Century Fox	£108,990,000
9	Seventh Son	Universal Pictures	£110,600,000
10	The Man From U.N.C.L.E.	Warner Bros. Pictures	£65,280,000

== British award winners ==
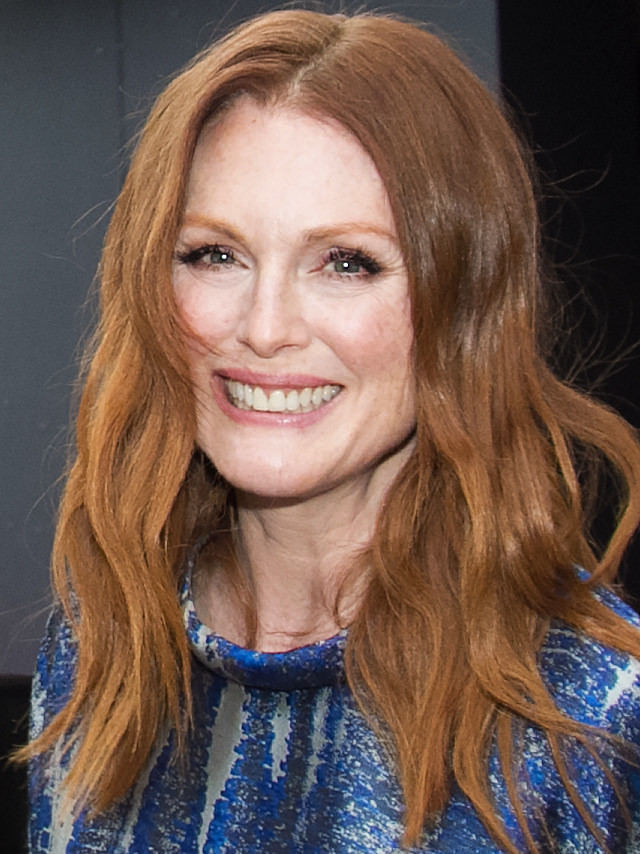
Julianne Moore received the best leading actress award at all five major awards ceremonies for her performance in Still Alice.

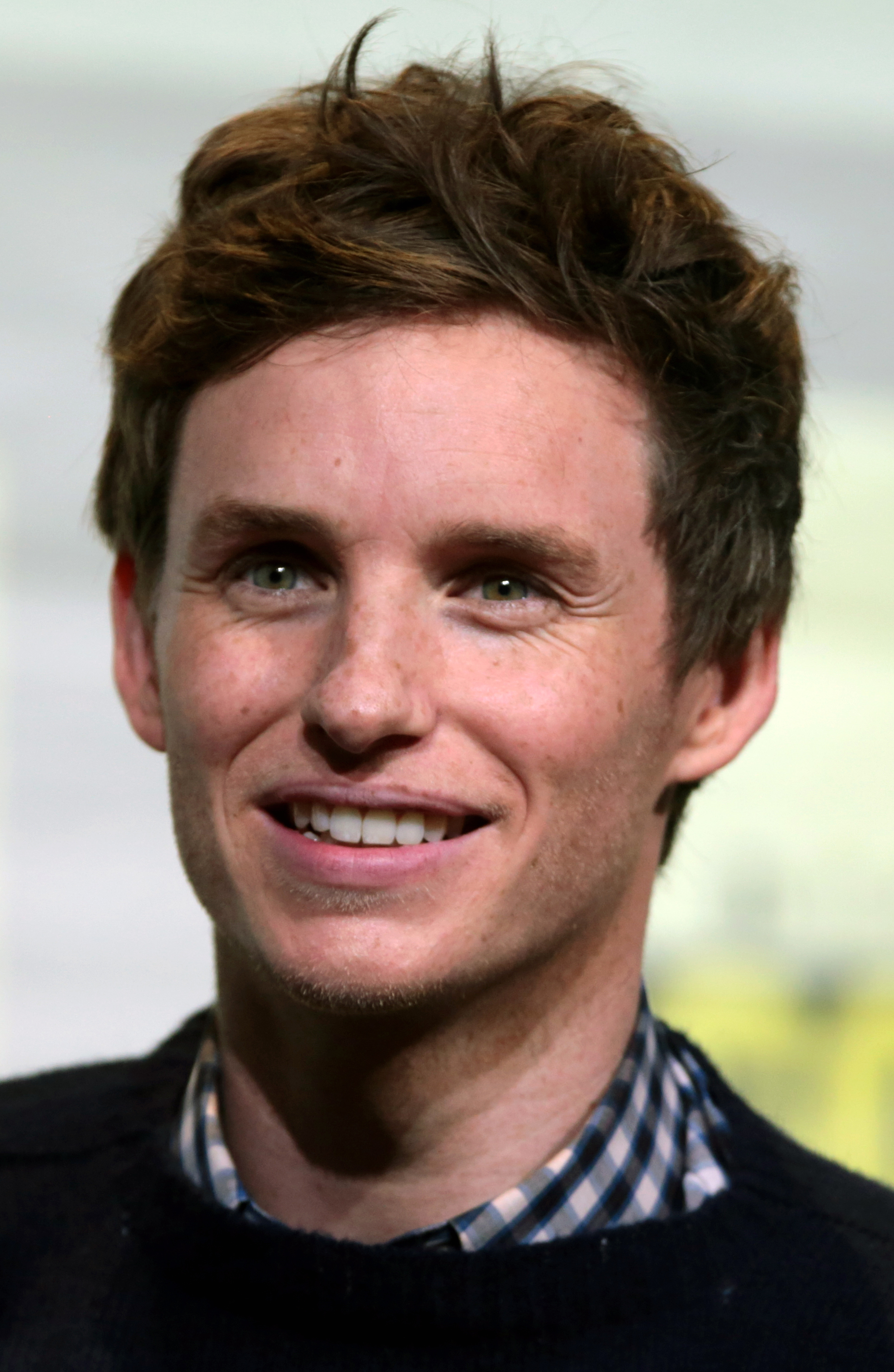
Eddie Redmayne won multiple awards for his portrayal of Stephen Hawking in The Theory of Everything.

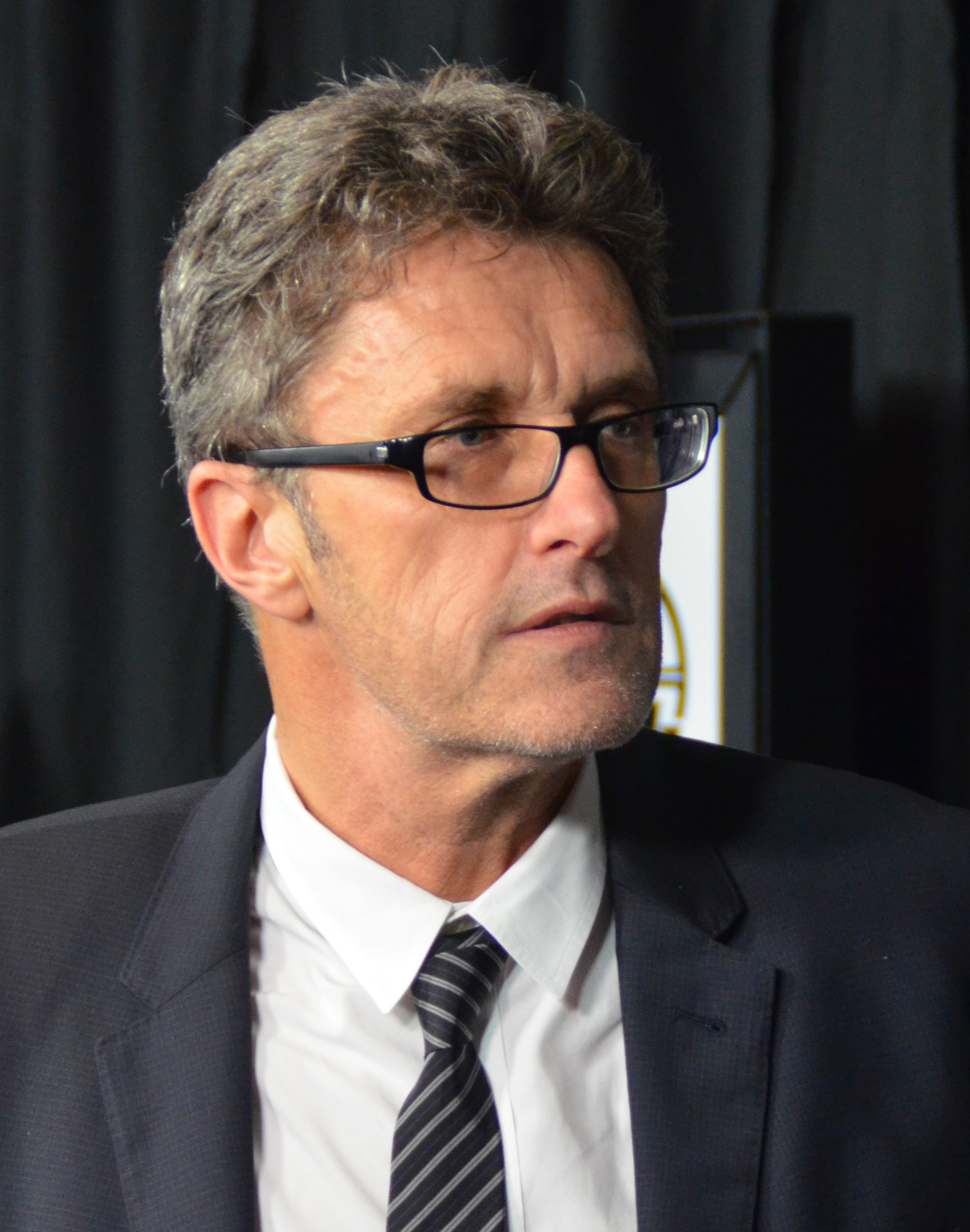
Paweł Pawlikowski, the multiple award-winning director of Ida

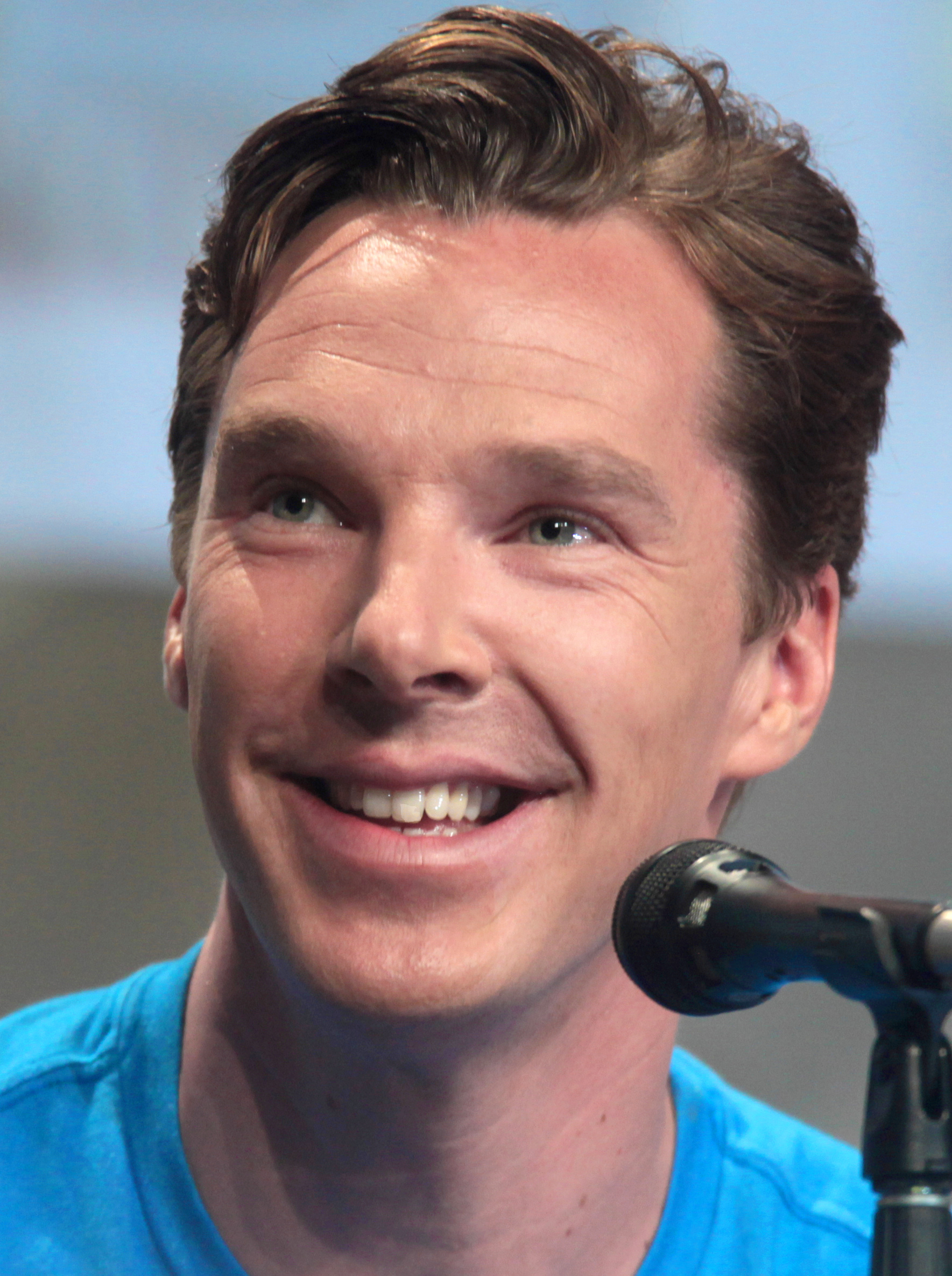
Benedict Cumberbatch received multiple awards nominations for his portrayal of Alan Turing in The Imitation Game.

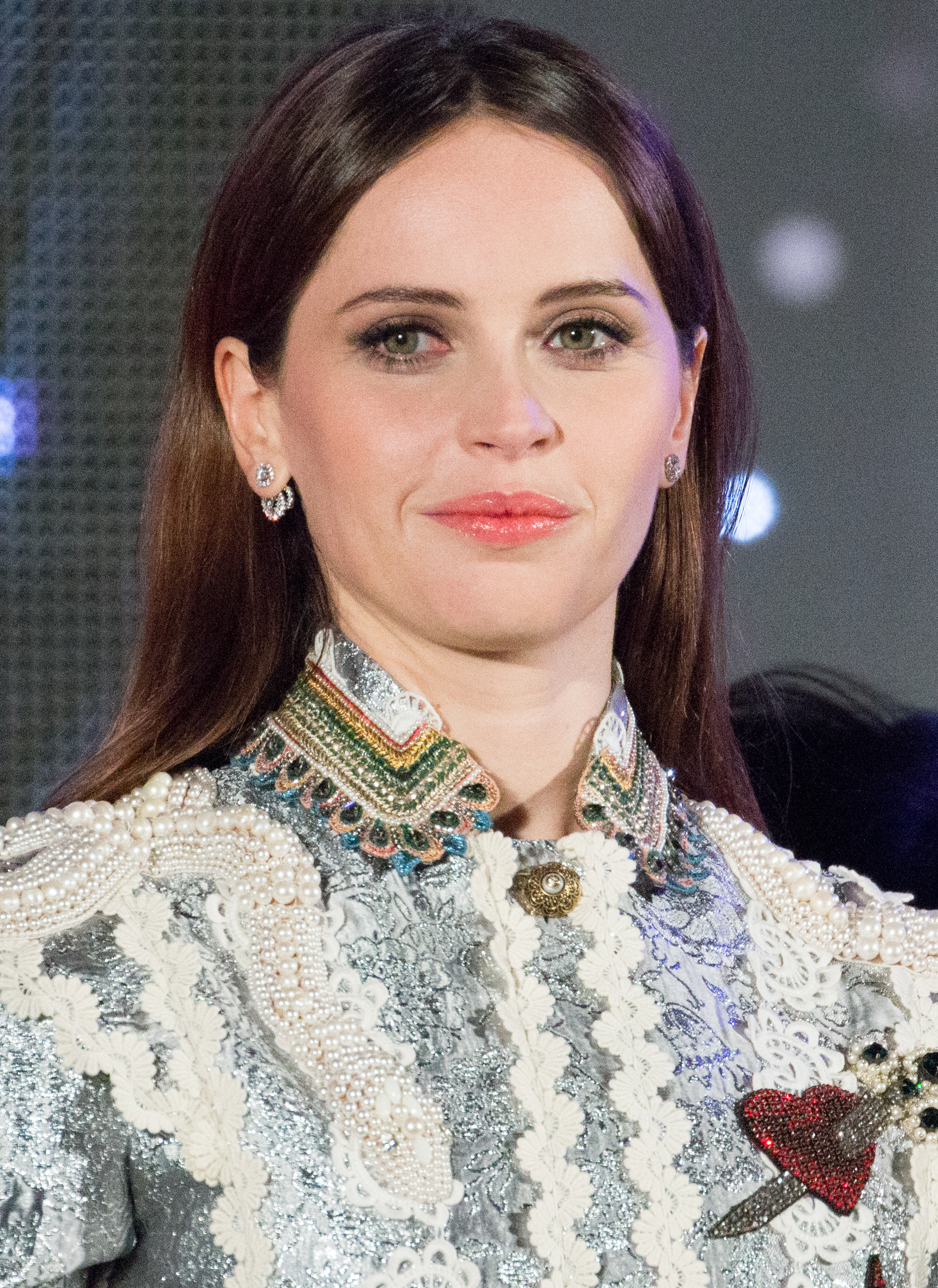
Felicity Jones received multiple awards nominations for her portrayal of Jane Wilde Hawking in The Theory of Everything.

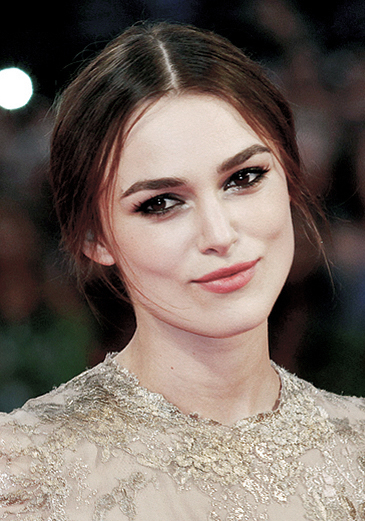
Keira Knightley received multiple awards nominations for her portrayal of Joan Clarke in The Imitation Game.

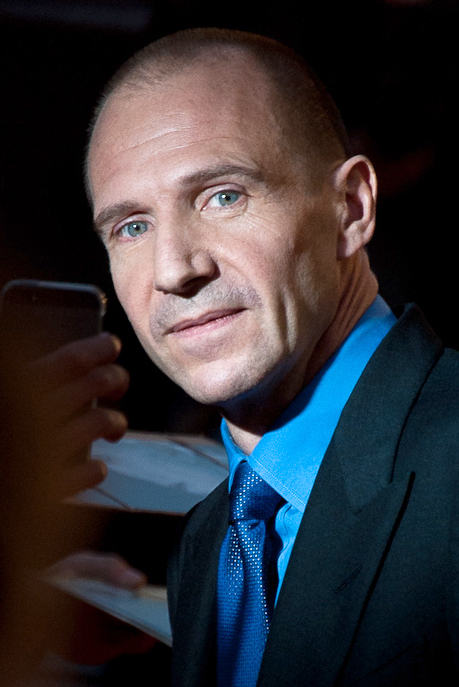
Ralph Fiennes received multiple awards nominations for his performance in The Grand Budapest Hotel.

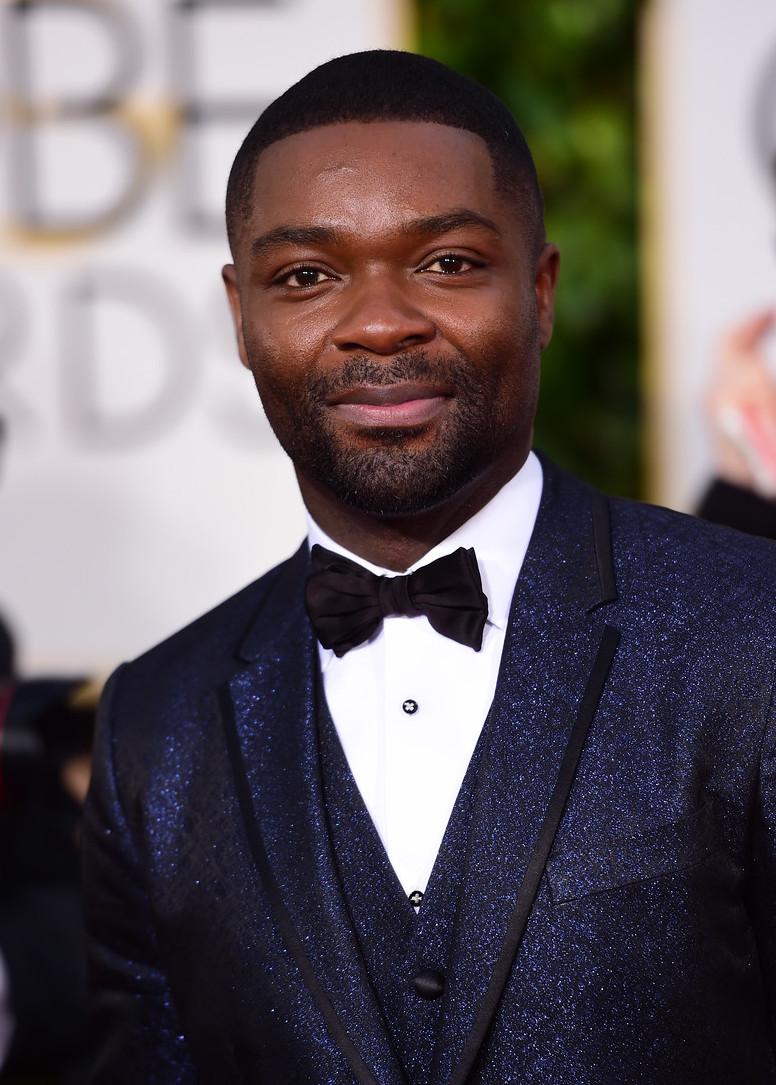
David Oyelowo received multiple awards nominations for his portrayal of Martin Luther King Jr. in Selma.

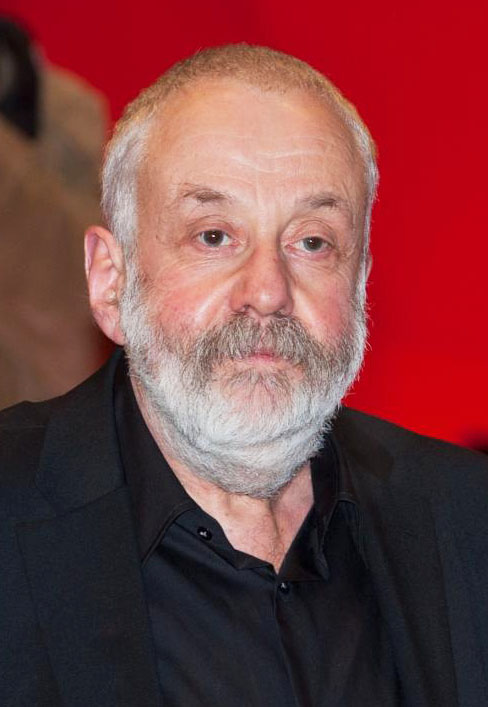
Mike Leigh won the British Academy Fellowship Award.

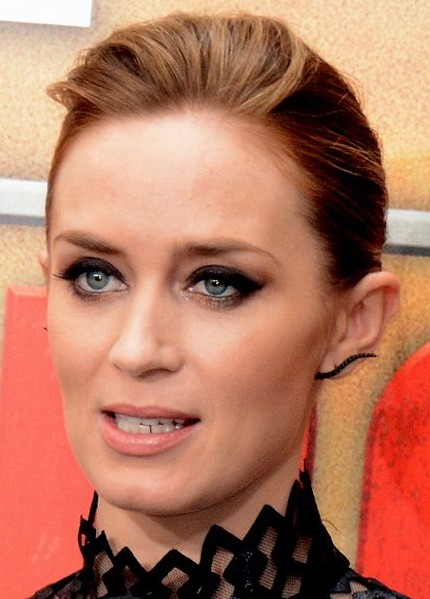
Emily Blunt won the Critics' Choice Award for Best Actress in an Action Movie.

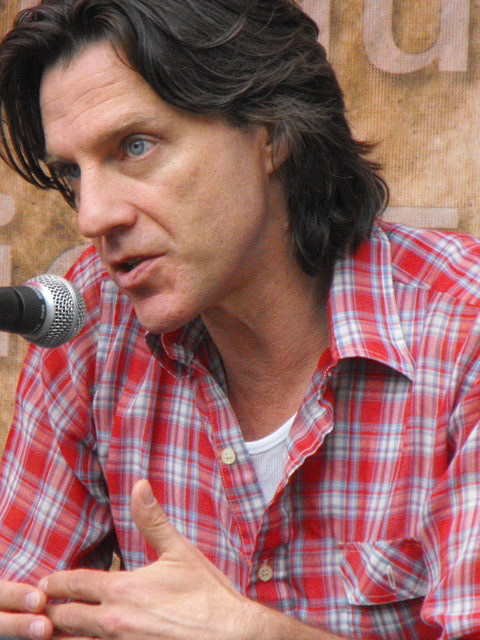
James Marsh, the multiple award-winning director of The Theory of Everything

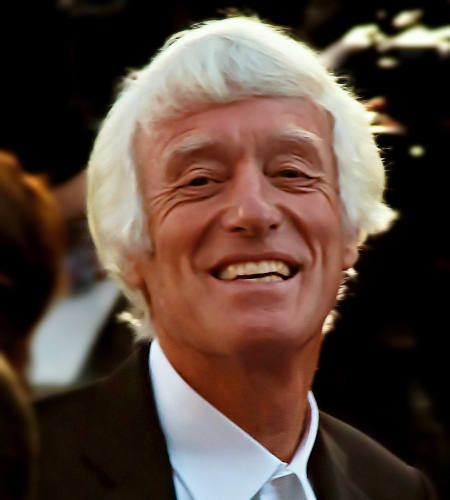
Roger Deakins received multiple awards nominations for his cinematography in Unbroken.

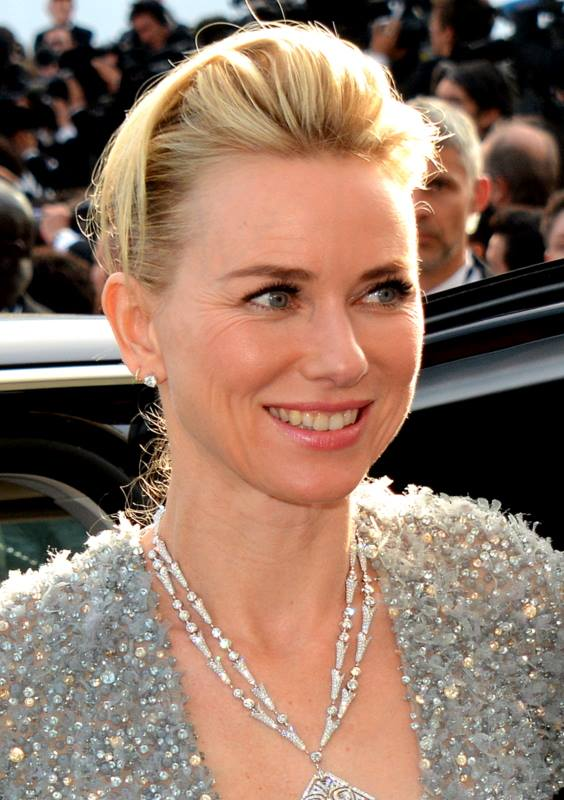
Naomi Watts won a Screen Actors Guild Award for Birdman and was nominated for St. Vincent.

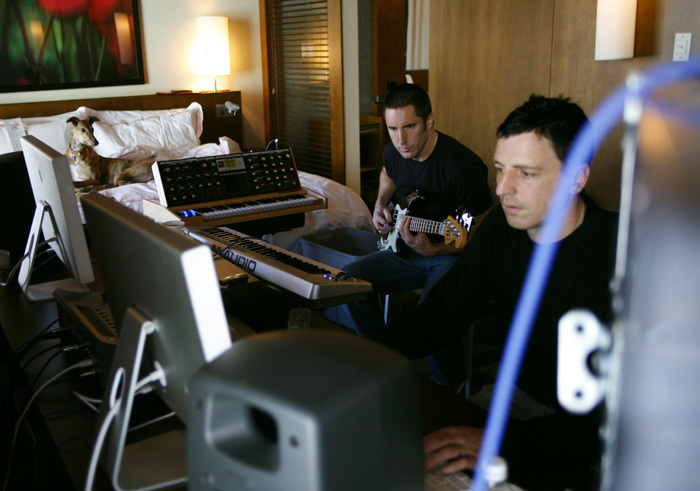
Atticus Ross (right) received multiple awards nominations for his soundtrack to Gone Girl.

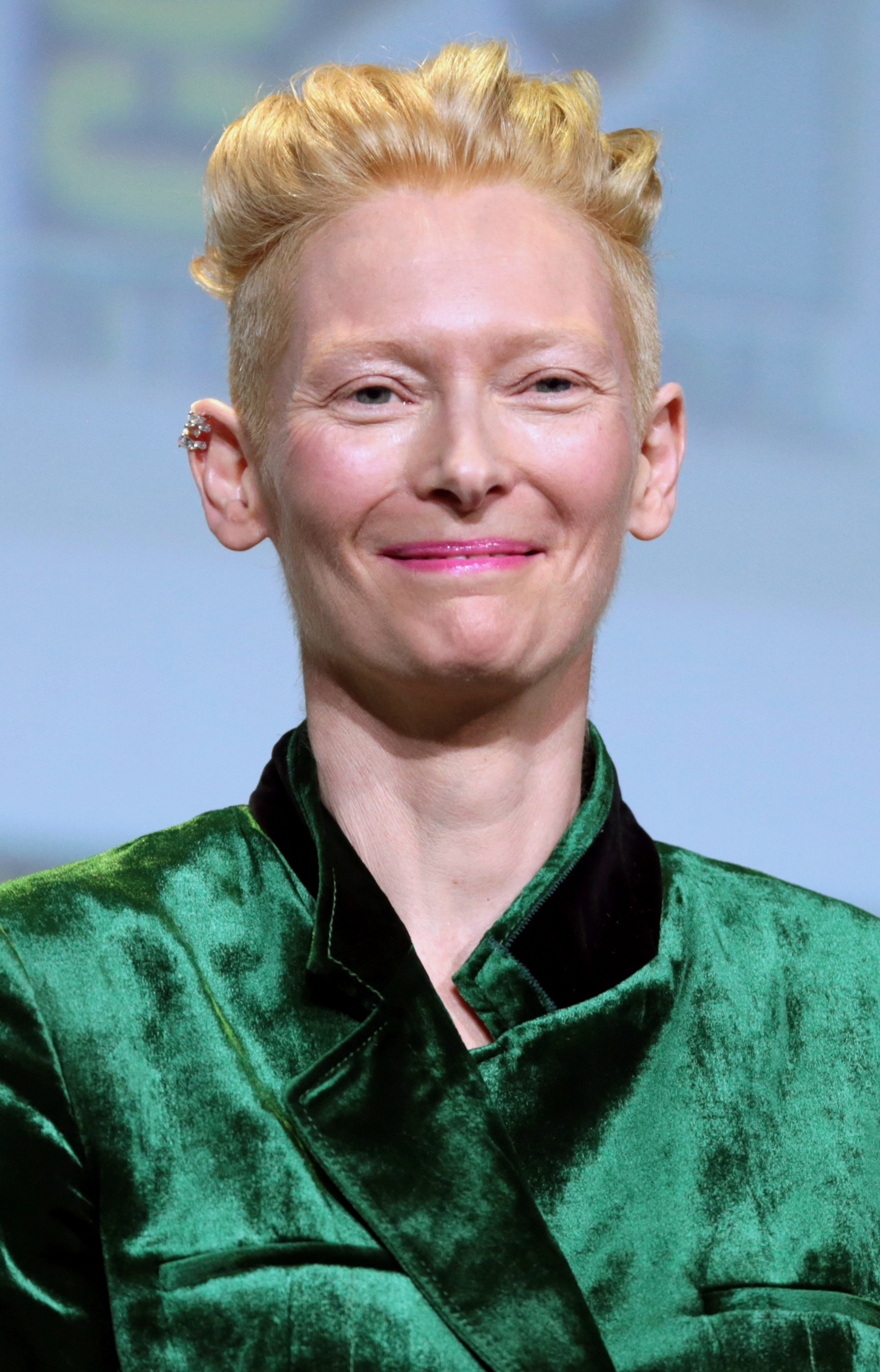
Tilda Swinton received major awards nominations for two films: The Grand Budapest Hotel and Snowpiercer.

Micachu, the BAFTA-nominated composer of Under the Skin

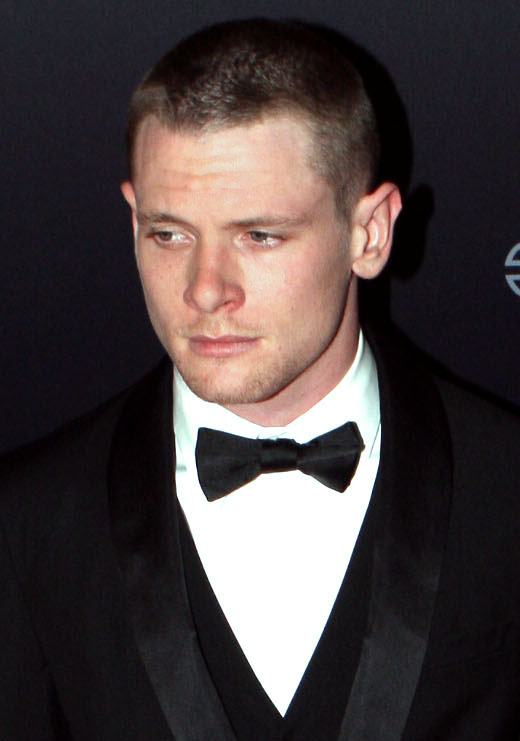
Jack O'Connell won the EE Rising Star Award.

Listed here are the British winners and nominees at the five most prestigious film award ceremonies in the English-speaking world: the Academy Awards, British Academy Film Awards, Critics' Choice Awards, Golden Globe Awards and Screen Actors Guild Awards, that were held during 2015, celebrating the best films of 2014. The British nominations were led by The Theory of Everything, The Grand Budapest Hotel, The Imitation Game and Selma, with The Grand Budapest Hotel going on to win large numbers of technical awards, whilst Eddie Redmayne and Julianne Moore won multiple best leading actor and leading actress awards for The Theory of Everything and Still Alice respectively. British films did, however, notably lose out to Boyhood and Birdman (both from the United States).

=== Academy Awards ===
The 87th Academy Awards honoring the best films of 2014 were held on 22 February 2015.

British winners:

- Ida (Best Foreign Language Film)
- Interstellar (Best Visual Effects)
- Room (Best Actress)
- The Grand Budapest Hotel (Best Original Score, Best Production Design, Best Makeup and Hairstyling, Best Costume Design)
- The Imitation Game (Best Adapted Screenplay)
- The Phone Call (Best Live Action Short Film)
- The Theory of Everything (Best Actor)
- Andrew Lockley (Best Visual Effects) - Interstellar
- Ben Wilkins (Best Sound Mixing) - Whiplash
- Eddie Redmayne (Best Actor) - The Theory of Everything
- Julianne Moore (Best Actress) - Still Alice
- Mark Coulier (Best Makeup and Hairstyling) - The Grand Budapest Hotel
- Mat Kirkby (Best Live Action Short Film) - The Phone Call
- Paul Franklin (Best Visual Effects) - Interstellar
- Paweł Pawlikowski (Best Foreign Language Film) - Ida

British nominations:

- Boogaloo and Graham (Best Live Action Short Film)
- Guardians of the Galaxy (Best Makeup and Hairstyling, Best Visual Effects)
- Ida (Best Cinematography)
- Interstellar (Best Original Score, Best Sound Editing, Best Sound Mixing, Best Production Design)
- Into the Woods (Best Actress, Best Production Design, Best Costume Design)
- Maleficent (Best Costume Design)
- Mr. Turner (Best Original Score, Best Production Design, Best Cinematography, Best Costume Design)
- Room (Best Adapted Screenplay, Best Director, Best Picture)
- Selma (Best Picture)
- The Bigger Picture (Best Animated Short Film)
- The Grand Budapest Hotel (Best Picture, Best Directing, Best Original Screenplay, Best Cinematography, Best Film Editing)
- The Imitation Game (Best Picture, Best Directing, Best Actor, Best Supporting Actress, Best Original Score, Best Production Design, Best Film Editing)
- The Theory of Everything (Best Picture, Best Actress, Best Adapted Screenplay, Best Original Score)
- Virunga (Best Documentary – Feature)
- X-Men: Days of Future Past (Best Visual Effects)
- Barney Pilling (Best Film Editing) - The Grand Budapest Hotel
- Benedict Cumberbatch (Best Actor) - The Imitation Game
- Christian Colson (Best Picture) - Selma
- David White (Best Makeup and Hairstyling) - Guardians of the Galaxy
- Dick Pope (Best Cinematography) - Mr. Turner
- Eric Fellner (Best Picture) - The Theory of Everything
- Felicity Jones (Best Actress) - The Theory of Everything
- Gary Yershon (Best Original Score) - Mr. Turner
- Jacqueline Durran (Best Costume Design) - Mr. Turner
- Keira Knightley (Best Supporting Actress) - The Imitation Game
- Michael Lennox (Best Live Action Short Film) - Boogaloo and Graham
- Nathan Crowley (Best Production Design) - Interstellar
- Paul Corbould (Best Visual Effects) - Guardians of the Galaxy
- Roger Deakins (Best Cinematography) - Unbroken
- Rosamund Pike (Best Actress) - Gone Girl
- Tim Bevan (Best Picture) - The Theory of Everything
- Tomm Moore (Best Animated Feature Film) - Song of the Sea

=== British Academy Film Awards ===
The 68th British Academy Film Awards were held on 8 February 2015.

British winners:

- Boogaloo and Graham (Best Short Film)
- Citizenfour (Best Documentary)
- Ida (Best Film Not in the English Language)
- Interstellar (Best Special Visual Effects)
- Pride (Outstanding Debut by a British Writer, Director or Producer)
- Room (Best Actress)
- The Bigger Picture (Best Short Animation)
- The Grand Budapest Hotel (Best Original Screenplay, Best Original Music, Best Production Design, Best Costume Design, Best Makeup and Hair)
- The Theory of Everything (Best Actor in a Leading Role, Best Adapted Screenplay, Outstanding British Film)
- Andrew Lockley (Best Special Visual Effects) - Interstellar
- Ben Wilkins (Best Sound) - Whiplash
- David Livingstone (Outstanding Debut by a British Writer, Director or Producer) - Pride
- Eddie Redmayne (Best Actor in a Leading Role) - The Theory of Everything
- Eric Fellner (Outstanding British Film) - The Theory of Everything
- Jack O'Connell (EE Rising Star Award)
- James Marsh (Outstanding British Film) - The Theory of Everything
- Julianne Moore (Best Actress in a Leading Role) - Still Alice
- Mark Coulier (Best Makeup and Hair) - The Grand Budapest Hotel
- Michael Lennox (Best Short Film) - Boogaloo and Graham
- Mike Leigh (Academy Fellowship)
- Paul Franklin (Best Special Visual Effects) - Interstellar
- Paweł Pawlikowski (Best Film Not in the English Language) - Ida
- Stephen Beresford (Outstanding Debut by a British Writer, Director or Producer) - Pride
- Tim Bevan (Outstanding British Film) - The Theory of Everything
- BBC Films (Outstanding British Contribution to Cinema)

British nominations:

- 20,000 Days on Earth (Best Documentary)
- '71 (Outstanding Debut by a British Writer, Director or Producer, Outstanding British Film)
- Guardians of the Galaxy (Best Special Visual Effects, Best Makeup and Hair)
- Ida (Best Cinematography)
- Interstellar (Best Cinematography, Best Original Music, Best Production Design)
- Into the Woods (Best Costume Design, Best Makeup and Hair)
- Kajaki (Outstanding Debut by a British Writer, Director or Producer)
- Lilting (Outstanding Debut by a British Writer, Director or Producer)
- Mr. Turner (Best Cinematography, Best Production Design, Best Costume Design, Best Makeup and Hair)
- Northern Soul (Outstanding Debut by a British Writer, Director or Producer)
- Paddington (Best Adapted Screenplay, Outstanding British Film)
- Pride (Best Actress in a Supporting Role, Outstanding British Film)
- Room (Best Adapted Screenplay)
- The Grand Budapest Hotel (Best Film, Best Director, Best Actor in a Leading Role, Best Cinematography, Best Sound, Best Editing)
- The Imitation Game (Best Film, Best Actor in a Leading Role, Best Actress in a Supporting Role, Best Adapted Screenplay, Outstanding British Film, Best Sound, Best Production Design, Best Costume Design, Best Editing)
- The Theory of Everything (Best Film, Best Director, Best Actress in a Leading Role, Best Original Music, Best Costume Design, Best Makeup and Hair, Best Editing)
- Trash (Best Film Not in the English Language)
- Under the Skin (Outstanding British Film, Best Original Music)
- Virunga (Best Documentary)
- X-Men: Days of Future Past (Best Special Visual Effects)
- Ainslie Henderson (Best Short Animation) - Monkey Love Experiments
- Andrew de Lotbiniere (Outstanding Debut by a British Writer, Director or Producer) - Kajaki
- Barney Pilling (Best Editing) - The Grand Budapest Hotel
- Benedict Cumberbatch (Best Actor in a Leading Role) - The Imitation Game
- David Heyman (Outstanding British Film) - Paddington
- David White (Best Makeup and Hair) - Guardians of the Galaxy
- Dick Pope (Best Cinematography) - Mr. Turner
- Elaine Constantine (Outstanding Debut by a British Writer, Director or Producer) - Northern Soul
- Eric Fellner (Best Film) - The Theory of Everything / (Best Film Not in the English Language) - Trash
- Felicity Jones (Best Actress in a Leading Role) - The Theory of Everything
- Gregory Burke (Outstanding Debut by a British Writer, Director or Producer, Outstanding British Film) - '71
- Gugu Mbatha-Raw (EE Rising Star Award)
- Hong Khaou (Outstanding Debut by a British Writer, Director or Producer) - Lilting
- Iain Forsyth (Best Documentary) - 20,000 Days on Earth
- Imelda Staunton (Best Actress in a Supporting Role) - Pride
- James Marsh (Best Director) - The Theory of Everything
- John Midgley (Best Sound) - The Imitation Game
- Jane Pollard (Best Documentary) - 20,000 Days on Earth
- Jacqueline Durran (Best Costume Design) - Mr. Turner
- Jonathan Glazer (Outstanding British Film) - Under the Skin
- Keira Knightley (Best Actress in a Supporting Role) - The Imitation Game
- Matthew Warchus (Outstanding British Film) - Pride
- Mica Levi (Best Original Music) - Under the Skin
- Nathan Crowley (Best Production Design) - Interstellar
- Paul Katis (Outstanding Debut by a British Writer, Director or Producer) - Kajaki
- Paul King (Best Adapted Screenplay, Outstanding British Film) - Paddington
- Peter King (Best Makeup and Hair) - Into the Woods
- Ralph Fiennes (Best Actor in a Leading Role) - The Grand Budapest Hotel
- Rosamund Pike (Best Actress in a Leading Role) - Gone Girl
- Stephen Beresford (Outstanding British Film) - Pride
- Stephen Daldry (Best Film Not in the English Language) - Trash
- Tim Bevan (Best Film) - The Theory of Everything / (Best Film Not in the English Language) - Trash

=== Critics' Choice Awards ===
The 20th Critics' Choice Awards were held on 15 January 2015.

British winners:

- Guardians of the Galaxy (Best Action Movie, Best Hair & Makeup)
- Interstellar (Best Sci-Fi/Horror Movie)
- Room (Best Actress, Best Young Performer)
- Selma (Best Song)
- The Grand Budapest Hotel (Best Comedy, Best Art Direction, Best Costume Design)
- Emily Blunt (Best Actress in an Action Movie) - Edge of Tomorrow
- Julianne Moore (Best Actress) - Still Alice

British nominations:

- Citizenfour (Best Documentary Feature)
- Fury (Best Action Movie, Best Actor in an Action Movie)
- Guardians of the Galaxy (Best Actor in an Action Movie, Best Actress in an Action Movie, Best Visual Effects)
- Ida (Best Foreign Language Film)
- Interstellar (Best Young Actor/Actress, Best Art Direction, Best Cinematography, Best Editing, Best Visual Effects, Best Score)
- Into the Woods (Best Supporting Actress, Best Acting Ensemble, Best Art Direction, Best Costume Design, Best Hair & Makeup)
- Maleficent (Best Costume Design, Best Hair & Makeup)
- Mr. Turner (Best Cinematography, Best Costume Design)
- Room (Best Picture, Best Adapted Screenplay)
- Selma (Best Picture, Best Director, Best Actor, Best Acting Ensemble)
- The Grand Budapest Hotel (Best Picture, Best Director, Best Actor, Best Young Actor/Actress, Best Acting Ensemble, Best Original Screenplay, Best Actor in a Comedy, Best Cinematography)
- The Imitation Game (Best Picture, Best Actor, Best Supporting Actress, Best Acting Ensemble, Best Adapted Screenplay, Best Score)
- The Theory of Everything (Best Picture, Best Actor, Best Actress, Best Adapted Screenplay, Best Score)
- Under the Skin (Best Sci-Fi/Horror Movie)
- Atticus Ross (Best Score) - Gone Girl
- Benedict Cumberbatch (Best Actor) - The Imitation Game
- David Oyelowo (Best Actor) - Selma
- Dick Pope (Best Cinematography) - Mr. Turner
- Eddie Redmayne (Best Actor) - The Theory of Everything
- Felicity Jones (Best Actress) - The Theory of Everything
- Jacqueline Durran (Best Costume Design) - Mr. Turner
- Keira Knightley (Best Supporting Actress) - The Imitation Game / (Best Song) - Begin Again
- Nick Hornby (Best Adapted Screenplay) - Wild
- Ralph Fiennes (Best Actor, Best Actor in a Comedy) - The Grand Budapest Hotel
- Roger Deakins (Best Cinematography) - Unbroken
- Rosamund Pike (Best Actress) - Gone Girl
- Tilda Swinton (Best Supporting Actress) - Snowpiercer
- William Nicholson (Best Adapted Screenplay) - Unbroken

=== Golden Globe Awards ===
The 72nd Golden Globe Awards were held on 11 January 2015.

British winners:

- Room (Best Actress in a Motion Picture – Drama)
- Selma (Best Original Song)
- The Grand Budapest Hotel (Best Motion Picture - Musical or Comedy)
- The Theory of Everything (Best Actor - Motion Picture Drama, Best Original Score)
- Eddie Redmayne (Best Actor - Motion Picture Drama) - The Theory of Everything
- Julianne Moore (Best Actress - Motion Picture Drama) - Still Alice

British nominations:

- Ida (Best Foreign Language Film)
- Interstellar (Best Original Score)
- Into the Woods (Best Motion Picture - Musical or Comedy, Best Actress - Motion Picture Musical or Comedy, Best Supporting Actress)
- Pride (Best Motion Picture - Musical or Comedy)
- Room (Best Screenplay, Best Motion Picture – Drama)
- Selma (Best Motion Picture - Drama, Best Actor - Motion Picture Drama)
- The Grand Budapest Hotel (Best Actor - Motion Picture Musical or Comedy, Best Director, Best Screenplay)
- The Imitation Game (Best Motion Picture - Drama, Best Actor - Motion Picture Drama, Best Supporting Actress, Best Screenplay, Best Original Score)
- The Theory of Everything (Best Motion Picture - Drama, Best Actress - Motion Picture Drama)
- Atticus Ross (Best Original Score) - Gone Girl
- Benedict Cumberbatch (Best Actor - Motion Picture Drama) - The Imitation Game
- David Oyelowo (Best Actor - Motion Picture Drama) - Selma
- Emily Blunt (Best Actress - Motion Picture Musical or Comedy) - Into the Woods
- Felicity Jones (Best Actress - Motion Picture Drama) - The Theory of Everything
- Helen Mirren (Best Actress - Motion Picture Musical or Comedy) - The Hundred-Foot Journey
- Julianne Moore (Best Actress - Motion Picture Musical or Comedy) - Maps to the Stars
- Keira Knightley (Best Supporting Actress) - The Imitation Game
- Ralph Fiennes (Best Actor - Motion Picture Musical or Comedy) - The Grand Budapest Hotel
- Rosamund Pike (Best Actress - Motion Picture Drama) - Gone Girl

=== Screen Actors Guild Awards ===
The 21st Screen Actors Guild Awards were held on 25 January 2015.

British winners:

- Room (Outstanding Performance by a Female Role in a Leading Role)
- The Theory of Everything (Outstanding Performance by a Male Actor in a Leading Role)
- Andrea Riseborough (Outstanding Performance by a Cast in a Motion Picture) - Birdman
- Eddie Redmayne (Outstanding Performance by a Male Actor in a Leading Role) - The Theory of Everything
- Julianne Moore (Outstanding Performance by a Female Actor in a Leading Role) - Still Alice
- Naomi Watts (Outstanding Performance by a Cast in a Motion Picture) - Birdman

British nominations:

- Fury (Outstanding Performance by a Stunt Ensemble in a Motion Picture)
- Get on Up (Outstanding Performance by a Stunt Ensemble in a Motion Picture)
- Into the Woods (Outstanding Performance by a Female Actor in a Supporting Role)
- Room (Outstanding Performance by a Male Actor in a Supporting Role)
- The Grand Budapest Hotel (Outstanding Performance by a Cast in a Motion Picture)
- The Imitation Game (Outstanding Performance by a Male Actor in a Leading Role, Outstanding Performance by a Female Actor in a Supporting Role, Outstanding Performance by a Cast in a Motion Picture)
- The Theory of Everything (Outstanding Performance by a Female Actor in a Leading Role, Outstanding Performance by a Cast in a Motion Picture)
- X-Men: Days of Future Past (Outstanding Performance by a Stunt Ensemble in a Motion Picture)
- Benedict Cumberbatch (Outstanding Performance by a Male Actor in a Leading Role, Outstanding Performance by a Cast in a Motion Picture) - The Imitation Game
- Charles Dance (Outstanding Performance by a Cast in a Motion Picture) - The Imitation Game
- Charlie Cox (Outstanding Performance by a Cast in a Motion Picture) - The Theory of Everything
- David Thewlis (Outstanding Performance by a Cast in a Motion Picture) - The Theory of Everything
- Eddie Redmayne (Outstanding Performance by a Cast in a Motion Picture) - The Theory of Everything
- Emily Watson (Outstanding Performance by a Cast in a Motion Picture) - The Theory of Everything
- Felicity Jones (Outstanding Performance by a Female Actor in a Leading Role, Outstanding Performance by a Cast in a Motion Picture) - The Theory of Everything
- Jude Law (Outstanding Performance by a Cast in a Motion Picture) - The Grand Budapest Hotel
- Keira Knightley (Outstanding Performance by a Female Actor in a Supporting Role, Outstanding Performance by a Cast in a Motion Picture) - The Imitation Game
- Mark Strong (Outstanding Performance by a Cast in a Motion Picture) - The Imitation Game
- Matthew Beard (Outstanding Performance by a Cast in a Motion Picture) - The Imitation Game
- Matthew Goode (Outstanding Performance by a Cast in a Motion Picture) - The Imitation Game
- Naomi Watts (Outstanding Performance by a Female Actor in a Supporting Role) - St. Vincent
- Ralph Fiennes (Outstanding Performance by a Cast in a Motion Picture) - The Grand Budapest Hotel
- Rosamund Pike (Outstanding Performance by a Female Actor in a Leading Role) - Gone Girl
- Rory Kinnear (Outstanding Performance by a Cast in a Motion Picture) - The Imitation Game
- Simon McBurney (Outstanding Performance by a Cast in a Motion Picture) - The Theory of Everything
- Tilda Swinton (Outstanding Performance by a Cast in a Motion Picture) - The Grand Budapest Hotel
- Tom Wilkinson (Outstanding Performance by a Cast in a Motion Picture) - The Grand Budapest Hotel

== Notable deaths ==
Month	Date	Name	Age	Nationality	Profession	Notable films
January	4	Bernard Williams	72	English	Producer, production manager	Daredevil; Star Trek Generations; What About Bob?; The Bounty
January	5	Khan Bonfils	42	English	Actor	Star Wars: Episode I – The Phantom Menace; Batman Begins; Skyfall; Lara Croft Tomb Raider: The Cradle of Life
January	6	Lance Percival	81	English	Actor, singer	Yellow Submarine; Carry On Cruising; The Yellow Rolls-Royce; Darling Lili
January	10	Brian Clemens	83	English	Screenwriter, producer	Highlander II: The Quickening; Dr. Jekyll and Sister Hyde; The Tell-Tale Heart; The Golden Voyage of Sinbad
January	11	Chic Littlewood	84	English-New Zealand	Actor	King Kong; 30 Days of Night
January	14	Darren Shahlavi	42	English	Actor, stuntman, choreographer	300; Night at the Museum; Watchmen; Tomorrowland
January	21	Pauline Yates	85	English	Actress	Darling; Identity Unknown; She'll Be Wearing Pink Pyjamas
January	23	Barrie Ingham	82	English-American	Actor	The Great Mouse Detective; Dr. Who and the Daleks; A Challenge for Robin Hood; The Day of the Jackal
January	24	Lisa Daniely	84	English	Actress	Tiger by the Tail; Hindle Wakes; The Vicious Circle; Curse of Simba
January	30	Geraldine McEwan	82	English	Actress, singer	Robin Hood: Prince of Thieves; Vanity Fair; Henry V; Wallace & Gromit: The Curse of the Were-Rabbit
February	4	Richard Bonehill	67	English	Actor, stuntman	Star Wars; Flash Gordon; Highlander; Rob Roy
February	13	Hugh Walters	75	English	Actor	Jules Verne's Rocket to the Moon; George and Mildred
February	14	Pamela Cundell	95	English	Actress	Half a Sixpence; Love Thy Neighbour; The Wicked Lady; A Fantastic Fear of Everything
February	14	Alan Howard	77	English	Actor	The Lord of the Rings; The V.I.P.s; Victim; The Cook, the Thief, His Wife & Her Lover
February	15	Eileen Essell	92	English	Actress	Finding Neverland; The Producers; Charlie and the Chocolate Factory; Ali G Indahouse
February	25	Terry Gill	75	English-Australian	Actor	"Crocodile" Dundee; High Rolling; Phar Lap; The Wannabes
March	10	Stuart Wagstaff	90	English-Australian	Actor	A Night to Remember; For Pete's Sake; Sunstruck
March	13	Vincent Wong	87	British	Actor	Little Shop of Horrors; Batman; Die Another Day; Batman Begins
	17	Shaw Taylor	90	English	Actor	The Medusa Touch; X the Unknown
April	3	Robert Rietti	91	English	Actor	James Bond; The Omen; The Italian Job; Hannibal
April	7	Dickie Owen	88	English	Actor	Chitty Chitty Bang Bang; The Curse of the Mummy's Tomb; Zulu; The Mummy's Shroud
April	13	Claire Gordon	74	English	Actress	Konga; Beat Girl; Great Catherine; Cool It Carol!
April	13	Rex Robinson	89	English	Actor	Superman IV: The Quest for Peace; A Nightingale Sang in Berkeley Square
April	20	Peter Howell	95	English	Actor	Tarzan the Magnificent; Shadowlands; The Libertine; The Devil-Ship Pirates
April	25	Don Mankiewicz	93	German-English	Screenwriter	House of Numbers; The Chapman Report; The Black Bird
April	30	Nigel Terry	69	English	Actor	The Lion in Winter; Troy; Excalibur; Edward II
May	9	Christopher Wood	79	English	Screenwriter	James Bond; Remo Williams: The Adventure Begins; Confessions of a Window Cleaner; Rosie Dixon – Night Nurse
May	28	Johnny Keating	87	Scottish	Composer	Innocent Bystanders; Robbery; Hotel
May	30	Jake D'Arcy	69	Scottish	Actor	Gregory's Girl; The Little Vampire; Death Watch; Gospel According to Vic
May	30	Julie Harris	94	English	Costume designer	Live and Let Die; A Hard Day's Night; Carry On Cleo; The Great Muppet Caper; Darling
June	5	Richard Johnson	87	English	Actor	The Amorous Adventures of Moll Flanders; Lara Croft: Tomb Raider; The Boy in the Striped Pyjamas; Julius Caesar; The Haunting
June	7	Christopher Lee	93	English	Actor, singer	The Lord of the Rings; Star Wars; Dracula; Charlie and the Chocolate Factory; The Man with the Golden Gun
June	11	Ron Moody	91	English	Actor	Oliver!; A Kid in King Arthur's Court; The Twelve Chairs; The Mouse on the Moon
June	13	Junix Inocian	64	Filipino-English	Actor	Mortdecai; The 51st State; The Lady; Maybe Baby
June	23	Elizabeth MacLennan	77	Scottish-English	Actress	The House in Nightmare Park; Hands of the Ripper; Joanna
June	25	Patrick Macnee	93	English-American	Actor	The Avengers; A View to a Kill; This Is Spinal Tap; Scrooge; The Sea Wolves
June	30	Edward Burnham	98	English	Actor	The Abominable Dr. Phibes; To Sir, with Love; 10 Rillington Place; Little Dorrit
July	10	Roger Rees	71	Welsh-American	Actor	Robin Hood: Men in Tights; Frida; Garfield: A Tail of Two Kitties; The Pink Panther
July	14	Olaf Pooley	101	English	Actor	The Assassination Bureau; The Lost People; Windom's Way
July	15	Aubrey Morris	89	English	Actor	A Clockwork Orange; The Wicker Man; Love and Death; Blood from the Mummy's Tomb; My Girl 2
July	17	Nova Pilbeam	95	English	Actress	The Man Who Knew Too Much; Young and Innocent; The Next of Kin Tudor Rose
July	22	Natasha Parry	84	English	Actress	Romeo and Juliet; Oh! What a Lovely War; Midnight Lace; Girl in the Headlines
July	25	Robin Phillips	75	English-Canadian	Actor	Tales from the Crypt; Decline and Fall... of a Birdwatcher; Two Gentlemen Sharing
July	29	Antony Holland	95	English-Canadian	Actor	McCabe & Mrs. Miller; The Accused; Cousins; Narrow Margin
July	30	Clifford Earl	81	English	Actor	Tales from the Crypt; The Sea Wolves; The Haunted House of Horror; The Body Stealers
August	1	Cilla Black	72	English	Actress, singer	Work Is a Four-Letter Word; Ferry Cross the Mersey
August	5	George Cole	90	English	Actor	Cleopatra; Henry V; Scrooge; The Belles of St Trinian's
August	8	Susan Sheridan	68	English	Actress	The Black Cauldron; Eisenstein
August	9	Jack Gold	85	English	Actor	Aces High; Man Friday; The National Health
August	12	Stephen Lewis	88	English	Actor, screenwriter	On the Buses; Staircase; Sparrows Can't Sing; The Krays
September	3	Judy Carne	76	English	Actress	A Pair of Briefs; The Americanization of Emily; All the Right Noises
September	19	Jackie Collins	77	English-American	Actress, screenwriter	Barnacle Bill; Intent to Kill; The Safecracker; Yesterday's Hero
September	22	Derek Ware	77	English	Actor, stuntman	The Italian Job; Robin Hood: Prince of Thieves; Willow; Witchfinder General
September	27	John Guillermin	89	English-American	Director, producer	King Kong; Shaft in Africa; The Towering Inferno; Tarzan's Greatest Adventure; The Bridge at Remagen
October	8	Richard Davies	89	Welsh	Actor	Please Sir!; Zulu; The Lavender Hill Mob; The Mutations
October	9	Gordon Honeycombe	79	Pakistani-English	Actor	The Medusa Touch; The Fourth Protocol; Let's Get Skase
	29	Kenneth Gilbert	84	English	Actor	Twins of Evil; Tomorrow at Ten; Wolfshead: The Legend of Robin Hood

== See also ==
- 2015 in film
- 2015 in British music
- 2015 in British radio
- 2015 in British television
- 2015 in the United Kingdom
- List of 2015 box office number-one films in the United Kingdom
- List of British films of 2014
- List of British films of 2016
