= Mortdecai (film) =

- Theatrical release poster
- Directed by: David Koepp
- Screenplay by: Eric Aronson
- Based on: Don't Point that Thing at Me by Kyril Bonfiglioli
- Produced by: Andrew Lazar; Johnny Depp; Christi Dembrowski; Patrick McCormick; Gigi Pritzker
- Starring: Johnny Depp; Gwyneth Paltrow; Ewan McGregor; Olivia Munn; Jeff Goldblum; Paul Bettany
- Cinematography: Florian Hoffmeister
- Edited by: Jill Savitt; Derek Ambrosi
- Music by: Mark Ronson; Geoff Zanelli
- Production companies: Lionsgate; OddLot Entertainment; Infinitum Nihil; Mad Chance Productions
- Distributed by: Lionsgate
- Release date: January 23, 2015
- Running time: 107 minutes
- Country: United States
- Language: English
- Budget: $60 million
- Box office: $47.3 million

Mortdecai is a 2015 American action comedy film directed by David Koepp and written by Eric Aronson. The film is adapted from the novel series Mortdecai (specifically its 1972 first installment Don't Point that Thing at Me) written by Kyril Bonfiglioli. It stars Johnny Depp in the title role and features Gwyneth Paltrow, Ewan McGregor, Olivia Munn, Paul Bettany and Jeff Goldblum.

Lord Charlie Mortdecai, under crushing debt, goes after a Goya painting, in hopes of getting out of his insolvency.

Released by Lionsgate on January 23, 2015, Mortdecai was a box office flop, grossing $47.3 million against its estimated $60 million budget, and was critically panned.

== Plot ==
Lord Charlie Mortdecai, an 'art dealer' and swindler, is accosted in Hong Kong by one of his victims, the gangster Fang. Jock, Mortdecai's faithful manservant, extricates his master before they can be killed.

Returning to London, Mortdecai and his wife Johanna consider ways to pay off their crushing tax debt. At the same time in Oxford, a painting by Francisco Goya becomes the target of an elaborate theft, resulting in the murder of an art restorer.

Inspector Alistair Martland is put on the case. He, in love with Johanna since college, puts pressure on Mortdecai to assist him. Martland believes the prime suspect to be Emil Strago. Mortdecai agrees to help in exchange for 10% of the insurance money.

Mortdecai interviews people affiliated with the art world, including the art smuggler Spinoza. While they argue, Strago arrives and shoots at them, killing Spinoza; Mortdecai escapes unharmed, although he accidentally shoots Jock in the process.

Johanna meets with 'The Duke', who knows the thief and says that the painting conceals the location of a hoard of Nazi gold. Mortdecai is kidnapped by thugs working for the Russian Romanov because they believe he has the painting. Romanov threatens torture unless Mortdecai surrenders it, but he escapes through a window with Jock.

Martland sends Mortdecai to America to meet with potential Goya buyer Milton Krampf. Planning to sell his beloved Rolls-Royce to the American, he tries to ascertain if Krampf is involved with the theft. After Mortdecai arrives in Los Angeles, Krampf shows him that the Goya was smuggled into the US in the Rolls after it had been stolen from Strago and stashed there.

Krampf invites Mortdecai to the party, where he will show the Goya. Jock and Mortdecai try to steal it during the party, as do Krampf's daughter Georgina and Strago. She attempts to seduce Mortdecai while Strago steals the painting. Johanna arrives with Martland and catches her husband with Georgina.

Mortdecai flees to help Jock steal the painting, but finds Krampf has been murdered by Strago and the painting is gone. Strago is caught, but Georgina helps him escape with the painting. Mortdecai, Jock, Martland and Johanna find them in a motel where Martland sets fire to the Goya, causing the building to explode. It is revealed that the painting was a fake, as the Duke has hidden the real one.

The Mortdecais retrieve the painting, putting it up for auction. The sale attracts Fang and Romanov, whose thugs Mortdecai and Jock waylay. In the auction room, Strago attempts to kidnap Johanna while Mortdecai bids up the 'Goya'. Sir Graham eventually wins it for Romanov and Martland apprehends Strago during the commotion. Sale proceeds pay off their debt, but they are still broke.

The painting is revealed to be another fake, and Romanov plots his revenge whilst his thugs begin to torture Sir Graham.

In the closing scene, the Mortdecais share a bubble bath while admiring the real Goya.

== Cast ==
- Johnny Depp as Charlie Mortdecai
- Ewan McGregor as Inspector Alistair Martland
- Gwyneth Paltrow as Johanna Mortdecai
- Paul Bettany as Jock Strapp
- Jonny Pasvolsky as Emil Strago
- Olivia Munn as Georgina Krampf
- Jeff Goldblum as Milton Krampf
- Michael Culkin as Sir Graham
- Ulrich Thomsen as Romanov
- Alec Utgoff as Dmitri
- Paul Whitehouse as Spinoza
- Michael Byrne as the Duke
- Austin Lyon as Hotel Clerk
- Nicholas Farrell as Auctioneer
- Junix Inocian as Fang Fat

== Production ==
Principal photography and production began in London on October 21, 2013.

Parts of the film were shot on location at Hedsor House in Buckinghamshire in the UK, where Depp, Munn, and Bettany filmed scenes in Hedsor House's Boudoir and Bridal Suites.

Scenes were also shot on location at the National Art Library in the Victoria and Albert Museum in London.

The Goya painting is a pastiche or modern version of the 1805 Portrait of the Marchioness of Santa Cruz (Madrid, Prado Museum).

== Release ==
On April 23, 2014, Lionsgate announced that the film would be released on February 6, 2015. On September 24, 2014, the release date was shifted to January 23, 2015.

=== Marketing and promotion ===
A photo from the film featuring Depp was revealed on May 8, 2014. Four character posters - featuring Depp, Paltrow, McGregor, and Munn with mustaches - were released in November 2014. A promotional tie-in for the film was done by The Art of Shaving, whose store windows showed posters of Depp displaying their razors with the slogan "Handsome Doesn't Just Happen".

The first trailer for the film was released on August 12, attached to The Expendables 3. The second trailer was released on November 12 and was attached to Dumb and Dumber To, The Hunger Games: Mockingjay – Part 1, Horrible Bosses 2, Top Five, and The Gambler.

== Reception ==
=== Box office ===
Mortdecai grossed $7.7 million in North America and $39.6 million in other territories for a worldwide total of $47.3 million, against a production budget of $60 million.

The film was released in North America on January 23, 2015. The film was projected to gross around $10 million from 2,648 theaters in its opening weekend. The film made $1.5 million its first day and went on to gross $4.2 million in its opening weekend, finishing 9th at the box office. In its third week the film was pulled from 2,395 theaters (a 90.4% drop), the 10th biggest theater drop in history at the time.

=== Critical response ===
On Rotten Tomatoes, Mortdecai has an approval rating of 12% based on 110 reviews and an average rating of 3.4/10, making it the lowest-rated film produced by OddLot Entertainment to date. The site's critical consensus reads: "Aggressively strange and willfully unfunny, the misguided Mortdecai sounds a frightfully low note in Johnny Depp's post-Pirates filmography". On Metacritic, the film has a score of 27 out of 100, based on 21 critics, indicating "generally unfavorable reviews". Audiences polled by CinemaScore gave the film an average grade of "C+" on an A+ to F scale.

On Twitter, Robbie Collin of The Daily Telegraph characterised the film as "The Crap Budapest Hotel", elaborating in his review: "Mortdecai: mort de cinéma, more like". Christopher Rosen of The Huffington Post said that Mortdecai "seems destined to be rated as the worst film of 2015, and deservedly so". Reviewing the film in The Guardian, Mark Kermode gave it 1 star out of 5, describing it as "a dismally unfunny comic thriller with only one decent joke". In a negative review for The New York Times, Stephen Holden described the film as "a frantically dull spectacle".

Later, in February 2022, director David Koepp took partial blame for the films' failure: "I only directed something someone else wrote once and it was a misbegotten adventure from the beginning, as much my fault as anybody else’s."

=== Accolades ===
Award	Category	Nominee	Result
Golden Raspberry Award	Worst Actor	Johnny Depp	Nominated
Golden Raspberry Award	Worst Actress	Gwyneth Paltrow	Nominated
Golden Raspberry Award	Worst Screen Combo	Johnny Depp and his glued-on mustache	Nominated
