= Hell's Kitchen (British TV series) series 4 =

Hell's Kitchen
- Season 4
- Presented by: Claudia Winkleman
- No. of days: 15
- No. of contestants: 8
- Winner: Linda Evans
- Runner-up: Adrian Edmondson
- No. of episodes: 15

Release
- Original network: ITV
- Original release: 13 April – 27 April 2009

Series four of the British version of Hell's Kitchen began on 13 April 2009 and finished on 27 April 2009.

== Presenter ==
Angus Deayton did not return to present the show. The reason given for Deayton's dismissal was because he was involved in a series of disputes with head chef Marco Pierre White. Pierre White has discussed the reasons for his disagreements with Deayton, he commented that "His humour was forced, and negative. I would be working hard and he would be making jibes at where I came from and my name".

In March 2009 Claudia Winkleman, whom Marco Pierre White has described as "naturally funny", was confirmed as the new host.

== Head Chef ==
Marco Pierre White returns as Head Chef/teacher for the second series running. He particularly stated in the first episode that he was "the only chef to return".

== Celebrities ==
The eight celebrities taking part in this year's show were confirmed in April 2009:

- Adrian Edmondson, an English actor, comedian, director and writer.
- Anthea Turner, an English journalist, television presenter and media personality, most famous for presenting Blue Peter.
- Bruce Grobbelaar, a former Rhodesian-Zimbabwean-British football goalkeeper.
- Danielle Lineker (née Bux), a Welsh model (and Gary Lineker's wife).
- Grant Bovey, Anthea Turner's husband and a businessman.
- Jody Latham, an actor best known for his work on Channel 4 show Shameless.
- Linda Evans, a Golden Globe-winning and Emmy nominated American actress from the 1980s ABC soap opera Dynasty.
- Niomi McLean-Daley (Ms. Dynamite), a double Brit Award and three time MOBO Awards winning R&B, UK garage, and hip hop singer and rapper.

== Format changes ==
Unlike in past series, this year there is only one kitchen being used in the show.

=== Waiters ===
In another change from previous series, White decides at the end of each night's service who will be a waiter in the next night's service, based on the celebrities' performances in the kitchen that night. Below is a chart showing the waiters for each night's service:

Episode	Episode 1	Episode 2	Episode 3	Episode 4
Waiters	Adrian	Jody	Danielle	Bruce
Waiters	Linda	Grant	Anthea	Niomi

=== Eliminations ===
In previous series the viewers have decided who is eliminated from the show. This year, head chef Marco Pierre White decides who is eliminated, until there are four left. The viewers decide who wins out of the top four.

Key

Winner
Runner-up
Third place
Quit
Eliminated by Marco
Eliminated by public

Rank	Celebrity	Status
1	Linda Evans	Winner (Day 15)
2	Adrian Edmondson	Runner-Up (Day 15)
3	Danielle Lineker	Third Place (Day 13)
4	Niomi McLean-Daley	Eliminated (Day 12)
5	Anthea Turner	Eliminated (Day 11)
6	Bruce Grobbelaar	Quit (Day 10)
7	Grant Bovey	Eliminated (Day 9)
8	Jody Latham	Eliminated (Day 7)

Notes

- The first sacking was supposed to be on day 6 but White decided that Jody deserved 24 hours to redeem himself.
- Due to an outstanding performance Grobbelaar had immunity from being eliminated on day 9.
- On Day 10, Bruce decided to voluntarily leave the show in place of the person that was going to be sacked.
- In a post-show interview, Evans revealed that she chose to participate in Hell's Kitchen in preference to "I'm a Celebrity...Get Me Out of Here! (2008)".

== Television ratings ==
Show	Original Air Date	Overnight Ratings	Audience Share	Peak	Official ratings	Source
Episode 1	April 13	5.03m	20.9%	—	—	
Episode 2	April 15	2.47m	10%	—	—	
Episode 3	April 16	3.54m	15%	—	—	
Episode 4	April 17	3.92m	17.8%	—	—	
Episode 5	April 18	4.68m	21.8%	—	—	
Episode 6	April 19	4.46m	19.5%	—	—	
Episode 7	April 20	4.48m	18.6%	—	—	
Episode 8	April 21	3.58m	15.3%	—	—	
Episode 9	April 22	3.18m	13.3%	—	—	
Episode 10	April 23	4.08m	18.2%	—	—	
Episode 11	April 24	4.03m	17.9%	—	—	
Episode 12	April 25	4.67m	20.9%	—	—	
Episode 13	April 26	3.56m	14.7%	—	—	
Episode 14	April 27	3.38m	14.9%	—	—	
Episode 15	April 27	5.15m	21.3%	—	—	

"—" denotes where information currently unavailable

Average: 4.014 million viewers / 17.34% viewer share
