= Danielle Bux =

Welsh model, television personality and actress

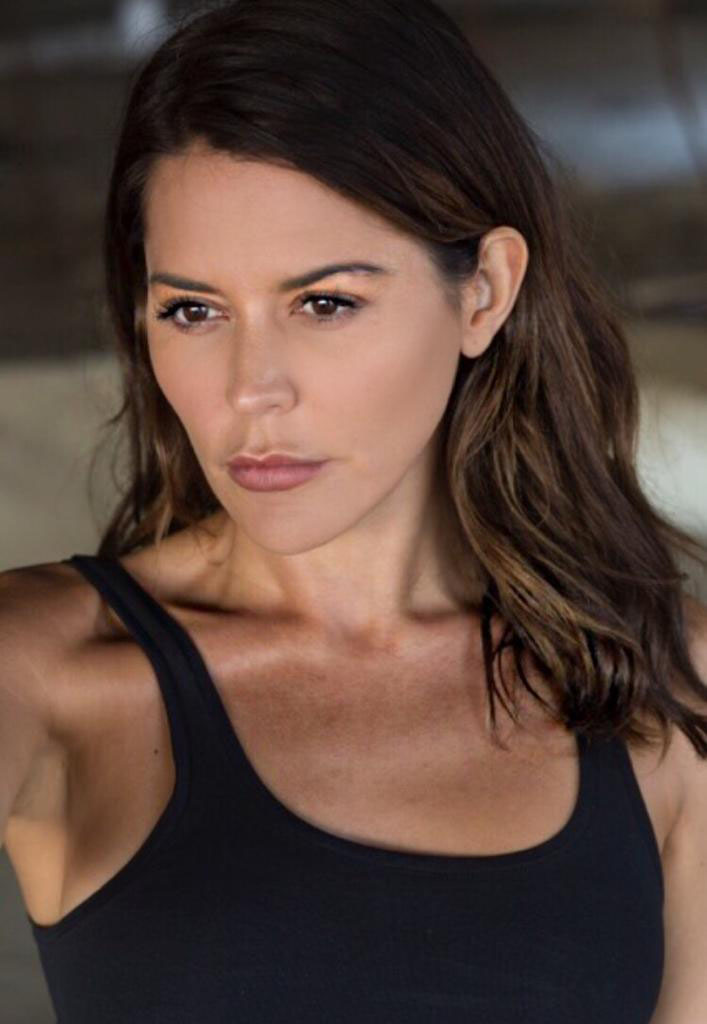
- Bux in 2018
- Born: Danielle Maria Bux; 15 June 1979 (age 47); Cardiff, Wales
- Other name: Danielle Lineker
- Education: Cantonian High School
- Occupations: Actress; model
- Years active: 2009–present
- Spouses: Gary Lineker (m. 2009; div. 2016); Nate Greenwald (m. 2019)
- Children: 2

Danielle Maria Bux (born 15 June 1979) is a Welsh actress and model. She made her modelling debut in 1999 winning a place on the Miss Hawaiian Tropic beauty pageant in Las Vegas. She was married to former England footballer Gary Lineker from 2009 until 2016.

== Early life ==
She was born in Cardiff, Wales, to parents Kim Lewis and Roy Bux. They divorced when she was young. Bux grew up in Cardiff. She has one sister, three brothers, and one half-brother. She attended Cantonian High School in Fairwater, Cardiff. Bux reports that she suffered from racist bullying during her childhood. Her grandfather was from Bengal (present-day Bangladesh).

== Career ==
Bux started modelling as a teenager after winning a place in the Miss Hawaiian Tropic contest in Las Vegas. Whilst modelling part-time, she was a flight attendant with Virgin Atlantic. Becoming a full-time model, she has since appeared on the cover of various magazines including Hello!, OK!, and Maxim.

She assisted Trevor McDonald onstage at the 2008 National TV Awards. She finished in third place in the 2009 series of ITV's Hell's Kitchen. In June and July 2009, she was a guest panellist on ITV's Loose Women.

Bux made her acting debut on the stage at the Bristol Hippodrome in Calendar Girls in 2011. Her television appearances include BBC One drama Silent Witness and Aquarius.

== Personal life ==
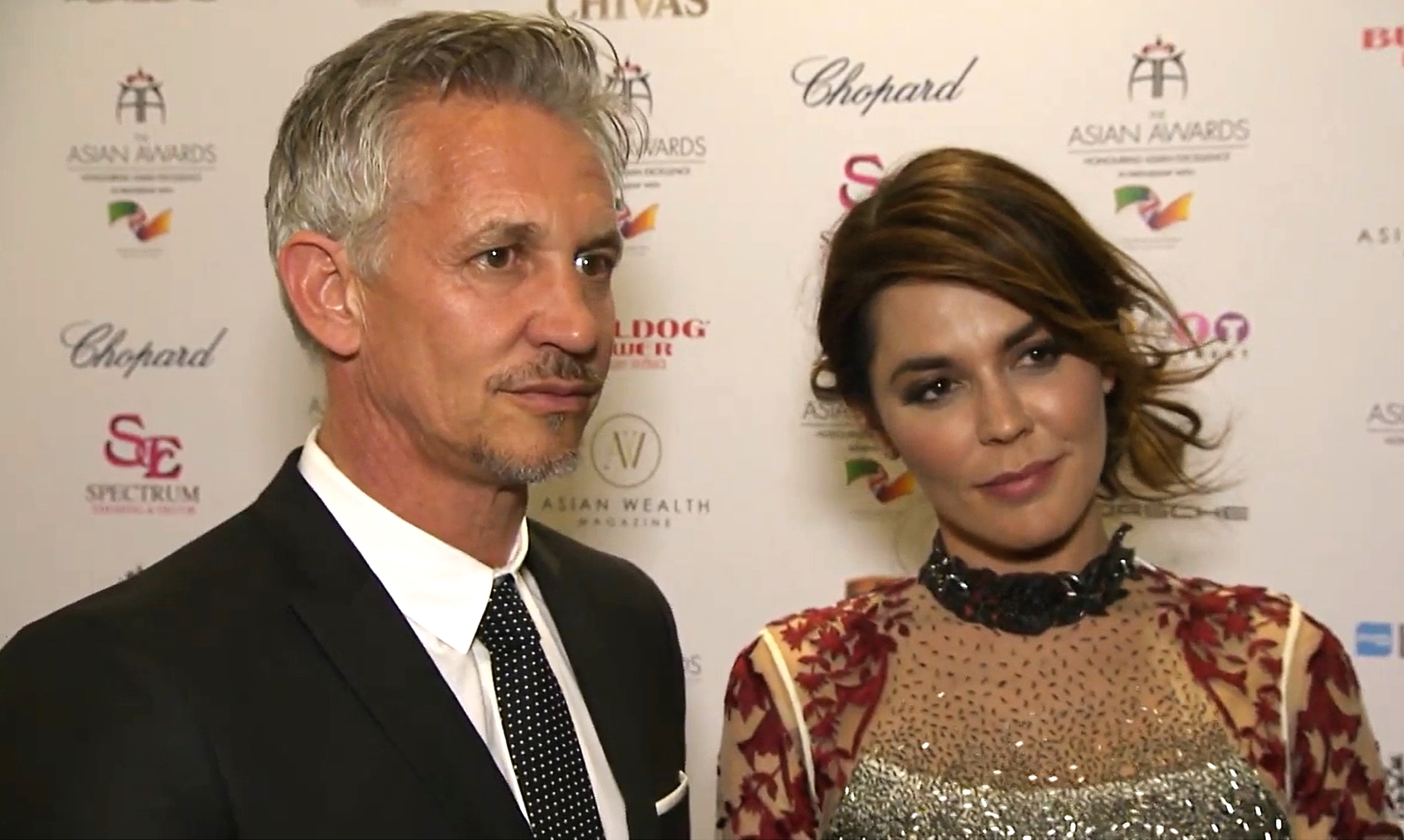
Gary Lineker and Bux at The Asian Awards in 2015

Bux has a daughter from a previous relationship when she was 22. She married Gary Lineker on 2 September 2009, in Ravello, Italy. They went on to win £30,000 for charity on ITV's gameshow Mr and Mrs. On 13 January 2016, Lineker and Bux announced they were divorcing after six years of marriage, the reason given being Lineker not wanting more children.

Bux started a relationship with American entertainment lawyer Nate Greenwald in 2016 and they had a daughter in 2017. They married at a private ceremony at his parents' house in November 2019 on Nantucket Island, Massachusetts.

Bux is a patron of the Nicholls Spinal Injury Foundation. She began fundraising for the charity after her half-brother sustained a life-altering spinal injury from a fall at the age of 22.

=== Filmography ===
Year	Title	Role	Notes
2013	We Are the Freaks	Megan	Feature film
2013	Silent Witness: episode "Trust: Part 2"	Jan Evans	TV series
2015	Kicking Off	Philippa	Film
2015	Aquarius: episode "(Please Let Me Love You And) It Won't Be Wrong"	Louise Mitchell	TV series
2015	Curse of the Witching Tree	Isobel Redwood	Indie film
2015	One Thing Left to Do	Summer	Indie film
2019	The Wedding Year	Megan	Film
