= Afua's Diary =

- Directed by: Ben Owusu
- Written by: Bibi Owusu Shadbolt
- Produced by: Bibi Owusu Shadbolt
- Starring: Cleopatra Wood, Fabio Abraham
- Release date: 2015
- Country: United Kingdom

Afua's Diary is a 2015 romantic drama-comedy, written and produced by Bibi Owusu Shadbolt and directed by Ben Owusu. It stars Cleopatra Wood and Fabio Abraham and features Kwaku Sintim-Misa, Franciska Bijou Steiner and Zion Johnson in supporting roles.

Inspired by true life events, the movie deals with the subject of love, destiny and the effects of immigration on diaspora communities.

== Synopsis ==
Afua Forson Brown is a Ghanaian Marketing Graduate going through trials and tribulations as her British student visa runs out. Her situation is made worse by the constant nagging by her boyfriend and the persistent demands from her alcoholic father in Ghana. Afua eventually falls in love with a dashing man but love only seems to complicate her situation.

== Cast ==
- Cleopatra Wood as Afua Forson Brown
- Fabio Abraham as Alan Freeman
- Kwaku Sintim-Misa as Mr. forson
- Bijou Franciska Steiner as Carla
- Zion Johnson as Zach
- Alexander Arthur as Michael
- Nataylia Roni, as Tracey
- Louis Hyde as Robert
- Richard Goble as Mr. Mackintosh

== Reception ==
The film was first screened at the Odeon cinema in Greenwich, and generally received good reviews; Lisa Turner of Brand Weekly described it as a new era of British-African cinema and commended the great chemistry between Cleopatra Wood and Kwaku Sintim-Misa. Guestlist's Noelle Asiedu praised the writing, directing and editing. Descantdeb, writing for the British blacklist, however did not think the film was ready for the general public yet. According to her, there were issues with sound and the dialogues did not flow naturally from the lips of some of the actors.

== Accolades ==
After the first screening, Afua's Diary got immediate endorsement by the National Film Awards, and was nominated for Screen Nation Film and Television Awards in February 2015. The film has also been selected for inclusion in the Pan African film festival in Cannes.
