= Kyril Bonfiglioli =

British cult novelist (1928–1985)

Kyril Bonfiglioli (born Cyril Emmanuel George Bonfiglioli; 29 May 1928 – 3 March 1985) was a British art dealer, magazine editor and comic novelist. His eccentric and witty Mortdecai novels have gained a following since his death.

== Biography ==
Bonfiglioli was born in Eastbourne on the south coast of England to an Italo-Slovene father, Emmanuel Bonfiglioli, and an English mother, Dorothy née Pallett. His mother and brother died in an air raid when he was 14. Having served in the British Army from 1947 to 1954, and being widowed, he applied to Balliol College, Oxford, where he took his degree. After his divorce from his second wife, he lived in Silverdale in Lancashire, then in Jersey and Ireland. With Keith Roberts, he edited Science Fantasy magazine for a period from 1964 to 1966, appointed by David Warburton of Roberts and Vinter Ltd.; and the successor Impulse for its first few issues in 1966 before handing the reins to Harry Harrison. He died in Jersey of cirrhosis in 1985, having had five children.

He described himself as "an accomplished fencer, a fair shot with most weapons and a serial marrier of beautiful women ... abstemious in all things except drink, food, tobacco and talking ... and loved and respected by all who knew him slightly."

== Charlie Mortdecai novels ==
Bonfiglioli wrote four books featuring Charlie Mortdecai, three of which were published in his lifetime, and one posthumously as completed by the satirist and parodist Craig Brown. Charlie Mortdecai is the fictional art dealer anti-hero of the series. His Mortdecai comic-thriller trilogy received critical plaudits back in the 1970s and early 1980s. The dry satire and black humour of the books were favourably reviewed by The New Yorker and others. The books are still in print and have been translated into several languages. The books "attract a devoted cult following and are consistently praised by a wide variety of publications", although Sadie Stein in The Paris Review said that "readers are pretty much evenly divided between those who relish the books' unflinching, un-PC meanness, and those who are appalled". Stein says that "The books are kind of like Jeeves and Wooster stories ... if Wooster were a psychotic, misogynistic art dealer with a weight problem. Or maybe he's more a sociopath or just a pathological narcissist. ... he's definitely amoral, and he certainly hates women."

Don't Point That Thing At Me was awarded the 1973 CWA New Blood Dagger for the best crime novel by a hitherto unpublished writer.

Actors Stephen Fry and Hugh Laurie are among those who are fans of his work. Hugh Laurie praised "the excellent Kyril Bonfigliolo" [sic] in the afternotes of his book The Gun Seller.

The three original books, published out of chronological order:

- Don't Point That Thing At Me (Weidenfeld and Nicolson, 1972), Book One

Reissued (Penguin, 2015 ISBN 978-0-241-97267-0) as film tie-in under title Mortdecai

- After You With The Pistol (Secker and Warburg, 1979), Book Two
- Something Nasty In The Woodshed (Macmillan, 1976), Book Three

Anthologised in:

- The Mortdecai Trilogy (Black Spring Press, 1991)

An historical prequel about one of Charlie's Dutch ancestors:

- All the Tea in China (Secker and Warburg, 1978)

The posthumously completed sequel:

- The Great Mortdecai Moustache Mystery completed by Craig Brown (Black Spring Press, 1999)

Bonfiglioli's second wife Margaret wrote and compiled a posthumous anthology of works and anecdotes, called The Mortdecai ABC (London: Penguin / Viking, 2001), ISBN 0-670-91084-8.

=== 2015 film ===
Mortdecai, a film based on the books directed by David Koepp and starring Johnny Depp in the title role, was released in January 2015. The film was a box office bomb, and received overwhelmingly negative reviews. The Rotten Tomatoes aggregated rating for the movie stands at just 12%.
