= Soldiers of the Damned =

- Directed by: Mark Nuttall
- Produced by: Nigel Horne; Stephen Rigg
- Cinematography: James Martin
- Edited by: Tom Grimshaw; Ian Moore
- Music by: Tug
- Distributed by: Safecracker Pictures
- Release date: 8 August 2015
- Running time: 101 minutes
- Country: United Kingdom
- Languages: English; Russian
- Box office: US$27,267

Soldiers of the Damned is a 2015 British war horror film.

== Plot ==
In 1944 Romania, the Wehrmacht is being steadily pushed back by the Red Army. A Wehrmacht squad led by Major Kurt Fleischer are engaged in heavy fighting while Fleischer is summoned for a new and dangerous mission. Fleischer is ordered to take Professor Anna Kappel from the Ahnenerbe together with SS Sturmbannführer Heinrich Metzger into a forest, widely believed to be haunted, to find some ancient relic. Fleischer is dubious about the mission, all the more so because Kappel is his former lover while Metzger is his enemy, but complies.

Upon entering the forest, Fleischer and his men encounter a Red Army squad fleeing in terror from some unseen enemy and gun down all of the Russians except for the sniper Natalya Kovalenko. The sniper Dieter Baum chases after her and during a struggle, she dissolves into dust. Metzger catches glimpses of ethereal beings dressed in white robes that are watching the group. The demented SS Standartenführer Ackermann is found wandering the forest and he warns them all to leave before he is shot down. Fleischer and his men find the body of professor Bernd Dietrich of the Ahnenerbe crushed by a tank in part of the forest where it is impossible for tanks to operate. As various strange events take place, tensions rise between Fleischer and Metzger. Fleischer tells his adjunct Fuchs that it would be better for Germany to lose the war rather to ruled by men like Metzger whom it is revealed to have hanged a number of Jewish children a few weeks earlier. Fleischer discovers that there was a previous mission into the forest led by Dietrich and Ackermann that had disappeared and confronts Kappel. She tells him that Dietrich was convinced of the existence of a race of "Aryan god-men", described as superhuman beings with god-like powers who have been living in the forest for millions of years, and the purpose of the mission is to find a relic that will permit the SS to have the "god-men" use their powers to help the Reich win the war.

One by one, Fleischer's men are killed in strange and horrible ways. At night, voices speaking in an unknown language are heard in the forest. Fleischer becomes convinced that the "god-men" are real, and are thoroughly malevolent beings who kill for the pleasure of killing. After seeing their power, Metzger wants the power of the "god-men" for himself. Fuchs is taken by the "god-men" to a point in time in the past where he encounters the mission led by Ackerman and Dietrich and learns that Kappel is a senior director at the Ahnenerbe while taking the relic with him. In the present, the dying Fuchs arrives at an enormous stone complex in the forest, where he writes a warning in his own blood.

Fleischer, Kappel and Metzger arrive at the same complex and find the relic that Fuchs brought with him. Fleischer fights Metzger to keep him from possessing the relic (which is never seen directly, but emits a green light from the bag it is placed in), and ultimately kills him. Fleischer tells Kappel to bury the relic, but instead she tries to kill him as she believes that the "god-men" will remake her into their image, giving her the same god-like powers. The "god-men" intervene to kill Kappel as she unwillingly plunges her knife into her heart. Fleischer buries the relic and leaves the forest a prematurely aged man. A group of Red Army soldiers encounter and kill him.

== Cast ==
- Gil Darnell as Major Kurt Fleischer
- Miriam Cooke as Professor Anna Kappel
- Lucas Hansen as SS Sturmbannführer Heinrich Metzger
- Tom Sawyer as Lieutenant Erich Fuchs
- Jason Kennedy as Private Dieter Baum
- Mark Fountain as Private Rolf Nadel
- Matthew John Morley as Sergeant Nicholas Lang
- Nicholas Keith as SS Obersturmführer Sven Jung
- Nicky Bell as Private Carl Scherer
- Renny Krupinski as Colonel Schwab
- Alan French as SS Standartenführer Ernst Ackermann
- Andonis Anthony as Sergeant Hugo Dresner
- Natalia Ryumina as Natalya Kovalenko
- Andrei Zayats as Sergeant Yartzin
- Stuart Adam as Professor Bernd Dietrich
- James Patrick as Private Verner Trommler
- Oleg Hill as Major Lukov
- Yuri Klimov as Major Koshkin
- Hanna Wolfe as Romanian girl

== Production ==
The film was shot in April–May 2013 in Cumbria and North Yorkshire.

== Reception ==
The critic Howard Gorman praised the film for its "particularly authentic feel", but felt the decision to have the German characters played by a mostly British cast speak with English accents to be highly distracting. Gorman wrote that performances varied as he accused some of the actors of overacting. Gorman concluded: "Flaws aside, for a first-time feature, Nuttall definitely proves himself a deft hand in the director’s chair, turning the woodland setting into a genuinely effective haunting ground. By creating some particularly unsettling set pieces on a skimpy budget, the nightmarish nature of the setting is by far the film’s salvation. Consequently, Soldiers of the Damned does manage to muster up a pretty grisly depiction of Second World War gore fare, something which is also bolstered by a classic war film soundtrack that not only adds to the whole WWII feel, but also conjures up much more fear and bloodshed in the audience’s mind than is effectively shown on the screen."

The critic Robert Monk in a favorable review wrote: "What, on first glance, looks to be a dumb horror dress-up show turns out to be far more effective than that. There is a genuine sense of mystery played out in the woodland, and the two leads Darnell and Cooke imbue their characters and the plot as a whole with a real urgency and drama...The real success of the film is just that, the ability to play up the mysterious elements without needing any unnecessary explanation. There is a lot of rampaging and panic-stricken running around, but when the supernatural elements start getting weirder and weirder, its good to know there aren’t any easy answers."

In mixed review, the critic John Townshend wrote: "Ancient spirits and the existence of a pure Aryan race are foremost in the minds of the SS here, which does make a change from the usual zombies-in-uniforms genre staple. There is also the added tensions created by the blinkered, and satisfyingly unlikeable, SS officers mixing with regular German soldiers. While this sub-plot is not entirely successful, it being a little too obvious at times in its conflict, it gives the film more depth, offering a different dynamic to the usual good versus evil stand-off. There is also a style to Soldiers of the Damned that gives the film an almost arthouse aesthetic. The woodlands in which the soldiers find themselves are bleached in appearance, giving them an uncomfortably sinister quality generating a haunted atmosphere that seems to linger in the background of every shot." However, Townshend complained that much of the dialogue was awkward, the acting was often "frustratingly clunky" and many of the characters were too stereotypical.

The critic Charlotte Stear wrote that the film began as a war film, but veered into a horror film, which she felt was an "interesting juxtaposition". Stear wrote: "As the soldiers get lost in the woods their descent into madness is depicted well by their surroundings. The woods are spectacular and create an ominous feel that help the film shift mood, it is intriguing and rather claustrophobic and without them the second half of the film would not work so well, the cinematography captures this gloominess beautifully".
