= Curse of the Witching Tree =

Curse Of The Witching Tree
- Directed by: James Crow
- Written by: James Crow
- Produced by: Lucinda Rhodes-Flaherty
- Starring: Sarah Rose Denton; Lucy Clarvis; Lawrence Weller; Danielle Bux; Jon Campling
- Cinematography: James Crow
- Edited by: James Crow
- Music by: Pete Coleman
- Distributed by: 4Digital Media
- Release date: 18 May 2015
- Running time: 102 minutes
- Country: United Kingdom
- Language: English

Curse Of The Witching Tree is a 2015 British independent horror film, written and directed by James Crow. The film was his debut feature. It was filmed in the South East of England, in the county of Kent. It stars Sarah Rose Denton, Lucy Clarvis and Lawrence Weller, also starring Danielle Bux as the eponymous witch Isobel Redwood. Production on the film began in May 2014, and was released on DVD in the United Kingdom on 18 May 2015 and 19 May 2015 in the United States.

== Plot ==
An innocent woman, accused of murdering her son and hanged as a witch, curses a tree and the children who play around it. The effects of this act of revenge echo through the years and centuries, and restless spirits haunt the house where the bodies of the cursed children have been buried. A family move into their new home, and begin to uncover the terrible truth behind The Witching Tree and the murdered children upon which they unknowingly sleep.

== Cast ==
- Sarah Rose Denton - Amber Thorson
- Lucy Clarvis - Emma Thorson
- Lawrence Weller - Jake Thorson
- Jon Campling - Father Flanagan
- Danielle Bux - Isobel Redwood
- Caroline Boulton - Eva
- Lydia Breden-Thorpe - Lily
- Ben Greaves-Neil - Merrick

== Reception ==
Starburst Magazine gave the film 7/10 stars, and reviewer John Townsend stated "Curse Of The Witching Tree displays a clear understanding of the horror genre while demonstrating an ability to bring a recognisable yet different approach to the age old theme of witchcraft". while Haddonfield Horror writer David Martin called the film a "masterpiece" and said the film "is going to be labelled a modern day cult classic", and was hailed as better than The Conjuring by one reviewer. While others criticized the low budget nature of the film and gratuitous use of jump scares and inclusion of heavy drama from the main characters. Reviewers were divided on the cast with many praising the quality of child acting, with others relating it to children's programming.
