= Mortdecai =

Novels series by Kyril Bonfiglioli

Mortdecai is a series of comic thriller novels written by English author Kyril Bonfiglioli. The book series deals with the picaresque adventures of a dissolute aristocratic art dealer named Charlie Mortdecai, accompanied on his adventures by his manservant Jock. The books consisted of Don't Point That Thing at Me, After You with the Pistol, Something Nasty in the Woodshed and The Great Mortdecai Moustache Mystery. The books have been translated into several languages including Spanish, French, Italian, German and Japanese. First published in the 1970s, the novels have been described as having cult status, although a writer in The Paris Review said that "readers are pretty much evenly divided between those who relish the books' unflinching, un-PC meanness, and those who are appalled".

== Synopsis ==
=== The Mortdecai Trilogy ===
Published out of chronological order

==== Don't Point that Thing at Me (1972) ====
(Reissued 2015 as Mortdecai in a film tie-in edition)

Mortdecai embroils himself in a plot with a stolen Goya and the blackmail of a highly placed social figure. He manages to get Martland to have him issued with a diplomatic passport in order to secretly take the Goya to his buyer, Krampf, in America. However, Krampf is dead, and Mortdecai is in over his head. The book ends with Mortdecai apparently killing his manservant Jock and going out in a shoot-out with Martland and Martland's men.

The book was awarded the 1973 CWA New Blood Dagger for the best crime novel by a hitherto unpublished writer.

==== After You with the Pistol (1979) ====
Johanna coerces Mortdecai into marriage and a plot to assassinate the Queen of the United Kingdom.

==== Something Nasty in the Woodshed (1976) ====
Mortdecai travels to the isle of Jersey amidst his increasing unpopularity, and becomes embroiled in the manhunt for a rapist.

=== Related books ===
==== All the Tea in China (1978) ====
A historical prequel about one of Charlie's Dutch ancestors, Karli Mortdecai Van Cleef. Partly inspired by The China Clippers by Basil Lubbock.

==== The Great Mortdecai Moustache Mystery (1999) ====
Unfinished due to Bonfiglioli's death, the book was completed by Craig Brown. Another international chase climaxes in a showdown in Buckinghamshire.

== Publication ==
The first three novels were collected as The Mortdecai Trilogy. The book was published by Black Spring Press in 1991. Bonfiglioli's second wife Margaret Bonfiglioli wrote and compiled a posthumous anthology of works and anecdotes, called The Mortdecai ABC (ISBN 0-670-91084-8 UK: Penguin / Viking, 2001). Three of the Mortdecai titles are also featured in Fish Who Answer the Telephone, a compendium of bizarre books and titles.

== Film adaptation ==
Don't Point That Thing at Me was adapted into a feature film by Lionsgate, with Johnny Depp in the title role. David Koepp directed the film on a script by Eric Aronson. The film was released on 23 January 2015, but was a critical and commercial failure.
