= List of frequent David Lynch collaborators =

Filmmaking collaborations

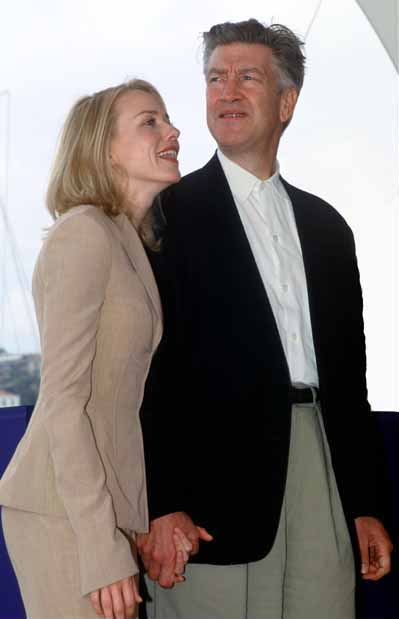
Lynch worked with Naomi Watts on several projects, including Mulholland Drive, Rabbits and Twin Peaks: The Return.

David Lynch (January 20, 1946 – January 15, 2025) was an American filmmaker, painter, television director, visual artist, musician, and occasional actor. Known for his surrealist films, he developed his own unique cinematic style, known as "Lynchian"; this style is characterized by its dream imagery and meticulous sound design. The surreal and, in many cases, violent elements to his films have been said to "disturb, offend or mystify" their audiences.

Over the course of Lynch's career, he collaborated with several individuals on multiple occasions; his films frequently feature recurring cast members and principal production roles are often filled by a small pool of collaborators. The most prolific of Lynch's frequently used actors was Jack Nance, who first worked with Lynch on 1977's Eraserhead, and would appear in many more of Lynch's productions until Nance's death in 1996. Several individuals with whom Lynch would work on multiple occasions are fellow alumni of the AFI Conservatory, including sound designer Alan Splet, cinematographer Frederick Elmes and actor Catherine E. Coulson.

Lynch was known to allow his collaborative partners a large degree of control over their roles when working with him; Kyle MacLachlan several times persuaded Lynch to rewrite scenes, including in 1986's Blue Velvet and the television series Twin Peaks, as he felt they were not right for his characters. The following lists include all of the cast and crew members with whom Lynch worked on three or more separate projects.

== Cast ==
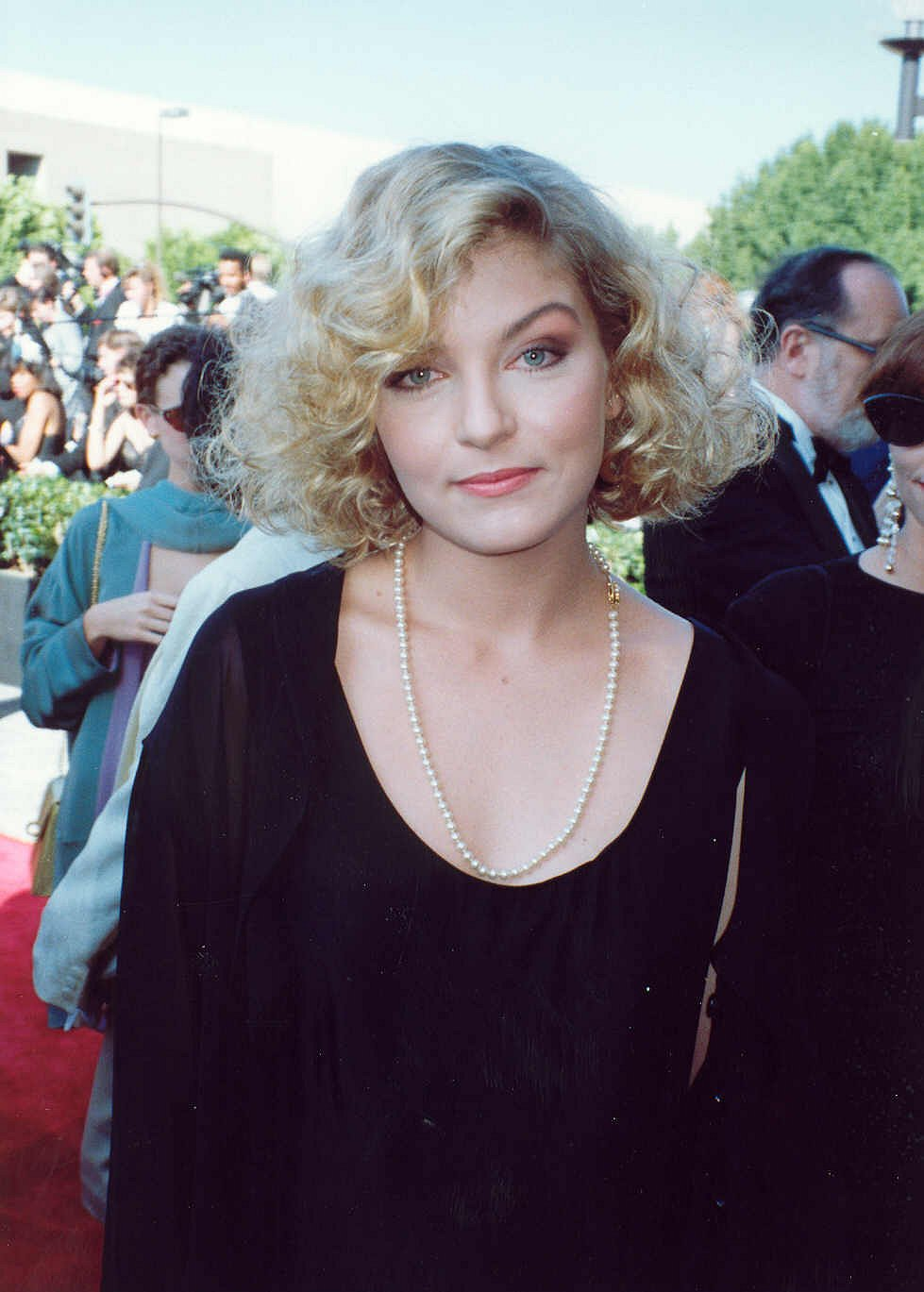
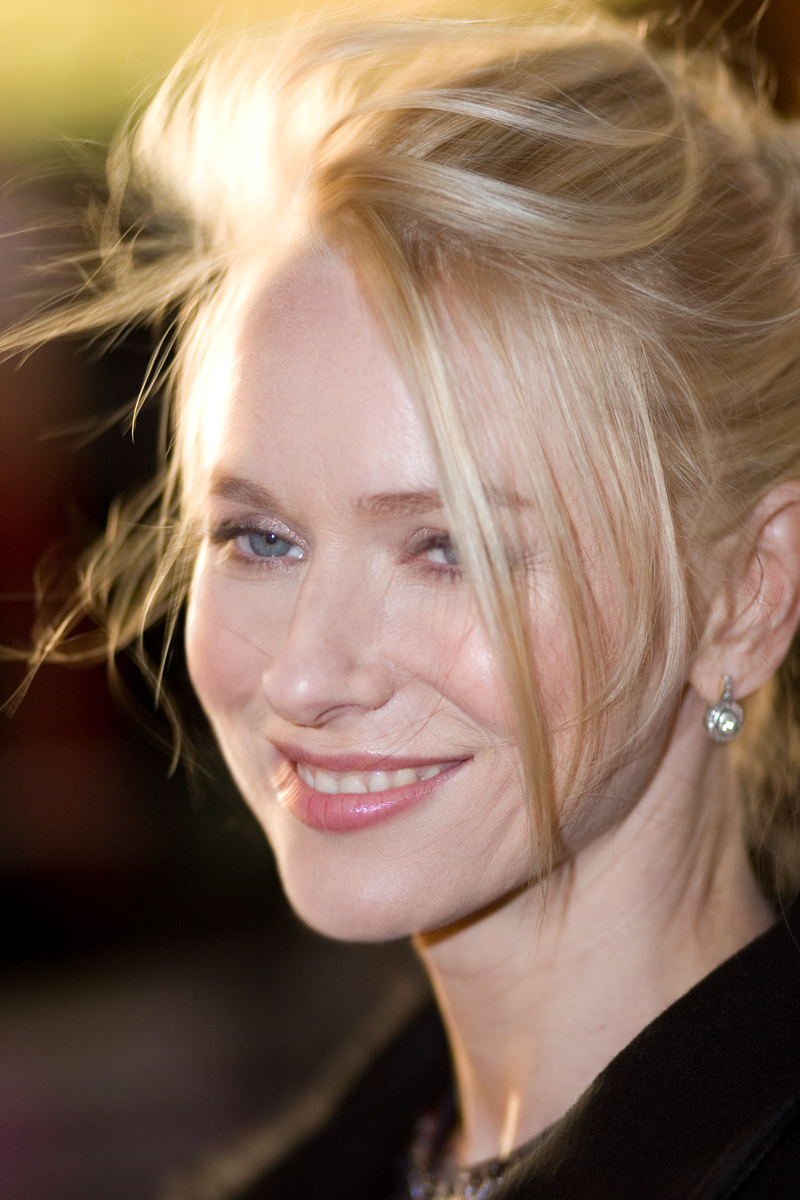
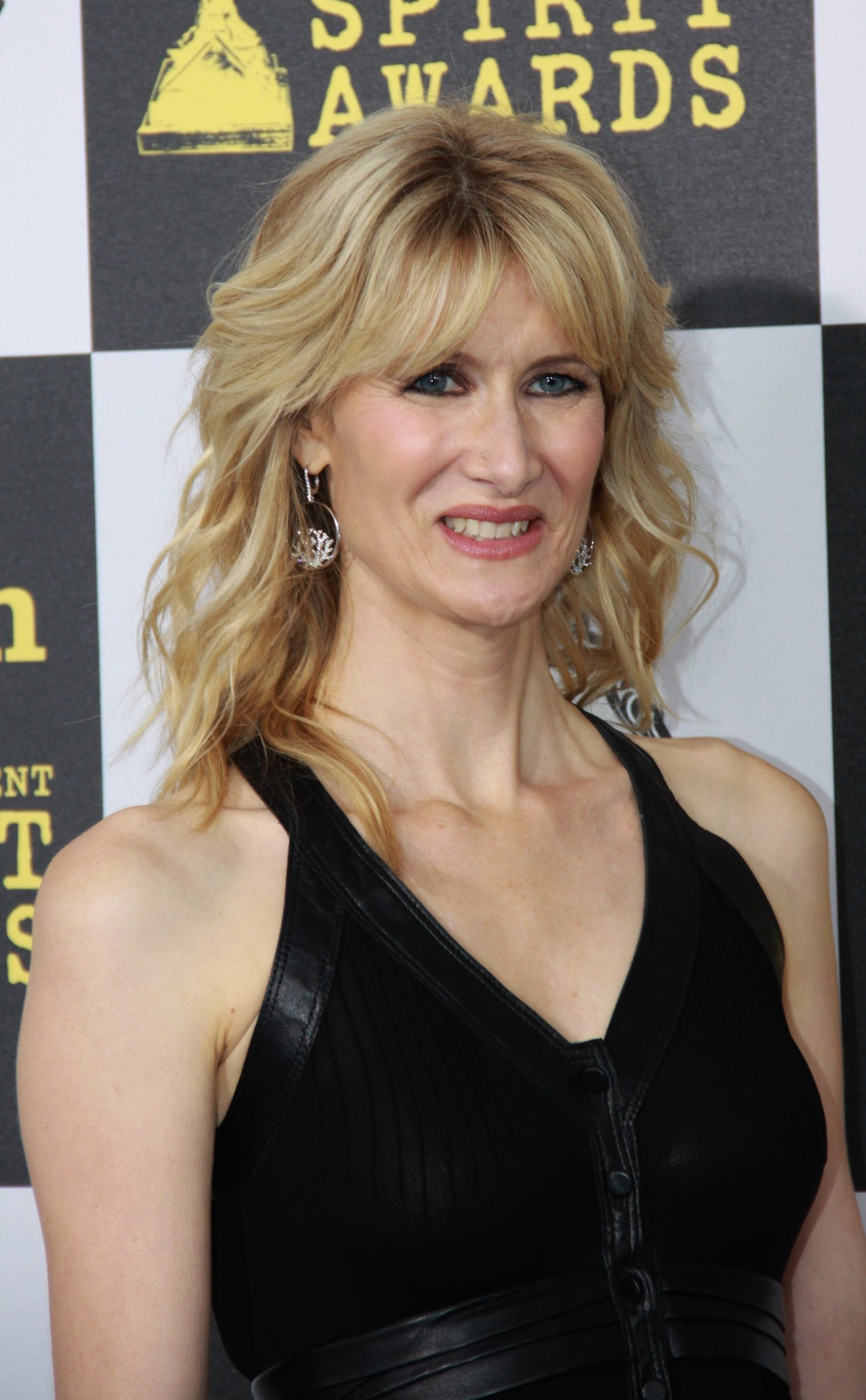
Lynch cast Sheryl Lee (left), Naomi Watts (center) and Laura Dern (right) in several projects each. Lee first worked with Lynch in Twin Peaks before appearing in two feature films, while Lynch personally lobbied for Dern to win the Academy Award for Best Actress for their third collaboration, Inland Empire.

Lynch's partnership with actress Laura Dern spans three feature films, and was later included on a list of "40 Great Actor & Director Partnerships" by the film magazine Empire. Lynch personally lobbied for Dern to win the Academy Award for Best Actress for her role in Inland Empire, sitting by a corner of Sunset Boulevard in Hollywood, California, with a cow to raise awareness of her performance. However, the campaign was unsuccessful, with Dern not receiving a nomination for the award.

Lynch also worked with actor Kyle MacLachlan on several projects; MacLachlan has been described as an on-screen incarnation of Lynch's own persona. The pair's working relationship has also been compared to that between director François Truffaut and actor Jean-Pierre Léaud. MacLachlan has commented that he felt "unstoppable" working with Lynch on Twin Peaks due to the strength of their prior collaborations, and considers the director a personal friend, even describing their relationship, "David Lynch plucked me from obscurity. He cast me as the lead in Dune and Blue Velvet, and people have seen me as this boy-next-door-cooking-up-something-weird-in-the-basement ever since." MacLachlan earned several award nominations through these collaborative efforts, including two Primetime Emmy Award for Outstanding Lead Actor in a Drama Series nominations, and a successful Golden Globe Award for Best Actor in a Television Drama.

Actress Sheryl Lee was first cast as the deceased character Laura Palmer in Twin Peaks. However, Lynch soon asked her to play the second role of Madeline Ferguson throughout the series; Lee would reprise her role as Palmer in the series' feature-film sequel Twin Peaks: Fire Walk with Me, and made a brief appearance in Wild at Heart, which was filmed concurrently with Twin Peaks. Wild at Heart featured several other Twin Peaks alumni, including Grace Zabriskie, David Patrick Kelly and Jack Nance.

Work Actor	1973	1977	1980	1984	1986	1987	1990			1991	1992	1993	1997	1999	2001	2002	2006	2017	—N/a
Work Actor	The Amputee	Eraserhead	The Elephant Man	Dune	Blue Velvet	The Cowboy and the Frenchman	Twin Peaks	Wild at Heart	Industrial Symphony No. 1	On the Air	Twin Peaks: Fire Walk with Me	Hotel Room	Lost Highway	The Straight Story	Mulholland Drive	Rabbits	Inland Empire	Twin Peaks: The Return	Total
Michael J. Anderson							Yes		Yes		Yes				Yes				4
Frances Bay					Yes		Yes	Yes			Yes								4
Scott Coffey								Yes					Yes		Yes	Yes	Yes	Yes	6
Catherine E. Coulson	Yes						Yes				Yes							Yes	4
Rebekah Del Rio															Yes	Yes		Yes	3
Laura Dern					Yes			Yes	Yes								Yes	Yes	5
Miguel Ferrer							Yes			Yes	Yes							Yes	4
Sherilyn Fenn							Yes	Yes										Yes	3
Laura Harring															Yes	Yes	Yes		3
Freddie Jones			Yes	Yes				Yes		Yes		Yes							5
Sheryl Lee							Yes	Yes			Yes							Yes	4
Bellina Logan							Yes			Yes							Yes	Yes	4
Kyle MacLachlan				Yes	Yes		Yes				Yes							Yes	5
Everett McGill				Yes			Yes							Yes				Yes	4
David Patrick Kelly							Yes	Yes										Yes	3
Jack Nance		Yes		Yes	Yes	Yes	Yes	Yes					Yes						7
Harry Dean Stanton						Yes		Yes			Yes	Yes		Yes			Yes	Yes	7
Charlotte Stewart		Yes					Yes											Yes	3
Naomi Watts															Yes	Yes	Yes	Yes	4
Alicia Witt				Yes			Yes					Yes						Yes	4
Grace Zabriskie							Yes	Yes			Yes						Yes	Yes	5

== Crew ==
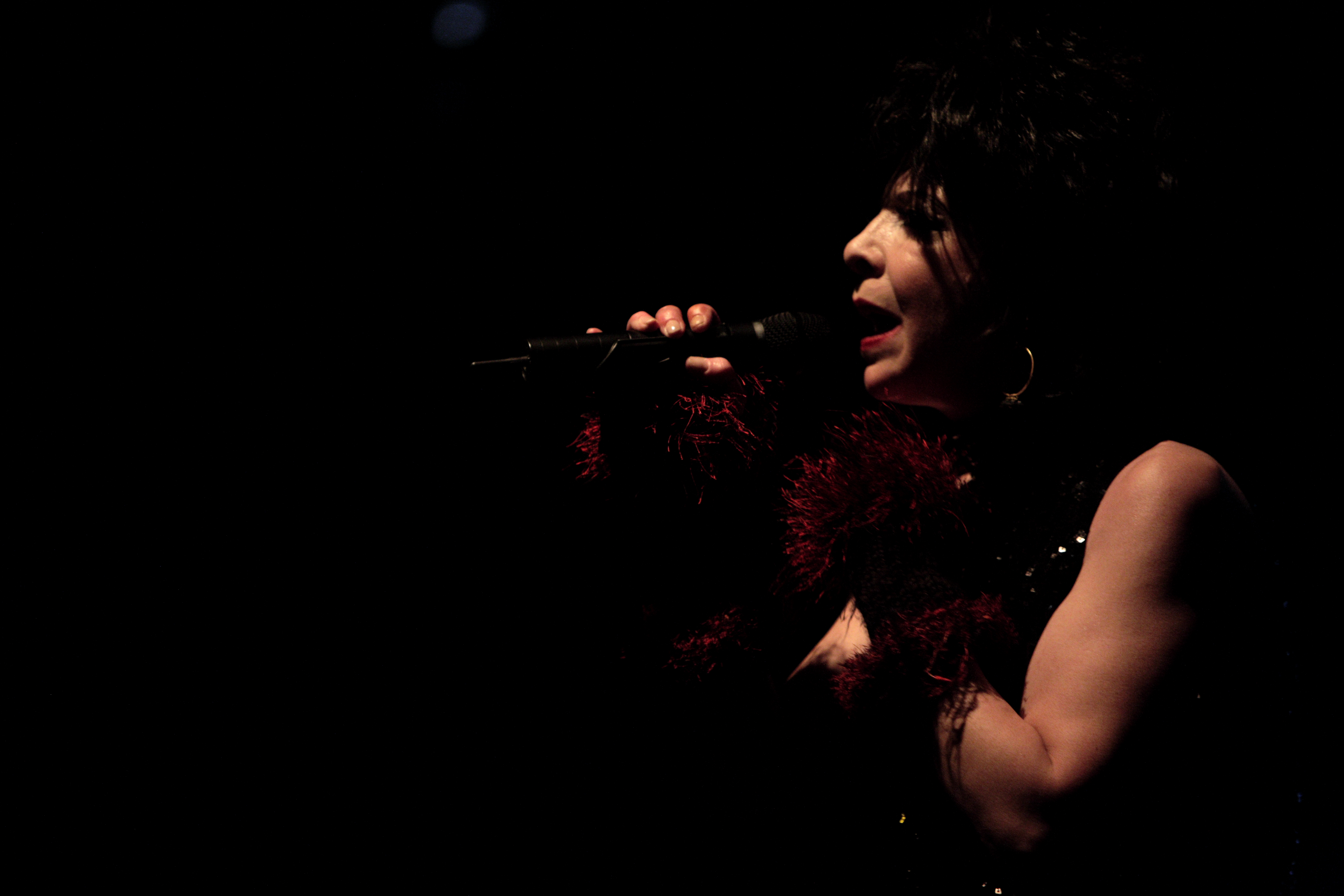
As well as providing music for several of Lynch's projects, Julee Cruise worked with him on two studio albums.

Lynch repeatedly used certain crewmembers on his films, so much that they have been called his "Lynch mob". He worked with Angelo Badalamenti on a large number of projects, having first collaborated with the composer on Blue Velvet in 1986. Lynch and Badalamenti also worked to write and produce two albums for singer Julee Cruise, penning music for 1989's Floating into the Night. and 1993's The Voice of Love. Cruise also joined the pair in crafting the music for Blue Velvet, Twin Peaks and Industrial Symphony No. 1.

Casting director Johanna Ray worked with Lynch on multiple projects, beginning with Blue Velvet and continuing through the majority of Lynch's feature films, missing only The Straight Story. Ray's son Eric Da Re was also involved in Twin Peaks, as an actor. Lynch also worked with sound designer Alan Splet several times until the latter's death in 1994.

Lynch worked with cinematographers Frederick Elmes and Freddie Francis on several occasions, employing both at once on Dune. Lynch and Elmes began collaborating while attending the AFI Conservatory, producing The Amputee and Eraserhead together while studying there. Fancis first worked with the director on The Elephant Man, later acting as cinematographer for Dune and The Straight Story. Peter Deming has also become director of photography in several of Lynch's productions, first on the television series On the Air, before making his first feature film work with Lynch on Lost Highway.

Work Individual	1973	1977	1980	1984	1986	1987	1990			1991	1992	1993	1997	1999	2001	2002		2006	2017	—N/a
Work Individual	The Amputee	Eraserhead	The Elephant Man	Dune	Blue Velvet	The Cowboy and the Frenchman	Twin Peaks	Wild at Heart	Industrial Symphony No. 1	On the Air	Twin Peaks: Fire Walk with Me	Hotel Room	Lost Highway	The Straight Story	Mulholland Drive	Darkened Room	Rabbits	Inland Empire	Twin Peaks: The Return	Total
Angelo Badalamenti (Composer)					Yes		Yes	Yes	Yes	Yes	Yes	Yes	Yes	Yes	Yes	Yes	Yes		Yes	13
Julee Cruise (Musician)					Yes		Yes		Yes		Yes								Yes	5
Peter Deming (Cinematographer)										Yes		Yes	Yes		Yes				Yes	5
Duwayne Dunham (Editor)					Yes		Yes	Yes											Yes	4
Frederick Elmes (Cinematographer)	Yes	Yes		Yes	Yes	Yes		Yes												6
Freddie Francis (Cinematographer)			Yes	Yes										Yes						3
Ron Garcia (Cinematographer)							Yes			Yes	Yes									3
Deepak Nayar (Producer; assistant director)								Yes		Yes	Yes	Yes	Yes							5
Patricia Norris (Costume/production designer)			Yes		Yes	Yes	Yes	Yes			Yes	Yes	Yes	Yes						9
Johanna Ray (Casting director)					Yes	Yes	Yes	Yes		Yes	Yes	Yes	Yes		Yes			Yes	Yes	11
Alan Splet (Sound designer)		Yes	Yes	Yes	Yes															4
Mary Sweeney (Editor, producer)					Yes		Yes	Yes			Yes	Yes	Yes	Yes	Yes			Yes		9

== Footnotes ==
=== References ===
- Hughes, David (2001). The Complete Lynch. Virgin. ISBN 9780753-505984.
- Odell, Colin; Le Blanc, Michelle (2007). David Lynch. Kamera Books. ISBN 978-1-84243-225-9.
- Olson, Greg (2008). Beautiful Dark (illustrated ed.). Lanham: Scarecrow Press. ISBN 978-0-8108-5917-3.
- Rodley, Chris; Lynch, David (2005). Lynch on Lynch (2nd ed.). London: Macmillan. ISBN 0-571-22018-5.
