= Jennifer Syme =

American actress, assistant (1972–2001)

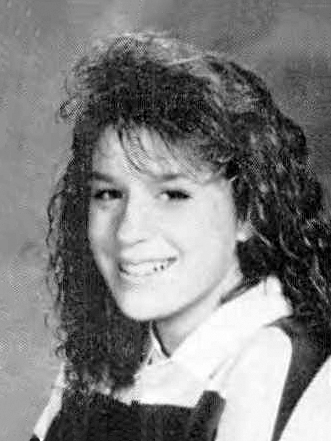
- High school yearbook portrait, 1988
- Born: Jennifer Maria Syme; December 7, 1972; Pico Rivera, California, U.S.
- Died: April 2, 2001 (aged 28); Los Angeles, California, U.S.
- Burial place: Westwood Memorial Park, Los Angeles, Los Angeles County, California
- Occupations: Actress; personal assistant; record company executive
- Years active: 1993–2001
- Partner: Keanu Reeves (1998–2000, 2001)
- Children: 1 (Note: Stillborn.)

Jennifer Maria Syme (December 7, 1972 – April 2, 2001) was an American actress, personal assistant, and record company executive. She appeared in the films Lost Highway (1997) and Ellie Parker (2005). The film Mulholland Drive (2001) was dedicated to her.

Syme was in a relationship with actor Keanu Reeves from 1998 until early 2000. Following the stillbirth of their daughter in December 1999, Syme struggled with depression. Syme died in an automobile collision at the age of 28 on April 2, 2001, shortly after she and Reeves had reunited.

== Early life and career ==
Syme was born in Pico Rivera, California, and was raised in Laguna Beach. Her parents were Maria St. John and Charles Syme, a retired California highway patrol officer; they divorced some time after Syme was born.

When Syme was about to start high school, she and her mother moved to Los Angeles, where Syme developed a passion for moviemaking and especially for David Lynch's films. Actor and filmmaker Scott Coffey said that Syme was 16 years old when she walked into Lynch's office. "She was a huge fan and wanted to do anything on Twin Peaks", Coffey said. Syme landed a job at Lynch's company, Asymmetrical Productions, where she started as an intern and ended up working for five years. She introduced Lynch to many of the musicians he used in his projects, and according to Coffey, she had a huge influence on the music in the film Lost Highway (1997). Marilyn Manson mentioned Syme and how she helped him work with Lynch in his 1998 memoir The Long Hard Road Out of Hell.

Syme also did some acting, and Scott Coffey directed her in five independent short films. The last one, Ellie Parker, was shown at the Sundance Film Festival in January 2001. Syme later joined the staff of a music label. She was also a personal assistant to guitarist Dave Navarro of Jane's Addiction and, later, the Red Hot Chili Peppers.

In 1997, Syme made her film debut in a small role credited as "junkie girl" in David Lynch's Lost Highway.

Syme had a small role credited as "casting chick" in Scott Coffey's film Ellie Parker, released in 2005, reprising the role she played in the 2001 short film of the same title.

At the time of her death in 2001, Syme had enrolled in a film-supervision course at UCLA, and was working as a record company executive.

== Personal life ==
According to reports, Syme met actor Keanu Reeves in 1998 at a party thrown for Reeves's rock band, Dogstar, and they started dating. However, Syme's mother, Maria St. John, disputed the reports and said the two had known each other for a decade, and that she was with Syme when she met Reeves, and it was not at a party.

On December 24, 1999, while eight months pregnant, she gave birth to her child with Reeves, a daughter, but the baby was stillborn. Syme's and Reeves's grief over the loss put a strain on their relationship, which ended several weeks later. They remained close friends after their breakup and were back together in 2001.

St. John said that Syme became very depressed when her grandfather, Alfonso Diaz, died in March 2001. Her mother noted that it was the first time she had been back to the hospital since her baby died.

== Death ==
On the night of April 1, 2001, Syme attended a party at the home of musician Marilyn Manson. After being driven home by another party guest shortly before dawn the following morning, she left her home, reportedly to return to the party. She drove her Jeep Grand Cherokee into a row of parked cars on Cahuenga Boulevard in Los Angeles. She was partially ejected from the vehicle and died instantly. She was 28 years old. Reeves, Dave Navarro, Scott Coffey, Anthrax's guitarist Scott Ian, and David Lynch acted as pallbearers at Syme's funeral. Syme was eulogized to the sound of Barbra Streisand's "Higher Ground" and Bette Midler's "Wind Beneath My Wings" as Lynch screened a series of snapshots from Syme's life at the Good Shepherd Church in Beverly Hills. She was buried next to her daughter at the Westwood Village Memorial Park Cemetery in Los Angeles.

While Syme and Reeves had broken up shortly after the stillbirth of their daughter, Reeves told investigators that they were back together. On April 1, 2001, they had brunch together at Crepes on Cole in San Francisco. The next day, after Syme's mother told him about the accident, Reeves called the Los Angeles County Coroner's Office and asked, according to Lt. Mac Willie, "if Jen Syme was there." Reeves offered to identify the body, but he was told that she had already been identified.

An investigation into the collision found that Syme was not wearing a seatbelt. Police found two rolled-up dollar bills that contained a white, powdery substance, and two bottles of prescription drugs: a muscle relaxant and an anticonvulsant. Syme's mother told police her daughter had recently sought treatment for back pain from an earlier automobile collision a few days before her death, and for depression stemming from her daughter's stillbirth. Cocaine was later found in Syme's blood. (Note: Stated on page 2 of the "Maria St. John vs Brian Warner (aka Marilyn Manson)" lawsuit.)

=== Aftermath ===
Lynch dedicated his 2001 film Mulholland Drive to Syme in the closing credits.

In April 2002, Syme's mother, Maria St. John, sued Marilyn Manson for wrongful death, for giving Syme "various quantities of an illegal controlled substance" and for "instructing [Syme] to operate a motor vehicle in her incapacitated condition". Manson denied responsibility, stating that the lawsuit was "completely without merit". The case was dismissed at St. John's request in May 2003.

Manson depicted Syme in a painting titled "A Daughter without a Mother and a Mother without a Daughter (in Memory of Jen)".

== Filmography ==
=== Actress ===
- Lost Highway (1997) – Junkie Girl
- Ellie Parker (2001) – Casting Chick (short film)
- Ellie Parker (2005) – Casting Chick (posthumous credit, final film role)

=== Production assistant ===
- Hotel Room (1 episode, 1993)
- Lost Highway (1997)
