= Jordan Ladd =

American actress (born 1975)

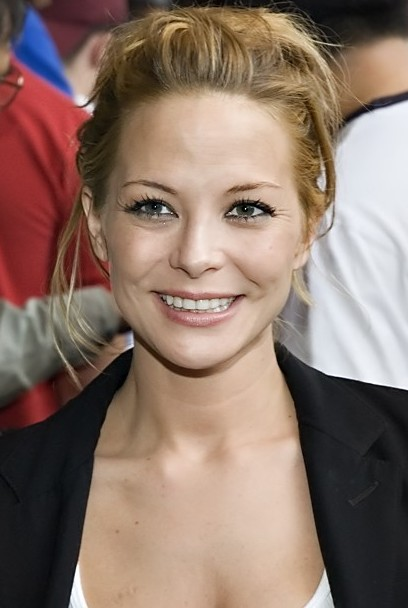
- Ladd at the Grindhouse premiere in 2007
- Born: January 14, 1975 (age 51); Los Angeles, California, U.S.
- Occupation: Actress
- Years active: 1990–present
- Spouse: Conor O'Neill (m. 2001; div. 2005)
- Parents: David Ladd (father); Cheryl Ladd (mother)
- Relatives: Alan Ladd (paternal grandfather); Sue Carol (paternal grandmother); Alan Ladd Jr. (paternal uncle)

Jordan Elizabeth Ladd (born January 14, 1975) is an American actress. The daughter of actress Cheryl Ladd and producer David Ladd, she initially worked with her mother in several made-for-television films, before appearing at nineteen in the direct-to-video erotic film Embrace of the Vampire (1994). She subsequently appeared in the drama Nowhere (1997) and the comedy Never Been Kissed (1999). Ladd became known as a scream queen, having appeared in several successful horror films, including Cabin Fever (2002), Club Dread (2004), Death Proof (2007), and Grace (2009). Ladd is also known for work with director David Lynch appearing in his films Darkened Room (2002) and Inland Empire (2006).

== Early life ==
Jordan Ladd was born on January 14, 1975, in Los Angeles, California, the daughter of actress Cheryl Ladd (née Stoppelmoor), and producer and former actor David Ladd. Her paternal grandfather was Alan Ladd, an actor and film producer of English descent, and her paternal grandmother was Sue Carol (née Evelyn Lederer), a Hollywood talent agent and actress of Jewish descent. Ladd's maternal ancestry is German. Ladd's parents divorced in 1980. She has a stepsister, Lindsay Russell.

She graduated from high school in 1993, managing to lead a normal life despite her family's fame; she once remarked: "When I was in high school I used to go to the clubs, and of course that's exciting [...] You want to drink before you can and get into places you can't. But once I started acting professionally, I really didn't want to do the Hollywood nightlife thing." She enrolled at Southern Methodist University in Dallas, Texas in 1992, but dropped out after a year of studies.

== Career ==
=== 1990s ===
At the age of two, Ladd began appearing in commercials. Her first commercial was for Polaroid. She began acting in film and television while in school, working with her mother in made-for-television films such as The Girl Who Came Between Them (1990) and Broken Promises: Taking Emily Back (1993). After graduating from high school, she took up acting professionally.

In 1994, she guest-starred in an episode of the NBC series Saved by the Bell: The New Class and made her big screen debut with a supporting appearance as a promiscuous college student opposite Alyssa Milano in the film Embrace of the Vampire. She spent the majority of the 1990s appearing in a variety of independent films, including Inside Out, Nowhere, and Stand-ins. In 1999, she appeared in Taking the Plunge, and also landed her first high-profile role alongside Drew Barrymore as a popular student who tortures an insecure copy editor in the teen comedy Never Been Kissed. The film was a commercial success, grossing US$84.5 million globally, and gave her an initial wide exposure with audiences.

=== 2000s ===
Ladd appeared in The Specials (2000), a comedy about a group of superheroes on their day off; in the film she played a neurotic named Nightbird. By 2000, she also had starred as an actress who vying for an Academy Award in E! first original film Best Actress, and appeared in the critically acclaimed anthology film Boys Life 3.

Ladd starred as a college graduate and the victim to a flesh-eating virus in the horror film Cabin Fever (2002), Eli Roth's directorial debut. Ladd described working on the film as "insane," as it began shooting just a month after 9/11. She remarked: "We shut down, we got up and running, and then we shut down again. We just hoped to finish the movie and hoped people would really understand and appreciate it. We had a blast doing it, even the tougher stuff. I'd rather work that way than on a big-budget fancy thing where you are completely separate from the process." It was with this film that she began work in the horror genre, as she had a "real education on that way of storytelling" with Roth and the film. Cabin Fever was largely praised by critics, and made US$30.5 million on a budget of US$1.5 million. That same year, she played a crying woman in David Lynch's Japanese-style horror short Darkened Room.

In 2004, Ladd took on the role of a suspect in a recent string of murders on a vacationing island in the horror comedy Club Dread, and starred as a mental health facility nurse in the horror Madhouse. Her topless scene in Club Dread ranked 14th in Complex magazine's "15 Best Topless Moments In Mainstream Horror Movies". In 2005, she appeared opposite Anna Faris, Ryan Reynolds and Justin Long in the independent romantic comedy Waiting..., and in 2006, she briefly appeared in David Lynch's film Inland Empire.

Quentin Tarantino cast her as a wild, partying Texan and the victim of a killer stuntman in Death Proof, his high-speed segment of the double–feature exploitation horror Grindhouse (2007), alongside Rosario Dawson, Tracie Thoms, Zoë Bell, and Kurt Russell. The film flopped at the box office, but attracted significant media buzz and critical acclaim. Director Eli Roth, in his contribution to Grindhouse, worked again with Ladd in a fake promo called Thanksgiving, which she shot "on the fly over" in Prague, where Hostel: Part II was being filmed; in the horror sequel, she played the girlfriend of the sole survivor of the first film.

In her next film, the horror Grace (2009), Ladd portrayed a woman, who after a car accident, decides to carry her unborn baby to term anyway. The film was screened on the film festival circuit in North America, to critical acclaim. John Anderson of Variety felt that Ladd played her role with "tongue planted firmly in cheek", in what he described as "a satirical creepfest that mines modern motherhood for all its latent terrors". In 2009, she also starred in the made-for-television film The Wishing Well, as a journalist from New York City who gets sent to a small town in Illinois to report on a legendary wishing well.

=== 2010s ===
Ladd filmed a comedic short film entitled First Dates, exploring the dating scene of several single people. The production premiered at the AFI screening room in Los Angeles on January 8, 2011. She starred in the fantasy romance film Awaken (2012), which premiered at the Newport Beach Film Festival, as a mysterious woman who changes the mundane life of a man. In 2012, she also appeared in the direct-to-DVD disaster film Air Collision, as a flight attendant, and in the thriller Murder on the 13th Floor, as a wife who discovers her husband is having an affair with the live-in nanny and decides to seek revenge.

In 2015, Ladd guest-starred in an episode of the YouTube horror anthology series Scary Endings, directed by John Fitzpatrick. In 2016, she reunited with Fitzpatrick for the short thriller film Brentwood Strangler, in which she played a lonely woman goes on a blind date with a man who, unbeknownst to her, was replaced by an active and notorious serial killer, opposite Adam J. Yeend and Annika Marks. She was cast in her role, following an introduction from Skypemare actress Cerina Vincent, who Ladd worked with on Cabin Fever. The 19-minute production premiered on film festival circuits in North America and Australia, to a positive critical response. Gruesome Magazine found Ladd to be a "delight" as an "emotionally strong woman who lets her guard down and exposes her vulnerability".

In 2017, Ladd starred in the made-for-television thriller Stage Fright, as an opera soprano facing a series of dangers, and in the independent drama Blue Line, as a woman who, along with her best friend, go on a crime spree to rob her abusive husband and escape her marriage.

== Personal life ==
Ladd married her longtime boyfriend, documentary film editor Conor O'Neill, in 2001. The couple divorced in July 2005.

== Filmography ==
=== Film ===
Year	Title	Role	Notes
1994	Embrace of the Vampire	Eliza	
1997	Inside Out	Summer	
1997	Nowhere	Alyssa	
1997	Stand-ins	Monica	
1999	Taking the Plunge		
1999	Never Been Kissed	Gibby Zerefski	
2000	The Specials	Shelly / Nightbird	
2000	Boys Life 3	Summer	Short film
2001	Puzzled	Skye	
2002	Crazy Little Thing	Dana	Also known as The Perfect You
2002	Darkened Room	Girl 1	Short film
2002	Cabin Fever	Karen	
2004	Club Dread	Penelope	Also known as Broken Lizard's Club Dread
2004	Junked	Nikki	
2004	Madhouse	Sara	
2004	Dog Gone Love	Arianna	
2005	Waiting...	Danielle	
2006	Inland Empire	Terri	
2007	Hostel: Part II	Stephanie	
2007	Death Proof	Shanna "Banana"	Part of the Grindhouse double feature
2009	Grace	Madeline Matheson	
2011	First Dates	Joanna	Short film
2012	Awaken	Rachel Arai	
2012	Murder on the 13th Floor	Ariana Braxton	
2012	Air Collision	Lindsay Bates	
2016	Brentwood Strangler	Maggie	Short film
2017	The Assault	Lindsay Walters	
2017	The Untold Story	Rebecca	
2019	Satanic Panic	Kim Larson	

=== Television ===
Year	Title	Role	Notes
1978	Charlie's Angels	young Kris Munroe	Episode: "Angel on my Mind"
1990	The Girl Who Came Between Them	The Waitress	Movie
1993	Broken Promises: Taking Emily Back	The Waitress	Movie
1994	Love Street	Bordello Player	Episode: "Bordello"
1994	Saved by the Bell: The New Class	Debbie	Episode: "The Return of Screech"
1997	Weapons of Mass Distraction	Letitia	Movie
1997	Total Security	Fiona Richards	Episode: "One Wedding and a Funeral"
1998	Every Mother's Worst Fear	Martha Hoagland	Movie
2000	Best Actress	Amber Lyons	Movie
2000	The Deadly Look of Love	Janet Flanders	Movie
2001	Six Feet Under	Ginnie	Episode: "An Open Book"
2005–2007	Robot Chicken	Various Characters	5 episodes
2007	It Was One Of Us	Avis Monroe	Movie
2009	The Wishing Well	Cynthia Tamerline	Movie
2015	Scary Endings	Grace	Episode: "Voyeur"
2017	Stage Fright	Sarah Conrad	Movie
2018	The Christmas Contract	Breonna Guidry	TV film
