= Aurora Perrineau =

American actress

- Born: New York City, U.S.
- Occupation: Actress
- Years active: 2011–present
- Partner: Michael Vlamis (2020–2024)
- Father: Harold Perrineau

Aurora Perrineau is an American actress and model. She is best known for starring as Shana Elmsford in Jem and the Holograms (2015), the live-action film adaptation of the 1980s animated television series Jem, Giselle Hammond in Blumhouse's Truth or Dare (2018), Tanya in Netflix's When They See Us (2019), and as C in HBO's Westworld (2022).

== Life and career ==
Perrineau was born to actor Harold Perrineau and Brittany Robinson Perrineau, a former actress and model for Tommy Hilfiger and Liz Claiborne throughout the 1990s. At age 16, she signed as a model with Click Model Management, Inc.

In November 2017, Perrineau filed a police report with the Los Angeles County Sheriff's Department accusing scriptwriter Murray Miller of sexual assault in 2012 when the actress was 17. Girls creator-writer-actress Lena Dunham initially defended Miller, who was a writer for the series, but later retracted her statements. On August 10, 2018, the Los Angeles County District Attorney's Office declined to file charges against Miller.

In 2012, Perrineau starred in the direct-to-video film Air Collision. In 2014, Perrineau appeared in episodes of Newsreaders and in Chasing Life as Margo. In April 2014, it was announced that Perrineau was cast in the role of Shana in Jem and the Holograms, based on the animated series Jem (1985–1988). The film came under fire from children who had since grown into decades-older fans of the original cartoon, upset that the decades-older voice cast was not hired to play the teenaged characters, with racially motivated complaints personally directed against Perrineau for not being black enough.

In July 2014, Perrineau was cast in Drake Doremus's film Equals. The film had its world premiere at the Toronto International Film Festival on September 5, 2015. Perrineau had a small role in the film Passengers, released on December 21, 2016. In 2018, Perrineau was cast as Giselle Hammond in the Blumhouse supernatural thriller film Truth or Dare.

In July 2025, it was announced that Perrineau will play the role of Chantal in Every Year After, a series in pre-production that was first announced in 2024.

From 2020 to 2024, Perrineau was in a relationship with fellow actor Michael Vlamis.

== Filmography ==
Key
†	Denotes films that have not yet been released

=== Film ===
Year	Title	Role	Notes
2012	Air Collision	Radhika Darshan	Direct-to-video
2015	A House Is Not a Home	Ashley Williams	
2015	Equals	Iris	
2015	Jem and the Holograms	Shana Elmsford	
2015	Freaks of Nature	Vampiress	
2016	Passengers	Celeste	
2018	Truth or Dare	Giselle Hammond	
2018	Boo!	Morgan	
2018	Virginia Minnesota	Addison	
2021	It Takes Three	Roxy	
2025	Abraham's Boys	Elsie	
TBA	Crossword †	Tessa	Post-production; also executive producer

=== Television ===
Year	Title	Role	Notes
2011	Pretty Little Liars	Bianca	Episode: "Picture This"
2014	Newsreaders	Hilary	Episode: "F- Dancing, Are You Decent?"
2015	Chasing Life	Margo	4 episodes
2017	The Carmichael Show	Casey North	Episode: "Maxine's Sister"
2018, 2019	Into the Dark	Dorothy, Ashley Prime	2 episodes
2019	When They See Us	Tanya	Miniseries; 4 episodes
2019–2021	Prodigal Son	Dani Powell	Main role
2022	Westworld	C / Frankie Nichols	Recurring role (season 4)
2024	Kaos	Riddy	Main role
2026–present	Every Year After	Chantal	Main role

=== Music videos ===
Year	Title	Artist	Notes
2016	"Kids"	OneRepublic	Main role
