= The Wishing Well (film) =

- Genre: Fantasy/Romantic Drama
- Written by: Steven H. Berman
- Directed by: David Jackson
- Starring: Jordan Ladd; Jason London; Jadin Gould; Ernest Borgnine; Sally Kellerman; Yeardley Smith; Charles Shaughnessy; Tempestt Bledsoe
- Music by: Stephen Graziano
- Country of origin: United States
- Original language: English

Production
- Executive producers: Larry Levinson; Randy Pope; Michael Moran
- Producer: Brian J. Gordon
- Cinematography: Brian Shanley
- Editor: Christine Kelley
- Running time: 120 minutes
- Production company: LG Films in association with Larry Levinson Productions

Original release
- Network: Hallmark Channel
- Release: 2009

The Wishing Well is a fantasy romantic drama film made for the Hallmark Channel, which premiered in the UK in 2009 and had its USA premiere in 2010. It was directed by David Jackson and starred Jordan Ladd and Jason London.

== Plot summary ==
Cynthia (Ladd), a shallow journalist, is sent to a small town to investigate its reportedly magic wishing well. She makes a wish, wishing to just be happy, and when she wakes up the next morning, finds she has entered a parallel universe in which she is working for the town's local newspaper run by local, Mark (London). Here, she is not the flashy journalist she was and begins to love the simple life the town has to offer

== Cast ==
- Jordan Ladd as Cynthia Tamerline
- Jason London as Mark
- Ernest Borgnine as Big Jim
- Sally Kellerman as Donette
- Michael Rose as Bob
- Jadin Gould as Abby Jansen
- Tessie Santiago as Rachel
- Yeardley Smith as Mary Williams
- Anne De Salvo as Zeil
- Charles Shaughnessy as Bosley
- Tempestt Bledsoe as Enid
- Kyle T. Heffner as Keenie James
- Senta Moses as Michelle
- Heather Tocquigny as Erin
- Kevin Kirkpatrick as Tyson
- Rod McCary as Upshaw
