= Air Collision =

American disaster film

- Film poster
- Directed by: Liz Adams
- Written by: Liz Adams
- Produced by: David Michael Latt
- Starring: Reginald VelJohnson; Jordan Ladd; Gerald Webb
- Cinematography: Stuart Brereton
- Edited by: Rob Pallatina
- Music by: Chris Ridenhour
- Production company: The Asylum
- Distributed by: The Asylum
- Release date: March 27, 2012 (United States)
- Running time: 92 minutes
- Country: United States
- Language: English
- Budget: £4 million
- Box office: £2.56

Air Collision is a 2012 American direct-to-video action film directed by Liz Adams and starring Reginald VelJohnson, Jordan Ladd and Gerald Webb. Air Collision was released on March 27, 2012 by The Asylum.

== Plot ==
After a major electromagnetic storm cripples communications worldwide, a new satellite-based Airborne collision avoidance system (ACAT) air traffic control system is struck, with debris hitting the earth. The malfunctioning satellite puts all air traffic in danger on the U.S. east coast where it is being operated on a "pilot project".

Consequently, two aircraft are heading on a collision course. One is a commercial airliner carrying hundreds of passengers while the other is Air Force One, carrying President Phillips (Andy Clemence), the President of the United States, and his family. The ACAT begins sending out errant commands that put both aircraft into serious jeopardy.

In the severe electric storm, satellites begin failing with debris hitting major populated areas in the United States. Dr. Antonia "Toni" Pierce (Erin Coker) comes upon some of the debris and contacts Cleveland FAA Air Traffic controller Bob Abbot (Reginald VelJohnson). Abbot tries to prevent the looming disaster, overriding all top level directives to keep aircraft flying, he wants to ground all traffic.

Both the commercial airliner and Air Force One are struck by repeated lightning strikes that partially disable the aircraft. The damaged satellite signals cause the ACAT to wreak havoc on the escorting F-16 fighters. The McDonnell Douglas MD-80 airliner also loses both engines but gets a restart just before impacting. A rogue Sidewinder missile from Air Force One also strikes the converging airliner and both aircraft impact in a glancing hit. The airliner crash-lands in Cleveland.

An Air Force Lockheed C-130 Hercules rescue effort ultimately fails to bring Air Force One's passengers to safety, and electrical impulses affecting the president's aircraft kill the flight crew, leaving the only alternative being the President's daughter (Stephanie Hullar) attempting to disable the ACAT system. When the ACAT is finally overridden, the President takes control of Air Force One and brings it into a landing at Detroit.

== Cast ==
- Reginald VelJohnson as Bob Abbot
- Jordan Ladd as Lindsay Bates
- Erin Coker as Dr. Antonia "Toni" Pierce
- Gerald Webb as First Officer Ken Aoki
- Michael Teh as Captain Roscoe Simms
- Darin Cooper as Colonel Chuck Lawler
- Darren Anthony Thomas as Major Eric Lewis
- Andy Clemence as President Phillips
- Meredith Thomas as First Lady Kimberly Phillips
- Stephanie Hullar as Milani Phillips
- Caryn Ward as Presidential Purser Joan Watts (credited as Caryn Ward Ross)
- Aurora Perrineau as Radhika Darshan
- Dave Vescio as Eli Reyher
- Korey Simeone as Cody Marler
- Jonathan Nation as Brent Powel
- Jewel Greenberg as Carlene Wheeler
- Edward L. Green as Klaus Ingram

== Production ==
Principal photography took place at Santa Clarita, California. Footage of Air Force One was featured. In reality VC-25As are Boeing 747-200Bs, not the 747-400 shown in the movie.

== Reception ==
While not reviewed by critics in mainstream media, Air Collision did have a brief theatrical run and did garner some interest from internet bloggers and other film critics. Michael Allen in 28dayslateranalysis.com said, "'Air Collision' is not really a mockbuster, as director Liz Adams experiments with the disaster genre. The film is pure fantasy. The President of the United States' life is in danger, satellites fall from the sky and special agents fly through the air. This is ridiculous! But, maybe that is the magic that drives The Asylum production machine. 'Air Collision' requires that viewers have fertile imaginations as well. There are just too many strange going-ons to see this film as believable on any level. And, perhaps, therein lies the charm of The Asylum's latest."

In a similar vein, Christopher Armstead in Film Critics United said, "I was initially going to advise you that an unhealthy dose of suspended belief will be required to get the most of ‘Air Collision’, but upon further examination... don't bother. You see almost from beginning to end, almost nothing that happens in this movie has any real relation to anything that could possibly happen on the actual Planet Earth. ... But what is it that makes ‘Air Collision’ arguably the greatest Asylum movie ever? Because it goes. And it goes. And just when you think it's about to slow down, it goes some more. Because while the movie itself is completely ludicrous, the stellar cast of hundreds took this movie deadly serious which created a perfect storm of serious insanity."
