= 2006 National Society of Film Critics Awards =

Annual US film awards ceremony

41st NSFC Awards

January 6, 2007

Best Film:
Pan's Labyrinth

The 41st National Society of Film Critics Awards, given on 6 January 2007, honored the best in film for 2006.

== Winners ==
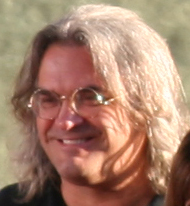
Paul Greengrass, Best Director winner

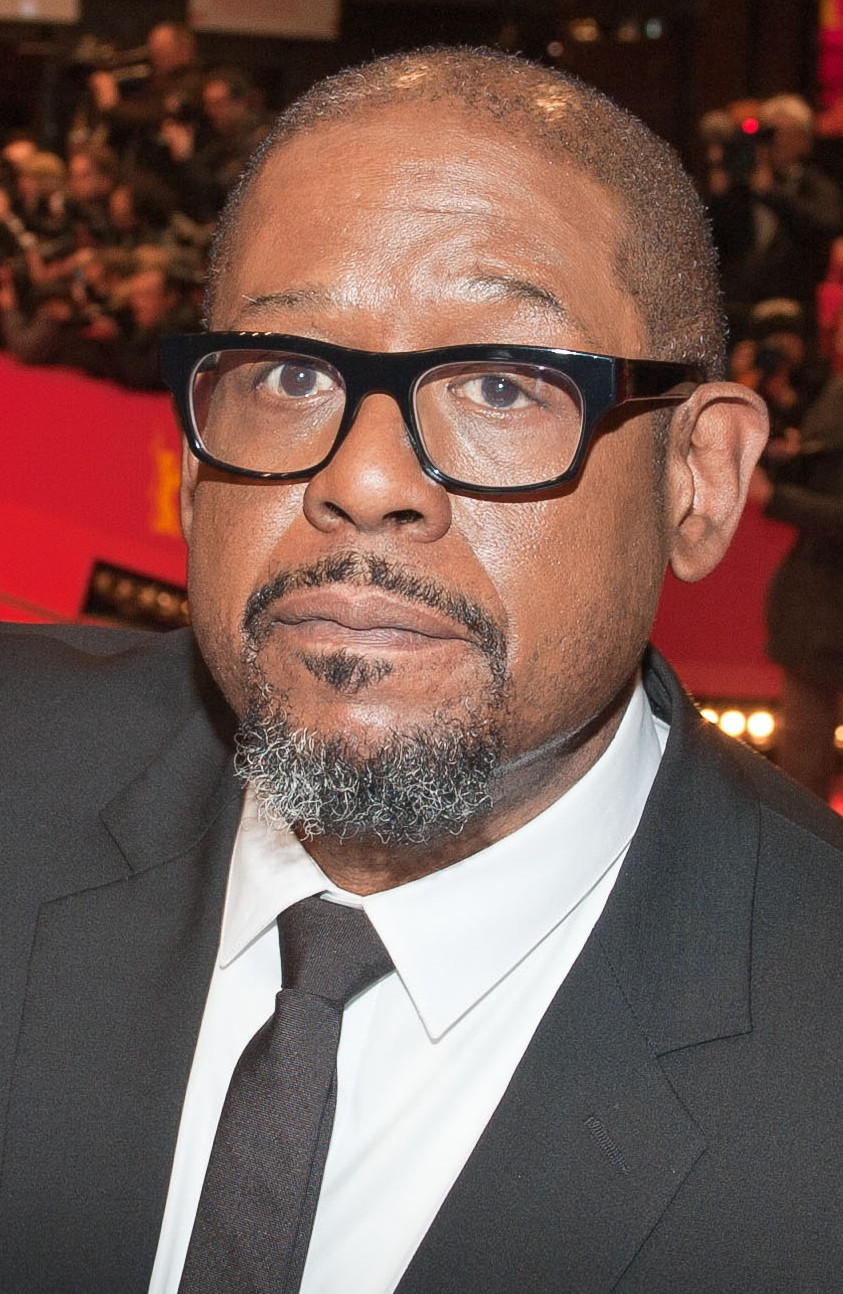
Forest Whitaker, Best Actor winner

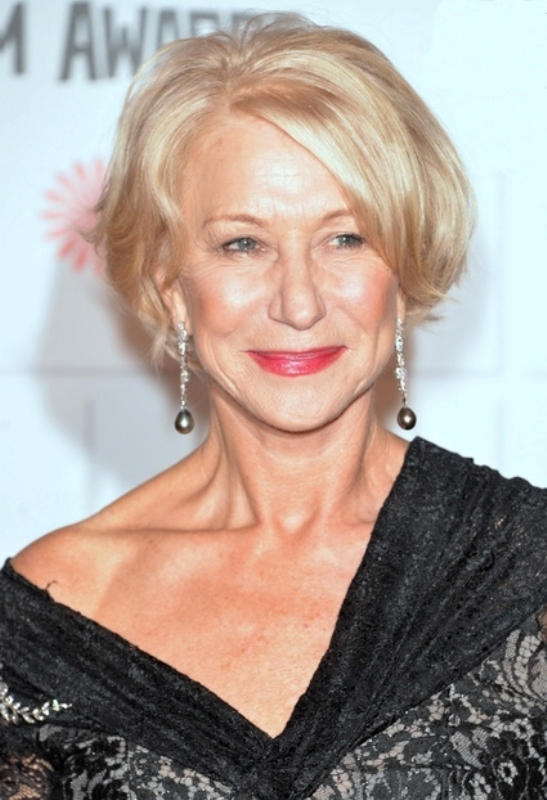
Helen Mirren, Best Actress winner

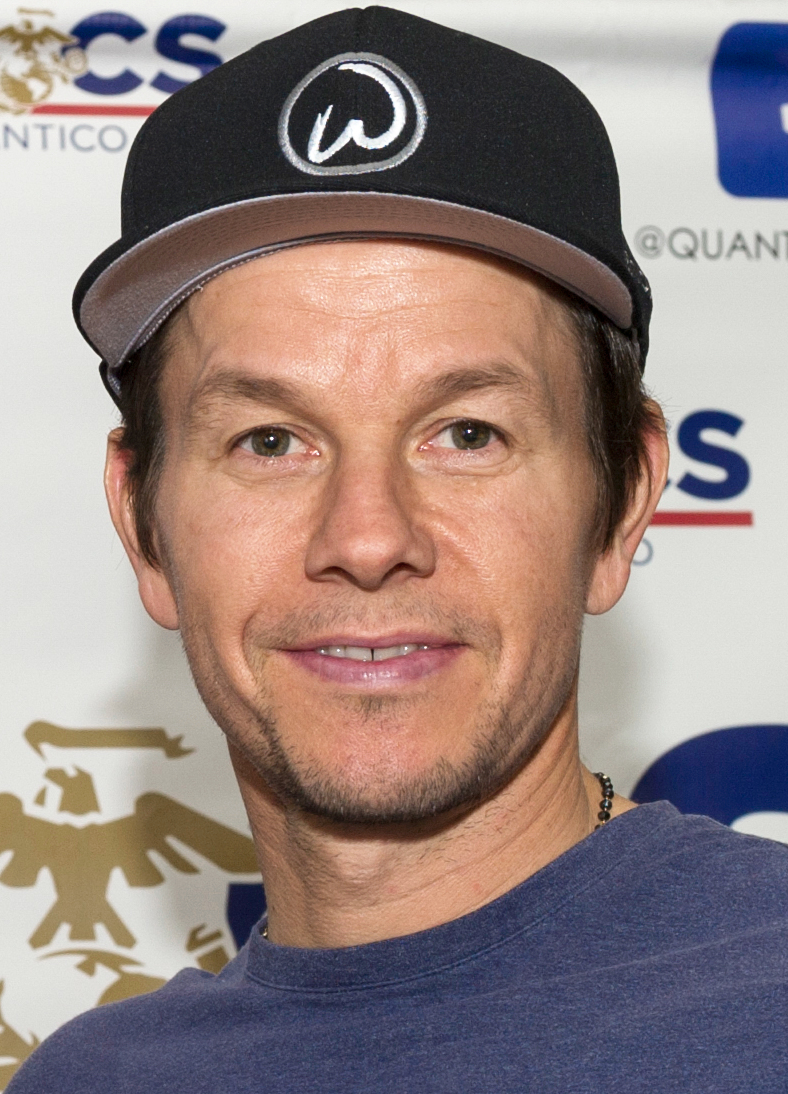
Mark Wahlberg, Best Supporting Actor winner

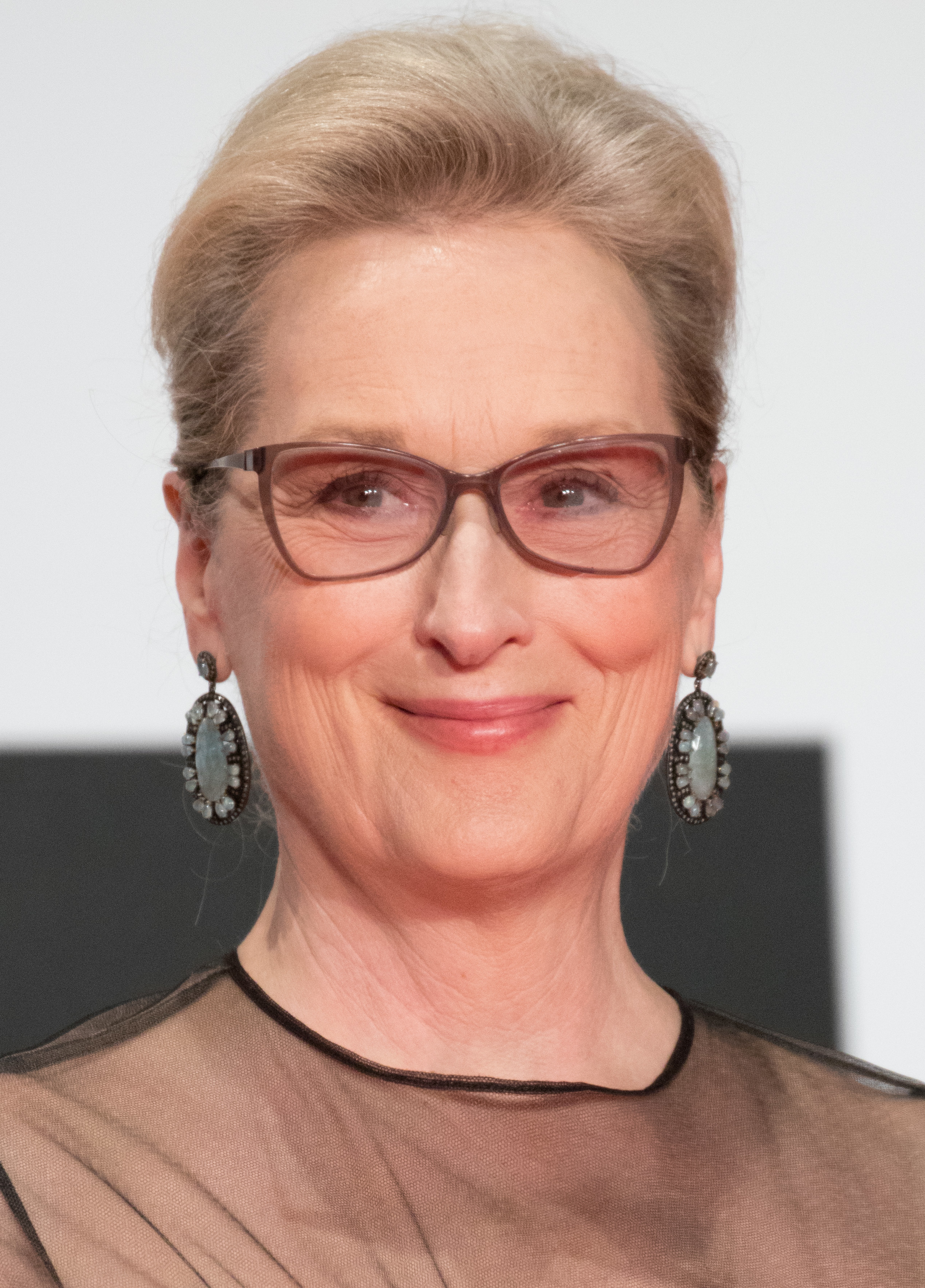
Meryl Streep, Best Supporting Actress winner

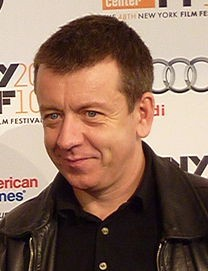
Peter Morgan, Best Screenplay winner

=== Best Picture ===
1. Pan's Labyrinth (El laberinto del fauno)
2. The Death of Mr. Lazarescu (Moartea domnului Lăzărescu)
3. Letters from Iwo Jima

=== Best Director ===
1. Paul Greengrass – United 93
2. Guillermo del Toro – Pan's Labyrinth (El laberinto del fauno)
2. Martin Scorsese – The Departed

=== Best Actor ===
1. Forest Whitaker – The Last King of Scotland
2. Peter O'Toole – Venus
3. Ryan Gosling – Half Nelson

=== Best Actress ===
1. Helen Mirren – The Queen
2. Laura Dern – Inland Empire
3. Judi Dench – Notes on a Scandal

=== Best Supporting Actor ===
1. Mark Wahlberg – The Departed
2. Jackie Earle Haley – Little Children
3. Alan Arkin – Little Miss Sunshine

=== Best Supporting Actress ===
1. Meryl Streep – The Devil Wears Prada and A Prairie Home Companion
2. Jennifer Hudson – Dreamgirls
3. Shareeka Epps – Half Nelson

=== Best Screenplay ===
1. Peter Morgan – The Queen
2. William Monahan – The Departed
3. Eric Roth – The Good Shepherd

=== Best Cinematography ===
1. Emmanuel Lubezki – Children of Men
2. Guillermo Navarro – Pan's Labyrinth (El laberinto del fauno)
3. Zhao Xiaoding – Curse of the Golden Flower (Mǎnchéngjìndàihuángjīnjiǎ)

=== Best Non-Fiction Film ===
1. An Inconvenient Truth
2. Deliver Us from Evil
3. Dixie Chicks: Shut Up and Sing

=== Best Experimental Film ===
- Inland Empire

=== Film Heritage Awards ===
1. Jean-Pierre Melville's Army of Shadows (1969), released by Rialto Pictures for the first time in the United States.
2. Museum of the Moving Image for presenting the first complete U.S. retrospective of French filmmaker Jacques Rivette, including the premiere American showing of the director's legendary Out 1.
