= Clay's Way =

2004 novel by Blair Mastbaum

- Front cover
- Author: Blair Mastbaum
- Language: English
- Genre: Coming-of-age; Gay romance
- Set in: Honolulu
- Publisher: Alyson Books
- Publication date: 2004
- Publication place: United States
- Media type: Print
- Pages: 246
- Awards: Lambda Literary Award

Clay's Way is the debut novel of American writer Blair Mastbaum. Released in 2004 by Alyson Books, this contemporary novel, which won the Lambda Literary Award for LGBT Debut Fiction, follows 15-year-old gay skateboarder Sam and the object of his affection, conflicted surfer Clay around Honolulu.

== Reception ==
Poet and novelist Trebor Healey called Clay's Way "a brilliantly raw and insightful coming-of-age story for a new queer generation" and concluded as "a coming of age novel, it hits pay dirt because, instead of a happy ending, it ends on a note of expansion: Something has happened to Sam that, after the smoke has cleared, causes him to look up at the sky and realize he's no longer Sam the kid, but Sam the man." The Gay & Lesbian Review found it an "impressive comic debut novel" and that "Mastbaum’s quirky narrator and comic verve propel the reader through this story of painful yet instructive young love made art for readers of all ages."
