= It Takes Three =

- Promotional poster
- Directed by: Scott Coffey
- Starring: Jared Gilman; Aurora Perrineau; Mikey Madison; David Gridley
- Release date: September 3, 2021
- Running time: 90 minutes
- Country: United States
- Languages: English; Spanish

It Takes Three is a 2021 American romantic comedy film directed by Scott Coffey and starring Jared Gilman, Aurora Perrineau, Mikey Madison and David Gridley.

== Cast ==
- Jared Gilman as Cy Berger
- Aurora Perrineau as Roxy
- Mikey Madison as Kat
- David Gridley as Chris Newton

== Release ==
The film was released on VOD and digital platforms on September 3, 2021.

== Reception ==
The film has a 67% rating on Rotten Tomatoes based on nine reviews. Brian Costello of Common Sense Media awarded the film four stars out of five.

Becca James of the Chicago Reader gave the film a positive review, writing, "the film is charming enough to hold viewers' attention thanks in large part to Jared Gilman and Mikey Madison."
