= Blair Mastbaum =

American writer and a former model (born 1979)

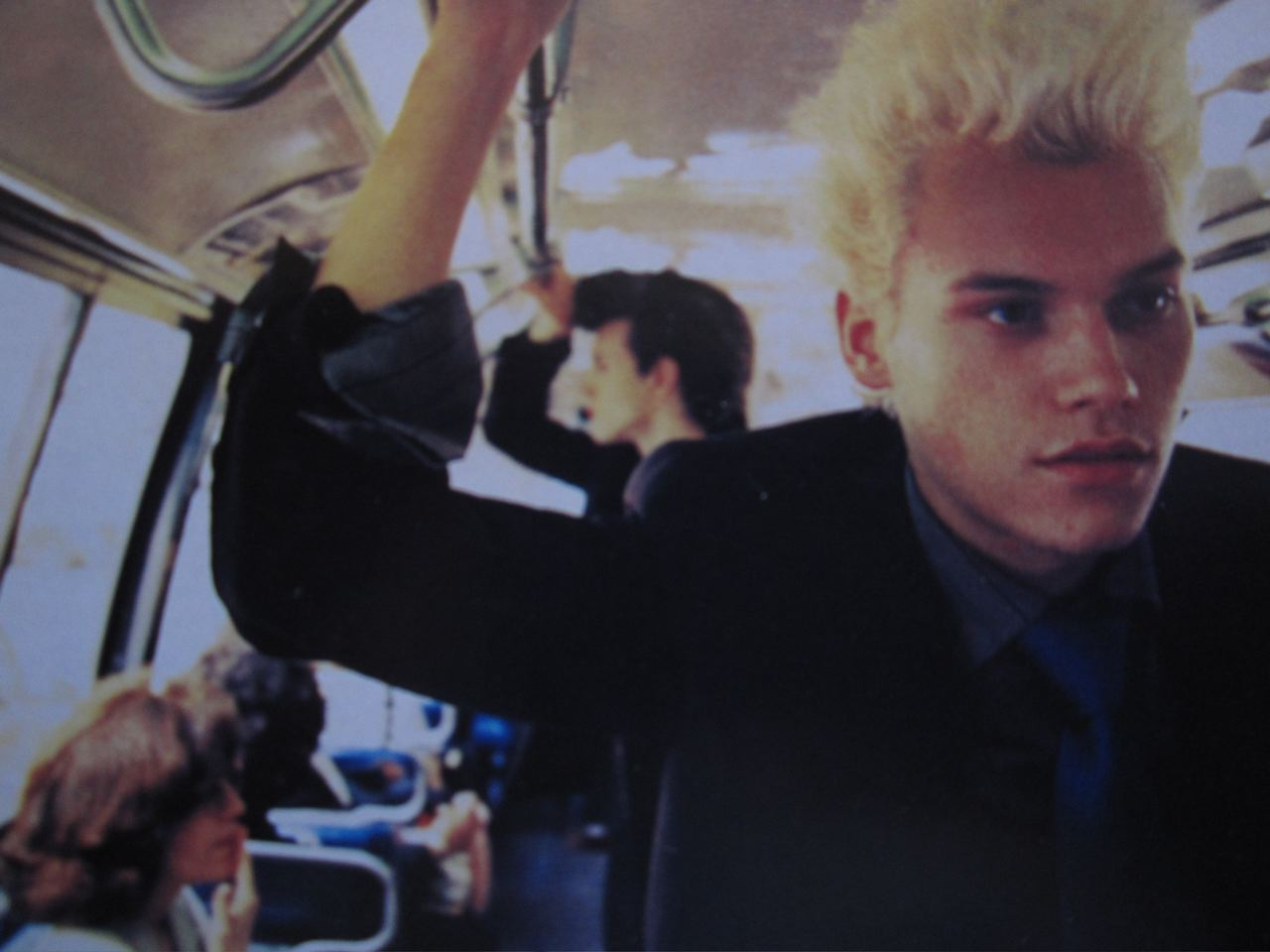
- Blair Mastbaum
- Born: January 24, 1979 (age 47); Dayton, Ohio, U.S.
- Occupations: Novelist; screenwriter; short-story writer
- Writing career
- Period: 2003–present
- Notable works: Clay's Way (2004); Us Ones In Between (2008)

Blair Mastbaum (born January 24, 1979) is an American writer and former model. Mastbaum fabricated a series of stories published by Atlas Obscura. The articles were retracted after investigations found plagiarism, fabricated quotes and interviews, and misinformation.

== Career ==
Mastbaum acted in and produced the 2005 Sundance Film Festival official competition film, Ellie Parker, directed by his partner, Scott Coffey. He co-wrote the 2018 feature film, For Real, also directed by Coffey.

=== Clay's Way ===
Mastbaum's first novel, 2004's Clay's Way, won a Lambda Literary Award.

=== Us Ones in Between ===
Mastbaum's second novel, Us Ones in Between, published by Running Press and released in May 2008, centers on depressed art school graduate Kurt Smith, who fantasizes about pushing boys in front of subway trains. The title is taken from the song "Us Ones in Between," written by Spencer Krug and performed by the band Sunset Rubdown. The novel was a finalist for the 2008 Ferro-Grumley Award.

=== Other works ===
Mastbaum edited the anthology Cool Thing: The Best New Gay Fiction by Young American Writers, released by Running Press on November 10, 2008.

== Bibliography ==
=== Novels ===
- Clay's Way (2004)
- Us Ones in Between (2008)

=== Edited works ===
- Cool Thing: The Best New Gay Fiction by Young American Writers (2008)
