= Ellie Parker =

2005 film by Scott Coffey

- Theatrical release poster
- Directed by: Scott Coffey
- Written by: Scott Coffey
- Produced by: Scott Coffey; Naomi Watts
- Starring: Naomi Watts; Rebecca Rigg; Scott Coffey; Mark Pellegrino; Chevy Chase
- Cinematography: Scott Coffey; Blair Mastbaum
- Edited by: Matt Chesse
- Music by: Neil Jackson; BC Smith
- Production companies: Strand Releasing; Kailua Productions
- Distributed by: Dream Entertainment; Strand Releasing
- Release dates: November 11, 2005 (United States; limited)
- Running time: 95 minutes
- Country: United States
- Language: English
- Budget: $4 million
- Box office: $45,726

Ellie Parker is a 2005 American comedy-drama film written and directed by Scott Coffey. It stars Naomi Watts in the title role, a young woman struggling as an actress in Los Angeles. Ellie Parker began as a short film that was screened at the 2001 Sundance Film Festival. Using a handheld digital camera, writer-director Scott Coffey expanded it into a feature-length film at various times over the next four years. It was finally released in 2005.

== Plot ==
Ellie Parker is the story of an Australian actress struggling to make it in Hollywood. Ellie is young enough to still go to auditions back and forth across Los Angeles, changing wardrobes and slapping on makeup en route, but just old enough that the future feels "more like a threat than a promise". She lives with her vacuous musician boyfriend (Mark Pellegrino), who leaves her just about as dissatisfied as any other part of her life, and has a loose definition of the word "fidelity". Helping make sense of their surreal and humiliating Hollywood existence is her best friend Sam (Rebecca Rigg), another out-of-work actress trying her hand at design, who attends acting classes with Ellie to stay sharp. When Ellie gets into a fender bender with a guy who claims he is a cinematographer (Scott Coffey), her perspective on her work and the dating world starts to change. Chevy Chase also makes an appearance playing Ellie's agent.

== Cast ==
- Naomi Watts as Ellie Parker
- Rebecca Rigg as Sam
- Scott Coffey as Chris
- Mark Pellegrino as Justin
- Chevy Chase as Dennis Swartzbaum
- Jennifer Syme as Casting Chick
- Jessicka as Acting Class Student
- Keanu Reeves as Dogstar bassist (himself)

== Production ==
Watts, Coffey, and Pellegrino all worked together on David Lynch's Mulholland Drive, where Watts had her breakout performance, and Ellie Parker grew out of the friendship forged between Watts and director and screenwriter Coffey. It was shot on digital video over the course of five years, having begun its life as a series of shorts featuring Watts' character.

The film centers on a quote from the prologue to William Shakespeare's Henry V:

O for a Muse of fire, that would ascend
The brightest heaven of invention,
A kingdom for a stage, princes to act
And monarchs to behold the swelling scene!

== Reception ==
On the review aggregator website Rotten Tomatoes, 52% of 48 critics' reviews are positive. The website's consensus reads: "Despite some poignant commentary about struggling actors and Naomi Watts' inspired performance, Ellie Parker stutters in making the transition from short to feature length." Metacritic, which uses a weighted average, assigned the film a score of 51 out of 100, based on 22 critics, indicating "mixed or average" reviews.
