= Inland Empire (film) =

2006 film by David Lynch

- Theatrical release poster
- Directed by: David Lynch
- Written by: David Lynch
- Produced by: Mary Sweeney; David Lynch
- Starring: Laura Dern; Jeremy Irons; Justin Theroux; Harry Dean Stanton; Karolina Gruszka; Peter J. Lucas; Krzysztof Majchrzak; Julia Ormond
- Cinematography: David Lynch
- Edited by: David Lynch
- Music by: David Lynch; Marek Zebrowski
- Production companies: Absurda; StudioCanal; Fundacja Kultury; Camerimage
- Distributed by: 518 Media; Absurda (United States); StudioCanal (Note: Via Mars Distribution.) (France)
- Release dates: 6 September 2006 (Venice); 6 December 2006 (United States); 7 February 2007 (France); 27 April 2007 (Poland)
- Running time: 180 minutes
- Countries: United States; France; Poland
- Languages: English; Polish
- Budget: $3 million
- Box office: $4.4 million

Inland Empire is a 2006 film written, directed, shot, edited, and scored by David Lynch, who produced it alongside Mary Sweeney. The film stars Laura Dern as a Hollywood actress who begins to take on the personality of a character she plays in a supposedly cursed film production, causing fragmented and nightmarish events to unfold. It has defied categorization, with its genre being variously interpreted as drama, experimental, fantasy, horror, mystery, neo-noir, psychological thriller, and surrealist. (Note: Attributed to multiple sources.)

A co-production between the United States, France, and Poland, Inland Empire takes its name from a Californian metropolitan area. It was completed over a three-year period, shooting primarily in Los Angeles and Łódź. The process marked several firsts for Lynch: the film was shot without a finished screenplay, instead being largely developed on a scene-by-scene basis, and was filmed entirely by Lynch on low-resolution digital video with a handheld Sony DSR-PD150 camcorder.

The cast includes frequent Lynch collaborators such as Laura Dern, Justin Theroux, Harry Dean Stanton, and Grace Zabriskie, as well as Jeremy Irons, Karolina Gruszka, Peter J. Lucas, Krzysztof Majchrzak, and Julia Ormond. Brief appearances are made by additional actors including Terry Crews, Laura Harring, Nastassja Kinski, Diane Ladd, William H. Macy, and Mary Steenburgen. The voices of Harring, Naomi Watts, and Scott Coffey are also heard in scenes where characters watch excerpts of Lynch's short online horror series Rabbits (2002). The soundtrack features a variety of musicians such as Beck, Dave Brubeck, Kroke, Krzysztof Penderecki, and Nina Simone.

Inland Empire premiered at the 63rd Venice International Film Festival, where Lynch was awarded the Golden Lion for Lifetime Achievement. In a publicity stunt intended to increase Dern's chances of nomination for the Academy Award for Best Actress, which was ultimately unsuccessful, Lynch chatted to bystanders on Hollywood Boulevard while sitting in a director's chair placed between a live cow and a large poster of Dern. The film grossed $4.4 million on a budget of around $3 million. It was named the joint-second-best film of 2006 (Note: Shared with Quentin Tarantino's Death Proof and Jia Zhangke's Still Life.) by Cahiers du Cinéma, and was listed on Sight and Sound's films of the decade, as well as The Guardian's 10 most underrated movies of the decade. The film was remastered by Lynch and Janus Films in 2022. Lynch died in 2025, making Inland Empire his final feature film.

== Plot ==
=== Prologue ===
A crackling vinyl record announces that "Axxon N., the longest-running radio play in history", is turning to "a gray winter day in an old hotel". In a hotel room, the Lost Girl—a young Polish prostitute—has an unpleasant encounter with a client. Her face is blurred. After the encounter, her face becomes clear. She turns on the television and goes channel surfing, seeing an old Eastern European woman approaching a mansion before she flips to a show about anthropomorphic rabbits. She begins to cry.

=== Narrative ===
In Los Angeles, actress Nikki Grace is waiting for the results of her audition for the lead role in the film On High in Blue Tomorrows, a romantic drama about two people who have an affair. The old woman from the television screen visits her mansion. She asks Nikki about the film and then tells "an old tale": a boy passed through the doorway into the world, causing a reflection that gave birth to an evil that followed him. Then she tells a variation: a girl was lost in the marketplace—"as if half-born"—while the alley behind the marketplace was the way to the palace. The woman is certain that Nikki will get the role and insists that despite Nikki's claims to the contrary, the plot involves murder.

The next day, Nikki learns that she got the part. She celebrates with her friends while her Polish husband Piotrek watches from a distance. Devon, who plays the male lead, is warned to not sleep with Nikki, as he has a history of on-set affairs. Piotrek warns Devon of "dark consequences" for "wrong actions".

During the first rehearsal, the actors are interrupted by a disturbance on the set. Devon investigates but finds nothing. Shaken, the director confesses that they are shooting a remake of an unfinished German film entitled 47, itself based on a supposedly cursed Polish folktale. Production was abandoned after the two leads were found murdered "inside the story".

After filming the first few romantic scenes between their respective characters Sue and Billy, Nikki starts having difficulty distinguishing between the film script and real life. As in the script, Nikki starts a romantic affair with Devon. While they make love, she compares it to the script.

Nikki walks into an alley and enters a door named "Axxon N." It leads to the On High in Blue Tomorrows set, but also takes her back in time. Nikki realizes that she was the disturbance Devon investigated during the first rehearsal. She runs away and enters a set piece, which turns into an actual house. Inside the house, Nikki sees her husband going to bed. She hides from him in a closet, which transports her to a living room inhabited by a troupe of prostitutes.

=== Stream of consciousness ===
At this point, the narrative disintegrates into various plotlines and scenes, with the chronological order and the distinction between characters unclear or left to associations constructed by the audience.

- Nikki meets the prostitutes as they solicit customers on Hollywood Boulevard, and declares, "I'm a whore";
- A woman tells a policeman that she had been hypnotized to kill someone, and reveals that she has been stabbed in the stomach with a screwdriver;
- In 1930s Łódź, Poland, prostitutes interact with pimps;
- Nikki is stuck in a physically abusive marriage with her husband "Smithy" (played by the same actor as Piotrek). They live in a working-class home possibly located in Southern California's Inland Empire, which Polish men periodically visit;
- In the film, Sue confronts Billy in front of his family, professing her love. Doris, Billy's wife (played by the same actress as the woman with the screwdriver) repeatedly slaps her;
- In a room above a nightclub, Nikki/Sue tells a bespectacled man that she was sexually abused in her childhood and that her husband joined a traveling circus from Poland as a gamekeeper. She also speaks of the Phantom, a hypnotist who worked at the circus and then disappeared;
- The woman with the screwdriver remembers that the Phantom hypnotized her to kill Sue.
- Recalling the first meeting with the old woman, a 2nd visitor (played by Mary Steenburgen) tells Nikki/Sue that their family owes a debt to a neighbor called Crimp. Nikki/Sue has an unsettling encounter with him (played by same actor for the Phantom).

Feeling stalked by the Phantom, Nikki/Sue arms herself with a screwdriver. She sees both herself and Doris on Hollywood Boulevard, and meets with the policeman above the nightclub. When she leaves, Doris stabs her with her own screwdriver. Nikki/Sue collapses at a bus stop next to three homeless people. A homeless woman tells all kinds of strange stories about her friend Niko and her pet monkey. Another holds a lighter in front of Sue's face until she dies. A crane shot reveals that Nikki is shooting her final scene of the film.

=== Climax ===
In a daze, Nikki wanders off set and into a nearby movie theater, where she sees not only On High in Blue Tomorrows but events occurring in real-time. She follows the bespectacled man upstairs and enters an apartment marked "Axxon N". Confronted by the Phantom, Nikki shoots him. The Phantom transforms into a grotesque figure with a face resembling Nikki's before dying. Nikki flees into Room 47, which houses the rabbits on television – though she fails to see them – and then meets the Lost Girl. The two women kiss and embrace, and Nikki fades away. The Lost Girl escapes from the hotel and into Smithy's house, where she happily embraces her husband and son. Nikki is back at her mansion.

The film ends with a celebration involving the troupe of prostitutes, a one-legged woman mentioned earlier, Niko and her pet monkey, and others. The women dance to Nina Simone's "Sinnerman", while a lumberjack saws a log.

== Cast ==
- Laura Dern as Nikki Grace / Sue Blue
- Jeremy Irons as Kingsley Stewart
- Justin Theroux as Devon Berk / Billy Side
- Harry Dean Stanton as Freddie Howard
- Julia Ormond as Doris Side
- Diane Ladd as Marilyn Levens
- Peter J. Lucas as Piotrek Krol / Smithy
- Grace Zabriskie as Visitor #1
- Mary Steenburgen as Visitor #2
- Karolina Gruszka as Lost Girl
- Krzysztof Majchrzak as Phantom
- Ian Abercrombie as Henry, The Butler
- Nae Yūki as Street Woman
- Amanda Foreman as Tracy
- Terry Crews as Street Man
- William H. Macy as The Announcer
- Tracy Ashton as Marine's Sister
- Leon Niemczyk as Marek
- Jan Hencz as Janek
- Jordan Ladd as Terri
- Terryn Westbrook as Chelsi
- Laura Harring as Jane Rabbit / Party Guest
- Scott Coffey as Jack Rabbit
- Naomi Watts as Suzie Rabbit
- David Lynch (voice) as Bucky, The Gaffer
- Nastassja Kinski as The Lady
- Dominique Vandenberg as Trainyard Worker
- Cameron Daddo as Devon Berk's Manager
- Ben Harper as Piano Player (uncredited)

== Themes and analysis ==
[T]he structure of Inland Empire differs from prior Lynch films, Lost Highway or Mulholland Drive. It is neither a Möbius strip that endlessly circles around itself, nor is it divisible into sections of fantasy and reality. Its structure is more akin to a web where individual moments hyperlink to each other and other Lynch films—hence the musical number that closes the film which contains obvious allusions to everything from Blue Velvet to Twin Peaks.

— Zoran Samardžija, 2010

When asked about Inland Empire, Lynch refrained from explaining the film, responding that it is "about a woman in trouble, and it's a mystery, and that's all I want to say about it." When presenting screenings of the digital work, Lynch sometimes opened with a loosely-translated version of the Mundaka Upanishad:

We are like the spider. We weave our life and then move along in it. We are like the dreamer who dreams and then lives in the dream. This is true for the entire universe.

Lynch's Darkened Room has been analyzed by Kristina Šekrst as a precursor to Inland Empire, creating the Lost Girl motif, along with sharing the same symbolism of the cigarette-burn hole in a silk slip and the watch. New York Film Festival official Richard Peña summarized the film as "a plotless collection of snippets that explore themes Lynch has been working on for years", including "a Hollywood story about a young actress who gets a part in a film that might be cursed; a story about the smuggling of women from Eastern Europe; and an abstract story about a family of people with rabbit heads sitting around in a living room." The Guardian critic Peter Bradshaw called the film "a meditation on the unacknowledged and unnoticed strangeness of Hollywood and movie-making in general", adding that Lynch "establishes a bizarre series of worm-holes between the worlds of myth, movies and reality." Critic Mark Fisher wrote that the film "often seems like a series of dream sequences floating free of any grounding reality, a dream without a dreamer [in which] no frame is secure", but argued that "it is the film that is mad, not the characters in it ... it is Hollywood itself that is dreaming". He also commented that "to see Lynch's worlds captured on digital video makes for a bizarre short-circuiting: as if we are witnessing a direct feed from the unconscious".

Dennis Lim of Slate described the film as "a three-hour waking nightmare that derives both its form and its content from the splintering psyche of a troubled Hollywood actress", and commented on Lynch's use of digital video, describing it as "the medium of home movies, viral video, and pornography—the everyday media detritus we associate more with ... intimate or private viewing experiences than communal ones", adding that the film "progresses with the darting, associative logic of hyperlinks". Scholar Anne Jerslev has argued that the film "constitutes multiple and fractured modes of perception in a world of digital screens". Jerslev further contends that the film features "formal similarities with a website's hyperlinked layering of screens/windows, constantly disclosing new worlds from new points of view", but according to theorist Steven Shaviro "it also builds on cinematic codes, even as it deconstructs them".

David Sweeney interprets Inland Empire as a film that is, at least thematically, about reincarnation. He connects this theme to Lynch's interest in Theosophy and draws parallels with James Joyce's Ulysses and the Netflix series The OA, highlighting shared motifs of reincarnation and alternate lives.

The Austin Chronicle's Marc Savlov wrote that Inland Empire "revels in a kind of post-9/11 dissociative disorder as perpetual panic attack". During an interview about Lost Highway (1997), Lynch was asked about whether he "ever had that feeling of dissociation from yourself". He responded, "Oh, yeah. There's really many characters inside of us".

== Production ==
=== Background ===
Inland Empire was the first Lynch feature to be completely shot in digital video; it was shot in standard definition with a hand-held Sony DSR-PD150 by Lynch himself. Lynch stated that he would no longer use film to make motion pictures. He explained his preference, stating that the medium gives one "more room to dream", and more options in post-production. Much of the project was shot in Łódź, Poland, with local actors, such as Karolina Gruszka, Krzysztof Majchrzak, Leon Niemczyk, Piotr Andrzejewski and artists of the local circus Cyrk Zalewski. Some filming was also done in Los Angeles, and Lynch returned from Poland in 2006 to complete it. He then edited the final results in Final Cut Pro in his home office over a six-month period. He edited the film alone without input from his then-wife Mary Sweeney, who often edited his films, which she attributed to the lack of "a real organized script to go by [...] no one knew what was going on except him".

Lynch shot the film without a complete screenplay. Instead, he handed each actor several pages of freshly written dialogue each day. In a 2005 interview, he described his feelings about the shooting process: "I've never worked on a project in this way before. I don't know exactly how this thing will finally unfold ... This film is very different because I don't have a script. I write the thing scene by scene and much of it is shot and I don't have much of a clue where it will end. It's a risk, but I have this feeling that because all things are unified, this idea over here in that room will somehow relate to that idea over there in the pink room."

Interviewed at the Venice Film Festival, Laura Dern admitted that she did not know what Inland Empire was about or the role she was playing, but hoped that seeing the film's premiere at the festival would help her "learn more". Justin Theroux also stated, "I couldn't possibly tell you what the film's about, and at this point, I don't know that [David Lynch] could. It's become sort of a pastime—Laura and I sit around on set trying to figure out what's going on." In an NPR interview, Dern recounted a conversation she had with Jeremy Alter, one of the film's newer producers; he had asked her if Lynch was joking when he requested a one-legged woman, a monkey, and a lumberjack by 3:15 p.m. Dern replied, "Yeah, you're on a David Lynch movie, dude. Sit back and enjoy the ride." They began filming with the individuals Lynch had requested by 4 p.m.

=== Financing and distribution ===
Lynch financed much of the production from his own resources, with longtime artistic collaborator and ex-wife Mary Sweeney producing. The film was also partially financed by the French production company StudioCanal, which had provided funding for three previous Lynch films. StudioCanal wanted to enter the film in the 2006 Cannes Film Festival. Instead, it premiered at Italy's Venice Film Festival on 6 September 2006, where David Lynch also received the Golden Lion for Lifetime Achievement award for his "contributions to the art of cinema". The film premiered in the United States on 8 October 2006 at the New York Film Festival. The film received a limited release in the US beginning on 15 December 2006; distribution was handled by the specialist company 518 Media.

Lynch hoped to distribute the film independently, saying that with the entire industry changing, he thought he would attempt a new form of distribution as well. He acquired the rights to the DVD and worked out a deal with StudioCanal in an arrangement that allowed him to distribute the film himself, through both digital and traditional means. A North American DVD release occurred on 14 August 2007. Among other special features, the DVD included a 75-minute featurette, More Things That Happened, which compiled footage elaborating on Sue's marriage to Smithy, her unpleasant life story, the Phantom's influence on women, and the lives of the prostitutes on Hollywood Boulevard. 15 years after the North American DVD release, The Criterion Collection released a two-disc Blu-ray on 21 March 2023.

=== Soundtrack ===
David Lynch's Inland Empire Soundtrack

Soundtrack album by Various artists
- Released: 11 September 2007
- Genres: Soundtrack; ambient; pop
- Length: 79:26
- Labels: Ryko; Absurda; David Lynch Music Company

Lynch contributed a number of his own compositions to the film's soundtrack, marking a departure from his frequent collaborations with composer Angelo Badalamenti. His pieces range from minimalist ambient music to more pop-oriented tracks such as "Ghost of Love". Polish composer Marek Zebrowski wrote music for the film, and acted as music consultant. The soundtrack includes the following musical pieces:

1. David Lynch – "Ghost of Love" (5:30)
2. David Lynch – "Rabbits Theme" (0:59)
3. Mantovani – "Colors of My Life" (3:50)
4. David Lynch – "Woods Variation" (12:19)
5. Dave Brubeck – "Three to Get Ready" (5:22)
6. Boguslaw Schaeffer – "Klavier Konzert" (5:26)
7. Kroke – "The Secrets of the Life Tree" (3:27)
8. Little Eva – "The Locomotion" (2:24)
9. Etta James – "At Last" (3:00)
10. David Lynch – "Call from the Past" (2:58)
11. Krzysztof Penderecki – "Als Jakob erwachte" (7:27)
12. Witold Lutoslawski – "Novelette Conclusion" (excerpt) / Joey Altruda – "Lisa" (edit) (3:42)
13. Beck – "Black Tambourine" (film version) (2:47)
14. David Lynch – "Mansion Theme" (2:18)
15. David Lynch – "Walkin' on the Sky" (4:04)
16. David Lynch / Marek Zebrowski – "Polish Night Music No. 1" (4:18)
17. David Lynch / Chrysta Bell – "Polish Poem" (5:55)
18. Nina Simone – "Sinnerman" (edit) (6:40)

== Release and reception ==
=== Distribution and box office ===
The film was screened at several film festivals around the world, most notably the Venice Film Festival, the New York Film Festival, the Thessaloniki Film Festival, the Camerimage Film Festival, the Fajr International Film Festival, the San Francisco IndieFest, the International Film Festival Rotterdam and the Mexico City International Contemporary Film Festival.

In October 2006, Lynch bought US distribution rights to the film from StudioCanal, which he would retain in any later deals made. The following month, he announced his intent to self-distribute the film theatrically via his company Absurda and 518 Media, stating: "A conventional distributor is a heartache, and I'm finished with that. With self-distribution, I'm able to shape the outcome of the film so much more." Lynch embarked on a 10-city promotional tour in January 2007 with a cow, explaining "I ate a lot of cheese during the film, and it made me happy. I'm looking forward to meeting theater owners and getting out among the people with the cow." Lynch signed a service deal with Rhino Entertainment, which distributed the film on home video with Ryko Distribution on 14 August 2007.

518 Media released Inland Empire to two theaters in the United States on 6 December 2006, grossing a total of $27,508 over its opening weekend. It later expanded to its widest release of fifteen nationwide theaters, ultimately grossing $861,355 at the American box office. In other countries outside the United States, Inland Empire grossed $3,176,222, bringing the film's worldwide total gross to $4,037,577. It was released on 20 August 2007 in the United Kingdom, by Optimum Releasing, 4 October 2007 in the Benelux, by A-Film, and 6 August 2008 in Australia, by Madman Entertainment.

=== Critical response ===
On review aggregator Rotten Tomatoes, 72% of 118 critics gave the film a positive review, with an average rating of 7.6/10. The website's critical consensus reads: "Typical David Lynch fare: fans of the director will find Inland Empire seductive and deep. All others will consider the heady surrealism impenetrable and pointless." On Metacritic, the film has a weighted average score of 73 out of 100, based on 25 critics, indicating "generally favorable" reviews.

Manohla Dargis of The New York Times classified Inland Empire as "fitfully brilliant" after the New York Film Festival screening. Peter Travers, the film critic for Rolling Stone magazine wrote, "My advice, in the face of such hallucinatory brilliance, is that you hang on." The New Yorker was one of the few publications to offer any negative points about the film, calling it a "trenchant, nuanced film" that "quickly devolves into self-parody". Jonathan Ross, presenter of the BBC programme Film 2007, described it as "a work of genius ... I think". Damon Wise of Empire magazine gave it five stars, calling it "A dazzling and exquisitely original riddle as told by an enigma" and Jim Emerson (editor of RogerEbert.com) gave it 4 stars out of 4: "When people say Inland Empire is Lynch's Sunset Boulevard, Lynch's Persona or Lynch's 8½, they're quite right, but it also explicitly invokes connections to Stanley Kubrick's The Shining, Jean-Luc Godard's Pierrot le Fou, Buñuel and Dalí 's Un Chien Andalou, Maya Deren's LA-experimental Meshes of the Afternoon (a Lynch favorite) and others". However, Carina Chocano of the Los Angeles Times wrote that "the film, which begins promisingly, disappears down so many rabbit holes (one of them involving actual rabbits) that eventually it just disappears for good".

Inland Empire tied the second-best film of 2007 by Cahiers du Cinéma and was listed among Sight & Sound's films of the decade, as well as The Guardian's "10 most underrated movies of the decade". In 2025, it was one of the films voted for the "Readers' Choice" edition of The New York Times' list of "The 100 Best Movies of the 21st Century," finishing at number 164. In The Ringer's 2025 list of "101 Best Movie Performances of the 21st Century", Dern was placed 19th.

=== Legacy ===
Inland Empire has been named as an example of the liminal space aesthetic, with Owen Gleiberman of Variety citing the film as a progenitor to the 2026 psychological horror film Backrooms.

Inland Empire also served as an influence to the analog horror web series known as Petscop. In addition, the film inspired numerous horror works including a short film-turned-web series No Through Road.

The name "Inland Empire" is used in the 2019 detective video game Disco Elysium to describe a skill used by the protagonist.

=== Restoration ===
Inland Empire was restored and remastered by Janus Films in 2022, and was screened throughout the year beginning on April 8. The restoration of the film and soundtrack was overseen by David Lynch. For the restoration the original upscaled HD footage from the editing process was first downscaled back to standard definition to discard "false detail", then converted to 4K using an AI upscaling algorithm. This version of the film was released on Blu-Ray by The Criterion Collection.

=== Accolades ===
Lynch attempted to promote Dern's performance and increase her chances of scoring nomination for the 2007 Academy Award for Best Actress by campaigning with a live cow, though she was ultimately not recognized by the members of the Academy.

Wins
Award ceremony	Category	Recipient(s)
National Society of Film Critics Awards	Best Experimental Film	Inland Empire
Venice Film Festival	Future Film Festival Digital Award	David Lynch
Nominations
Award ceremony	Category	Nominee(s)
Chlotrudis Awards	Best Movie	Inland Empire
Chlotrudis Awards	Best Director	David Lynch
Chlotrudis Awards	Best Actress	Laura Dern
Chlotrudis Awards	Best Supporting Actress	Grace Zabriskie
Chlotrudis Awards	Best Visual Design	Inland Empire
National Society of Film Critics Awards	Best Actress	Laura Dern
New York Film Critics Online Awards	Best Picture	Inland Empire
Russian National Movie Awards	Best Independent Movie	Inland Empire
Stinkers Bad Movie Awards	Most Overrated Film	Inland Empire
Stinkers Bad Movie Awards	Worst Sense of Direction	David Lynch
Stinkers Bad Movie Awards	Most Annoying Fake Accent: Female	Grace Zabriskie
Toronto Film Critics Association Awards	Best Actress	Laura Dern

== See also ==
- List of cult films
