= Adult World =

2013 film directed by Scott Coffey

- Theatrical release poster
- Directed by: Scott Coffey
- Written by: Andy Cochran
- Produced by: Justin Nappi; Joy Gorman Wettels; Alex Goldstone; Kevin Turen; Manu Gargi; Michael Heller
- Starring: Emma Roberts; Evan Peters; John Cusack; Armando Riesco; Shannon Woodward; Reed Birney; Catherine Lloyd Burns
- Cinematography: James Laxton
- Edited by: Gina Hirsch; David Heinz
- Music by: BC Smith
- Production companies: Treehouse Pictures; Anonymous Content
- Distributed by: IFC Films
- Release dates: April 18, 2013 (Tribeca Film Festival); February 14, 2014 (United States)
- Running time: 97 minutes
- Country: United States
- Language: English
- Box office: $19,731

Adult World is a 2013 American comedy-drama film directed by Scott Coffey and written by Andy Cochran. The film stars Emma Roberts, Evan Peters, and John Cusack. It premiered at the Tribeca Film Festival on April 18, 2013, and was released to select theaters and through video on demand on February 14, 2014, by IFC Films.

== Plot ==
Recent college graduate Amy believes she's destined to be a great poet. Pressed by her parents to earn a living, she takes a job at a small sex shop, Adult World, where she works with the manager, Alex. When her car is stolen, her parents discover that she had canceled the car's theft insurance to afford submission fees for poetry journals, and call her a child, which causes her to pack and leave. She briefly moves in with a coworker, trans woman Rubia, before finding her own apartment.

She meets one of her favorite poets, Rat Billings, and talks her way into being his protégée by offering to clean his house. After some cajoling, Billings reads her poetry and offers to feature her work in an anthology he is working on. One night, she gets drunk and makes a clumsy attempt to seduce him, but he rebuffs her advances.

Alex fires Amy after she fails to catch a shoplifter; angered, she says she is too good to work there. She soon discovers that she misses Alex, however, and realizes that she has feelings for him. She apologizes to him and asks for her job back. Alex rehires her, and they begin hanging out. At Amy's birthday party, Billings gives her a copy of the poetry anthology he featured her work in—Shit Poems: An Anthology of Bad Verse. Furious and humiliated, she confronts him and calls him a has-been. She goes home and tries to commit suicide by asphyxiating herself with a plastic bag, but changes her mind at the last second.

The next day, she makes peace with Billings: he tells her that she needs to do more living before she can fulfill her potential as a writer, while she tells him not to take himself so seriously. Later, she sleeps with Alex, and they become a couple. She finds out she has been published in an erotica magazine that she submitted prose to as a joke. She and Alex go to a party together to celebrate, and he encourages her to keep writing. The film ends with Amy reading Shit Poems with a smile on her face.

In the epilogue, next to the credits, she becomes a well-known poet and arranges her first poetry book on a shelf in a bookstore to be more prominently shown.

== Cast ==
- Emma Roberts as Amy Anderson, a 22-year-old woman who aspires to be a famous and successful poet
- Evan Peters as Alex, a painter who works at a porn store with Amy
- John Cusack as Rat Billings, a broody writer that Amy aspires to be like
- Armando Riesco as Rubia, a trans woman who becomes Amy's closest friend
- Shannon Woodward as Candace, Amy's cliché friend
- Chris Riggi as Josh
- Scott Coffey as Bookstore Owner
- Jo Mei as Yumi
- Leah Lauren as Maggie
- Cloris Leachman as Mary Anne
- John Cullum as Stan
- Catherine Lloyd Burns as Sheryl

== Production ==
Principal photography took place over three and a half weeks in February and March 2012 in Syracuse, New York. Local landmarks such as Syracuse University, the Carrier Dome, Little Italy, Clinton Square, and the green-over-red traffic light on Tipperary Hill appear in the film.

An actual sex shop named Adult World exists in Syracuse, but it is several miles away on a different street and was not used in the production. A vacant storefront in the Little Italy neighborhood was used for the location of the shop in the movie. The building was one of four contiguous structures damaged beyond repair in a large fire in August 2018 and was demolished soon after.

Canadian singer-songwriter Dan Boeckner contributed many of the songs in the film, along with music by his bands Handsome Furs and Divine Fits.

== Release ==
The film had its world premiere at the Tribeca Film Festival on April 18, 2013. Shortly after the premiere, it was announced IFC Films had acquired distribution rights to the film. The film also premiered at the Syracuse International Film Festival on October 6, 2013 The film was released in a limited release and through video on demand beginning on February 14, 2014. The film was released in the United Kingdom on August 4, 2014, on DVD and was released in Sweden on May 11, 2015, through DVD.

== Marketing ==
The first official trailer and poster were released on January 17, 2014.

== Reception ==
On the review aggregator website Rotten Tomatoes, 53% of 34 critics' reviews are positive. The website's consensus reads: "A mixed bag of uneven tone occasionally saved by John Cusack's astute performance leaves the audience to fend for themselves in this Adult World." Metacritic, which uses a weighted average, assigned the film a score of 61 out of 100, based on 19 critics, indicating "generally favorable" reviews. Andrew O'Hehir of Salon praised Roberts and Cusack's performances, calling it Cusack's "best role in years."

The Village Voice described the film as "a terrific small-budget indie" and "weirdly moving", and praised Roberts' performance as "both breezy and carefully tuned."

The film's review in the Los Angeles Times concludes: "Brimming with sharp asides and clever throwaways (Billings' passing parsing of nom de plume and nom de guerre, for one), plus astute observations on literary pretension and misguided youth, "Adult World" is a winner."

The New York Times calls the film a "smart but wince-inducing satirical comedy" and Cusack's character as Rat Billings "a sardonic, understated portrayal."

== Home media ==
On June 10, 2014, the film was released on DVD in the United States and was released on DVD in the United Kingdom on August 4, 2014, and in Sweden on May 11, 2015.
