= Rabbits (web series) =

2002 web series

- Screenshot illustrating the three rabbits in the single set.
- Created by: David Lynch
- Starring: Scott Coffey; Laura Harring; Naomi Watts; Rebekah Del Rio
- Composer: Angelo Badalamenti
- Country of origin: United States
- Original language: English
- No. of episodes: 8

Original release
- Release: 2002

Rabbits is a 2002 surrealist horror web series created by David Lynch. The series depicts three humanoid rabbits, played by Scott Coffey, Laura Elena Harring (Note: In episode three, Rebekah Del Rio stands in for Laura Elena Harring.) and Naomi Watts, who inhabit a living room. Their disjointed, bizarre conversations are occasionally interrupted by a laugh track. Rabbits is presented with the tagline "In a nameless city deluged by a continuous rain... three rabbits live with a fearful mystery". Lynch himself referred to the series as a sitcom.

Rabbits originally consisted of eight digitally-filmed episodes shown exclusively on Lynch's website. The films were made available on DVD in the 2008 Lime Green Box Set collection of Lynch's films, in a re-edited four-episode version that does not contain episode three. In 2020, select episodes of the series were uploaded to Lynch's official YouTube channel.

The set and some footage of the Rabbits were reused in Lynch's 2006 feature film Inland Empire.

== Description ==
Rabbits takes place entirely within a single box set representing the living room of a house. Within the set, three humanoid rabbits enter, exit, and converse. One, Jack, is male and wears a dark-colour suit. The other two, Suzie and Jane, are female; the latter wears a dress, the first, a dressing gown, both being of pink hues.

The audience watches from about the position of a television set.

In each episode, the rabbits converse in apparent non sequiturs. The lines evoke mystery, and include the following: "Were you blonde?", "Something's wrong.", "I only wish they would go somewhere.", "It had something to do with the telling of time.", and "No one must find out about this." The disordered but seemingly related lines the rabbits speak suggest that the dialogue could be pieced together into sensible conversations, but concrete interpretations are elusive.

Some of the rabbits' lines are punctuated by a seemingly random laugh track, as if being filmed before a live audience. In addition, whenever one of the rabbits enters the room, the unseen audience whoops and applauds at great length, much like in a sitcom. The rabbits themselves, however, remain serious throughout.

In some episodes, mysterious events take place, including the appearance of a burning hole in the wall and the intrusion of a deep voice coming from a disfigured face projected on the back wall, suspended in a sinister red light. Three episodes involve a solo performance by one rabbit, in which he or she recites or sings an enigmatic text, as if performing a ritual.

The rabbits receive a telephone call at one point, and later, at the climax of the series, a knock is heard at the door. When the door is opened, a loud scream is heard and the image is distorted. After the door closes, Jack says that it was "the man in the green suit". The last episode concludes with the rabbits huddled together on the couch and Jane saying: "I wonder who I will be."

Series tagline

"In a nameless city deluged by a continuous rain... three rabbits live with a fearful mystery".

== Characters and cast ==
- Suzie: (Note: Some sources call the character Suzie Rabbit but the credits list her simply as Suzie.) Naomi Watts
- Jack: (Note: Some sources call the character Jack Rabbit but the credits list him simply as Jack.) Scott Coffey
- Jane: (Note: Some sources call the character Jane Rabbit but the credits list her simply as Jane.) Laura Elena Harring/Rebekah Del Rio
- The Red Rabbit: a big disfigured face, suspended in a reddish haze and "talking backwards"
- The Man in the Green Suit: offscreen, silent

== Production ==
Lynch filmed Rabbits in a set built in the garden of his house in the Hollywood Hills. Filming took place at night in order to control the lighting. Lynch says that filming Watts, Harring and Coffey with the set lit up by enormous lights was "a beautiful thing". However, the process generated a lot of noise that echoed from the surrounding hills and annoyed Lynch's neighbors.

The series was shot digitally, with three cameras, and mostly from one single camera position.

As with most of Lynch's films and TV productions, the score was composed by Angelo Badalamenti.

The original duration of each episode varies (between 5 and 7 minutes approximately).

The series was originally uploaded from 8 June 2002 onwards on Lynch's official website (Note: The episodes were gradually uploaded on davidlynch.com, with access available through subscription.) with the tagline,"In a nameless city deluged by a continuous rain... three rabbits live with a fearful mystery"

The rabbit costumes worn by the cast were designed, sculpted and fabricated by Tony Candelaria in 2001.

== Reception and themes ==
Rabbits received positive reviews, praising the production for its lighting, sound design and scary atmosphere. The set and the actions of the characters suggest that the fiction takes place in the 1950s and that the Rabbits are a family.

In her book about Lynch, Anne Jersey noted a certain distortion in the figuration of the characters, maybe due to the fact that "the voice of the actors are not accompanied by the rabbits' mouths moving and [...] the somewhat stiff doll-like movements of the rabbits."

Dave Kehr noted in The New York Times that it was Alain Resnais who first put giant rodent heads on his actors in his 1980 film Mon oncle d'Amérique. The dialogue between the Rabbits has been described as Beckettian. The use of lighting to create shadows and set an uneasy atmosphere has been noted by various commentators.

A comment in The Artifice indicated that the shorts could be approached as a genuine sitcom: 'It is not merely parody or satire; it exists as perhaps the most bizarre and arguably literal sitcom imaginable, though still an opposing force that challenges and defamiliarizes basic concepts. The bare-bone necessities are present, and are presented appropriately, but in our minds we acknowledge that there is something distinct about it from familiar sitcoms, yet we are still able to recognize it as such, a sitcom." In his book about Lynch, Greg Olson wrote that, with Rabbits, the director had explored "the existential mystery of daily domesticity". For Martha Nochimson, author of David Lynch Swerves, the three main characters in the shorts are "icons of faith".

== Use in Inland Empire ==
Lynch used some of the Rabbits footage as well as previously unseen footage featuring Rabbits characters (although unnamed this time) in his film Inland Empire (2006). He also used the Rabbits set to shoot several scenes involving human characters in the same film, in which, although excerpts of the series appear as such, the Rabbits are associated with three mysterious Polish characters who live in a house in the woods.

== DVD release ==
Most of Rabbits can be found on the "Mystery disk" in the 10-DVD collection The Lime Green Set released by Absurda in 2008. This DVD features seven of the eight episodes, though several of the episodes have been edited together. "Episode 1" on the DVD contains "Episode 1", "Episode 2" and "Episode 4" from the website. "Episode 2" on the DVD contains "Episode 6" and "Episode 8" from the website. "Scott" and "Naomi" are the same as "Episode 5" and "Episode 7", respectively. "Episode 3" from the website does not appear on the disc. The DVD's running time is 43 minutes instead of the original 50 minutes. The other seven minutes consist of title and credit sequences for each individual episode, that were edited out.

== Use in psychological research ==
A clip excerpt from Rabbits (and chosen because it was supposed to "make participants feel unpleasantly uncomfortable") was used as a stimulus in a psychological experiment on the effects of acetaminophen on existential crisis. The research, whose result was published in a paper entitled "The Common Pain of Surrealism and Death", suggested that acetaminophen acted to suppress the compensatory desire to affirm systems of meaning that the act of viewing surrealist works has been shown to produce.
