= Rebekah Del Rio =

American singer-songwriter (1967–2025)

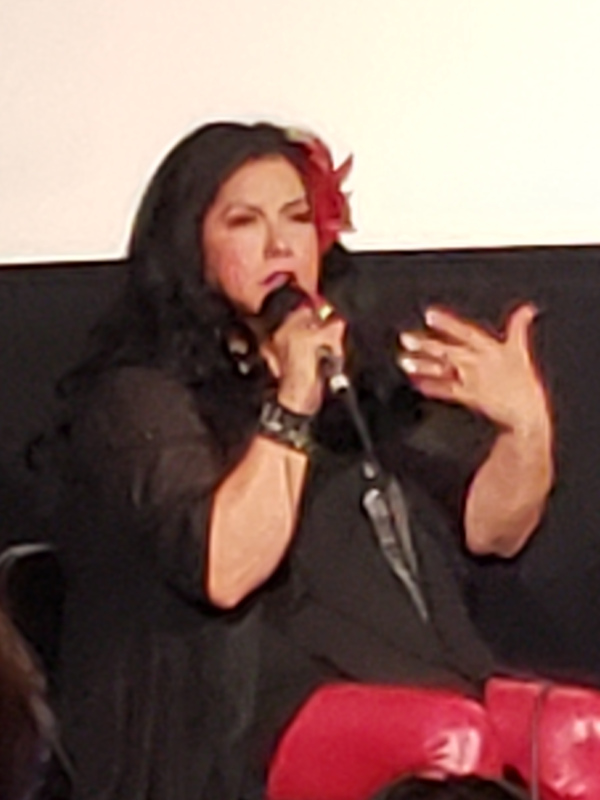
- Del Rio in 2021

Background information
- Born: July 10, 1967; Chula Vista, California, U.S.
- Origin: Chula Vista, California, U.S.
- Died: June 23, 2025 (aged 57) Los Angeles, California, U.S.
- Genres: Soft rock; easy listening; Latin jazz
- Years active: 1994–2025
- Labels: Baja Basement Records; DreamWorks Nashville; Giant Records

Rebekah Del Rio (née Coronado; July 10, 1967 – June 23, 2025) was an American singer-songwriter and actress from Chula Vista, California.

The San Diego Union-Tribune voted Del Rio one of the "Top 10 Singers in San Diego", after which she moved to Los Angeles in 1989 to further develop her career. After recording the song "Llorando", a Spanish-language version of Roy Orbison's "Crying", she moved to Nashville in 1994. There, she was signed to Irving Azoff's label, Giant Records, and recorded her first album, Nobody's Angel. The title track was released on a compilation album. According to a 2022 interview Del Rio gave in The Guardian, “Nobody’s Angel” reached No. 2 on the singles charts in the Netherlands.

Her vocals can be heard on numerous soundtracks including Sin City, Streets of Legend, Man on Fire, and Mia Sarah. Del Rio made a cameo appearance in David Lynch's 2001 film Mulholland Drive, singing "Llorando" a cappella. She was also featured in Richard Kelly's film Southland Tales, providing solo vocals in a string arrangement of "The Star-Spangled Banner". She performed the song "No Stars", written in collaboration with David Lynch and John Neff, at the end of Part 10 of Twin Peaks: The Return. Moby joined Del Rio onstage on guitar.

== Background ==
Rebekah Coronado was born on July 10, 1967, and began using the surname Del Rio when she started singing professionally.

== Performance in Mulholland Drive ==
Del Rio appears in a scene in the neo-noir film Mulholland Drive in which she sings in the Club Silencio. After hearing her sing "Llorando" (the Spanish version of Roy Orbison's "Crying") at his home studio on the suggestion of the music agent Brian Loucks, Lynch then invited her to perform in the film, which he called "a happy accident."

Del Rio's emotional rendition of the song inspired the creation and development of the scene itself. In his book The Impossible David Lynch, Todd McGowan describes Del Rio's performance with the phrase "the voice as the impossible object." In the nightclub scene, Del Rio is introduced as "La Llorona de Los Ángeles" (Crying Woman of Los Angeles), who belts out the song, only to faint onstage while the song continues playing, revealing that she was lip-synching. Film critic Zina Giannopoulou interprets the song's performance and the (symbolic) death of the singer as a parallel to the relationship between the two female doppelgänger characters, Diane/Betty and Rita/Camilla.

== Personal life and death ==
Del Rio had a son, Philip C. DeMars, in 1986. He died in 2009 at the age of 23.

According to the Los Angeles Medical Examiner, Del Rio died at her home on June 23, 2025, at the age of 57. The cause of her death was due to morphine and codeine effects. She had undergone surgery for a brain tumor some years prior, and had been diagnosed with cancer again shortly before she died. Less than two weeks before her death, Del Rio performed live at a Mulholland Drive screening charity event for the Philosophical Research Society in Los Angeles.

== Discography ==
- Nobody's Angel (1994)
- Mulholland Drive soundtrack – "Llorando" (2001)
- All My Life/Toda Mi Vida (2003)
- Southland Tales soundtrack – "Star Spangled Banner" (2008)
- Love Hurts Love Heals (2011)
- Wicked Game – "Llorando" duet with Il Divo (2011)

== See also ==
- Rabbits
