= Darkened Room =

- Directed by: David Lynch
- Written by: David Lynch
- Produced by: David Lynch
- Starring: Jordan Ladd; Etsuko Shikata; Cerina Vincent
- Cinematography: David Lynch
- Release date: April 12, 2002
- Running time: 8 minutes
- Country: United States
- Language: English

Darkened Room is a 2002 short surrealist experimental psychological drama film written, directed, shot, and produced by David Lynch. It first appeared on Lynch's website and was subsequently released on the DVD Dynamic:01.

== Plot ==
A Japanese woman (Etsuko Shikata) shows the viewer her apartment in Tokyo and muses on the amount of bananas produced worldwide, before telling the viewer that her friend next door is sad. The scene cuts to an American woman (Jordan Ladd) crying on a sofa when a second American woman (Cerina Vincent) enters, says cruel things to her, and threatens to tell her "the truth". The film then fades to black.

== Cast ==
- Jordan Ladd as Girl #1
- Etsuko Shikata as Herself
- Cerina Vincent as Girl #2

== Production ==
The film was shot on digital video. In an introduction that appears on the Dynamic:01 DVD, Lynch called the film "an experiment based on some idea" and said it "was always some kind of tie in to bananas, information concerning bananas, so we can all learn some things as we enjoy the shows". He then laughs.

== Analysis ==
The film has been compared to other Lynch productions for the prominence of the act of crying and the presence of a lost girl. It has been suggested that Darkened Room served as an inspiration for several motifs in his film Inland Empire (2006), including the "lost girl" figure who represents entrapment and narrative disconnection. Key visual and thematic elements, such as the cigarette burn in a silk slip and the symbolic significance of a watch, are also echoed in Inland Empire. Jordan Ladd, who played the crying woman in Darkened Room, appeared in Inland Empire.

Kristina Šekrst argues that the short film uses performative speech acts to construct identity, particularly through the interactions between the two characters in the second half, drawing connections between Darkened Room and Lynch's later work while noting shared elements like the use of confined spaces to symbolize psychological entrapment and the layering of narrative realities.
