= Lost Highway (film) =

1997 film by David Lynch

- Theatrical release poster
- Directed by: David Lynch
- Written by: David Lynch; Barry Gifford
- Produced by: Mary Sweeney; Tom Sternberg; Deepak Nayar
- Starring: Bill Pullman; Patricia Arquette; Balthazar Getty; Robert Blake; Natasha Gregson Wagner; Gary Busey; Robert Loggia
- Cinematography: Peter Deming
- Edited by: Mary Sweeney
- Music by: Angelo Badalamenti; David Lynch (Note: Additional Music)
- Production companies: Ciby 2000; Asymmetrical Productions
- Distributed by: October Films; (United States); Ciby 2000; (France)
- Release dates: January 15, 1997 (France); January 1997 (Sundance); February 21, 1997 (United States)
- Running time: 134 minutes
- Countries: United States; France
- Language: English
- Budget: $15 million
- Box office: $3.9 million

Lost Highway is a 1997 surrealist neo-noir horror film directed by David Lynch, who co-wrote it with Barry Gifford. The film stars Bill Pullman, Patricia Arquette, and Balthazar Getty, as well as Robert Blake, Jack Nance, and Richard Pryor in all of their final film roles. It follows a man who receives unmarked VHS tapes showing footage of his home before he is abruptly arrested for his wife's murder, at which point he mysteriously disappears and is replaced by a young man leading a different life.

Financed by French production company Ciby 2000 and Lynch's own Asymmetrical Productions, the film was largely shot in Los Angeles, where Lynch collaborated with cinematographer Peter Deming and frequent producer and editor Mary Sweeney. The film's surreal narrative structure has been likened to a Möbius strip, while Lynch has described it as a "psychogenic fugue" rather than a conventionally logical story. Angelo Badalamenti and Barry Adamson scored the film, while the soundtrack, produced by Trent Reznor of Nine Inch Nails, features songs by David Bowie, Lou Reed, and Rammstein, as well as new recordings from Nine Inch Nails, Marilyn Manson, and the Smashing Pumpkins.

Lost Highway polarized critics upon release, with some initially dismissing it as incoherent; it has since been reappraised, garnering a cult following and scholarly interest. It was a box office failure, grossing $3.9 million on a budget of $15 million after a modest three-week run. It is the first of three Lynch films set in Los Angeles, followed by Mulholland Drive (2001) and his final film Inland Empire (2006). The film was adapted into an opera by Austrian composer Olga Neuwirth in 2003.

== Plot ==
Saxophonist Fred Madison receives a cryptic message on his intercom in the Hollywood Hills: "Dick Laurent is dead." Moments later, he hears tires screeching and sirens racing past his house. The next morning, his wife Renee finds a VHS tape on their porch that shows eerie footage of their house. That night, Fred struggles to have sex with Renee and confesses that he had a dream about her being attacked. As he looks at her, he briefly sees the face of a pale old man.

The following day, another tape arrives, this time showing footage of Fred and Renee sleeping in bed. They call the police, but the detectives offer little help. Fred and Renee attend a party hosted by her friend Andy, where Fred encounters a pale man who acts strangely and claims they have met before. The man insists he is currently at Fred's house, which he demonstrates by answering Fred's call to his home phone. Andy identifies the man as an acquaintance of Dick Laurent. Unnerved, Fred leaves the party with Renee.

The next morning, a new tape arrives that shows Fred standing over Renee's dismembered body. Fred is arrested and sentenced to death for her murder. On death row, Fred experiences intense headaches and visions of the pale man and a burning cabin in the desert, before being enveloped in light. The prison guards check on him, only to discover that he has inexplicably been replaced by Pete Dayton, a young auto mechanic from Van Nuys. Pete, seemingly unaware of how he ended up there, is released to his parents but remains under surveillance by detectives.

Pete returns to work, where his gangster client Mr. Eddy (identified by a detective as Laurent) visits for car repairs. Mr. Eddy takes Pete on a drive, where he and his men violently assault another driver, before offering Pete a pornographic VHS. The next day, Mr. Eddy arrives at the garage with his mistress, Alice Wakefield, who resembles Renee. Later that night, Alice returns alone and seduces Pete, initiating an affair. Alice grows fearful that Mr. Eddy suspects them and devises a plan to rob Andy and flee town. Meanwhile, Pete's girlfriend Sheila discovers the affair and leaves him. Pete later receives a disturbing call from Mr. Eddy and the pale man, which pushes him to agree to Alice's plan.

Pete confronts Andy at his house, but Andy dies after falling headfirst into the corner of a glass table. Pete discovers a photograph of Dick (who looks identical to Mr. Eddy), Andy, Alice, and Renee together, which causes his nose to bleed. Disoriented, he retreats to the bathroom but finds himself wandering the hallways of a hotel instead. Pete and Alice arrive at a remote desert cabin to sell stolen goods. They have sex outside, during which Alice taunts Pete by saying "you'll never have me" before disappearing into the cabin. In a flash of light, Pete transforms back into Fred.

Fred searches the cabin and finds the pale man, who tells him that "Alice" is in fact Renee. He pursues Fred with a video camera, but Fred escapes and finds Dick Laurent having sex with Renee at the Lost Highway Hotel. After Renee leaves, Fred kidnaps Dick and takes him to the desert. The pale man reappears and hands Fred a knife, with which he slits Dick's throat. Dick, confused, asks what they want. The pale man plays a pornographic video made by Dick which features Renee. Cutaways show Renee and Dick watching the video, aroused. Back in the desert, the pale man shoots Dick dead and whispers something inaudible to Fred before vanishing, leaving Fred with the pistol.

When police investigate Andy's death, Alice is absent from the photograph Pete found. Fred drives to his home, buzzes the intercom, and says, "Dick Laurent is dead." As the detectives arrive, Fred flees and leads police on a frantic chase through the desert. He screams helplessly amid flashes of light as the scene dissolves to a darkened highway.

== Cast ==
- Bill Pullman as Fred Madison
- Patricia Arquette as Renee Madison / Alice Wakefield
- Balthazar Getty as Pete Dayton
- Robert Blake as The Mystery Man
- Robert Loggia as Mr. Eddy / Dick Laurent
- Natasha Gregson Wagner as Sheila
- Richard Pryor as Arnie
- Lisa Boyle as Marian
- Mink Stole as Forewoman
- Michael Massee as Andy
- Jack Nance as Phil
- Jack Kehler as Guard Johnny Mack
- Henry Rollins as Guard Henry
- Gene Ross as Warden Clements
- Giovanni Ribisi as Steve 'V'
- Gene Alfred Garrett (credited as Al Garrett) as Carl
- Scott Coffey as Teddy
- Gary Busey as Bill Dayton
- John Roselius as Al
- Lou Eppolito as Ed
- Jennifer Syme as Junkie Girl
- Marilyn Manson as Porn Actor
- Twiggy Ramirez as Porn Actor
- Michael Shamus Wiles as Guard Mike

== Style and influences ==
The film's screenplay refers to it as a "21st-Century Noir Horror".

Although Lost Highway is generally classified as a surrealist neo-noir horror film, the film borrows elements from other genres, including German Expressionism and the French New Wave. The term psychological thriller has also been used to describe its narrative elements. Thomas Caldwell of Metro Magazine described Fred Madison as "a typical film noir hero, inhabiting a doomed and desolate world characterised by an excess of sexuality, darkness and violence". Another film noir feature of the film is the femme fatale of Alice Wakefield, who misleads Pete Dayton into dangerous situations. The film was also noted for its graphic violence and sexual themes, which Lynch defended by stating that he was simply being honest with his own ideas for the film.

Some of the film's elements reference earlier works: the film Detour (1945) also focuses on a disturbed nightclub musician. The film's setting and mysterious recorded messages were seen as a reference to the film Kiss Me Deadly (1955), while its nightmarish atmosphere has been compared to Maya Deren's short film Meshes of the Afternoon (1943). Like Alfred Hitchcock's film Vertigo (1958), the film examines male obsessions with women who merely represent emotions that relate to them. Sean Murphy of PopMatters considers the film a possible homage to Ambrose Bierce's short story "An Occurrence at Owl Creek Bridge" (1890), in which much of the main narrative is imagined by the protagonist as he is executed.

== Interpretations ==
The film's circular narrative has been likened to a Möbius strip. Lynch described it as a "psychogenic fugue" and insisted that, while the film is about "identity", it is abstract and is left to the audience to interpret. However, in a 1997 interview with Time Out, Lynch seemingly let slip his own interpretation of the story; when asked whether Pullman's character is "trapped in [a] time loop, doomed to repeat his murders and mistakes forever and ever", Lynch replied, "Well, maybe not forever and ever, but you can see how it would be a struggle. Yeah, that's it." He agreed to a comparison with the Buddhist conception of saṃsāra, elaborating that "it's a fragment of the story [...] it's not so much a circle as like a spiral that comes around, the next loop a little bit higher than the one that precedes it".

Co-writer Barry Gifford, in contrast, endorsed a rational explanation for the film's surreal events. According to him, Fred is experiencing a literal psychogenic fugue, a mental break which is manifested when he transforms into Pete. Arquette described her own interpretation: "To me, it's sort of a movie about looking at women through the eyes of a misogynist... so he's totally obsessed with her, can't love her enough, can't have her to himself enough, can't kill her enough times." She later elaborated, "He hates women, he doesn't quite trust [Renee], even though she is his wife. He kills her but can't remember it, then he recreates himself as this virile young man and meets her again. And now, she actually wants to fuck him and she is in love with him. But even in this version, she is a dirty whore. In this man's mind, a woman is always the monster. No matter what."

Jeremiah Kipp of Slant Magazine called the film "an embodiment of a pensive male anxiety" and ascribed its mixed reception to the fact that "for some cultural reason it's easier for audiences to accept female hysteria than the insecurities of men". Kipp noted that most critics interpreted the film as concerning the "distortion and reshaping of memory". Philosopher and critic Slavoj Žižek considered the narrative's circularity as analogous to a psychoanalytic process: "There is a symptomatic key phrase ['Dick Laurent is dead'] (as in all of Lynch's films) that always returns as an insistent, traumatic, and indecipherable message (the Real), and there is a temporal loop, as with analysis, where the protagonist at first fails to encounter the self, but in the end is able to pronounce the symptom consciously as his own." He also interprets the film's bipartite structure as exploiting "the opposition of two horrors: the phantasmatic horror of the nightmarish noir universe of perverse sex, betrayal, and murder, and the (perhaps much more unsettling) despair of our drab, alienated daily life of impotence and distrust".

== Production ==
=== Development ===
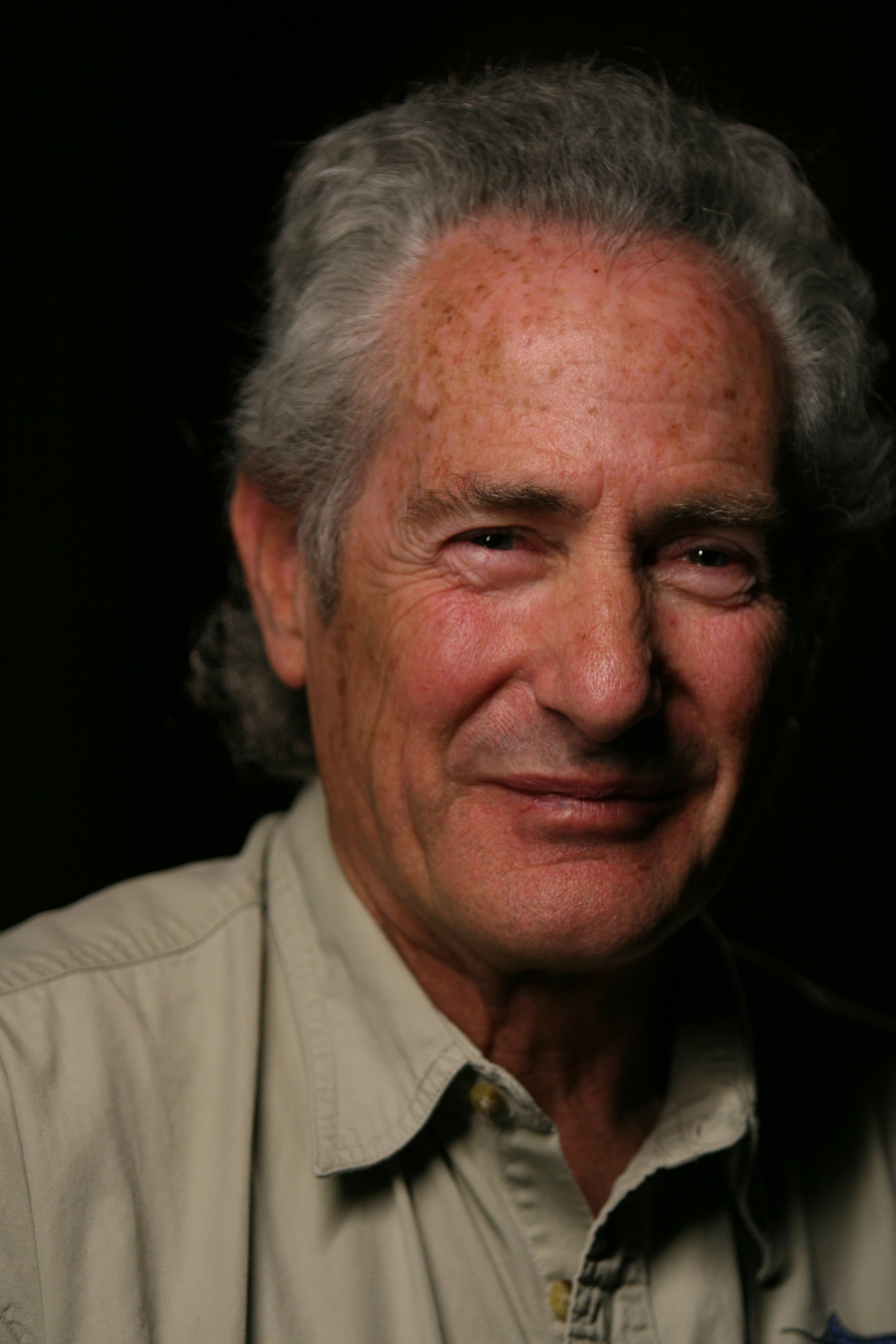
Author Barry Gifford co-wrote the screenplay with Lynch.

Lost Highway was directed by David Lynch as his first feature film since Twin Peaks: Fire Walk with Me (1992), a prequel to his television series Twin Peaks (1990–1991; 2017). He came across the phrase "lost highway" in the book Night People (1992) by Barry Gifford. As Lynch knew Gifford well and had previously adapted his novel Wild at Heart (1990) into a film of the same name, he told Gifford that he loved the phrase as a title for a film, and the two agreed to write a screenplay together. Each initially had their own ideas of what Lost Highway should be, but ended up rejecting all of them. Lynch then told Gifford that, during the last night of shooting Fire Walk with Me, he had a thought about videotapes and a couple in crisis. This idea would develop into the first part of the film until Fred is put on death row. Lynch and Gifford then realized that a transformation had to occur and another story, which would have several links to the first one while differing from it, developed. It took them one month to finish the script.

Lost Highway was partially inspired by the murder trial of O. J. Simpson and Simpson's ability to return to his normal life afterward. The scene where Fred hears the words "Dick Laurent is dead" over his intercom was inspired by a similar incident that happened to Lynch at his own house, which he ended up using as a shooting location for the film. Unlike the sinister nature of the scene in the film, Lynch assumed the stranger who left a message on his intercom had simply mistaken his house for that of actor David Lander, who lived next door. Lynch said the idea of the Mystery Man "came out of a feeling of a man who, whether real or not, gave the impression that he was supernatural". The film was financed by the French production company Ciby 2000 and Lynch's own Asymmetrical Productions.

=== Casting ===
Lynch cast his friend and neighbor Bill Pullman as Fred. Patricia Arquette agreed to take the dual role of Renee and Alice because she was interested in portraying a sexually desirable and dangerous woman, which she had never done before. She had also been a fan of Lynch for a long time and felt honored to work with him. Balthazar Getty was cast after Lynch saw a picture of him in a magazine and said he was "the guy for the job". As the script was open to interpretation, Getty and Arquette did not know what kind of film Lost Highway was supposed to be, with Getty saying that "part of David's technique is to keep his actors guessing, because it creates a certain atmosphere on set".

Robert Blake was cast as The Mystery Man because Lynch liked his previous work and had long been interested in working with him. Blake did not understand the script at all, but was responsible for the look and style of his character, for which Lynch told him to use his imagination; Blake cut his hair short, parted it in the middle, shaved his eyebrows off, applied white kabuki make-up on his face, and put on a black outfit. He then approached Lynch, who loved it. Robert Loggia, who had previously expressed interest in portraying Frank Booth in Lynch's Blue Velvet, was cast in the dual role of Mr. Eddy and Dick. Mr. Eddy's road rage scene was inspired by an incident in which Loggia, upon learning that he had lost the role in Blue Velvet to Dennis Hopper, launched a profanity-laden rant at Lynch. Lost Highway also features the final film roles of Blake, Jack Nance, and comedian Richard Pryor. Dennis Woodruff claimed that he was cast in a small speaking role as a prison inmate but was cut from the film.

=== Filming ===
Filming took place largely in Los Angeles. It began on November 29, 1995, and finished on February 22, 1996. Some of the film's exterior and driving scenes were shot in Griffith Park, while the scenes of the Lost Highway Hotel were filmed at the Amargosa Opera House and Hotel in Death Valley. Scenes set in Fred and Renee's mansion were filmed at Lynch's own home in the Hollywood Hills. The house was configured in a particular way to meet the requirements of the film. A corridor that leads to the bedroom was added, and the façade was remodeled with slot windows to make Fred's point of view very limited. The paintings on the wall above the couch were made by Mary Sweeney, who produced and edited much of Lynch's work (including Lost Highway) and was briefly married to him.

Scenes involving sex and nudity proved difficult for Arquette, who considered herself modest and shy; she later said she felt protected by Lynch and the film crew, who were ready to give her a bathrobe at any time. The sex scene between her and Getty in the desert, which was shot on a dry lake bed 20 miles outside Baker, California, was a closed set with only key crew members allowed. The sequence where Fred transforms into Pete was not CGI, but rather accomplished with in-camera techniques: a make-up expert constructed a fake head that was covered with artificial brain matter, which was then intercut with shots of Pullman. The final car chase was shot with two different cameras running at different frame rates. The footage was then sped up to make the scene more aggressive.

Lynch worked with cinematographer Peter Deming to give the film a surreal look. Because the script did not include many descriptions, the film's visual approach evolved as shooting progressed. Deming would occasionally pull out the lenses of his camera to defocus a particular scene, while Lynch would often listen to music in his headset and to a scene at the same time to visualize the screenplay. According to him, "Sound and picture working together is what films are [...] so every single sound has to be supporting that scene and enlarging it. A room is, say, nine by twelve [feet], but when you're introducing sound to it, you can create a space that's giant." The notion of a psychogenic fugue was incorporated into the film after the unit publicist read about it in a book on mental illnesses. Lynch felt it was a musical term, stating that "a fugue starts off one way, takes up on another direction, and then comes back to the original, so it [relates] to the form of the film".

Lynch originally wanted to shoot Lost Highway in black and white, but the idea was discarded due to the financial risks it could cause. The film was instead shot in varying levels of darkness, featuring few daylight scenes. Some sequences became so dark that it was difficult for viewers to see what was happening. According to Deming, "The thing I wanted to achieve was giving the feeling that anything could come out of the background, and to leave a certain question about what you're looking at. The film is working under the surface while you're watching it."

=== Editing ===
The film's darkness levels were intentionally left alone during post-production. The first cut of the film ran for 180 minutes, and a test audience of 50 people was given a preview to allow Lynch an idea of what needed to be cut. The film was ultimately cut down to 130 minutes. Most of the deleted scenes were about Pete's life, including scenes where he visited a drive-in and a bowling alley with his friends.

=== Soundtrack ===
The film's original score was composed by frequent Lynch collaborator Angelo Badalamenti, with additional music by Barry Adamson. Although most of the score was recorded in Prague, additional compositions were done in London. In New Orleans, Lynch collaborated with Nine Inch Nails frontman Trent Reznor to provide additional music, which eventually accompanied the scenes in which Fred and Renee watch the mysterious VHS tapes. The Nine Inch Nails songs "The Perfect Drug" and "Driver Down" were specifically composed for the film. Reznor then produced a soundtrack album that includes the film's score and songs by artists such as David Bowie, Lou Reed, Marilyn Manson, The Smashing Pumpkins, and Rammstein. Additionally, This Mortal Coil's recording of "Song to the Siren" appears in the film but is not included on the soundtrack.

Marilyn Manson's contributions include a cover of Screamin' Jay Hawkins' "I Put a Spell on You", which was previously released on the EP Smells Like Children (1995), and "Apple of Sodom", which was specifically written for the film. Smashing Pumpkins frontman Billy Corgan wrote the song "Eye" for the film after Lynch rejected an early version of the song "Tear" from the band's album Adore (1998). The Rammstein songs "Rammstein" and "Heirate Mich" were included after Lynch listened to their album Herzeleid (1995) while exploring locations for the film. The track "Insensatez", an instrumental version of the bossa nova song "How Insensitive" by Antônio Carlos Jobim, was also included as part of the film's soundtrack. The album was released on November 26, 1996, reaching No. 7 on the Billboard 200 chart and being certified Gold in the U.S. and Platinum in Canada.

== Release ==
=== Box office ===
Lost Highway was released in France on January 15, 1997. The film received its North American premiere in January 1997 at the Sundance Film Festival. It was then given a limited release in 12 theaters on February 21, 1997, grossing nearly $213,000 at the U.S. box office weekend. The film expanded a week later in 212 theaters and, after a modest three-week run, went on to make $3.7 million in North America. Lost Highway was released in Russia on May 19, 2017, two decades after its initial release, and grossed $28,347. Overall, the film grossed nearly $3.8 million worldwide.

=== Home media ===
Lost Highway was released on DVD on March 25, 2008, by Universal Studios Home Entertainment. The DVD is presented in anamorphic widescreen in the 2.35:1 ratio with Dolby Digital 5.1 audio. The film was then released on Blu-ray format in France in 2010, and in Japan and the United Kingdom in 2012. The British edition includes a collection of short, experimental films that Lynch had previously sold on his website. However, it was encoded in 1080i resolution at a 50 Hz frame rate, as opposed to the 1080p resolution at 24 frames per second of the French and Japanese editions. In the United States, Lost Highway was released on Blu-ray on June 25, 2019, by Kino Lorber using the 2008 Universal master. Lynch did not participate in the release, saying, "It was made from old elements and not from a restoration of the original negative. I hope that a version from the restoration of the original negative will happen as soon as possible." Kino Lorber responded the release was sourced from the Universal Pictures master, and that they had intended to work with Lynch on the release but had "sent email after email without one response". The Criterion Collection released a 4K Blu-ray with a restoration supervised and approved by Lynch on October 11, 2022.

== Critical reception ==
=== Contemporaneous reviews ===
Lost Highway initially polarized critics. Gene Siskel and Roger Ebert gave the film "two thumbs down", which Lynch would later tout as "two more great reasons to see" the film. Ebert argued that Lynch effectively puts images on the screen and uses a strong soundtrack to create mood, but that the film "does not make sense" and that it is "about design, not cinema". Similarly, Kenneth Turan of the Los Angeles Times wrote that Lost Highway is a "beautifully made but emotionally empty" film that "exists only for the sensation of its provocative moments". Both Stephanie Zacharek of Salon and Owen Gleiberman of Entertainment Weekly felt that the film was superficial, especially when compared to Blue Velvet. Zacharek felt that Lynch had "traded some of his disturbing originality for noir formula and schticky weirdness".

The New York Times journalist Janet Maslin felt that, while the film's perversity resembled that of Blue Velvet, it still "holds sinister interest of its own" and "invites its audience to ponder". Metro editor Richard von Busack praised Lost Highway as a "true horror" film. He explained that horror "ought to transcend logic and ordinary reality" and, unlike with popular horror films like Scream (1996), where the difference between screen violence and real violence is obvious, Lynch "present[s] horror as horror, willing to baffle us, willing to wound us". In another positive review, Andy Klein of the Dallas Observer felt that Lost Highway was Lynch’s best work since Blue Velvet. Klein compared the film's unanswerable concerns to the "Star Gate" sequence from 2001: A Space Odyssey (1968), stating that Lost Highway is "better absorbed and experienced than analyzed".

Writing for the Chicago Reader, critic Jonathan Rosenbaum felt that Lost Highway was "an audacious move away from conventional narrative and back toward the formal beauty of Eraserhead". He credited Lynch's "masterful and often powerful fusions of sound and image" for giving the film a very expressionist style. However, he criticized the noir iconography for its lack of historical context. For example, he explained that, while Arquette's clothes fit in a noir setting, The Mystery Man's video camera is very contemporary and feels out of place. Todd McCarthy of Variety concluded that, although Lost Highway is "uneven and too deliberately obscure in meaning to be entirely satisfying", the result "remains sufficiently intriguing and startling to bring many of Lynch's old fans back on board".

At the 1997 Stinkers Bad Movie Awards, Lost Highway was nominated for Worst Picture and Worst Director, but lost to Batman & Robin in both categories. In 1998, it was nominated for the Belgian Film Critics Association's Grand Prix, but lost to Lone Star.

=== Legacy ===
Lost Highway has retrospectively attracted both critical praise and scholarly interest. On review aggregator Rotten Tomatoes, 70% of 63 critics gave the film a positive review. The website's critical consensus reads, "Marking a further escalation in David Lynch's surrealist style, Lost Highway is a foreboding mystery that arguably leads to a dead end, although it is signposted throughout with some of the director's most haunting images yet." On Metacritic, the film holds a score of 53 out of 100 based on 21 reviews. Lost Highway was ranked at No. 323 on the 2012 Sight & Sound critics' poll of The Greatest Films of All Time.

As a cult film, Lost Highway was included in The A.V. Club's "The New Cult Canon" section. Editor Scott Tobias viewed it as "more cohesive than it might appear at first blush" and argued that Lynch "goes digging for truths that people don't know or won't acknowledge about themselves—within dreams, within the subconscious, within those impossibly dark hallways where we fear to tread". Lucia Bozzola of the AllMovie online database claimed that Lost Highway retrospectively remains "a sound/image tour de force". Jeremiah Kipp of Slant Magazine claimed that the film was not an artistic failure but rather "in many ways, it's Lynch at his most daring, emotional, and personal" and described it as "a fitting companion piece to, and inversion of, Mulholland Drive". Writing for Little White Lies, William Carroll also connected the film to Mulholland Drive due to "Los Angeles' iconic topography", and felt that it deserved to be regarded as one of Lynch's best works. Daily Vanguard editor Victoria Castellanos remarked that the film "serves as a wonderful companion to Mulholland Drive and Inland Empire, and in many ways is more surreal and emotional than some of Lynch's other films".

Lynch's filmography inspired the Silent Hill video game series, with Lost Highway specifically serving as an inspiration for Silent Hill 2 (2001).

== Adaptation ==
In 2003, the film was adapted as an opera by the Austrian composer Olga Neuwirth, with a libretto by Elfriede Jelinek.
