= Scott Coffey =

American actor, director, producer and screenwriter

- Born: Thomas Scott Coffey; May 1, 1964 (age 62); Honolulu, Hawaii, U.S.
- Other names: T. Scott Coffee; T. Scott Coffey
- Occupations: Actor; director; producer; screenwriter
- Years active: 1983–present
- Partner: Blair Mastbaum

Scott Coffey (born Thomas Scott Coffey; May 1, 1964) is an American actor, director, producer and screenwriter. His film credits include Ferris Bueller's Day Off (1986), Shag (1988), Wayne's World 2 (1993), and Mulholland Drive (2001). He directed the films Ellie Parker (2005), Adult World (2013), and It Takes Three (2021).

Coffey was nominated for the Independent Spirit Award for Best Supporting Male for his performance in Shag.

== Biography ==
=== Personal life ===
Coffey was born and raised in Honolulu, Hawaii, where he began his acting career appearing in school plays, community theatre and with the Hawaii Performing Arts Company. He also appeared in several episodic television shows. He later became a writer and director. Coffey lives in New York with his longtime boyfriend, novelist Blair Mastbaum.

=== Career ===
At sixteen, he moved to Rome, attending high school and acting in films including Once Upon a Time in America. Coffey's favorite film was Bertolucci's La Luna which sparked his desire to move to Italy. Later, he moved to New York where he signed with the William Morris Agency and studied acting while co-starring in the off-Broadway play It's All Talk.

After a year he moved to Los Angeles to pursue his film career, appearing in Ferris Bueller's Day Off and SpaceCamp. His television work included a special The Twilight Zone episode entitled "Private Channel", as well as an episode of Amazing Stories directed by Robert Zemeckis. In 1988, Coffey played the major role of Chip in Shag.

His first feature film, Ellie Parker (2005), which finished production in July 2005, was an Official Selection of the 2005 Sundance Film Festival and won the New American Cinema Special Jury Prize at the Seattle International Film Festival. He wrote All God's Children Can Dance, a film adaptation of a story by Haruki Murakami. Coffey also directed the 2013 indie Adult World.

Coffey formed a friendship with actress Naomi Watts when the two worked together in the 1995 film Tank Girl. Coffey directed Watts in the 2001 short film Ellie Parker, which was later expanded into the feature film of the same name. The two have also appeared in other works together, mostly directed by David Lynch, including the 2001 mystery feature Mulholland Drive and the web series Rabbits.

== Filmography ==
Film
Year	Film	Role	Notes
1984	Il peccato di Lola	Albert	Remake of Private lessons
1986	SpaceCamp	Gardener	Credited as T. Scott Coffey
1986	Ferris Bueller's Day Off	Adams	Credited as T. Scott Coffey
1987	Some Kind of Wonderful	Ray	
1987	Zombie High	Felner	Alternative title: The School That Ate My Brain
1988	Satisfaction	Nickie	Alternative title: Girls of Summer
1988	Shag	Chip Guillyard	Alternative title: Shag: The Movie
1989	The Big Picture	Waiter	Credited as T. Scott Coffey
1990	Wild at Heart	Billy	Scenes deleted
1991	Shout	Bradley	
1993	Cigarettes & Coffee		
1993	The Temp	Lance	
1993	Wayne's World 2	Heavy Metaller	
1994	Dream Lover	Billy	
1995	Breaking Free	Blitz	Alternative title: A Leap of Faith
1995	Tank Girl	Donner	
1996	Rolling Thunder	Lewis	
1997	Lost Highway	Teddy	
1997	The Disappearance of Kevin Johnson	Video Engineer	
2001	Never Date an Actress	The caring boyfriend	
2001	Mulholland Drive	Wilkins	
2002	Rabbits	Jack	
2005	Ellie Parker	Chris	Also writer, director, and producer
2006	Inland Empire	Jack Rabbit	Voice
2007	Normal Adolescent Behavior	Philosophy Teacher	Alternative title: Havoc 2: Normal Adolescent Behavior
2007	All God's Children Can Dance	—N/a	Writer
2013	Adult World	Bookstore owner	Also director
Television
Year	Title	Role	Notes
1985	Christopher Columbus	Vallejo	Miniseries
1986	Hotel	Martin	1 episode
1986	Highway to Heaven	Tim Brent	1 episode
1986	Amazing Stories	Peter Brand	1 episode
1987	MacGyver	Michael Thornton	1 episode
1987	The Twilight Zone	Keith Barnes	Episode: "Private Channel"
1988	Paradise	Dick Bradley	1 episode
1990	Montana	Willie	Television film
1990	The Outsiders	Randy Anderson	2 episodes
1993	seaQuest DSV	Bobby	1 episode
1995	JAG	Corporal David Parr	1 episode
1996	Nowhere Man	Gary Greer, recruit No. 5	1 episode
1998	Route 9	Nate	Television film
2017	Twin Peaks	Trick	1 episode

== Directorial work ==
Films
Year	Film
2005	Ellie Parker
2013	Adult World
2021	It Takes Three

Music videos
Year	Song	Artist	Album
2011	"What About Us"	Handsome Furs	Sound Kapital
2010	"Yulia"	Wolf Parade	Expo 86
2009	"I'm Confused"	Handsome Furs	FACE CONTROL
2009	"Circa"	Death Vessel	Nothing is Precious Enough For Us
2008	"Move You"	Anya Marina	Slow and Steady Seduction

== Awards and nominations ==
Year	Award	Result	Category	Film or series
1990	Independent Spirit Award	Nominated	Best Supporting Male	Shag
2005	Seattle International Film Festival	Won	New American Cinema Special Jury Prize	Ellie Parker
2005	Sundance Film Festival	Nominated	Grand Jury Prize (Dramatic)	Ellie Parker
