= In Heaven =

Song composed by Peter Ivers and David Lynch and performed by Peter Ivers

Song by Peter Ivers

from the album Eraserhead: Original Soundtrack
- Language: English
- Released: 1982
- Length: 1:38
- Label: I.R.S; Alternative Tentacles
- Composer: Peter Ivers
- Lyricist: David Lynch
- Producers: David Lynch; Alan R. Splet

"In Heaven (Lady in the Radiator Song)" (often referred to as simply "In Heaven") is a song performed by Laurel Near, composed by Peter Ivers, with lyrics by David Lynch. The song is featured in Lynch's 1977 film Eraserhead, and was subsequently released on its 1982 soundtrack album.

== Personnel ==
- Laurel Near - vocals
- Fats Waller - pipe organ
- Peter Ivers - writer
- David Lynch - writer

== Cover versions ==
- The song's co-writer, Peter Ivers, recorded a version in the late 1970s, though it was not released until its inclusion on the 2019 album Becoming Peter Ivers.
- Devo (sung by Booji Boy) covered the song live in 1978–1979 as the penultimate song in their set.
- It was sung at the start of gigs by fans of psychobilly band The Meteors. A recording of this features on the start of their debut 1981 album The Case of the Meteors in Heaven.
- A cover by Tuxedomoon with Winston Tong was released in 1980 on the multiband live album Can You Hear Me? Music From The Deaf Club, and later rereleased on their 1987 album Pinheads on the Move. A different live version was also released on their 1989 Ten Years in One Night live album.
- Elements from the end of a Cardiacs song called "A Time For Rejoicing" at the end of their 1981 independent album Toy World specifically reference this song.
- Frankie Goes To Hollywood uses the song as part of their original version of Relax, which was called "Relax (In Heaven Everything Is Fine)", on The Tube, February 18, 1983.
- Bauhaus covered the song on their regular set for their final UK tour in the summer of 1983 and was featured on the Rest in Peace: The Final Concert album. The band's former bassist, David J, later performed "In Heaven" live as a duet with Pixies singer Black Francis at a solo show at the Los Angeles Echoplex in December 2009.
- It was covered by the Pixies in 1987 for their initial demo tape and was later released in 2002 on the Pixies EP. The band re-recorded the track for a session for John Peel's BBC radio show in May 1988, which was later released on the Pixies at the BBC album. The song was a regular part of the Pixies' setlist, and a live version by the band appeared as a B-side of the "Gigantic" single, and was also included on The Complete B-Sides album.
- Adamski covered the song (titled Everything is Fine) on his 1990 album, Doctor Adamski's Musical Pharmacy.
- A cover of the song appeared on the 1993 Miranda Sex Garden album Suspiria.
- Icelandic band Bang Gang included a version of the song on their 1998 debut album You.
- Ben Golomstock of Miranda Sex Garden's Stories from the Moon included a version of the song on their 2006 self-titled album, sung by Katiejane Garside of Daisy Chainsaw, Queenadreena and Ruby Throat.
- American band Modest Mouse covered the song as part of their song "Workin’ on Leavin’ the Livin’", which is on their 1999 compilation album Building Nothing Out of Something.
- American composer and producer Keith Kenniff covered the song on his 2007 album Ayres, under his Helios moniker.
- Metaform covered the song on his 2008 album Standing on the Shoulders of Giants under the title "Heaven Can Wait".
- Zola Jesus covered the song, retitled "Lady in the Radiator", as part of the David Lynch Foundation's "The Music of David Lynch" concert on April 1, 2015
- Sematary and Ghost Mountain interpolated the song in their 2019 track "Bunny Suit".
- Jazz guitarist Julian Lage gave the song an instrumental treatment on his 2019 record, Love Hurts.
- Sadistik sampled "In Heaven" in his song "In Heaven" from his 2015 album "Phantom Limbs"
- In 2019, indie pop band AJR sampled "In Heaven" in their song "Birthday Party" from their album Neotheater. The lines used were: "In Heaven, everything is fine. In Heaven, everything is fine. You've got your good things, and I've got mine."
- The song is sampled by death metal band Venom Prison at the end of their song Life Suffer from their 2020 album Primeval.
- In November 2021, the Russian performer OM used this sample in his track "Кожура" (Peel) of the album BACKGROUND.
- Swiss Jazz trumpeter Erik Truffaz covered the song on his 2023 album Clap!, with vocals by Bertrand Belin.
- A reunited Pantera used the original soundtrack version of the song prior to taking the stage at their 2023 concerts. While this could be viewed as an homage to the deceased Abbott brothers (Dimebag Darrell & Vinnie Paul), they used it as part of their intro as far back as 1994.
- At the Pellissier Building and Wiltern Theatre in Los Angeles during a Mike Dean show, The Weeknd came out and performed a cover of this song on 1 March 2024. The Weeknd has also played the cover during his concert in São Paulo, as well as the Melbourne concert during the After Hours til Dawn Tour, where it was widely believed this cover would be on his next studio album, Hurry Up Tomorrow.
- Russian band Мы included a sample of this song in their song "Восток и Запад" (East and West).
- American rapper and producer Kanye West sampled the song for A$AP Rocky on the unreleased track "Ladi Radi".
- Scottish singer and guitarist Davy Henderson covered the song with his band Win in 1985, which appeared as the b-side to Win's second single "You've Got The Power".
- Princess Chelsea covered the song on her 2022 album Everything Is Going to Be Alright.
- Fontaines D.C. covered the song on their deluxe edition of the album Romance, mixing it with their own song "Starburster".
- Apartment 26 covered the song (titled Heaven) on their 2004 album, Music for the Massive.
- The song is sampled by yatshigang & Kordhell in the song HEAVEN from Kordhell's January 2024 HEAVEN single; the song HEAVEN was also included on yatashigang's SAD SATAN album.
- For their Eraserhead Xiu Xiu cover album Xiu Xiu released "In Heaven" as a single on 19 March, 2026
