= Keren Ann (album) =

Studio album by Keren Ann
- Released: 23 April 2007
- Length: 43:24
- Labels: Delabel; EMI
- Producer: Keren Ann

Keren Ann chronology
Nolita (2004)	Keren Ann (2007)	101 (2011)

Keren Ann is the fifth studio album by French musician Keren Ann, and her third English-language album. The album was released on 23 April 2007 in France by Delabel and EMI. It was released on 8 May 2007 in the United States by Blue Note Records.

== Critical reception ==
Professional ratings
Review scores
Source	Rating
AllMusic	4.5/5 stars
Christgau's Consumer Guide	(1-star Honorable Mention)
Entertainment Weekly	A−
The Guardian	4/5 stars
The Irish Times	4/5 stars
Pitchfork	6.4/10
PopMatters	9/10
Rolling Stone	3/5 stars
Spin	3/5 stars

In his review for MSN Music, music critic Robert Christgau cited "Lay Your Head Down" and "It Ain't No Crime" as highlights and quipped that it was "music to pretend you're having sophisticated casual sex to, only remember -- you're not actually that sophisticated". Other reviews were more positive; NPR called the album "gorgeous."

== Track listing ==
All tracks are written by Keren Ann Zeidel, except where noted.

No.	Title	Writer(s)	Length
1.	"It's All a Lie"		5:40
2.	"Lay Your Head Down"		4:46
3.	"In Your Back"		5:36
4.	"The Harder Ships of the World"		4:08
5.	"It Ain't No Crime"		4:17
6.	"Where No Endings End"		3:37
7.	"Liberty"		6:00
8.	"Between the Flatland and the Caspian Sea"		5:28
9.	"Caspia"	Zeidel; Barði Jóhannsson	3:52

Limited edition bonus tracks
No.	Title	Writer(s)	Length
1.	"Silent Night"	Franz Xaver Gruber; Joseph Mohr	3:18
2.	"Manhã de Carnaval"	Luiz Bonfá; Antônio Maria	1:59
3.	"Hallelujah"	Leonard Cohen	4:22
4.	"Tennessee Waltz"	Pee Wee King; Redd Stewart	2:28

== Charts ==
Chart (2007)	Peak position
Belgian Albums (Ultratop Wallonia)	40
French Albums (SNEP)	13
Swiss Albums (Schweizer Hitparade)	81
UK Albums (Official Charts)	189
US Top Jazz Albums (Billboard)	18
