= Ronnie Rocket =

Unfinished David Lynch film project

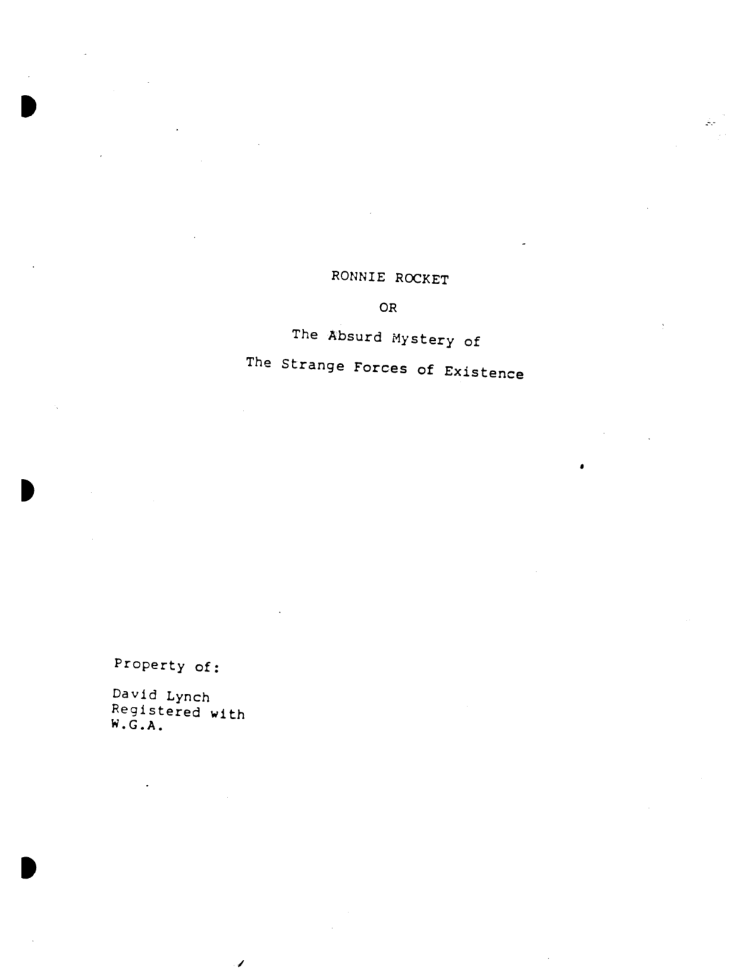
- Screenplay cover sheet
- Directed by: David Lynch
- Written by: David Lynch
- Starring: Dexter Fletcher; Michael J. Anderson (Both attached at different times)
- Country: United States
- Language: English

Ronnie Rocket (originally spelled Ronny Rocket) is an unfinished film project written by David Lynch, who also intended to direct it. Begun after the success of his 1977 film Eraserhead, Lynch shelved Ronnie Rocket due to an inability to find financial backing for the project. Instead, he sought out an existing script on which to base his next film, settling on what would become 1980's The Elephant Man. Lynch returned to Ronnie Rocket throughout the 1980s but by the following decade had stopped considering it to be a viable prospect.

Ronnie Rocket, also subtitled The Absurd Mystery of the Strange Forces of Existence, was to feature elements which have since come to be seen as Lynch's hallmarks, including industrial art direction, 1950s popular culture and physical deformity. The script featured a three-foot tall man with an affinity for and control over electricity. Lynch first met Michael J. Anderson when tentatively casting for this role and later worked with him in Twin Peaks and Mulholland Drive.

Upon Lynch's death in January 2025, the project remains in development hell and its fate still left uncertain.

== Overview ==
Ronnie Rocket concerns the story of a detective seeking to enter a mysterious second dimension, aided by his ability to stand on one leg. He is being obstructed on this quest by a strange landscape of odd rooms and a mysterious train, while being stalked by the "Donut Men", who wield electricity as a weapon. Besides the detective's story, the film was to show the tale of Ronald d'Arte, a teenage dwarf, who suffers a surgical mishap, which leaves him dependent on being plugged into a mains electricity supply at regular intervals; this dependence grants him an affinity with and control of electricity which he can use to produce music or cause destruction. The boy names himself Ronnie Rocket and becomes a rock star, befriending a tap dancer named Electra-Cute.

The film, subtitled The Absurd Mystery of the Strange Forces of Existence, was to make use of several themes that have since become recurring elements in David Lynch's works—a write-up for The A.V. Club described the script's contents as "idealized 1950s culture, industrial design, midgets, [and] physical deformity." Writing for LA Weekly, John Dentino suggested that the screenplay "reads like the source work for all [Lynch's] films, as well as Twin Peaks." The film was to have featured two separate but connected worlds, another hallmark of Lynch's writings. The film's art direction would have featured a heavily industrial backdrop; Greg Olson described the action as taking place against an "oil slick, smokestack, steel-steam-soot, fire-sparks and electrical arcs realm," similar to the direction ultimately taken in the depiction of Victorian England in The Elephant Man and the planet Giedi Prime in Dune. Although Lynch shot his first two feature-length films in black-and-white, he intended to film Ronnie Rocket in color, inspired by the works of French film-maker Jacques Tati. Lynch planned to experiment for some time to find the right balance and application of color for the film.

== Background ==
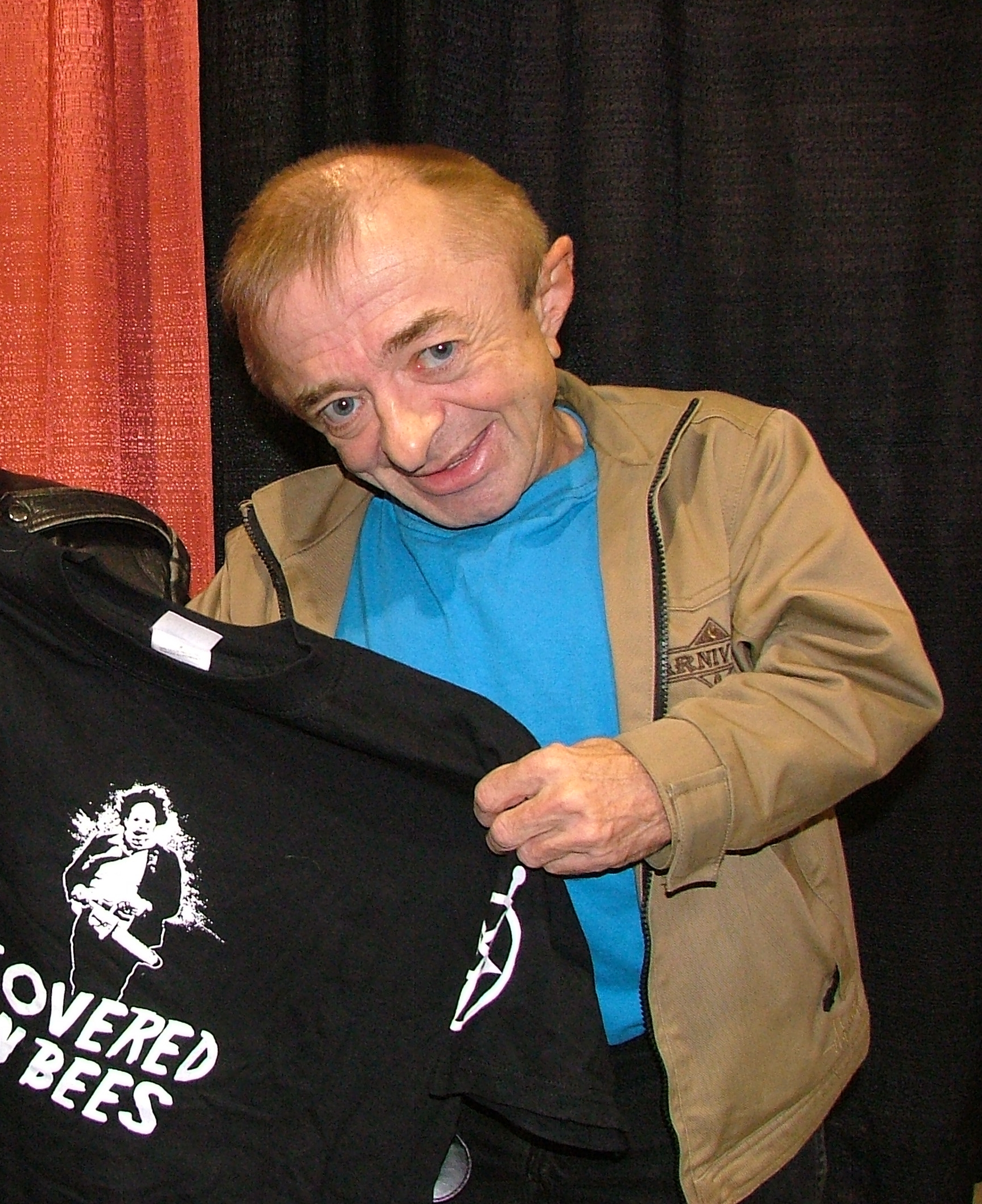
Michael J. Anderson (pictured in 2006) was considered for the title role, which led to his involvement in Twin Peaks.

After releasing 1977's Eraserhead, a black-and-white surrealist film and his debut feature-length production, Lynch began work on the screenplay for Ronnie Rocket. He and his agent, Marty Michaelson, of William Morris Endeavor, initially attempted to find financial backing for the project. They met with one film studio on the matter. Lynch described the film as being "about electricity and a three-foot guy with red hair"; the studio never got back in touch with him.

Lynch met film producer Stuart Cornfeld at this time. Cornfeld had enjoyed Eraserhead and was interested in producing Ronnie Rocket. He was working for Mel Brooks and Brooksfilms, and when the pair realized Ronnie Rocket was unlikely to find sufficient financing to be produced, Lynch asked to see some already-written scripts to work from for his next film instead. Cornfeld found four scripts he felt would interest Lynch, but on hearing the name of the first of these, the director decided his next project would be The Elephant Man.

[Lynch] used to talk with my late husband and I, any chance he could get, about Ronnie during breaks of shooting The Elephant Man. Ronnie Rocket was the subject that was near and dear to his heart. [...] Ronnie scripts have gone through all sorts of permutations over the years. I suspect that Ronnie Rocket is David's most thought-about story and may just never be made not because [Ciby 2000] didn't want to shoot it, they and several others were willing, but David wasn't.

— Ann Kroeber, wife of sound designer Alan Splet

Lynch would return to Ronnie Rocket after each of his films, intending it, at different stages, as the follow-up not only to Eraserhead or The Elephant Man but also Dune, Blue Velvet and Twin Peaks: Fire Walk With Me. After producing The Elephant Man, Lynch had planned to cast Dexter Fletcher in the title role. Brad Dourif, Dennis Hopper, Jack Nance, Isabella Rossellini, Harry Dean Stanton, Dean Stockwell, and Crispin Glover have also been considered for roles in the film at various times; each has worked with Lynch on other projects.

In 1987, after having released Blue Velvet, Lynch again attempted to pursue Ronnie Rocket. While scouting actors for the eponymous role, Lynch met Michael J. Anderson, whose work in short films Lynch had seen previously. As a direct result of meeting Anderson, Lynch cast the actor in a recurring role in the television series Twin Peaks; his first appearance was in 1990's "Episode 2". Anderson also appeared in Lynch's 1990 short film Industrial Symphony No. 1, and the 2001 film Mulholland Drive. Lynch visited northern England to scout a filming location for Ronnie Rocket, but found that the industrial cities he had hoped to use had become too modernized to fit his intended vision.

American singer-songwriter Dave Alvin, who had been recording musical contributions to Twin Peaks among other projects for Lynch, recalled working with Lynch on the music for Ronnie Rocket and wrote that "his storyline involved (and I ain't joking) a dwarf blues guitar player in early 1950s Chicago who is also an extraterrestrial from outer space." Lynch did three recording sessions with Alvin where he would describe a series of abstract images to Alvin then ask him to create some sonic landscapes to enhance the images. According to Alvin, at one point Lynch directed him to "imagine an old conveyor belt full of liquid metal. The conveyor belt with the liquid metal then travels into these gigantic, antiquated, rusty machines where this liquid metal experiences some sort of loud, transmogrifying process inside the machines that turns the liquid metal into beautiful sparks of wild electricity. And please make it sound like Muddy Waters but also don't make it sound like Muddy Waters." Working with drummer Stephen Hodges and bassist Don Falzone, Alvin said they "came up with something that sounded like a cross between Muddy Waters, Bitches Brew-era Miles Davis and The Cramps. Mr. Lynch loved it."

The project has suffered setbacks because of the bankruptcy of several potential backers. Both Dino De Laurentiis' De Laurentiis Entertainment Group and Francis Ford Coppola's American Zoetrope were attached to the project at different times, but went bankrupt before work could begin. Lynch had stayed at Coppola's home in Napa County, California, while Coppola and Sting read the script several times; however, the failure of 1982's One from the Heart forced American Zoetrope to file for bankruptcy.

== Legacy ==
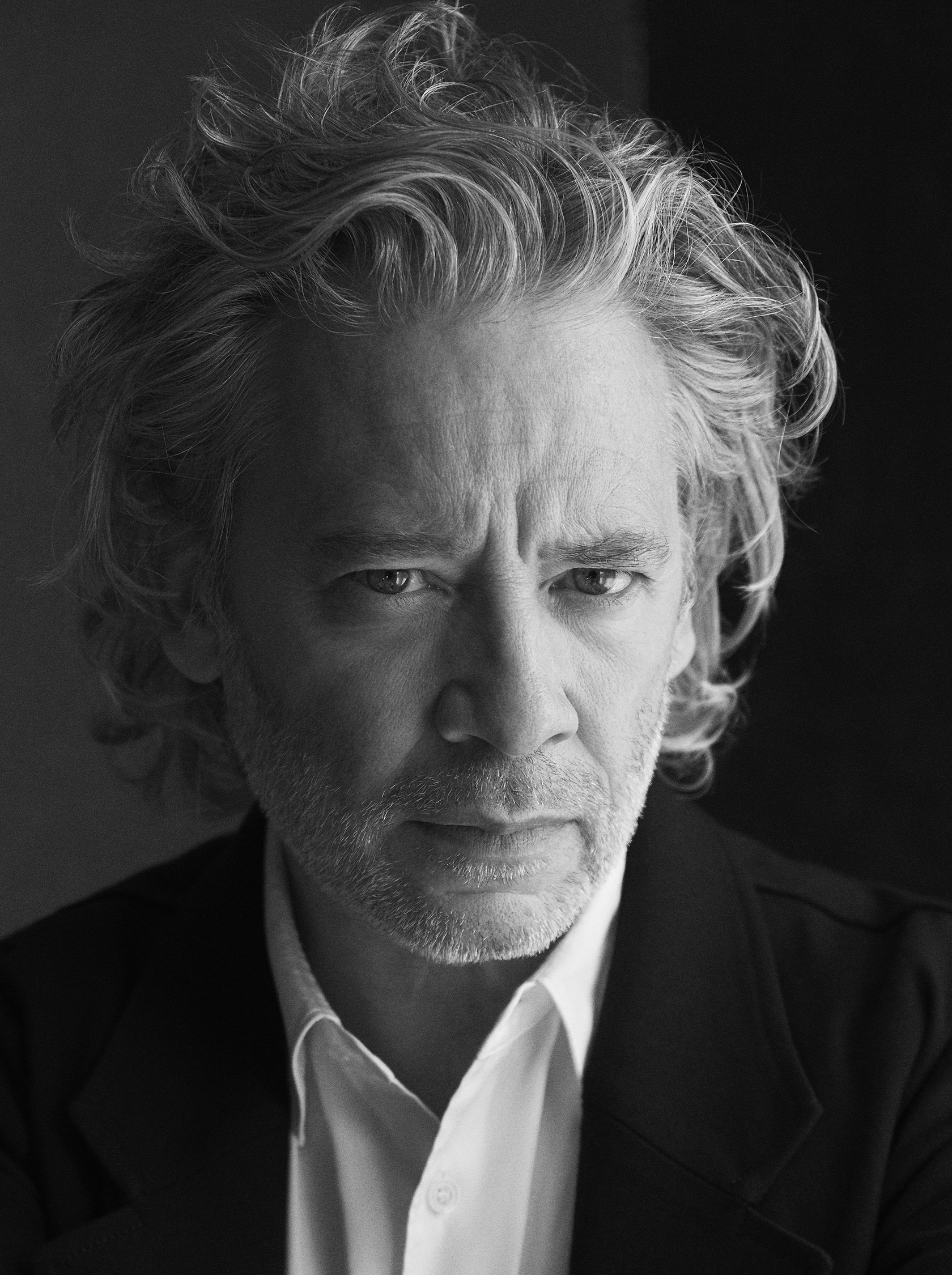
Dexter Fletcher (pictured in 2014) considered Ronnie Rocket too abstruse for potential financiers.

Having been temporarily unable to begin production on the film for some time because De Laurentiis owned the rights, Lynch stopped actively pursuing Ronnie Rocket as a viable project in the early 1990s upon rejection from Ciby 2000, as a part of a three-picture deal. Though he claimed to have gotten interest from other investors who "have so much money that they don't really care, necessarily, about making a profit." The director had expressed interest in producing the film in the same manner as Eraserhead, using a small crew, building the sets himself, and living on them during the film's production. He also claimed he would revisit the film after reaching a stage in his career "when I don't really care what happens, except that the film is finished." However, he had never abandoned it officially before his death in 2025, frequently referring to it in interviews as "hibernating." The most recent known draft of the script is dated 2012. In a June 2013 interview with BOMB, Lynch expressed the view that the passage of time—and the decline of "smokestack industry"—was making it more difficult to envisage the film, saying:

It was still really alive in the '50s and '60s, but this industry is going away [...] And then a thing happened. This thing called graffiti. Graffiti to me is one of the worst things that has happened to the world. It completely ruined the mood of places. Graffiti kills the possibility to go back in time and have the buildings be as they were. Cheap storm windows and graffiti have ruined the world for Ronnie Rocket.

However, the following year, Lynch said what had kept him from making the film was that he never got "the big idea" for it, elaborating that "something is still somewhat missing in the script."

The Guardian's Danny Leigh has compared the script's reputation among film fans to those of Sergei Eisenstein's unproduced adaptation of An American Tragedy and Michael Powell's unmade adaptation of The Tempest. Leigh recalled having read a photocopied version of the script in the early 1990s, and felt that it "might have aged far better than Wild at Heart." In an article for The Daily Telegraph, Simon Braund described the film as "an ambitious and difficult project," considering it potentially Lynch's strangest film. Braund believed that the difficulty in finding funding could be attributed to the film's abstract ideas and its unconventional title character. In 2004, filmmaker Jonathan Caouette expressed interest in reviving the project, though he stated that Lynch will "do it someday."

Speaking of the difficulty in attracting financing for the film, Dexter Fletcher said "I should imagine that the big money heads at whatever studio it was couldn't get their brains round it at all. It's fine for the artist to read and enjoy, but for accountants it was probably a very different proposition. But that's David Lynch all over in a lot of ways." Themes present in the screenplay were revisited in Lynch's subsequent work; LA Weekly's John Dentino surmised that "it's almost as if, in the face of timid or broke producers and studios, [Lynch has] been forced to pillage his own seminal work for the key obsessions that will animate his cinema".

== Footnotes ==
=== References ===
- Barney, Richard A. (2009). David Lynch: Interviews. University Press of Mississippi. ISBN 978-1604732368.
- Hughes, David (2001). The Greatest Sci-Fi Movies Never Made. Titan Books. ISBN 1840233257.
- Odell, Colin; Le Blanc, Michelle (2007). David Lynch. Kamera Books. ISBN 978-1-84243-225-9.
- Olson, Greg (2008). Beautiful Dark (illustrated ed.). Scarecrow Press. ISBN 978-0-8108-5917-3.
- Rodley, Chris; Lynch, David (2005). Lynch on Lynch (2nd ed.). Macmillan. ISBN 0-571-22018-5.
- Woods, Paul, ed. (2000). Weirdsville USA: The Obsessive Universe of David Lynch. Plexus Publishing. ISBN 978-0-85965-291-9.
