= Nolita (album) =

Studio album by Keren Ann
- Released: 21 December 2004
- Studios: Studio Philipsen (Paris); EMI Publishing Studio (Paris); Yellow Tangerine (New York)
- Genre: Indie pop
- Label: EMI
- Producer: Keren Ann

Keren Ann chronology
Not Going Anywhere (2003)	Nolita (2004)	Keren Ann (2007)

Nolita is the fourth studio album by French musician Keren Ann. The album was released on 21 December 2004 in France and on 15 March 2005 in the United States. It is her second English-language album, containing tracks sung both in English and in French.

== Critical reception ==
Professional ratings
Review scores
Source	Rating
AllMusic	4/5 stars
The New Zealand Herald	4/5 stars
Pitchfork	8.2/10
PopMatters	6/10
Rolling Stone	3.5/5 stars
The Village Voice	B

In a positive review, AllMusic's Thom Jurek said that both the lyrics and instrumentation have substance and called Nolita "utterly beguiling ... assured, statuesque, and fully realized." In a negative review for The Village Voice, Robert Christgau panned Keren Ann for celebrating melancholy and for lacking rhythm: "[T]he languor she encourages in her quiet cult is the kind of privilege that feels like an accomplishment to Nick Drake and Sylvia Plath fans."

== Track listing ==
All tracks are written by Keren Ann Zeidel, except where noted.

French edition
No.	Title	Writer(s)	Length
1.	"Que n'ai-je?"		3:29
2.	"L'Onde amère"	Zeidel; Guy Chambers	2:57
3.	"Chelsea Burns"		4:11
4.	"Midi dans le salon de la duchesse"	Zeidel; Laurent Lescarret	2:51
5.	"Nolita"		7:12
6.	"Roses and Hips"		3:32
7.	"One Day Without"		3:52
8.	"La Forme et le Fond"		5:32
9.	"For You and I"	Zeidel; Barði Jóhannsson	3:45
10.	"Song of Alice"		3:56
11.	"Greatest You Can Find" (hidden track)		4:37

United States edition
No.	Title	Writer(s)	Length
1.	"Que n'ai-je?"		3:29
2.	"Greatest You Can Find"		4:37
3.	"Chelsea Burns"		4:11
4.	"One Day Without"		3:52
5.	"La Forme et le Fond"		5:32
6.	"Nolita"		7:12
7.	"Roses and Hips"		3:32
8.	"Midi dans le salon de la duchesse"	Zeidel; Lescarret	2:51
9.	"L'Onde amère"	Zeidel; Chambers	2:57
10.	"For You and I"	Zeidel; Jóhannsson	3:45
11.	"Song of Alice"		3:56

== Charts ==
Chart (2004)	Peak position
Belgian Albums (Ultratop Wallonia)	67
French Albums (SNEP)	56
