= Not Going Anywhere =

Studio album by Keren Ann
- Released: 25 November 2003
- Length: 38:16
- Label: EMI
- Producer: Keren Ann; Benjamin Biolay; Barði Jóhannsson

Keren Ann chronology
La Disparition (2002)	Not Going Anywhere (2003)	Nolita (2004)

Professional ratings
Review scores
Source	Rating
AllMusic	4/5 stars
Entertainment Weekly	B+
Pitchfork	7.5/10

Not Going Anywhere is the third studio album by French musician Keren Ann, and her debut English album. The album was released on 25 November 2003 in France and on 24 August 2004 in the United States. It contains four English versions of songs from her previous album La Disparition.

== Track listing ==
All tracks are written by Keren Ann Zeidel, except where noted.

No.	Title	Writer(s)	Length
1.	"Not Going Anywhere"		3:37
2.	"Polly"		3:16
3.	"Road Bin"	Zeidel; Benjamin Biolay	3:22
4.	"End of May"	Zeidel; Biolay	3:31
5.	"Sailor & Widow"		3:33
6.	"Sit in the Sun"		3:33
7.	"Right Now & Right Here"	Zeidel; Biolay	3:35
8.	"Seventeen"	Zeidel; Biolay	2:24
9.	"Spanish Song Bird"	Zeidel; Biolay	4:12
10.	"By the Cathedral"		2:41
11.	"Ending Song"	Zeidel; Barði Jóhannsson	4:32

== Charts ==
Chart (2003)	Peak position
Belgian Albums (Ultratop Wallonia)	37
French Albums (SNEP)	40
