= You (Bang Gang album) =

Studio album by Bang Gang
- Released: 1998
- Genre: Trip hop, electronic, downtempo
- Label: Sproti Records; East West
- Producer: Barði Jóhannson

Bang Gang chronology
| You (1998) | Something Wrong (2003) |

You is the first album released by the pop/electro band Bang Gang. It was written by Barði Jóhannson and released in 1998.

== Track listing ==
All songs by Barði Jóhannson except "In Heaven".

1. "Sacred Things"
2. "Hazing Out"
3. "So Alone"
4. "Liar"
5. "Sleep"
6. "Falling Apart"
7. "Save Me"
8. "Never Ever"
9. "Another You"
10. "Hard Life, Simple Song"
11. "In Heaven"

== Musicians ==
- Barði Jóhannson - guitar, vocals
- Esther Talia Casey - vocals
