= Haxan (disambiguation) =

Häxan is a 1922 Swedish-Danish horror film.

Haxan may also refer to:

- Häxan (album), a 2006 soundtrack album to the 1922 eponymous film
- Haxan Films, an American film production company
- Häxan, a 2010 song by Trentemøller from the album Into the Great Wide Yonder
- Häxan, a 2016 album by Dungen
- The Haxans, a music project founded by Piggy D.

== See also ==
- Hexen (disambiguation)
