= Häxan (album) =

Soundtrack album by Barði Jóhannsson
- Released: 2006
- Genre: Orchestra
- Length: 61:33
- Labels: Bang ehf. Discograph
- Producers: Barði Jóhannsson, Thorir Baldursson

Barði Jóhannsson chronology
Strákarnir okkar (with Mínus) (2005)	Häxan (2006)

Häxan is a soundtrack to the 1922 Swedish/Danish silent horror film of the same name composed by Barði Jóhannsson.

It also is the first album he released under his own name (he had before released three studio albums and a few singles with his bands Bang Gang and Lady and Bird). It was performed by the Bulgarian Symphony Orchestra, produced by Barði Jóhannson and Thorir Baldursson, and released in 2006.

== Track listing ==
All tracks are written by Barði Jóhannson, except "Haxan II" (Barði Jóhannson, Phoebe Tolmer).

No.	Title	Length
1.	"Haxan I"	9:17
2.	"Haxan II"	11:38
3.	"Haxan III"	8:48
4.	"Haxan IV"	8:14
5.	"Haxan V"	11:06
6.	"Haxan VI"	10:08
7.	"Haxan VII"	2:22

== Musicians ==
- Barði Jóhannsson - written and produced
- Bulgarian Symphony Orchestra
