= Ghosts from the Past =

Studio album by Bang Gang
- Released: 21 May 2008
- Genre: Pop, alternative, indie
- Label: Cod Music
- Producer: Barði Jóhannson

Bang Gang chronology
Something Wrong (2003)	Ghosts from the Past (2008)	The Wolves Are Whispering (2015)

Ghosts from the Past is the third studio album by the pop/electro band Bang Gang. It was released on 21 May 2008 (23 May in France). The album is the band's first record release through Cod Music.

== Material ==
According to Barði Jóhannson this is the heaviest album he has made. This is also his first album where he provides almost all of the vocals. Other vocalists on the album are Keren Ann and Anthony Gonzalez from M83.

== Singles ==
An extract of the single "I Know You Sleep" was released on Bang Gang's Myspace page.

- "I Know You Sleep" (2008)

== Track listing ==
All songs by Barði Jóhannson

1. "The World Is Gray"
2. "One More Trip"
3. "I Know You Sleep"
4. "Black Parade"
5. "Lost in Wonderland"
6. "Every Time I Look in Your Eyes"
7. "Ghosts from the Past"
8. "Forever Now"
9. "Don't Feel Ashamed"
10. "You Won't Get Out"
11. "Stay Home"

== Musicians ==
- Barði Jóhannson - guitar, vocals
- Keren Ann - vocals
- Anthony Gonzalez - vocals
