= Reykjavík-Rotterdam =

2008 Icelandic film by Óskar Jónasson

- Reykjavík-Rotterdam promotional poster
- Directed by: Óskar Jónasson
- Written by: Arnaldur Indriðason; Óskar Jónasson
- Produced by: Agnes Johansen; Baltasar Kormákur Dirk Rijneke Mildred van Leeuwaarden
- Starring: Baltasar Kormákur; Ingvar E. Sigurðsson; Lilja Nótt Þórarinsdóttir; Þröstur Leó Gunnarsson; Victor Löw; Ólafur Darri Ólafsson; Jörundur Ragnarsson
- Cinematography: Bergsteinn Björgúlfsson
- Edited by: Elísabet Ronaldsdóttir
- Music by: Barði Jóhannsson
- Production companies: Blueeyes Productions; Rotterdam Films
- Release date: October 3, 2008
- Running time: 88 minutes
- Country: Iceland
- Language: Icelandic

Reykjavík-Rotterdam is a 2008 Icelandic film directed by Óskar Jónasson and starring Baltasar Kormákur and Ingvar E. Sigurðsson. A Hollywood remake titled Contraband starring Mark Wahlberg was released in 2012.

== Plot synopsis ==
Kristofer is working as a security guard. He was fired from the freight ship on which he worked when he was caught smuggling alcohol. Faced with money problems, he is tempted to accept the help of his friend, Steingrimur, who manages to pull some strings to get his old job back aboard the MV Dettifoss. He decides to take his chances one last time on a tour to Rotterdam to bring alcohol back on the return journey to Iceland. While in Rotterdam, his brother-in-law Arnor steals the money intended for the alcohol purchase, and buys ecstasy with it. The alcohol sellers force Kristofer to take part in a violent art theft; he escapes in the confusion during a shootout with the police.

Meanwhile, back in Iceland, Kristofer's wife Iris is threatened by three men, who trash her flat and then her place of work. She accepts Steingrimur's offer to stay with him until Kristofer returns. Steingrimur, with whom she was once involved, tries to seduce her, and as she tries to escape, he knocks her unconscious and, thinking that he has killed her, attempts to dispose of her body.

The Dettifoss returns. Customs search the vessel, but no contraband is found. Arnor believes that Kristofer has thrown the ecstasy and the alcohol overboard and attempts to escape from the gangsters expecting the consignment. Kristofer has planted the ecstasy in the car of the captain of the Dettifoss, and sets up the gangsters to be intercepted at the captain's house. Iris survived Steingrimur's attack, and Kristofer locates her just as Steingrimur is attempting to bury her in concrete at the construction site he works at. Out at sea, Kristofer's friends locate the alcohol.

== Release ==
The film was released on 3 October 2008. It was broadcast (dubbed in German) on German television ARD on 1 January 2010.

== Reception ==
Reykjavík-Rotterdam was one of the biggest-budget Icelandic films of all-time, and features an all-star cast of Icelandic cinema. The film garnered a four-star rating from Morgunblaðið, and has a rating of 45% at Rottentomatoes.com.

The film won five Edda Awards, including best script, director, editing, sound, and music:

- Director of the year – Óskar Jónasson
- Screenplay of the year – Arnaldur Indriðason and Óskar Jónasson
- Editor of the year – Elísabet Rónaldsdóttir
- Sound design of the year – Kjartan Kjartansson and Ingvar Lundberg
- Achievement in music for film or television – Barði Jóhannsson

An Icelandic Film and Television Academy committee chose Reykjavík-Rotterdam to be Iceland's submission to the Academy of Motion Picture Arts and Sciences for the 82nd Academy Awards for Best Foreign Language Film, though it failed to receive an Oscar nomination.

Variety, after a 2010 screening at the Palm Springs International Film Festival called it a "straightforward product from much of the team behind Baltasar Kormákur's considerably more eccentric Jar City" and an "uncommonly commercial item with brawny action, strokes of humor and a besieged rooting interest (played effectively by Kormákur)."

== Hollywood remake ==
Working Title Films released a U.S. remake entitled Contraband starring and produced by Mark Wahlberg. The original film's lead actor, Baltasar Kormákur, directed the film.
