= Hexen =

Hexen may refer to:

- N-Ethylhexedrone, a stimulant drug
- Hexen: Beyond Heretic, a 1995 dark fantasy video game
  - Hexen II, a 1997 video game sequel
- Hexen (band)

== See also ==
- Haxan (disambiguation)
- (Z)-3-hexen-1-ol acetyltransferase
- 3,5,5-Trimethyl-2-cyclo-hexen-1-one
- cis-3-Hexen-1-ol
- cis-3-Hexenal
- Hexene
