= Eraserhead (soundtrack) =

Eraserhead: Original Soundtrack

Soundtrack album by various
- Released: June 15, 1982
- Recorded: 1927; 1976–1977
- Genres: Industrial; dark ambient
- Length: 37:47
- Label: I.R.S.
- Producers: David Lynch, Alan Splet

David Lynch soundtrack chronology
Eraserhead: Original Soundtrack (1982)	David Lynch's Mulholland Drive: Music from the Motion Picture (2001)

Professional ratings
Review scores
Source	Rating
AllMusic	4.5/5 stars
Pitchfork Media	8.8/10

Eraserhead: Original Soundtrack (sometimes referred to as Eraserhead: Original Soundtrack Recording or just Eraserhead) is a 1982 soundtrack album composed by David Lynch and Alan Splet as the soundtrack for Lynch's 1977 film Eraserhead. Sacred Bones Records remastered and reissued the album in 2012.

== Recording ==
The mood and tone of Eraserhead and its soundtrack were influenced by Philadelphia's post-industrial history. Lynch lived in the city while studying painting at the Pennsylvania Academy of Fine Arts, and was fascinated by its feeling of constant danger; describing it both as a "sick, twisted, violent, fear-ridden, decaying place" and "beautiful, if you see it the right way." Lynch and Splet used avant-garde approaches to recording on the soundtrack; including crafting almost every sound in the soundtrack from scratch using bizarre methods. The ambiance of the love scene in the movie, for example, was produced by recording air blown through a microphone as it sat inside a bottle floating in a bathtub. Lynch and Splet worked "9 hours a day for 63 days" to produce the soundtrack and all of the sound effects in the film. Splet recalls the sound effects Lynch called on him to produce for Eraserhead as "snapping, humming, buzzing, banging, like lightning, shrieking, squealing" over the five years it took to produce the film and its soundtrack. Splet had worked with Lynch since his short film The Grandmother. Also during the production of the soundtrack, Lynch drew two telephone wires for Splet, each line indicating between four and five pitches he wanted to be represented in the movie's music and sound effects. When Splet played Lynch Fats Waller-esque pipe organ numbers as soundtrack material, Lynch was immediately confident in the pipe-organ style, stating that he had "never listened to any other kind of music for (Eraserhead). I knew that was it."

== Release ==
The original soundtrack for Eraserhead was released via I.R.S. Records on LP in the United States on June 15, 1982, with 5 tracks. Side A consists of three songs written by Thomas "Fats" Waller and Side B consists of "In Heaven", the song performed by Laurel Near's character the Lady in the Radiator in the original film.

It was reissued in 2012 by Sacred Bones Records in the form of a deluxe LP box set with additional 7" and as a deluxe CD, including the previously unreleased track "Pete's Boogie".

== Track listing ==
=== Original 1982 I.R.S. LP ===
Side A – includes excerpts from:
No.	Title	Writer(s)	Length
1.	"Digah's Stomp"	Thomas "Fats" Waller
2.	"Lenox Avenue Blues"	Waller
3.	"Stompin' the Bug"	Mercedes Gilbert, Phil Worde
4.	"Messin' Around with the Blues"	Waller

Side B – includes:
No.	Title	Writer(s)	Length
1.	"In Heaven (Lady in the Radiator Song)"	David Lynch, Peter Ivers, Thomas "Fats" Waller

=== Absurda 2001 CD ===
No.	Title	Length
1.	"Side One"	20:09
2.	"Side Two"	18:29
3.	"Eraserhead Dance Mix"	10:16
Total length:		48:54

=== Sacred Bones 2012 deluxe reissue CD and LP ===
All music is composed by David Lynch and Alan Splet.

LP
No.	Title	Length
1.	"Side 1"	20:09
2.	"Side 2"	18:26
Total length:		38:35

7"
No.	Title	Writer(s)	Length
1.	"In Heaven (Lady in the Radiator Song)"	David Lynch, Peter Ivers	1:36
2.	"Pete's Boogie" (previously unreleased)		3:58
Total length:			5:34
