= Eraserhead =

1977 film by David Lynch

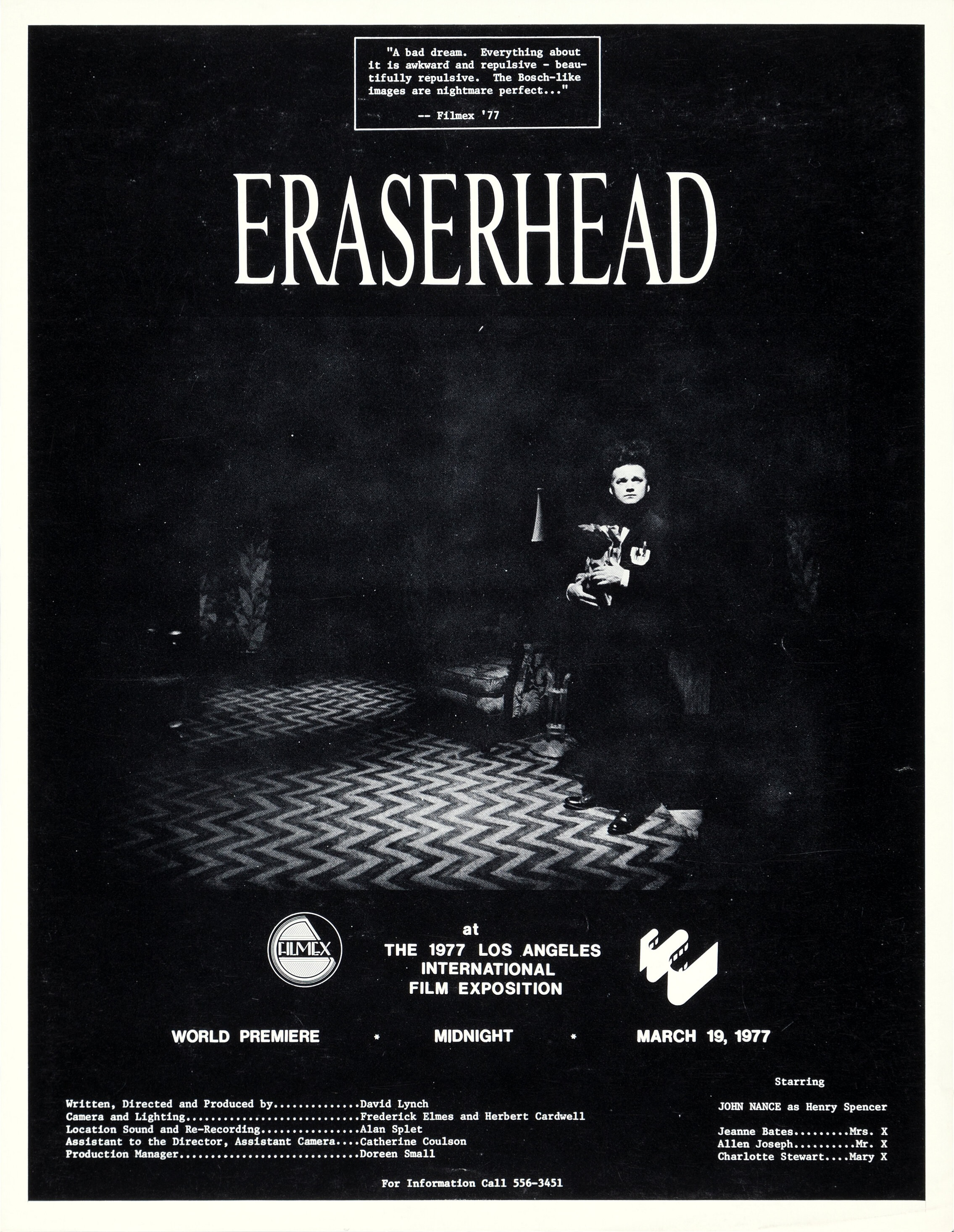
- Original Filmex screening poster
- Directed by: David Lynch
- Written by: David Lynch
- Produced by: David Lynch
- Starring: Jack Nance; Charlotte Stewart; Allen Joseph; Jeanne Bates; Judith Roberts
- Cinematography: Frederick Elmes; Herbert Cardwell
- Edited by: David Lynch
- Music by: David Lynch; Peter Ivers (Note: writer of “The Lady in the Radiator Song”); Fats Waller (Note: performer of pipe organ on “The Lady in the Radiator Song”)
- Production company: AFI Center for Advanced Studies
- Distributed by: Libra Films
- Release date: March 19, 1977 (Filmex)
- Running time: 89 minutes
- Country: United States
- Language: English
- Budget: $100,000
- Box office: $7.1 million

Eraserhead is a 1977 American horror film (Note: Eraserhead is primarily considered as a horror film, although defies other elements that is unusual from any traditional horror works including body horror, cosmic horror, dark fantasy, psychological horror, science fiction, and slow cinema.) written, directed, produced, and edited by David Lynch in his feature-length directorial debut. Lynch also created its score and sound design, which included pieces by a variety of other musicians. Shot in black and white and surrealist style, the independent film was Lynch's first feature-length effort following several short films. Starring Jack Nance, Charlotte Stewart, Jeanne Bates, Judith Anna Roberts, Laurel Near, and Jack Fisk, it tells the story of a man (Nance) who is left to care for his grossly deformed child in a desolate industrial landscape.

Eraserhead was produced with the assistance of the American Film Institute (AFI) during Lynch's time studying there. It nonetheless spent several years in principal photography because of funding difficulties; donations from Fisk and his wife Sissy Spacek as well as Nance's wife and crew member Catherine Coulson kept production afloat. It was shot on several locations owned by the AFI in California, including Greystone Mansion, and a set of disused stables in which Lynch lived. Lynch and sound designer Alan Splet spent a year working on the film's audio after their studio was soundproofed. The soundtrack features organ music by Fats Waller and includes the song "In Heaven", written and performed for the film by Peter Ivers, with lyrics by Lynch.

Initially opening to small audiences and little interest, Eraserhead gained popularity over several long runs as a midnight movie. Since its release, it has received widespread acclaim from critics and has been considered a cult film, a cornerstone of independent cinema and reinvigorated the midnight movie tradition. Its surrealist imagery and sexual undercurrents have been seen as key thematic elements, and its intricate sound design as its technical highlight. In 2004, the film was selected by the Library of Congress for preservation in the United States National Film Registry as being "culturally, historically, or aesthetically significant".

== Plot ==
Henry Spencer's face appears superimposed over a planet in space. He opens his mouth and a spermatozoon-like creature emerges. A man inside the planet moves a set of levers, and the creature is flushed away.

In an industrial cityscape, Henry walks home with his groceries. He is stopped outside his apartment by a woman across the hall, who informs him that his girlfriend, Mary, has invited him to dinner with her family. Henry leaves his groceries in his apartment, which is filled with piles of dirt and dead plants. That night, Henry visits Mary's home, conversing awkwardly with her mother. At the dinner table, he is asked to carve a Cornish game hen; the bird moves and writhes on the plate and gushes blood when cut. After dinner, Henry is cornered by Mary's mother, who tries to kiss him. She tells him that Mary has had his child and that the two must wed. This causes Henry to have a nose bleed. However, Mary is not sure if what she bore is a child.

The couple moves into Henry's one-room apartment and begins caring for the child, a swaddled bundle with an inhuman face that resembles the spermatozoon creature seen earlier. The infant refuses all food and cries incessantly and intolerably. The sound drives Mary hysterical, and she leaves Henry and the child. Henry attempts to care for the child, and he learns that it struggles to breathe and has developed painful sores on its skin.

Henry begins experiencing visions, again seeing the man in the planet, as well as a lady who inhabits his radiator and stomps more of the sperm creatures. After a sexual encounter with the girl across the hall, he has another vision in which the lady in the radiator sings ("In Heaven"), and his head pops off his body while he is fidgeting, replaced by the baby's crying head. Henry's disembodied head falls from the sky, landing on a street and breaking open. A boy finds it and takes it to a pencil factory to be turned into erasers.

Awakened, Henry seeks out the girl across the hall, but finds her with another man. Crushed, Henry returns to his room. He takes a pair of scissors and for the first time removes the child's swaddling clothes. It is revealed that the child has no skin; the bandages held its internal organs together, which proceed to spill out after the bandages are cut. The child gasps in pain, and Henry stabs its organs with the scissors. The wounds gush a thick liquid, covering the child. The power in the room overloads, causing the lights to flicker; as they flick on and off the child grows to huge proportions. As the lights burn out completely, the child's head is replaced by the planet seen at the beginning. Henry appears amidst a billowing cloud of eraser shavings. The side of the planet bursts apart and the man inside struggles with his levers, which emit sparks. Henry is embraced warmly by the lady in the radiator in a white void.

== Cast ==
- Jack Nance as Henry Spencer
- Charlotte Stewart as Mary X
- Allen Joseph as Mr. X
- Jeanne Bates as Mrs. X
- Jean Lange as Grandmother
- Judith Anna Roberts as Beautiful Girl Across the Hall
- Laurel Near as Lady in the Radiator
- Jack Fisk as The Man in the Planet

== Production ==
=== Pre-production ===
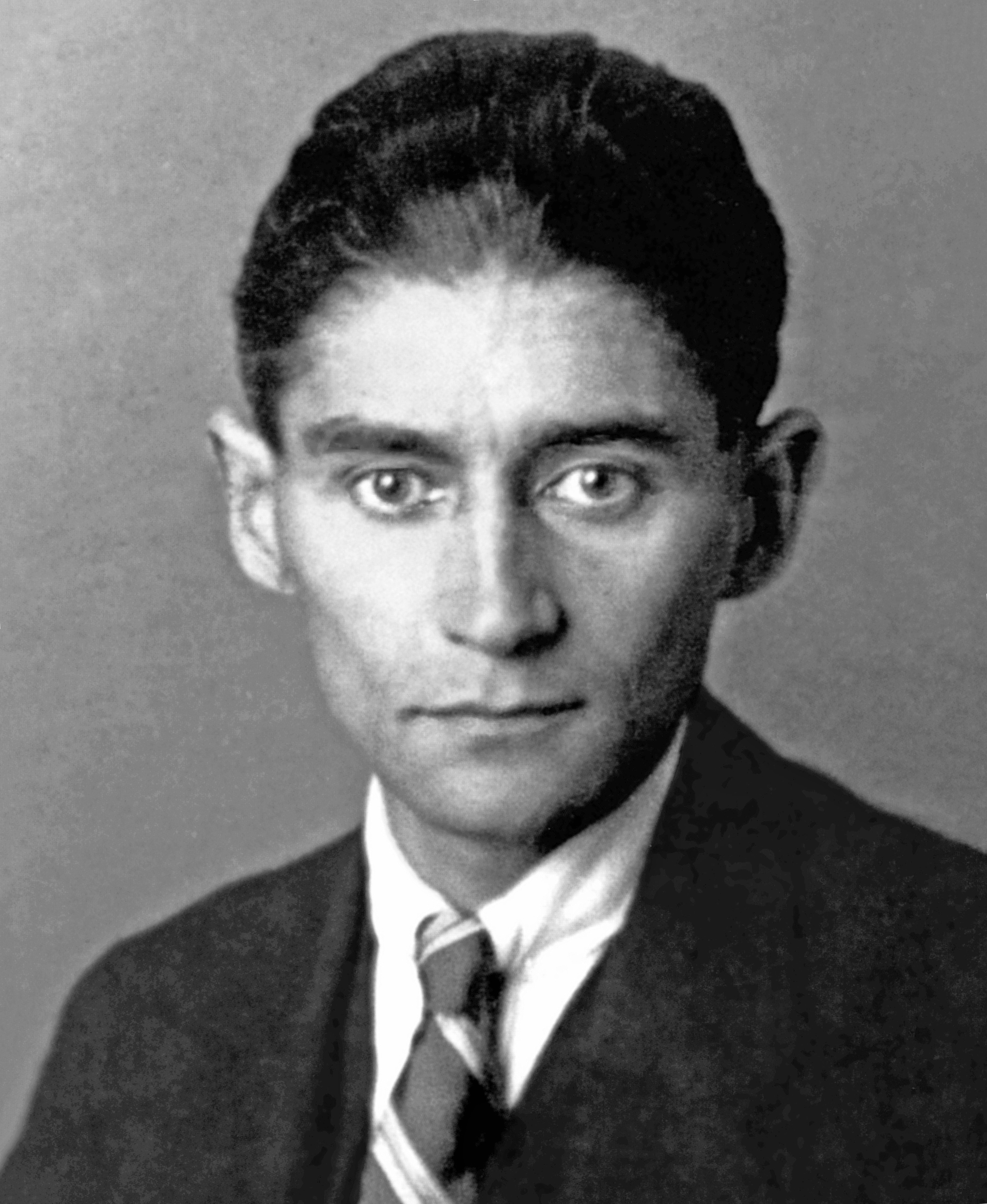
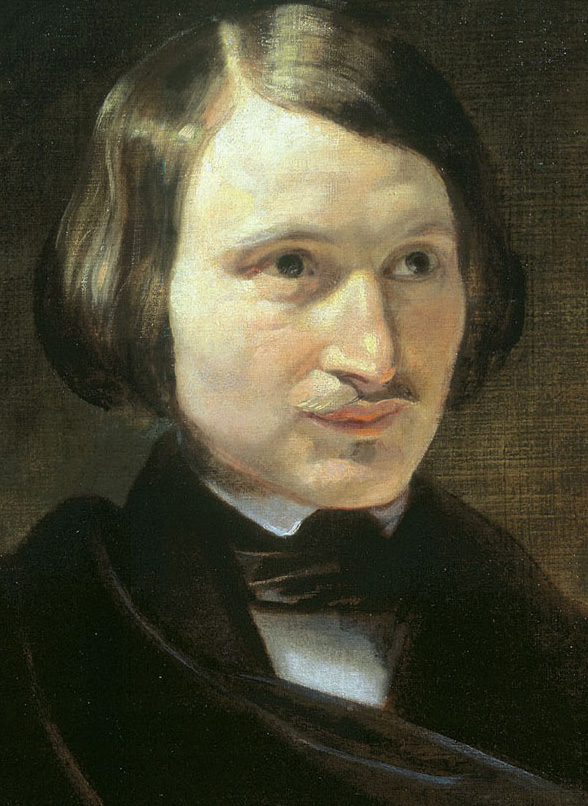
Stories by Franz Kafka (left) and Nikolai Gogol (right) influenced Eraserhead's script.

Writer and director David Lynch had previously studied for a career as a painter, and he had created several short films to animate his paintings. By 1970, however, he had switched his focus to film-making, and at the age of 24 he accepted a scholarship at the American Film Institute's Center for Advanced Film Studies. Lynch disliked the course and considered dropping out, but after being offered the chance to produce a script of his own devising, he changed his mind. He was given permission to use the school's entire campus for film sets; he converted the school's disused stables into a series of sets and lived there. In addition, Greystone Mansion, also owned by the AFI, was used for many scenes.

Lynch had initially begun work on a script titled Gardenback, based on his painting of a hunched figure with vegetation growing from its back. Gardenback was a surrealist script about adultery, which featured a continually growing insect representing one man's lust for his neighbor. The script would have resulted in a roughly 45-minute-long film, which the AFI felt was too long for such a figurative, nonlinear script. In its place, Lynch presented Eraserhead, which he had developed based on a daydream of a man's head being taken to a pencil factory by a small boy. Several board members at the AFI were still opposed to producing such a surrealist work, but they acquiesced when Dean Frank Daniel threatened to resign if it was vetoed. Lynch's script for Eraserhead was influenced by his reading as a film student; Franz Kafka's 1915 novella The Metamorphosis and Nikolai Gogol's 1836 short story "The Nose" were strong influences on the screenplay. Lynch also confirmed in an interview with Metro Silicon Valley that the film "came together" when he opened up a Bible, read one verse from it, and shut it; in retrospect, Lynch could not remember if the verse was from the Old Testament or the New Testament. In 2007, Lynch said "Believe it or not, Eraserhead is my most spiritual film." Lynch refused to elaborate on his statement when pressed.

The script is also thought to have been inspired by Lynch's fear of fatherhood; his daughter Jennifer had been born with "severely clubbed feet", requiring extensive corrective surgery as a child. Jennifer has said that her own unexpected conception and birth defects were the basis for the film's themes. The film's tone was also shaped by Lynch's time living in a troubled neighborhood in Philadelphia. Lynch and his family spent five years living in an atmosphere of "violence, hate and filth". The area was described as a "crime-ridden poverty zone", which inspired the urban backdrop of Eraserhead. Describing this period of his life, Lynch said, "I saw so many things in Philadelphia I couldn't believe ... I saw a grown woman grab her breasts and speak like a baby, complaining her nipples hurt. This kind of thing will set you back". In his book David Lynch: Beautiful Dark, film critic Greg Olson posits that this time contrasted starkly with Lynch's childhood in the Pacific Northwest, giving him a "bipolar, Heaven-and-Hell vision of America" which has subsequently shaped his films.

Initial casting for the film began in 1971, and Jack Nance was quickly selected for the lead role. However, the staff at the AFI had underestimated the project's scale—they had initially green-lit Eraserhead after viewing a twenty-one page screenplay, assuming that the film industry's usual ratio of one minute of film per scripted page would reduce the film to approximately twenty minutes. This misunderstanding, coupled with Lynch's own meticulous direction, caused the film to remain in production for a number of years. In an extreme example of this labored schedule, one scene in the film begins with Nance's character opening a door—a full year passed before he was filmed entering the room. Nance, however, was dedicated to producing the film and retained the unorthodox hairstyle his character sported for the entirety of its gestation.

=== Filming ===
Buoyed with regular donations from Lynch's childhood friend Jack Fisk and Fisk's wife Sissy Spacek, production continued for five years as Lynch kept running out of money. Additional funds were provided by Nance's wife Catherine E. Coulson, who worked as a waitress and donated her income, and by Lynch himself, who delivered newspapers throughout the film's principal photography. During one of the many lulls in filming, Lynch was able to produce the short film The Amputee, taking advantage of the AFI's wish to test new film stock before committing to bulk purchases. The short piece starred Coulson, who continued working with Lynch as a technician on Eraserhead. Eraserhead's production crew was very small, composed of Lynch; sound designer Alan Splet; cinematographer Herb Cardwell, who left the production for financial reasons and was replaced with Frederick Elmes; production manager and prop technician Doreen Small; and Coulson, who worked in a variety of roles.

It has been speculated that Lynch used a rabbit to create Spencer's alien-like baby.

The physical effects used to create the deformed child have been kept secret. The projectionist who worked on the film's dailies was blindfolded by Lynch to avoid revealing the prop's nature, and he refused to discuss the effects in subsequent interviews. The prop—which Nance nicknamed "Spike"—featured several working parts; its neck, eyes and mouth were capable of independent operation. Lynch has offered cryptic comments on the prop, at times stating that "it was born nearby" or "maybe it was found". It has been speculated by The Guardian's John Patterson that the prop may have been constructed from a skinned rabbit or a lamb fetus. The child has been seen as a precursor to elements of other Lynch films, such as John Merrick's make-up in 1980's The Elephant Man and the sandworms of 1984's Dune.

During production, Lynch began experimenting with a technique of recording dialogue that had been spoken phonetically backwards and reversing the resulting audio. Although the technique was not used in the film, Lynch returned to it for "Episode 2", the third episode of his 1990 television series Twin Peaks. Lynch also began his interest in transcendental meditation during the film's production, adopting a vegetarian diet and giving up smoking and alcohol.

=== Post-production ===
Lynch worked with Alan Splet to design the film's sound. The pair arranged and fabricated soundproof blanketing to insulate their studio, where they spent almost a year creating and editing the film's sound effects. The soundtrack is densely layered, including as many as fifteen different sounds played simultaneously using multiple reels. Sounds were created in a variety of ways—for a scene in which a bed slowly dissolves into a pool of liquid, Lynch and Splet inserted a microphone inside a plastic bottle, floated it in a bathtub, and recorded the sound of air blown through the bottle. After being recorded, sounds were further augmented by alterations to their pitch, reverb, and frequency.

After a poorly received test screening, in which Lynch believed he had mixed the soundtrack at too high a volume, the director cut twenty minutes of footage from the film, bringing its length to 89 minutes. Among the cut footage is a scene featuring Coulson as the infant's midwife, another of a couple of children—one of them Lynch's daughter Jennifer—digging for dimes in the dirt, one with a man torturing two women—once again played by Coulson—with a car battery, and one of Spencer toying with a dead cat.

=== Soundtrack ===
The soundtrack to Eraserhead was released by I.R.S. Records in 1982. The two tracks included on the album feature excerpts of organ music by Fats Waller and the song "In Heaven", written for the film by Peter Ivers. The soundtrack was re-released on August 7, 2012, by Sacred Bones Records in a limited pressing of 1,500 copies. The album has been seen as presaging the dark ambient music genre, and its presentation of background noise and non-musical cues has been described by Pitchfork's Mark Richardson as "a sound track (two words) in the literal sense".

== Themes and analysis ==
Eraserhead's sound design has been considered one of its defining elements. Although the film features several hallmark visuals—the deformed infant and the sprawling industrial setting—these are matched by their accompanying sounds, as the "incessant mewling" and "evocative aural landscape" are paired with these respectively. The film features several constant industrial sounds, providing low-level background noise in every scene. This fosters a "threatening" and "unnerving" atmosphere, which has been imitated in works such as David Fincher's 1995 thriller Seven and the Coen brothers' 1991 black comedy Barton Fink. The constant low-level noise has been perceived by James Wierzbicki in his book Music, Sound and Filmmakers: Sonic Style in Cinema as perhaps a product of Henry Spencer's imagination, and the soundtrack has been described as "ruthlessly negligent of the difference between dream and reality". The film also begins a trend within Lynch's work of relating diegetic music to dreams, as when the Lady in the Radiator sings "In Heaven" during Spencer's extended dream sequence. This is also present in "Episode 2" of Twin Peaks, in which diegetic music carries over from a character's dream to his waking thoughts; and in 1986's Blue Velvet, in which a similar focus is given to Roy Orbison's "In Dreams".

The film has also been noted for its strong sexual themes. Opening with an image of conception, the film then portrays Henry Spencer as a character who is terrified of, but fascinated by, sex. The recurring images of sperm-like creatures, including the child, are a constant presence during the film's sex scenes; the apparent "girl next door" appeal of the Lady in the Radiator is abandoned during her musical number as she begins to violently smash Spencer's sperm creatures and aggressively meets his gaze. In his book The Monster Show: A Cultural History of Horror, David J. Skal describes the film as "depict[ing] human reproduction as a desolate freak show, an occupation fit only for the damned". Skal also posits a different characterization of the Lady in the Radiator, casting her as "desperately eager for an unseen audience's approval". In his book David Lynch Decoded, Mark Allyn Stewart proposes that the Lady in the Radiator is in fact Spencer's subconscious, a manifestation of his own urge to kill his child, who embraces him after he does so, as if to reassure him that he has done right.

As a character, Spencer has been seen as an everyman figure, his blank expression and plain dress keeping him a simple archetype. Spencer displays a pacifistic and fatalistic inactivity throughout the film, simply allowing events to unfold around him without taking control. This passive behavior culminates in his sole act of instigation at the film's climax; his apparent act of infanticide is driven by the domineering and controlling influences that beset him. Spencer's passivity has also been seen by film critics Colin Odell and Michelle Le Blanc as a precursor to Lynch's 1983–92 comic strip The Angriest Dog in the World.

== Release ==
=== Theatrical release and box office ===
Trailer for the film's initial release

David Lynch, surrounded by five Woody Woodpecker dolls, in a 1982 trailer introducing Eraserhead at the Nuart Theatre

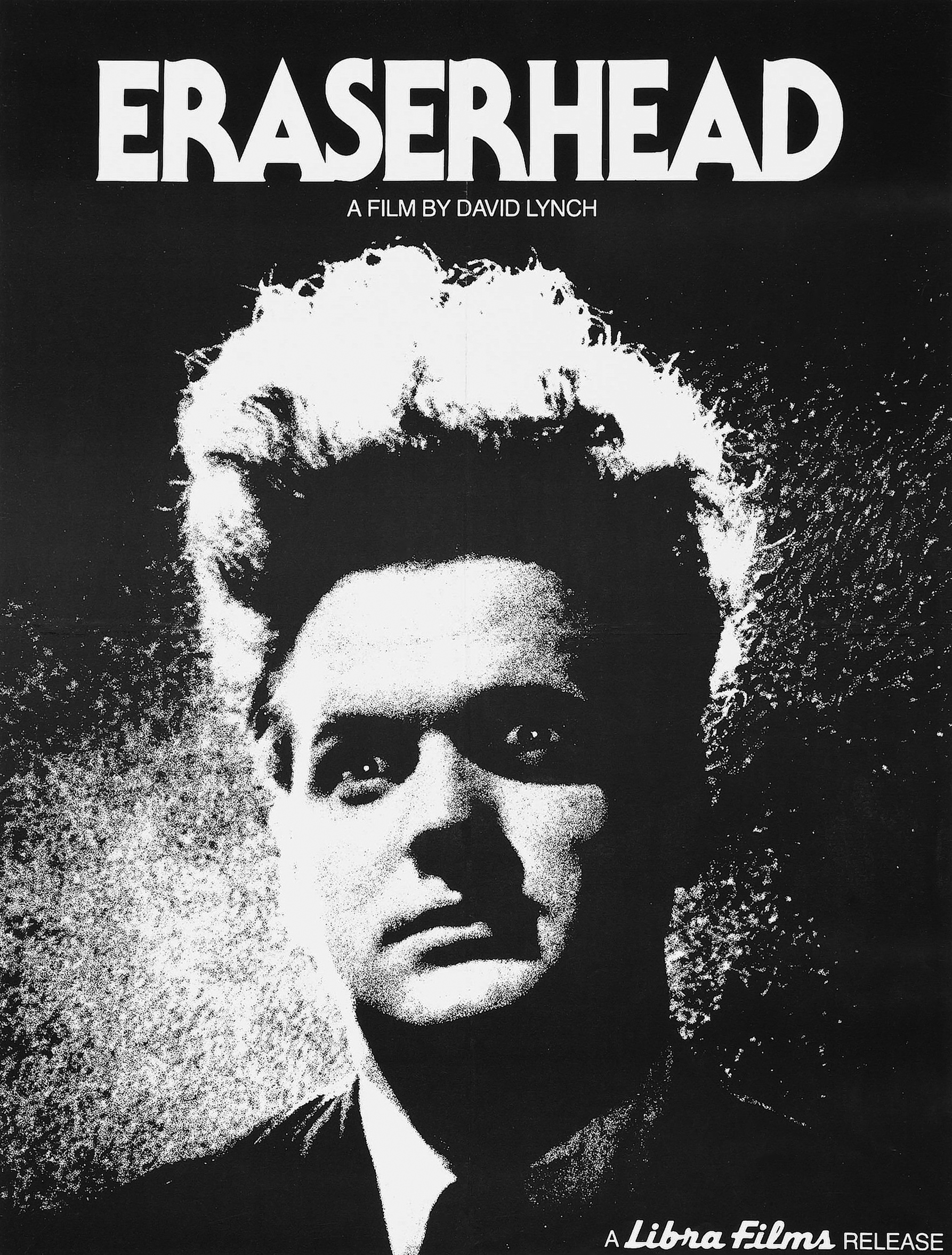
Film poster featuring a grainy close-up shot of Jack Nance's character.

Eraserhead premiered at the Filmex film festival in Los Angeles at a midnight screening on March 19, 1977. The original screening was preceded by the 1971 Belgian short film Scarabus by Gérald Frydman. On its opening night, 25 people attended; 24 viewed it the next evening. But Ben Barenholtz, head of distributor Libra Films, persuaded local theater Cinema Village to run the film as a midnight feature, where it continued for a year. After that, it ran for 99 weeks at New York's Waverly Cinema and had a year-long midnight run at San Francisco's Roxie Theater from 1978 to 1979 and a three-year tenure at Los Angeles's Nuart Theatre from 1978 to 1981. Future Lynch collaborators Nicolas Cage and Crispin Glover regularly attended screenings of the film together at the Nuart Theatre. During a run of screenings in New York and Los Angeles, Eraserhead was paired with the 1979 animated short film Asparagus, created by Suzan Pitt, for nearly two years.

Eraserhead was a commercial success, grossing $7 million in the United States and $14,590 in other territories. It also screened as part of the 1978 BFI London Film Festival and the 1986 Telluride Film Festival.

=== Home media ===
Eraserhead was released on VHS on August 7, 1982, by Columbia Pictures. The film was released on DVD and Blu-ray by Umbrella Entertainment in Australia; the former was released on August 1, 2009, and the latter on May 9, 2012. The Umbrella Entertainment releases include an 85-minute feature on the making of the film. Other home media releases of the film include DVD releases by Universal Pictures in 2001, Subversive Entertainment in 2006, Scanbox Entertainment in 2008, and a DVD and Blu-ray release by the Criterion Collection in September 2014.

== Reception ==
Upon Eraserhead's release, Variety ran a negative review, calling it "a sickening bad-taste exercise". The review expressed incredulity over the film's long gestation and called its finale unwatchable. Comparing Eraserhead to Lynch's next film The Elephant Man, Tom Buckley of The New York Times wrote that while the latter was a well-made film with an accomplished cast, the former was not. Buckley called Eraserhead "murkily pretentious" and wrote that its horror aspects stemmed solely from the appearance of the deformed child rather than its script or performances. Writing in 1984, Lloyd Rose of The Atlantic wrote that Eraserhead demonstrated that Lynch was "one of the most unalloyed surrealists ever to work in the movies". Rose called the film intensely personal, finding that unlike previous surrealist films, such as Luis Buñuel's 1929 Un Chien Andalou or 1930's L'Age d'Or, Lynch's imagery "isn't reaching out to us from his films; we're sinking into them". In a 1993 review for the Chicago Tribune, Michael Wilmington described Eraserhead as unique, feeling that the film's "intensity" and "nightmare clarity" were a result of Lynch's attention to detail in its creation due to his involvement in so many roles during its production. In the 1995 essay "Bad Ideas: The Art and Politics of Twin Peaks", critic Jonathan Rosenbaum wrote that Eraserhead represented Lynch's best work. Rosenbaum wrote that the director's artistic talent declined as his popularity grew, and contrasted the film with Wild at Heart—Lynch's most recent feature film at that time—saying "even the most cursory comparison of Eraserhead with Wild at Heart reveals an artistic decline so precipitous that it is hard to imagine the same person making both films". John Simon of the National Review called Eraserhead "a grossout for cultists".

More recent reception of the film has been highly favorable. On Rotten Tomatoes, the film holds an approval rating of 87% based on 86 reviews, with an average rating of 8.7/10. The site's critical consensus reads, "David Lynch's surreal Eraserhead uses detailed visuals and a creepy score to create a bizarre and disturbing look into a man's fear of parenthood." On Metacritic, the film has a weighted average score of 87 out of 100 based on 15 critics, indicating "universal acclaim".

Writing for Empire magazine, Steve Beard rated the film five stars out of five. He wrote that it was "a lot more radical and enjoyable than [Lynch's] later Hollywood efforts" and highlighted its mix of surrealist body horror and black comedy. The BBC's Almar Haflidason awarded Eraserhead three stars out of five, describing it as "an unremarkable feat by [Lynch's] later standards". Haflidason wrote that the film was a gathering of loosely related ideas, adding that it is "so consumed with surreal imagery that there are almost limitless possibilities to read personal theories into it"; the reviewer's own take on these themes were that they represented a fear of personal commitment and featured "a strong sexual undercurrent". A reviewer writing for Film4 rated Eraserhead five stars out of five, describing it as "by turns beautiful, annoying, funny, exasperating and repellent, but always bristling with a nervous energy". The Film4 reviewer wrote that Eraserhead was unlike most films released to that point, save for the collaborations between Luis Buñuel and Salvador Dalí. Lynch denied having seen any of these before Eraserhead. In The Village Voice, Nathan Lee praised the film's use of sound, writing "to see the film means nothing—one must also hear it". He called the film's sound design "an intergalactic seashell cocked to the ears of an acid-tripping gargantua".

The Guardian's Peter Bradshaw also awarded the film five stars out of five. He considered it a beautiful film, calling its sound design "industrial groaning, as if filmed inside some collapsing factory or gigantic dying organism". He compared it to Ridley Scott's 1979 film Alien. Jason Ankeny, writing for AllMovie, gave the film five stars out of five; he highlighted the film's disturbing sound design and called it "an open metaphor". He wrote that Eraserhead "sets up the obsessions that would follow [Lynch] through his career", adding his belief that the film's surrealism enhanced the understanding of the director's later films. In The Daily Telegraph, filmmaker Marc Evans praised both the sound design and Lynch's ability "to make the ordinary seem so odd", considering the film an inspiration for his own work. A review of the film in the same newspaper compared Eraserhead to the works of Irish playwright Samuel Beckett, calling it a chaotic parody of family life. Manohla Dargis, writing for The New York Times, called the film "less a straight story than a surrealistic assemblage". Dargis wrote that the film's imagery evoked the paintings of Francis Bacon and the Georges Franju 1949 documentary Blood of the Beasts. Film Threat's Phil Hall called Eraserhead Lynch's best film, claiming that his subsequent output failed to live up to it. Hall highlighted the film's soundtrack and Nance's "Chaplinesque" physical comedy as the film's stand-out elements.

== Legacy ==
In 2004, Eraserhead was selected for preservation in the National Film Registry by the United States Library of Congress. Selection for the Registry is based on a film being deemed "culturally, historically, or aesthetically significant". Eraserhead was one of the subjects featured in the 2005 documentary Midnight Movies: From the Margin to the Mainstream, which charted the rise of the midnight movie phenomenon in the late 1960s and 1970s; Lynch took part in the documentary through a series of interviews. The production covers six films which are credited as creating and popularizing the genre; also included are Night of the Living Dead, El Topo, Pink Flamingos, The Harder They Come, and The Rocky Horror Picture Show. In 2010, the Online Film Critics Society compiled a list of the 100 best directorial debuts, listing what they felt were the best first-time feature films by noted directors. Eraserhead placed second in the poll, behind Orson Welles's 1941 Citizen Kane.

Lynch collaborated with most of the cast and crew of Eraserhead again on later films. Frederick Elmes served as cinematographer on Blue Velvet, 1988's The Cowboy and the Frenchman, and 1990's Wild at Heart. Alan Splet provided sound design for The Elephant Man, Dune, and Blue Velvet. Jack Fisk directed episodes of Lynch's 1992 television series On the Air and worked as a production designer on 1999's The Straight Story and 2001's Mulholland Drive. Coulson and Nance appeared in Twin Peaks, and made further appearances in Dune, Blue Velvet, Wild at Heart, and 1997's Lost Highway.

Following the release of Eraserhead, Lynch attempted to find funding for his next project, Ronnie Rocket, a film "about electricity and a three-foot guy with red hair". Lynch met film producer Stuart Cornfeld during this time. Cornfeld had enjoyed Eraserhead and was interested in producing Ronnie Rocket; he worked for Mel Brooks and Brooksfilms at the time, and when the two realized that Ronnie Rocket was unlikely to find sufficient financing, Lynch asked to see some already-written scripts to consider for his next project. Cornfeld found four scripts that he felt would interest Lynch; on hearing the title of The Elephant Man, the director decided to make it his second film.

While working on The Elephant Man, Lynch heard that Eraserhead was the favorite film of American director Stanley Kubrick. Eraserhead also served as an influence on Kubrick's 1980 film The Shining; Kubrick reportedly screened the film for the cast and crew to "put them in the mood" that he wanted the film to achieve. Eraserhead is also credited with influencing the 1989 Japanese cyberpunk film Tetsuo: The Iron Man, the experimental 1989 horror film Begotten, and Darren Aronofsky's 1998 directorial debut Pi. Swiss artist H. R. Giger cited Eraserhead as "one of the greatest films [he had] ever seen", and said that it came closer to realizing his vision than even his own films. According to Giger, Lynch declined to collaborate with him on Dune because he felt Giger had "stolen his ideas".

Eli Roth and Noah Belson's The Rotten Fruit's sixth episode parodies the film director as David Lunch to film a music video with titular bands as castmates in a style of film-within-a-film, which also parodies the film Eraserhead.

Modern films that have been compared to Eraserhead include Vivarium (2019) for its depiction of family beginnings, the weird and surreal storytelling in Friend of the World (2020), the "nightmare-of-the-mind atmosphere" in Skinamarink (2022), and the "oversaturated black and white" Sincerely Saul (2024).

== See also ==
- List of cult films
- List of films with longest production time
