= Blue Velvet (film) =

1986 American neo-noir mystery film by David Lynch

- Theatrical release poster
- Directed by: David Lynch
- Written by: David Lynch
- Produced by: Fred Caruso
- Starring: Kyle MacLachlan; Isabella Rossellini; Dennis Hopper; Laura Dern; Hope Lange; George Dickerson; Dean Stockwell
- Cinematography: Frederick Elmes
- Edited by: Duwayne Dunham
- Music by: Angelo Badalamenti; David Lynch (Note: Additional Music)
- Distributed by: De Laurentiis Entertainment Group
- Release dates: September 12, 1986 (Toronto); September 19, 1986 (United States)
- Running time: 120 minutes
- Country: United States
- Language: English
- Budget: $6 million
- Box office: $8.6 million (North America)

Blue Velvet is a 1986 American mystery and thriller film written and directed by David Lynch. The film stars Kyle MacLachlan, Isabella Rossellini, Dennis Hopper, and Laura Dern, and is named after the 1951 song of the same name. The film follows a college student (MacLachlan), who returns to his hometown and discovers a severed human ear in a field, which leads him to uncover a criminal conspiracy involving a troubled nightclub singer (Rossellini).

Lynch's screenplay of Blue Velvet had been passed around multiple times in the late 1970s and early 1980s, with several major studios declining it due to its strong sexual and violent content. After the failure of his 1984 film Dune, Lynch made attempts at developing a more "personal story", somewhat characteristic of the surrealist style displayed in his first film Eraserhead (1977). The independent studio De Laurentiis Entertainment Group, owned at the time by Italian film producer Dino De Laurentiis, agreed to finance and produce the film.

Blue Velvet initially received a divided critical response, with many stating that its explicit content served little artistic purpose. Nevertheless, the film earned Lynch his second nomination for the Academy Award for Best Director, and received the year's Best Film and Best Director prizes from the National Society of Film Critics. It came to achieve cult status. As an example of a director casting against the norm, it was credited for revitalizing Hopper's career and providing Rossellini with a dramatic outlet beyond her previous work as a fashion model and cosmetics spokeswoman.

In the years since, the film has been re-evaluated, and is widely regarded as one of Lynch's masterpieces and is frequently cited as one of the greatest films of the 1980s. Publications including Sight and Sound, Time, Entertainment Weekly, and BBC Magazine have ranked it among the greatest American films of all time. In 2008, it was chosen by the American Film Institute as one of the 10 greatest American mystery films.

== Plot ==
College student Jeffrey Beaumont returns to his suburban hometown of Lumberton, North Carolina, after his father, Tom, has a near-fatal stroke. Walking home from the hospital, Jeffrey cuts through a vacant lot and discovers a severed human ear, which he takes to police detective John Williams. Williams's daughter Sandy tells Jeffrey that the ear somehow relates to a lounge singer named Dorothy Vallens. Intrigued, Jeffrey enters Dorothy's apartment by posing as a pest exterminator. While there, he steals a spare key while she is distracted by a man in a distinctive yellow sport coat, whom Jeffrey nicknames the "Yellow Man".

Jeffrey and Sandy attend Dorothy's nightclub act, in which she sings "Blue Velvet", and leave early so Jeffrey can break into her apartment. Dorothy returns home and undresses; she finds Jeffrey hiding in a closet and forces him to strip at knifepoint, but he retreats to the closet when Frank Booth, a psychopathic gangster and drug lord, arrives and interrupts their encounter. Frank beats and rapes Dorothy while inhaling gas from a canister, alternating between fits of sobbing and violent rage. After Frank leaves, Jeffrey sneaks away and seeks comfort from Sandy.

Surmising that Frank has abducted Dorothy's husband Don and son Donnie to force her into sexual slavery, Jeffrey suspects that Frank cut off Don's ear to intimidate her into submission. While continuing to see Sandy, Jeffrey enters into a sadomasochistic relationship with Dorothy, in which she encourages him to hit her. Jeffrey sees Frank attending Dorothy's show and later observes him selling drugs and meeting with the Yellow Man. Jeffrey then sees the Yellow Man meeting with a "well-dressed man".

When Frank catches Jeffrey leaving Dorothy's apartment, he abducts them and takes them to the lair of Ben, a criminal associate holding Don and Donnie hostage. Frank permits Dorothy to see her family and forces Jeffrey to watch Ben perform an impromptu lip-sync of Roy Orbison's "In Dreams", which moves Frank to tears. Afterwards, his gang and he take Jeffrey and Dorothy on a high-speed joyride to a sawmill yard, where he again attempts to sexually abuse Dorothy. When Jeffrey intervenes and punches him in the face, an enraged Frank and his gang pull him out of the car. Replaying the tape of "In Dreams", Frank smears lipstick on his face and violently kisses Jeffrey. Frank then has Jeffrey restrained and beats him unconscious, while Dorothy pleads for Frank to stop. Jeffrey awakens the next morning, bruised and bloodied.

While visiting the police station, Jeffrey discovers that the Yellow Man is Detective Williams's partner Tom Gordon, who has been murdering Frank's rival drug dealers and stealing confiscated narcotics from the evidence room for Frank to sell. After Jeffrey and Sandy declare their love for each other at a party, they are pursued by a car, which they assume belongs to Frank; as they arrive at Jeffrey's home, Sandy realizes the driver is her ex-boyfriend, Mike. After Mike threatens to beat Jeffrey for stealing his girlfriend, Dorothy appears on Jeffrey's porch naked, beaten, and confused. Mike backs down as Jeffrey and Sandy whisk Dorothy to Sandy's house to summon medical attention.

When Dorothy calls Jeffrey "my secret lover", a distraught Sandy slaps him for cheating on her. Jeffrey asks Sandy to tell her father everything, and Detective Williams then leads a police raid on Frank's headquarters, killing Frank's men. Jeffrey returns alone to Dorothy's apartment, where he discovers Don dead and with his ear missing and Gordon in a lobotomised state from being shot in the head. As Jeffrey leaves the apartment, the "well-dressed man" arrives, sees Jeffrey in the stairs, and chases him back inside. Jeffrey uses Gordon's walkie-talkie to say he is in the bedroom before hiding in the closet. The "well-dressed man" arrives at the apartment and Jeffrey observes he is actually Frank in disguise.

Jeffrey steals Gordon's gun and hides in the closet watching Frank search the apartment and kill Gordon. When Frank approaches the closet, Jeffrey fatally shoots him when he opens the door. Moments later, Sandy and Detective Williams arrive.

Some time later, Jeffrey and Sandy have continued their relationship, Tom Beaumont has recovered, and Dorothy has been reunited with her son.

== Cast ==
- Isabella Rossellini as Dorothy Vallens
- Kyle MacLachlan as Jeffrey Beaumont
- Dennis Hopper as Frank Booth
- Laura Dern as Sandy Williams
- Hope Lange as Mrs. Pam Williams
- Dean Stockwell as Ben
- George Dickerson as Detective John Williams
- Priscilla Pointer as Mrs. Frances Beaumont
- Frances Bay as Aunt Barbara
- Jack Harvey as Mr. Tom Beaumont
- Ken Stovitz as Mike Shaw
- Brad Dourif as Raymond
- Jack Nance as Paul
- J. Michael Hunter as Hunter
- Dick Green as Don Vallens
- Fred Pickler as Detective Tom Gordon, the "Yellow Man"
- Jon Jon Snipes as Little Donnie

== Production ==
=== Origin ===
Kyle is dressed like me. My father was a research scientist for the Department of Agriculture in Washington. We were in the woods all the time. I'd sorta had enough of the woods by the time I left, but still, lumber and lumberjacks, all this kinda thing, that's America to me like the picket fences and the roses in the opening shot. It's so burned in, that image, and it makes me feel so happy.

— David Lynch discusses the autobiographical content in Blue Velvet

The film's story originated from three ideas that crystallized in Lynch's mind over a period of time starting as early as 1973.

The first idea was only "a feeling" and the title, as Lynch told Cineaste in 1987.

The second idea was an image of a severed, human ear lying in a field. "I don't know why it had to be an ear. Except it needed to be an opening of a part of the body, a hole into something else ... The ear sits on the head and goes right into the mind so it felt perfect," Lynch remarked in a 1986 interview to The New York Times.

The third idea was Bobby Vinton's 1963 number-one, chart-topping rendition of "Blue Velvet" and "the mood that came with that song a mood, a time, and things that were of that time."

The scene in which Dorothy appears naked outside was inspired by a real-life experience Lynch had during childhood when his brother and he saw a naked woman walking down a neighborhood street at night. The experience was so traumatic to the young Lynch that it made him cry, and he had never forgotten it.

After completing The Elephant Man (1980), Lynch met producer Richard Roth over coffee. Roth had read and enjoyed Lynch's Ronnie Rocket script, but did not want to produce it. He asked Lynch if the filmmaker had any other scripts, but the director only had ideas. "I told him I had always wanted to sneak into a girl's room to watch her into the night and that, maybe, at one point or another, I would see something that would be the clue to a murder mystery. Roth loved the idea and asked me to write a treatment. I went home and thought of the ear in the field." Production was announced in August 1984. Lynch wrote two more drafts before he was satisfied with the script of the film. The problem with them, Lynch has said, was that "there was maybe all the unpleasantness in the film but nothing else. A lot was not there. And so it went away for a while." Conditions at this point were ideal for Lynch's film: he had made a deal with Dino De Laurentiis that gave him complete artistic freedom and final cut privileges, with the stipulation that he take a cut in his salary and work with a budget of only $6 million (equivalent to $18,593,850 in 2025). This deal meant that Blue Velvet was the smallest film on De Laurentiis's slate; consequently, Lynch would be left mostly unsupervised during production. Lynch later stated, "After Dune, I was down so far that anything was up! So it was just a euphoria. And when you work with that kind of feeling, you can take chances. You can experiment."

=== Casting ===
The cast of Blue Velvet included several then-relatively unknown actors.

Lynch met Isabella Rossellini at a restaurant and offered her the role of Dorothy Vallens. Helen Mirren had been Lynch's first choice for the role. Rossellini had gained some exposure before the film for her Lancôme ads in the early 1980s and for being the daughter of actress Ingrid Bergman and director Roberto Rossellini. After completion of the film, during test screenings, ICM Partners—the agency representing Rossellini—immediately dropped her as a client. Furthermore, the nuns at the school in Rome that Rossellini attended in her youth called to say they were praying for her.

Kyle MacLachlan had played the central role in Lynch's critical and commercial failure Dune (1984), a science-fiction epic based on Frank Herbert's novel of the same name. MacLachlan later became a recurring collaborator with Lynch, who remarked: "Kyle plays innocents who are interested in the mysteries of life. He's the person you trust enough to go into a strange world with." Val Kilmer was offered a role in the film, but he turned it down, as he felt it was too "graphic" for him, a decision he later regretted. Dourif and Stockwell also rejoined Lynch from Dune.

Dennis Hopper was the best-known actor in the film, having directed and starred in Easy Rider (1969). Hopper—said to be Lynch's third choice (Michael Ironside has stated that Frank was written with him in mind)—accepted the role, reportedly having exclaimed, "I've got to play Frank! I am Frank!" Harry Dean Stanton and Steven Berkoff both turned down the role of Frank because of the violent content in the film.

Laura Dern, then 18 years old, was cast as Sandy after several already-successful actresses turned the role down, including Molly Ringwald. At the time, Dern was enrolled at the University of California, Los Angeles, as a psychology student, but she dropped out two days into the semester to work on the film.

=== Shooting ===
Principal photography for Blue Velvet began in August 1985 and completed in November. The film was shot at EUE/Screen Gems studio in Wilmington, North Carolina, which also provided the exterior scenes of Lumberton. The scene with a raped and battered Dorothy proved to be particularly challenging. Several townspeople arrived to watch the filming with picnic baskets and rugs, against the wishes of Rossellini and Lynch. However, they continued filming as normal, and when Lynch yelled cut, the townspeople left. As a result, police told Lynch they were no longer permitted to shoot in any public areas of Wilmington.

The Carolina Apartments in downtown Wilmington served as Dorothy's apartment building, with the adjacent Kenan fountain featured prominently in many shots. The building is also the birthplace and deathplace of noted artist Claude Howell. The apartment building stands today, and the Kenan fountain was refurbished in 2020 after sustaining heavy damage during Hurricane Florence.

=== Editing ===
Lynch's original rough cut ran about four hours. Contractually obligated to deliver a two-hour movie by De Laurentiis, he cut many small subplots and character scenes. He also made cuts at the request of the MPAA; for example, when Frank slaps Dorothy after the first rape scene, the audience was supposed to see Frank actually hitting her. Instead, the film cuts away to Jeffrey in the closet, wincing at what he has just seen. This cut was made to satisfy the MPAA's concerns about violence, though Lynch thought that the change made the scene more disturbing.

In 2011, Lynch announced that deleted scenes long thought lost had been discovered. This material was included on the subsequent Blu-ray release of the film. Some of these scenes featured Megan Mullally as Jeffrey's college sweetheart Louise Wertham, whose entire role was cut from the theatrical release. The final cut of the film runs at just over two hours.

=== Distribution ===
Because the material was completely different from anything that would be considered mainstream at the time, De Laurentiis Entertainment Group's marketing employees were unsure of how to promote the film or even if it would be promoted at all; they only began to promote it after the positive receptions the film received at various film festivals.

== Interpretations ==
"I guess it means there's trouble until the robins come": Throughout the film, a dream Sandy had is alluded to, in which the world was full of darkness and turmoil until a group of robins were [sic] set free, unleashing blinding light and love. Lighting is a strong symbolic aspect of the film, illustrated in this second shot which is lit from above before fading out, representing a return to normality.

Despite Blue Velvet's initial appearance as a mystery, the film operates on a number of thematic levels. The film owes a large debt to 1950s film noir, containing and exploring such conventions as the femme fatale (Dorothy Vallens), a seemingly unstoppable villain (Frank Booth), and the questionable moral outlook of the hero (Jeffrey Beaumont), as well as its unusual use of shadowy, sometimes dark cinematography. Blue Velvet establishes Lynch's famous "askew vision" and introduces several common elements of his work, some of which would later become his trademarks, including distorted characters, a polarized world, and debilitating damage to the skull or brain. Perhaps the most significant Lynchian trademark in the film is the unearthing of a dark underbelly in a seemingly idealized small town; Jeffrey even proclaims in the film that he is "seeing something that was always hidden". Lynch's characterization of films, symbols, and motifs has become well known, and his particular style, characterized largely in Blue Velvet for the first time, has been written about extensively using descriptions such as "dreamlike", "ultraweird", "dark", and "oddball". Red curtains also appear in key scenes, specifically in Dorothy's apartment and at the night club where she sings, which have since become a Lynch trademark. The film has been compared to Alfred Hitchcock's Psycho (1960) because of its stark treatment of evil and mental illness. The premise of both films is curiosity, leading to an investigation that draws the lead characters into a hidden, voyeuristic underworld of crime.

The film's thematic framework harks back to Edgar Allan Poe, Henry James, and early gothic fiction, as well as films such as Shadow of a Doubt (1943) and The Night of the Hunter (1955) and the entire notion of film noir. Lynch has called it a "film about things that are hidden - within a small city and within people."

Feminist psychoanalytic film theorist Laura Mulvey argues that Blue Velvet establishes a metaphorical oedipal family—"the child", Jeffrey Beaumont, and his "parents" Frank Booth and Dorothy Vallens—through deliberate references to film noir. Michael Atkinson claims that the resulting violence in the film can be read as symbolic of domestic violence within real families. He reads Jeffrey as an innocent youth who is both horrified by the violence inflicted by Frank and tempted by it as the means of possessing Dorothy for himself. Atkinson takes a Freudian approach to the film, considering it to be an expression of the traumatised innocence which characterises Lynch's work. He states, "Dorothy represents the sexual force of the mother [figure] because she is forbidden and because she becomes the object of the unhealthy, infantile impulses at work in Jeffrey's subconscious."

=== Symbolism ===
Symbolism is used heavily in Blue Velvet. The most consistent symbolism in the film is an insect motif introduced at the end of the first scene, when the camera zooms in on a well-kept suburban lawn until it unearths a swarming underground nest of bugs. This is generally recognized as a metaphor for the seedy underworld that Jeffrey will soon discover under the surface of his own suburban paradise. The severed ear he finds is being overrun by black ants. The bug motif is recurrent throughout the film, most notably in the bug-like gas mask that Frank wears and Jeffrey's exterminator disguise. One of Frank's accomplices is also consistently identified through the yellow jacket he wears, possibly referencing the name of a type of wasp. Finally, a robin eating a bug on a fence becomes a topic of discussion in the last scene of the film.

The severed ear that Jeffrey discovers is also a key symbolic element, leading Jeffrey into danger. Indeed, just as Jeffrey's troubles begin, the audience is treated to a nightmarish sequence in which the camera zooms into the canal of the severed, decomposing ear. After the danger has subsided at the end the ear canal closeup is repeated, zooming out on a healthy and clean ear.

== Soundtrack ==
The Blue Velvet soundtrack was supervised by Angelo Badalamenti (who makes a brief cameo appearance as the pianist at the Slow Club where Dorothy performs). The soundtrack uses vintage pop songs such as Bobby Vinton's "Blue Velvet" and Roy Orbison's "In Dreams", juxtaposed with an orchestral score. During filming, Lynch placed speakers on set and in the streets and played the music of Dmitri Shostakovich to set the mood he wanted to convey. The score alludes to Shostakovich's Symphony No. 15, which Lynch had been listening to regularly while writing the screenplay. Lynch wanted to feature "Song to the Siren" by This Mortal Coil in the scene in which Sandy and Jeffrey dance; however, he could not obtain the rights for the song at the time; he would go on to use this song in Lost Highway 11 years later.

Entertainment Weekly ranked Blue Velvet's soundtrack on its list of the 100 Greatest Film Soundtracks at the 100th position. Critic John Alexander wrote, "the haunting soundtrack accompanies the title credits, then weaves through the narrative, accentuating the noir mood of the film." Lynch worked with composer Angelo Badalamenti for the first time in this film and asked him to write a score that had to be "like Shostakovich, be very Russian, but make it the most beautiful thing but make it dark and a little bit scary." Badalamenti's success with Blue Velvet would lead him to contribute to all of Lynch's subsequent feature films and his and Mark Frost's television series Twin Peaks. Also included in the sound team was long-time Lynch collaborator Alan Splet, a sound editor and designer who had won an Academy Award for his work on The Black Stallion (1979) and been nominated for Never Cry Wolf (1983).

== Reception ==
=== Box office ===
Blue Velvet premiered in competition at the Montreal World Film Festival in August 1986, at the Toronto Festival of Festivals on September 12, 1986, and a few days later in the United States. It debuted commercially in both countries on September 19, 1986, in 98 theaters across the U.S. In its opening weekend, the film grossed a total of $789,409. It eventually expanded to another 15 theatres, and in the U.S. and Canada grossed a total of $8,551,228. Blue Velvet was met with uproar by its audiences, with lines formed around city blocks in New York City and Los Angeles. Mass walkouts and refund demands were reported during its opening week. At a Chicago screening, a man fainted and had to have his pacemaker checked; upon revival, he returned to the cinema to see the ending. At a Los Angeles cinema, two strangers became engaged in a heated disagreement, but resolved the disagreement to return to the theatre.

=== Critical reception ===
The film is widely considered a masterpiece and holds an approval of 86% on Rotten Tomatoes based on 175 reviews, with an average rating of 8.2/10. The website's critical consensus states: "If audiences walk away from this subversive, surreal shocker not fully understanding the story, they might also walk away with a deeper perception of the potential of film storytelling." The film also has a score of 75 out of 100 on Metacritic based on 15 critics, indicating "generally favorable" reviews. Looking back on his Guardian/Observer review, critic Philip French wrote, "The film is wearing well and has attained a classic status without becoming respectable or losing its sense of danger." Audiences polled by CinemaScore gave the film an average grade of "B−" on an A+ to F scale.

Blue Velvet met a very polarized reception in the U.S. The New York Times critic Janet Maslin felt, "Mr. Hopper and Miss Rossellini are so far outside the bounds of ordinary acting here that their performances are best understood in terms of sheer lack of inhibition; both give themselves entirely over to the material, which seems to be exactly what's called for." She called the film "an instant cult classic", which "is as fascinating as it is freakish" and "confirms Mr. Lynch's stature as an innovator, a superb technician, and someone best not encountered in a dark alley." Sheila Benson of the Los Angeles Times called the film "the most brilliantly disturbing film ever to have its roots in small-town American life," describing it as "shocking, visionary, rapturously controlled". Film critic Gene Siskel included Blue Velvet on his list of the best films of 1986, at the fifth spot. Upon its initial release, directors Woody Allen and Martin Scorsese both called Blue Velvet the best film of the year. Peter Travers of Rolling Stone later named it the best film of the 1980s and an "American masterpiece".

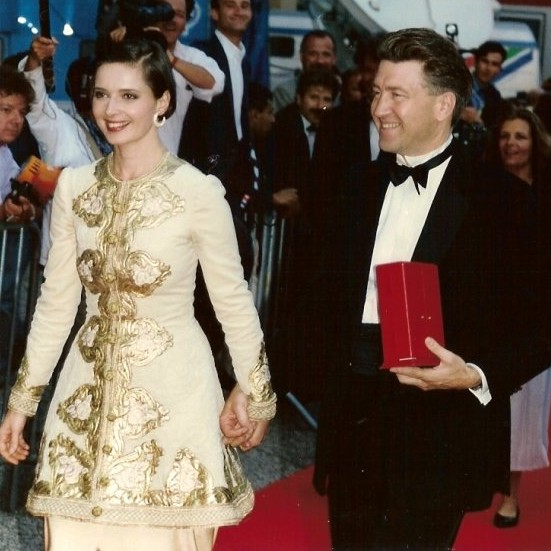
Rossellini and Lynch at the 1990 Cannes Film Festival

Among detractors, Paul Attanasio of The Washington Post said that while "the film showcases a visual stylist utterly in command of his talents" and Badalamenti "contributes an extraordinary score, slipping seamlessly from slinky jazz to violin figures to the romantic sweep of a classic Hollywood score, [Lynch] isn't interested in communicating, he's interested in parading his personality. The movie doesn't progress or deepen, it just gets weirder, and to no good end." Many critics in the United States asserted that the film's sexual and violent content compromised its artistic value, and some condemned it as pornographic. Roger Ebert stated that the large amount of "jokey small-town satire" in the film made it difficult to take seriously. He praised Rossellini's performance as "convincing and courageous", but considered her to have been "degraded, slapped around, humiliated, and undressed in front of the camera. And when you ask an actress to endure those experiences, you should keep your side of the bargain by putting her in an important film." While Ebert later came to consider Lynch a great filmmaker, his negative view of Blue Velvet remained.

Mark Kermode walked out on the film and gave the film a poor review upon its release, but revised his view of the film over time. In 2016, he remarked: "as a film critic, it taught me that when a film really gets under your skin and really provokes a visceral reaction, you have to be very careful about assessing it ... I didn't walk out on Blue Velvet because it was a bad film. I walked out on it because it was a really good film. The point was at the time I wasn't good enough for it."

=== Accolades ===
David Lynch was nominated for the Academy Award for Best Director and the Golden Globe Award for Best Screenplay for his work on the film. Dennis Hopper was nominated for the Golden Globe Award for Best Supporting Actor – Motion Picture for his performance, while Isabella Rossellini won the Independent Spirit Award for Best Female Lead for her performance. Lynch won Best Director and Hopper won Best Supporting Actor at the Los Angeles Film Critics Association awards in 1987. That same year, the film received four National Society of Film Critics awards: Best Film, Best Director (Lynch), Best Cinematography (Frederick Elmes), and Best Supporting Actor (Hopper).

== Home media ==
Blue Velvet was released on VHS and LaserDisc by Karl-Lorimar Home Video in 1987 and re-issued by Warner Home Video in 1991. After that, it was released on DVD in 2000 and 2002 by MGM Home Entertainment. The film made its Blu-ray debut on November 8, 2011, with a special 25th-anniversary edition featuring never-before-seen deleted scenes. On May 28, 2019, the film was re-released on Blu-ray by the Criterion Collection, featuring a 4K digital restoration, the original stereo soundtrack and other special features, including a behind-the-scenes documentary titled Blue Velvet Revisited. Criterion later released the film as a 4K Ultra HD Blu-ray/Blu-ray combo pack on June 25, 2024.

== Legacy ==
Blue Velvet has weathered the passage of time better than any other Oscar nominee that year, possibly better than any Hollywood movie of its decade. The shock of the new fades by definition, but if it has hardly done so in the case of Blue Velvet, that may be because its tone remains forever elusive.

— Dennis Lim, 2016

Although it initially gained a relatively small theatrical audience in North America and was met with controversy over its artistic merit, Blue Velvet became the center of a "national firestorm" in 1986 and over time became regarded as a classic. In the late 1980s and early 1990s after its release on videotape, the film became a widely recognized cult film for its dark depiction of a suburban America. With its many VHS, LaserDisc and DVD releases, the film reached broader American audiences. It marked David Lynch's entry into the Hollywood mainstream and Dennis Hopper's comeback. Hopper's performance as Frank Booth has itself left an imprint on popular culture, with countless tributes, cultural references and parodies. The film's success also helped Hollywood address previously censored issues, as Psycho (1960) had. Blue Velvet has been frequently compared to that ground-breaking film. It has become one of the most significant, well-recognized films of its era, spawning countless imitations and parodies in media. The film's dark, stylish, and erotic production design has served as a benchmark for a number of films, parodies, and even Lynch's own later work, notably Twin Peaks (1990–91), and Mulholland Drive (2001). Peter Travers of Rolling Stone cited it as one of the most "influential American films", as did Michael Atkinson, who dedicated a book to the film's themes and motifs.

Blue Velvet frequently appears in critical assessments of all-time great films, is ranked as one of the greatest films of the 1980s, one of the best examples of American surrealism, and one of the finest examples of David Lynch's work. In a poll of 54 American critics ranking the "most outstanding films of the decade", Blue Velvet was placed fourth, behind Raging Bull (1980), E.T. the Extra-Terrestrial (1982), and Wings of Desire (1987). An Entertainment Weekly book special released in 1999 ranked Blue Velvet as 37th of the greatest films of all time. The film was ranked 11th by FilmSite.org in its list of the 100 Greatest Films. Film Four ranked it on their list of 100 Greatest Films. In a 2007 poll of the online film community held by Variety, Blue Velvet came in at the 95th-greatest film of all time. Total Film ranked Blue Velvet as one of the all-time best films in both a critics' list and a public poll, in 2006 and 2007, respectively. In December 2002, a UK film critics' poll in Sight & Sound ranked the film fifth on their list of the 10 Best Films of the Last 25 Years. In a special Entertainment Weekly issue, 100 new film classics were chosen from 1983 to 2008: Blue Velvet was ranked at fourth.

In addition to Blue Velvet's various "all-time greatest films" rankings, the American Film Institute has awarded the film three honors in its lists: 96th on 100 Years ... 100 Thrills in 2001, selecting cinema's most thrilling moments and ranked Frank Booth 36th of the 50 greatest villains in 100 Years ... 100 Heroes and Villains in 2003. In June 2008, the AFI revealed its "ten Top Ten"—the best ten films in ten "classic" American film genres—after polling over 1,500 people from the creative community. Blue Velvet was acknowledged as the eighth best film in the mystery genre. Premiere magazine listed Frank Booth, played by Dennis Hopper, as the 54th on its list of 'The 100 Greatest Movie Characters of All Time', calling him one of "the most monstrously funny creations in cinema history". The film was ranked 84th on Bravo Television's four-hour program 100 Scariest Movie Moments (2004). It is frequently sampled musically and an array of bands and solo artists have taken their names and inspiration from the film. In August 2012, Sight & Sound unveiled their latest list of the 250 greatest films of all time, with Blue Velvet ranking at 69th.

Blue Velvet was also nominated for the following AFI lists:

- AFI's 100 Years...100 Movies
- AFI's 100 Years...100 Heroes & Villains
  - Frank Booth – ranked 36th-greatest film villain
- AFI's 100 Years...100 Songs:
  - "In Dreams" - nominated
- AFI's 100 Years...100 Movies (10th Anniversary Edition)

Lana Del Rey recorded a cover version of "Blue Velvet" inspired by the film in 2012. Used to endorse clothing line H&M, a music video accompanied the track and aired as a television commercial inspired by Blue Velvet and other works by Lynch. In the video, Del Rey plays the role of Dorothy Vallens, performing a private concert similar to the scene where Ben pantomimes "In Dreams" for Frank Booth. Del Rey's version, however, has her lip-syncing "Blue Velvet" when a little person dressed as Frank Sinatra approaches and unplugs a hidden record player. Lynch praised the video: "Lana Del Rey, she's got some fantastic charisma and—this is a very interesting thing—it's like she's born out of another time. She's got something that's very appealing to people. And I didn't know she was influenced by me!"

== See also ==
- List of cult films
