= Famous Places =

Studio album by Goldmund
- Released: August 2010
- Genre: Ambient, Electronica
- Label: Western Vinyl

Goldmund chronology
Live at the Triple Door (2010)	Famous Places (2010)

Professional ratings
Review scores
Source	Rating
AllMusic	4/5 stars

Famous Places is the third album of American ambient musician Keith Kenniff under the Goldmund moniker. Famous Places features piano compositions named after locations that have played an important part in Kenniff's life to date. A close-miced recording technique accentuates the simplicity and intimacy of Kenniff's melodious musings, and while the piano solo is clearly the medium the Goldmund project is predominantly concerned with, Kenniff frequently adds contextual details to his recordings, setting his keywork among billowy, abstract drones, a few quietly mixed-in additional instruments and occasional percussion (such as 'Dane Street').

== Track listing ==
All tracks are written by Keith Kenniff.

No.	Title	Length
1.	"Alberta"	2:32
2.	"Bergen"	1:56
3.	"Bowen"	1:31
4.	"Brown Creek"	4:27
5.	"Conestoga"	2:38
6.	"Dane Street"	3:10
7.	"Edale"	3:41
8.	"Fort McClary"	3:34
9.	"Grass Rides"	2:39
10.	"Havelock"	3:15
11.	"Hope Avenue"	2:54
12.	"Jones Beach Dunes"	4:20
13.	"Pine View"	1:36
14.	"Safe Harbor"	3:01
15.	"Saranac"	3:21
