= Ayres (album) =

Studio album by Helios
- Released: July 10, 2007
- Genre: Ambient, electronica
- Length: 27:37
- Label: Type, Unseen

Helios chronology
Eingya (2006)	Ayres (2007)	Caesura (2008)

Professional ratings
Review scores
Source	Rating
AllMusic	4/5 stars
PopMatters	(7/10)

Ayres is Keith Kenniff's third album under his Helios moniker. This is the only Helios album that contains vocals. There is also a remastered, instrumental version of "Ayres".

== Track listing ==
All tracks are written by Keith Kenniff.

No.	Title	Length
1.	"A Rising Wind"	5:05
2.	"Woods and Gives Away"	5:44
3.	"Signed I Wish You Well"	4:57
4.	"Soft Collared Neck"	3:23
5.	"The Obeisant Vine"	4:27
6.	"In Heaven"	4:01
