= La Biographie de Luka Philipsen =

Studio album by Keren Ann
- Released: 18 April 2000 (France)
- Genre: Alt-folk, folk rock, trip hop
- Label: EMI
- Producer: Benjamin Biolay

Keren Ann chronology
La Biographie de Luka Philipsen (2000)	La Disparition (2002)

Professional ratings
Review scores
Source	Rating
allmusic	4/5 stars

La Biographie de Luka Philipsen is Keren Ann’s first album. The name "Luka Philipsen" is derived from Suzanne Vega's song "Luka" and Keren Ann's grandmother's last name.

== Track listing ==
All tracks written by Keren Ann Zeidel and Benjamin Biolay, except where noted.

1. "Dimanche en hiver" - 3:51
2. "Dans ma ville" - 3:05
3. "Seule" - 3:30
4. "On est loin" - 3:42
5. "Sur le fil" - 4:38
6. "Peut-être" (Zeidel) - 3:14
7. "Reste là" - 3:05
8. "Décrocher les étoiles" (duet with Benjamin Biolay) - 3:53
9. "Jardin d'hiver" (Zeidel, Biolay, Henri Salvador) - 2:58
10. "Aéroplane" - 3:52
11. "Deux" (Zeidel) - 3:18
12. "Mercenaires" - 3:39
13. "Autour de l'arbre" - 3:46

== Personnel ==
- Keren Ann: Vocal, Guitar, Piano, Clarinet
- Benjamin Biolay: Electric & Acoustic Guitars, Keyboards & Piano, Trombone, Trumpet
- Lionel Gaillardin: Electric & Acoustic Guitars, Drum Programming
- Laurent Vernerey: Bass
- Francky Moulet: Bass
- David Maurin: Drums
- Karen Brunon, Christophe Morin: Celli
- Orchestra (Guy Arbion, J.B. Beauchamps, Christophe Briquet, Isabelle Sajot, Lucien Schmit, Sébastien Surel) & Choir Arranged & Conducted By Benjamin Biolay
