= Bang Gang =

Downtempo band from Iceland

- Origin: Reykjavík, Iceland
- Genres: Folk; trip hop; indie pop; electronic; downtempo; shoegaze
- Years active: 1996–present
- Labels: Sproti; Bang ehf; EMI; Cod Music; From Nowhere; Discograph
- Members: Barði Jóhannsson
- Past members: Henrik Baldvin Björnsson; Esther Talia Casey

Bang Gang is a downtempo band from Iceland founded by songwriter and producer Barði Jóhannsson (see also Lady & Bird). The band was formed in 1996, in Barði's hometown of Reykjavík. Bang Gang were initially a surf band but it moved into melodic pop.

While Barði has worked with a number of vocalists and musicians, he remains the only constant member. The band's second album Something Wrong followed in 2003 and their acclaimed Ghosts From The Past was released on Discograph in 2008. The most recent album The Wolves Are Whispering has been described by journalists as "Atmospheric Ghost Pop" and has a sound that is unique.

The band is recognized for its blend of songwriting, electronica and glacial atmospheres. The band has toured the world playing festivals like Iceland Airwaves, Cannes Film festival, Novosonic, For Noise, Montreaux Jazz Festival, CMJ and SXSW and a number of independent shows at venues such as Salle Pleyel, Gramercy theater, Getty Center and more across Europe and North America.

== Albums ==
=== You (1998) ===
When Henrik Baldvin Björnsson left Bang Gang, Barði and Esther Talia Casey continued working together under the Bang Gang name. Their first song was used on the soundtrack of Icelandic movie Blossi 810551. Their second, "Sleep", was recorded for a compilation released by Sproti Records and was used for a Citroen campaign.

The single "Sleep" was released in 1998 and featured a video by director Ragnar Bragason. Followed by another single and video for the song "So Alone".

Their first album, You, was released in Iceland in 1998. The band signed a deal with East-West France, who released You in 2000. The French version featured remixes by French musician Kid Loco.

=== Something Wrong (2003) ===
Something Wrong was the follow-up to 2000’s You. The album was released in 2003 as a follow-up on 2002’s untitled EP. It features Bang Gang's distinctive mix of atmospheric songwriting and haunting electronica and features vocal performances from Nicolette, Phoebe Tolmer, Esther, GusGus vocalist Daniel Agust Haraldsson and long-term collaborator Keren Ann.

Various songs from Something Wrong were used for TV, film and other media. For example, the song "Follow" was used in Fox TV show The O.C.; "Inside" was used for an Emporio Armani advertisement and was featured in the movie Cashback and the trailer for the film Triage; and "Find What You Get" has been used in commercials for the car Lancia Musa.

=== Ghosts from the Past (2008) ===
Ghosts from the Past was Bang Gang’s third album. The album features vocalists and co-writers Keren Ann and Anthony Gonzales (M83). The album features pop rock singles "I Know You Sleep", "Don't Feel Ashamed" and included an opera singer on the title track. The song "Lost in Wonderland" was used for the Oscar season trailer at Sky Movies.

=== The Wolves Are Whispering (2015) ===
The Wolves Are Whispering is the fourth studio album of Bang Gang.

The record features guest writers and vocalists Keren Ann, Helen Marnie (Ladytron), Bloodgroup and Jofridur Akadottir (Samaris, Pascal Pinon)

== Discography ==
- You (1998)
- Something Wrong (2003)
- Ghosts from the Past (2008)
- The Wolves Are Whispering (2015)
