= Lady & Bird =

Studio album by Lady & Bird
- Released: 2003
- Genre: Electronic; rock
- Label: Rebel Group

Lady & Bird chronology
Lady & Bird (2003)	La Ballade of Lady & Bird (2009)

Lady & Bird is the debut studio album from a collaboration between the singer/songwriter Keren Ann and Barði Jóhannson, the lead singer of the Icelandic band Bang Gang. The album contains a cover of "Suicide Is Painless", the theme from the 1970 motion picture M*A*S*H.

== Track listing ==
1. "Do What I Do"
2. "Shepard's Song"
3. "Stephanie Says" (The Velvet Underground cover)
4. "Walk Real Slow"
5. "Suicide Is Painless" (theme from M*A*S*H)
6. "The Morning After"
7. "Run in the Morning Sun"
8. "See Me Fall"
9. "Blue Skies"
10. "La ballade of Lady and Bird"
11. "Do What I Do" (acoustic, live)
