= Keith Kenniff =

Ambient musician

- Also known as: Helios, Goldmund, Mint Julep, Harbors, Meadows
- Genres: Ambient, electronica
- Occupations: Composer, writer, sound designer
- Years active: 2004–present
- Labels: Unseen, Merck, Type, Western Vinyl, Circle into Square, Village Green, Ghostly International, Nettwerk

Keith Kenniff is a Canadian-American composer, multi-instrumentalist, and electronic music producer. He composes ambient/electronic music under the moniker Helios and post-classical piano music under Goldmund. He is also one half of the indie band Mint Julep, and ambient project A Pale Fire (previously Hollie & Keith Kenniff). Kenniff is also a composer for film, television, dance and performance art. In 2010, he created the record label, Unseen. He composed the song "Years" for Facebook's 'A Look Back' feature, as well as composing the soundtrack for the Emmy Award winning documentary, Blood Road.

== Biography ==
Kenniff graduated from Berklee College of Music in 2006 with a B.A. in percussion and composition. In 2004, Unomia, Kenniff's first album under the moniker 'Helios', was released. This was followed by the critically acclaimed album Eingya in 2006. His third album, Caesura, was released in 2008.

Kenniff also records and performs music for solo piano under the name Goldmund, for which he has six releases on Unseen Music, Type Records, and Western Vinyl. He has toured and performed extensively throughout the US, Europe, Japan and Canada.

He has an indie rock/shoegaze band with his wife under the name Mint Julep. In late 2010, they released an EP called "Adorn". The band followed up with the release of their first album, Save Your Season, in 2011. The Kenniffs also have a children's music project, Meadows (inspired by the couple's young son), whose debut album, The Littlest Star was released in mid-2011.

== Discography ==
As Helios

- Unomia (2004)
- Eingya (2006)
- Ayres (2007)
- Caesura (2008)
- Unleft (2009)
- Moiety (2012)
- Yume (2015)
- Remembrance (2016)
- Veriditas (2018)
- Domicile (2020)
- Espera (2023)

As Goldmund

- Corduroy Road (2005)
- The Heart of High Places (2006)
- Two Point Discrimination (2007)
- The Malady of Elegance (2008)
- Famous Places (2010)
- All Will Prosper (2011)
- Sometimes (2015)
- Occasus (2018)
- The Time It Takes (2020)
- Layers of Afternoon (2025)
- In Each Moment (2026)

With Meadows

- The Littlest Star (2011)

With Mint Julep

- Songs About Snow (2008)
- Adorn (2011)
- Save Your Season (2011)
- Broken Devotion (2016)
- Stray Fantasies (2020)
- In a Deep and Dreamless Sleep (2021)
- Wildfire (TBA)

With Harbors

- When We Are Free (2025)

As Keith Kenniff

- Live at The Triple Door (2008–2009)
- The Last Survivor (2010)
- Branches (2010)
- Blood Road Motion Picture Soundtrack (2017)
- The Runaway Bunny (HBO Max: Original Motion Picture Soundtrack) (2021)
- It Shall Appear (2023)
