= Keren Ann =

French singer

Keren Ann קרן אן
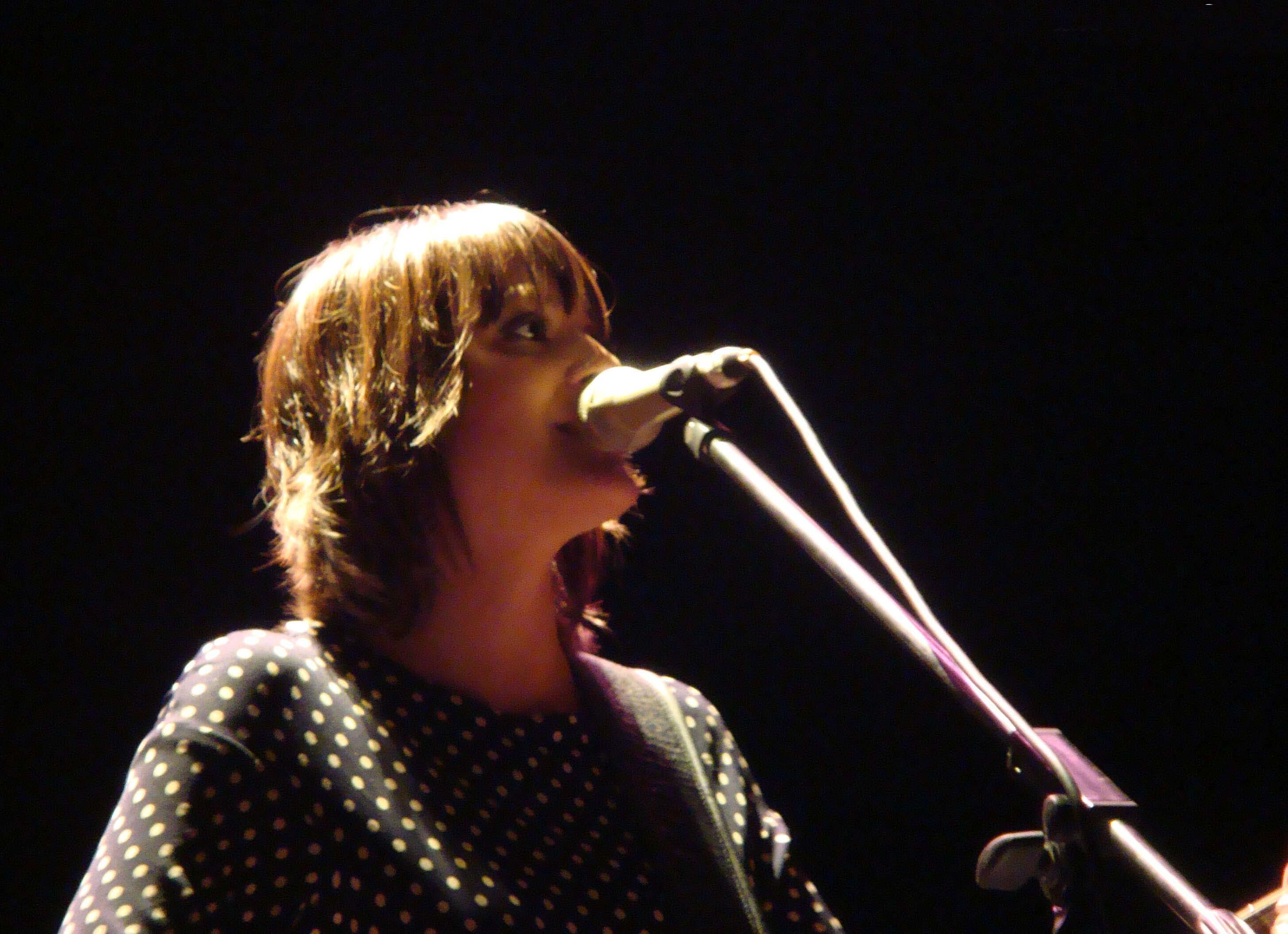
- Keren Ann in 2008

Background information
- Born: 10 March 1974 (age 52); Caesarea, Israel
- Genres: Pop; French pop; folk rock; world
- Instruments: Vocals; guitar; piano; clarinet
- Years active: 2000–present
- Labels: EMI; Capitol; Metro Blue; Yellow Tangerine; Delabel; Blue Note; Polydor
- Website: kerenann.com

Keren Ann Zeidel (Hebrew: קרן אן זיידל; born 10 March 1974), known professionally as Keren Ann (קרן אן), is an Israeli, French, and Dutch singer, songwriter, composer, producer, arranger, and sound engineer. She performs mainly in French and English, and she's based in Paris, Tel Aviv, and New York City. She plays guitar, piano, and clarinet.

== Early life ==
Keren Ann Zeidel was born in Caesarea, Israel, to a Russian-Jewish father and a Dutch-Javanese mother. She lived in Israel and in the Netherlands until the age of 11, when her family moved to Paris.

Ann's mother converted to Judaism and as a result she considers herself "absolutely Jewish".

== Career ==
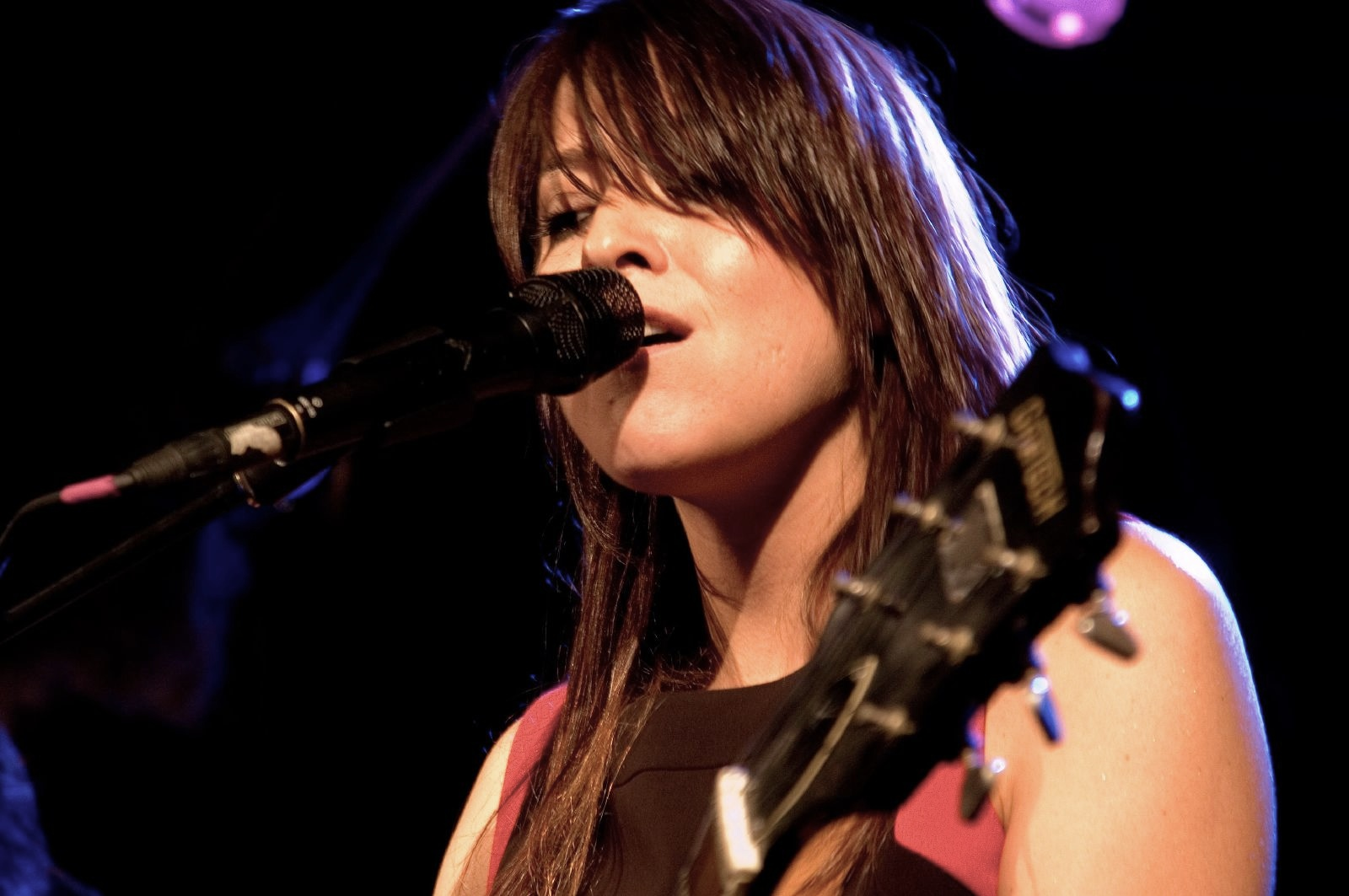
Keren Ann performing in 2006

Keren Ann has released eight solo albums: La Biographie de Luka Philipsen (2000), La Disparition (2002), Not Going Anywhere (2003), Nolita (2005), Keren Ann (2007), 101 (2011), You're Gonna Get Love (2016) and Bleue (2019). Many of her songs have been covers of other artists, including Henri Salvador, Jane Birkin, Françoise Hardy, Rosa Passos, Jacky Terrasson, Emmanuelle Seigner, Benjamin Biolay and Anna Calvi. Her music has been featured in TV series including Grey's Anatomy, Six Feet Under and Big Love, and in movies including Love Me No More (2008). Her song "Beautiful Day" has been the sound of the SkyTeam campaign, and in 2008 her song "Lay Your Head Down" was the sync for the international H&M Spring commercial.

Keren Ann and Icelandic musician Barði Jóhannsson formed the musical duo Lady & Bird; the two released a self-titled studio album in 2003, as well as a live recording of their performance with the Iceland Symphony Orchestra in 2009. The two co-wrote the 2011 opera Red Waters; it was produced by the Opéra de Rouen and directed by Arthur Nauzyciel, and performed in four opera houses around France.

Keren Ann co-wrote Henri Salvador's 2000 album Chambre Avec Vue, and wrote the lyrics for Sophie Hunter's 2005 debut album, Isis Project, to music written by Guy Chambers. In 2008, Keren Ann composed, with Tibo Javoy, the entire sound design for the European TV channel Arte. She co-wrote and co-produced, with Doriand, Emmanuelle Seigner's 2010 album Dingue.

She contributed to the soundtrack of the French film Thelma, Louise et Chantal (2010), directed by Benoît Pétré, including cover versions of French songs from the 1960s. She also contributed six songs to the Israeli film Yossi (2012), directed by Eytan Fox, as well as appearing onscreen as herself, performing a music concert.

After the 7 October 2023, she claimed in a long interview that "babies had their throat cut" during the Hamas attack and ask support of French artists to Jewish artists and Israel.

== Personal life ==
Keren Ann has Israeli, Dutch, and French citizenship. She is fluent in English, Hebrew, and French.

She married a Jewish man. She stated: "Being in tune with one's origins is important". In July 2012, Keren Ann gave birth to her first child, Nico.

== Discography ==
=== Studio albums ===
List of studio albums, with selected chart positions and certifications
| Title | Details | Peak chart positions | | | | | Certifications |
| Title | Details | BEL (WA) | FRA | SWI | UK | US Jazz | Certifications |
|---|---|---|---|---|---|---|---|
| La Biographie de Luka Philipsen | Released: 18 April 2000; Label: EMI; Formats: CD, digital download, streaming | — | 111 | — | — | — | |
| La Disparition | Released: 23 April 2002; Label: Capitol; Formats: CD, LP, digital download, streaming | — | 18 | — | — | — | |
| Not Going Anywhere | Released: 25 November 2003; Label: Capitol; Formats: CD, LP, digital download, streaming | 37 | 40 | — | — | — | |
| Nolita | Released: 11 November 2004; Label: Capitol; Formats: CD, digital download, streaming | 67 | 56 | — | — | — | |
| Keren Ann | Released: 23 April 2007; Label: Delabel, EMI; Formats: CD, digital download, streaming | 40 | 13 | 81 | 189 | 18 | SNEP: Silver |
| 101 | Released: 28 February 2011; Label: Delabel, EMI; Formats: CD, LP, digital download, streaming | 8 | 22 | 50 | — | — | |
| You're Gonna Get Love | Released: 25 March 2016; Label: Polydor, Yellow Tangerine; Formats: CD, LP, digital download, streaming | 26 | 27 | — | — | — | |
| Bleue | Released: 15 March 2019; Label: Polydor; Formats: CD, LP, digital download, streaming | 26 | 39 | 69 | — | — | |
| Keren Ann & Quatuor Debussy | Released: 11 February 2022; Label: Bring Back Music, Rain Dog; Formats: CD, LP, digital download, streaming | — | — | — | — | — | |
| Paris Amour | Released: 12 September 2025; Label: Bring Back Music; Formats: CD, LP, digital download, streaming | — | — | — | — | — | |
"—" denotes a recording that did not chart or was not released in that territory.

=== Collaborations and scores ===
- Chambre Avec Vue with Henri Salvador at Source-Virgin France (2000)
- Lady & Bird, with Bardi Johannsson at Labels (2003)
- Isis Project with Guy Chambers and Sophie Hunter at Sleeper Music UK (2004)
- ARTE New Sound with Tibo Javoy
- La Ballade of Lady & Bird with Icelandic Symphonic Orchestra at EMI
- Dingue for Emmanuelle Seigner with Doriand at Sony Music France
- Thelma, Louise et Chantal original score
- Red Waters, opera, with Bardi Johannsson (2011)
- "Soleil Bleu" / Sylvie Vartan @ Sony Music France (2011)

== TV soundtracks ==
- Grey's Anatomy ("Not Going Anywhere")
- SkyTeam advertisement ("Beautiful Day")
- Six Feet Under ("Jardin D'hiver")
- Big Love ("L'onde Amere")
- The L Word ("Do What I Do") (Lady & Bird)
- TGV advertisement ("Malmo Lives") (Lady & Bird)
- H&M advertisement ("Lay Your Head Down")
- Daewoo Motor Sales Iaan advertisement ("Right Now & Right Here")
- Orange advertisement ("Lay Your Head Down")
- Galia advertisement ("Right Now & Right Here")
- Nurse Jackie ("My Name is Trouble")
- Normal People ("Strange Weather")
- Baby Reindeer ("My Name is Trouble")
