= Alan Splet =

American sound designer and sound editor (1939–1994)

- Born: December 31, 1939; United States
- Died: December 2, 1994 (aged 54); Berkeley, California, U.S.
- Occupations: Sound designer and editor
- Spouse: Ann Kroeber

Alan Splet (December 31, 1939 – December 2, 1994) was an American sound designer and sound editor known for his collaborations with director David Lynch on Eraserhead, The Elephant Man, Dune, and Blue Velvet.

According to arts critic Richard B. Woodward, Splet "died much too young, left an audible signature on every film he touched, and should be remembered as an artist of stubborn integrity." Woodward notes that "no filmmaker in [the 1970s-80s] bonded more intensely or productively with Splet than David Lynch," and Lynch worked with Splet from 1970 until Splet's death in 1994.

Due to being legally blind, Splet rarely traveled and mainly worked from Berkeley, California. In 1980, he won an Oscar for his work on the film The Black Stallion. He did not attend the Academy Award ceremony because he was in London working on The Elephant Man; Oscar host Johnny Carson joked about his absence throughout the remainder of the telecast. He was later nominated for the Academy Award for Best Sound Mixing for Never Cry Wolf. In 1995, The Motion Picture Sound Editors union posthumously honored Splet with a Lifetime Achievement Award for his creative contributions to the field of cinema audio.

Splet was married to sound effects designer Ann Kroeber, and collaborated with her on most of his projects from 1979 until his death.

Early in his career, needing money to complete a film project, Lynch drew two ballpoint pen drawings and tried, unsuccessfully, to sell prints of them. Splet bought one of the original drawings and hung it in the house he shared "with his wife and fellow sonic explorer, Ann Kroeber." After Splet's death, when Kroeber was considering selling Lynch's drawing, she interviewed Lynch "about the background of the piece and his friendship with her husband." (An excerpt can be seen on YouTube.)

== Selected filmography ==
Year	Title	Director	Notes
1970	The Grandmother	David Lynch	Short film
1976	In the Region of Ice	Peter Werner	Sound design
1977	Eraserhead	David Lynch	See Eraserhead soundtrack
1978	Days of Heaven	Terrence Malick	Additional sound effects
1979	The Black Stallion	Carroll Ballard	Special Achievement Academy Award
1980	The Elephant Man	David Lynch	
1983	Never Cry Wolf	Carroll Ballard	Academy Award nomination
1984	Dune	David Lynch	
1986	Blue Velvet	David Lynch	
1986	The Mosquito Coast	Peter Weir	
1988	The Unbearable Lightness of Being	Philip Kaufman	
1988	Dirty Rotten Scoundrels	Frank Oz	
1989	Winter People	Ted Kotcheff	
1989	Weekend at Bernie's	Ted Kotcheff	
1989	Dead Poets Society	Peter Weir	
1990	Mountains of the Moon	Bob Rafelson	
1990	Henry & June	Philip Kaufman	
1991	Don't Tell Mom the Babysitter's Dead	Stephen Herek	
1991	At Play in the Fields of the Lord	Hector Babenco	
1992	Wind	Carroll Ballard	
1993	Rising Sun	Philip Kaufman	
1996	The English Patient	Anthony Minghella	Died during production; replaced by Walter Murch
