= Barði Jóhannsson =

Icelandic rock musician

- Born: 10 September 1975 (age 50)
- Origin: Iceland
- Genres: Rock; film
- Occupations: Musician; record producer
- Instruments: Electric guitar; acoustic guitar; electric bass; keyboards; vocals
- Years active: 1994–present
- Website: bardijohannsson.com

Barði Jóhannsson (born 10 September 1975) is an Icelandic musician, composer, writer, TV show host (of the surrealist Icelandic TV show Konfekt), clothing designer and film director. He is mostly known for his work with the groups Bang Gang, Lady & Bird (a project with Keren Ann) and Starwalker, a collaboration with Jean-Benoît Dunckel.

In addition to these musical outlets, Barði has been involved in a number of other audio-visual projects. Most significantly, he has written music for commercials and for the National Theatre of Iceland and Centre Dramatique d'Orleans (Museum of the Sea by Marie Darrieussecq). He has appeared at the Festival Aix En Provence and he co-produced and co-directed short films.

Barði has also written scores for movies and documentaries, such as Haxan (performed by the Bulgarian symphony orchestra) and Óskar Jónasson’s Reykjavík-Rotterdam (2009), which won Best Original Film Score at the Icelandic Edda Awards and was nominated for the Scandinavian Film Music Awards at Giff Film Festival (2010). He wrote the score for the film Would You Rather with Daniel Hunt, directed by David Guy Levy; and the score for the French film The Finishers directed by Nils Tavernier.

Barði has worked with many artists during his career. His co-writing credits include artists Keren Ann, Anthony Gonzales (M83), Jean-Benoît Dunckel (Air, Tomorrow's World), Daniel Hunt (Ladytron), Helen Marnie (Ladytron), Phoebe Killdeer (Nouvelle Vague), Sia Furler, Anggun and many more.

== Early life ==
Barði started playing music at a young age. He studied the piano and guitar and had a track included on a children's album. He met the singer and musician Esther Talia Casey in his teens. She became the lead singer on the first album of his most notorious band, Bang Gang. Barði and his friend Henrik Baldvin Björnsson started Bang Gang, initially making surf rock. Two years later, in 1996, Barði took the name for his own project.

== Bang Gang ==
Bang Gang is a musical project of Barði Jóhannsson formed in 1996.

== Lady & Bird ==
Lady & Bird is a collaboration between Keren Ann Zeidel and Barði Jóhannsson. They have released two albums and played special concerts with the Iceland Symphony Orchestra in Haskolabio (Reykjavík), Orchestre Lamoureux in Salle Pleyel (Paris) and a choir and harpist at the American Church in Paris. In 2011, Lady & Bird had a premier of their first opera, Red Waters, in the French opera house Opéra de Rouen Normandie.

== Starwalker ==
Starwalker is an electro-pop supergroup of the electro-pop icons Jean-Benoit Dunckel (Air, Tomorrow’s World) and the Icelandic composer Barði Jóhannsson (Bang Gang, Lady & Bird). The name Starwalker is an umbrella term for the duo’s work together. Their singles include "Bad Weather", "Blue Hawaii" and "Losers Can Win EP". A full-length self-titled album was released in April 2016.

== Discography ==
Albums

- You (Bang Gang) (1998)
- Something Wrong (Bang Gang) (2003)
- Lady & Bird (Lady & Bird) (2003)
- Strakarnir Okkar Original Motion Picture Score (Minusbardi) (2005)
- Häxan (Barði Jóhannsson) (2006)
- Ghosts from the Past (Bang Gang) (2008)
- La Ballade of Lady & Bird, A project by Keren Ann Zeidel & Barði Jóhannsson (2009)
- Selected Film & Theater Works Of Bardi Johannsson (Barði Jóhannsson) (2011)
- W Y R Original Motion Picture Score (Daniel Hunt & Barði Jóhannsson) (2013)
- Sacred Universe EP (Barði Jóhannsson) (2014)
- Losers Can Win EP (Starwalker) (2014)
- The Wolves Are Whispering (Bang Gang) (2015)

Singles

- "Sleep" - Bang Gang (1998)
- "So Alone" - Bang Gang (1998)
- "Sacred Things" - Bang Gang (2000)
- "Stop In The Name of Love" - Bang Gang (2003)
- "Find What You Get" - Bang Gang (2003)
- "I Know You Sleep" - Bang Gang (2008)
- "The World Is Gray" - Bang Gang (2008)
- "Bad Weather" - Starwalker (2013)
- "Blue Hawaii" - Starwalker (2014)
- "Out of Horizon" - Bang Gang (2015)
- "Silent Bite" - Bang Gang (2015)

Feature film soundtracks

- Fíaskó (Fiasco) by Ragnar Bragason (2000)
- Eleven Men Out (in collaboration with Minus) by Róbert Douglas (2005)
- Häxan (from 1920), by Benjamin Christiansen (2006) – New score for the silent movie
- Reykjavík-Rotterdam by Óskar Jónasson (2009) – Winner of the Icelandic Edda Film awards for the best original film score (2009) – Nomination for the Scandinavian Film Music Awards at Giff Film Festival (2010)
- Would You Rather (in collaboration with Daniel Hunt) by David Guy Levy (2012)
- De Toutes Nos Forces by Nils Tavernier (2013)

Music for documentaries

- Íslenska Sveitin (The Commander), by Kristinn Hrafnsson and Friðrik Guðmundsson (2004)
- Viets et Morts d’Andy Warhol by Jean Michel Vecchiet. Music by Lady & Bird (2005)
- Africa United by Olaf de Fleur Johannesson (2005)
- Heilabilun/Alzheimer by Lárus Ýmir Óskarsson (2006)
- Ama Dablam Beyond the void by Ingvar Ágúst Þórisson. In collaboration with Eberg (2008)
- Stelpurnar Okkar by Þóra Tómasdóttir (2009)
- The Still Point by Taki Bibelas (2009)

Music for TV series

- Pressa 3 (6 Episodes) by Óskar Jónasson. Score.
- Heimsendir by Ragnar Bragason. Score.
- Pressa 2 (6 Episodes) by Óskar Jónasson. Score.
- Réttur 1 (6 Episodes) by Sævar Guðmundsson. Score.
- Réttur 2 (6 Episodes) by Sævar Guðmundsson. Score.
- Skjár Einn, main theme.
- Silfur Egils, theme.
- Svínasúpan, theme.
- Strákarnir, theme.
- Ríkið, theme and score.
- Mannamál, theme.
- Kóngur um stund, theme and score.
- Fóstbræður, arrangements.
- Innlit útlit, theme.
- Pressa (6 Episodes) by Óskar Jónasson. Score in collaboration with Eberg.

Music for plays (as composer)

- Brennuvargarnir/Biederman and the Firebugs. The National Theater of Iceland. (2009)
- Sædýrasafnið – Museum of the Sea. The National Theater of Iceland & Centre Dramatique National Orleans. (2009)
- Hedda Gabbler. The National Theater of Iceland. (2011)
- Red Waters – An Opera Written by Lady & Bird (2011)

Short films

- Who is Barði? by Ragnar Bragason and Barði Jóhannsson (2003)
- Red Death by Taki Bibelas and Barði Jóhannsson, premiered in Centre Pompidou, Paris (2004)
- Sacred Universe by Jeaneen Lund and Barði Jóhannsson, premiered in Centre Pompidou at ASVOFF, Paris (2013)

Books

- Lady and Bird Recording Diary (2003) – Written by Barði Jóhannsson and Keren Ann Zeidel
- Maley Maley, Niðurfold (1999) – Written by Henrik B Björnsson and Barði Jóhannsson under a fake name

Other work

- Daily Radio Show, Radio-FM and X-FM for 2 years (2000)
- Konfekt – TV show (2001) – With Henrik B Björnsson
- Black Garden. Festival Aix Provance (2005) Music for a string quartet, clavier, and electronica
- Dressing Ourselves. Triennale in Milan (2005) Clothes design for the exhibition
- Epal. Designer Shop. (2005) Music for a children choir
- Dream by Barði og Noemi Brosset for the TV show The L Word (2007)

== See also ==
- List of Icelandic writers
- Icelandic literature
