= David Lynch filmography =

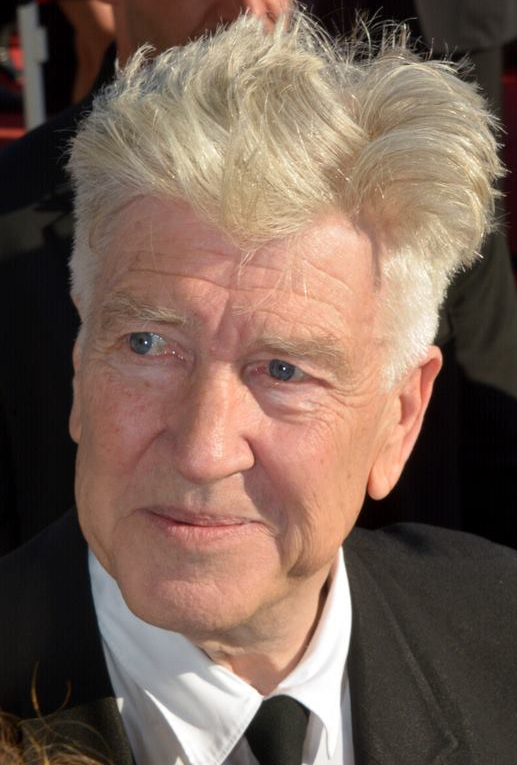
Lynch at the 2017 Cannes Film Festival

David Lynch (January 20, 1946 – January 16, 2025) was an American filmmaker, visual artist, musician and actor. Known for his surrealist films, he developed his own cinematic style which has been dubbed "Lynchian" and is characterized by its dream imagery and meticulous sound design. The surreal and, in many cases, violent elements to his films have earned them the reputation that they "disturb, offend or mystify" their audiences.

Lynch's oeuvre includes short and feature-length films, music videos, documentaries and television episodes, while his involvement in these ranged from direction, production, and screenwriting to acting and sound design. Lynch's first project was the 1967 short Six Men Getting Sick (Six Times), an animated film which blended elements of sculpture and painting into its animation.

His first feature-length project, 1977's Eraserhead, became a cult film and launched his commercial career. It also marked his first collaboration with Jack Nance, who would appear in many more of Lynch's productions until the death of the actor in 1996. Lynch's other feature films include the commercial flop Dune, and the critically successful The Elephant Man (1980), Blue Velvet (1986), The Straight Story (1999) and Mulholland Drive (2001), all of which went on to earn Academy Award nominations.

Lynch also branched out into television, and later, internet-based series. His first foray into television was Twin Peaks, a joint venture with Mark Frost which became a cult success, leading to Lynch and Frost working together on a number of other projects, including On the Air and American Chronicles.

In 2002, Lynch began producing two series of short films released through his official website: the Flash-animated DumbLand and Rabbits. Having begun acting in his 1972 short The Amputee, Lynch went on to appear on screen in Twin Peaks, Zelly and Me, and Dune. From 2010 to 2013, Lynch appeared in a recurring voice role in the animated series The Cleveland Show. He was a supporting actor in the 2017 John Carroll Lynch film Lucky.

== Feature film ==
Year	Title	Director	Writer	Producer	Sound Designer	Notes	Ref.
1977	Eraserhead	Yes	Yes	Yes	Yes	Also editor, composer, art director, and special effects	
1980	The Elephant Man	Yes	Yes	No	Yes	Co-written with Christopher De Vore and Eric Bergren	
1984	Dune	Yes	Yes	No	No		
1986	Blue Velvet	Yes	Yes	No	No		
1990	Wild at Heart	Yes	Yes	No	No		
1992	Twin Peaks: Fire Walk with Me	Yes	Yes	Executive	Yes	Co-written with Robert Engels	
1997	Lost Highway	Yes	Yes	No	Yes	Co-written with Barry Gifford	
1999	The Straight Story	Yes	No	No	Yes		
2001	Mulholland Drive	Yes	Yes	No	Yes		
2006	Inland Empire	Yes	Yes	Yes	Yes	Also editor, composer, cinematographer, camera operator, and construction team	

== Short film ==
Year	Title	Director	Writer	Producer	Actor	Notes	Ref(s)
1967	Six Men Getting Sick (Six Times)	Yes	Yes	Yes	No	Also animator	
1968	Absurd Encounter with Fear	Yes	Yes	No	No		
1968	Fictitious Anacin Commercial	Yes	Yes	No	No		
1968	Sailing with Bushnell Keeler	Yes	Yes	Yes	Yes		
1968	The Alphabet	Yes	Yes	No	No	Also editor, cinematographer, animator and sound	
1968	Early Experiments	Yes	Yes	Yes	Yes	16mm, from Lime Green DVD Set	
1970	The Grandmother	Yes	Yes	Yes	No	Also cinematographer, animator and sound effects	
1974	The Amputee	Yes	No	No	Yes	Role: Unable and scared nurse	
1988	The Cowboy and the Frenchman	Yes	Yes	No	No		
1995	Premonition Following an Evil Deed	Yes	No	No	No		
2001	Sunset #1	Yes	Yes	Yes	No		
2001	Head with Hammer	Yes	Yes	Yes	No		
2001	Where Are the Bananas?	Yes	Yes	Yes	No	Combined with Darkened Room on the DVD release but originally a separate video.	
2001	You're Not Supposed to Be Here	Yes	Yes	Yes	No		
2001	Pierre and Sonny Jim	Yes	Yes	Yes	Yes		
2001	Steam Chain/Factory Mask	Yes	Yes	Yes	No		
2001	Bees #1	Yes	Yes	Yes	No	Posted to YouTube in 2020 with alternate title, "Ball of Bees #1."	
2001	Dead Mouse with Ants	Yes	Yes	Yes	No		
2002	Coyote #1	Yes	Yes	Yes	No		
2002	Steps	Yes	Yes	Yes	No		
2002	Laura Palmer	Yes	Yes	Yes	No		
2002	The Pig Walks	Yes	Yes	Yes	No		
2002	The Short Films of David Lynch Easter Egg	Yes	Yes	Yes	Yes		
2002	BlueBob Egg	Yes	Yes	Yes	Yes		
2002	Lunch with Lynch Contest Announcement	Yes	Yes	Yes	Yes		
2002	Bees #2	Yes	Yes	Yes	No		
2002	Coyote #2	Yes	Yes	Yes	No		
2002	Kitchen Window	Yes	Yes	Yes	No		
2002	Lunch with Lynch Contest Drawing	Yes	Yes	Yes	Yes		
2002	Darkened Room	Yes	Yes	Yes	No	Also animator	
2002	Industrial Soundscape	Yes	No	No	No		
2002	The Disc of Sorrow Is Installed	Yes	Yes	Yes	Yes		
2002	Bees #3	Yes	Yes	Yes	No		
2003	Water Circus	Yes	Yes	Yes	No		
2003	Bees #4	Yes	Yes	Yes	No		
2003	Dining Room Window	Yes	Yes	Yes	No		
2003	Interior Dining Room	Yes	Yes	Yes	No		
2003	Lamp	Yes	No	No	Yes	Role: Himself	
2003	Boat	Yes	No	No	No	Also editor	
2004	Agave	Yes	Yes	Yes	No		
2004	Painted Lady	Yes	Yes	Yes	No		
2004	Bug Crawls	Yes	No	No	No		
2005	Scene from a David Lynch DV Project	Yes	Yes	Yes	No	For Avid promotional film	
2007	Intervalometer Experiments	Yes	No	No	No	Collection of Sunset #1, Steps, and Interior Dining Room.	
2007	Absurda	Yes	Yes	No	No		
2007	More Things That Happened	Yes	Yes	No	No	Also editor	
2007	Ballerina	Yes	No	No	No		
2007	David Lynch Cooks Quinoa	Yes	Yes	Yes	Yes		
2008	Twin Peaks festival greeting	Yes	No	No	No		
2010	Dream #7	Yes	No	No	No	Posted to YouTube in 2020 with the alternate title, The Mystery of the Seeing Hand.	
2010	Lady Blue Shanghai	Yes	Yes	No	No	Also editor and composer	
2011	The 3 Rs	Yes	Yes	No	No	Also editor and cinematographer	
2012	Memory Film	Yes	Yes	Yes	Yes	For Serpentine Gallery Memory Marathon	
2013	Idem Paris	Yes	No	No	No		
2015	Fire (Pożar)	Yes	Yes	Yes	No		
2017	What Did Jack Do?	Yes	Yes	No	Yes	Also editor Role: Detective	
2018	This Video of David Lynch Is Not What It Seems	Yes	Yes	Yes	Yes	For Omaze	
2018	Ant Head	Yes	Yes	Yes	No		
2018	Waiting for Mr. Lynch	Yes	Yes	Yes	Yes	For LEFFEST	
2020	The Story of a Small Bug	Yes	Yes	Yes	Yes	Role: Narrator at beginning Also editor	
2020	The Adventures of Alan R.	Yes	Yes	Yes	Yes		
2020	The Spider and the Bee	Yes	Yes	Yes	No		
2020	How Was Your Day Honey?	Yes	Yes	Yes	No		
2024	We'll Deliver 'Em	Yes	Yes	Yes	Yes	Role: Voice Actor	
2024	The Moon's Glow	Yes	Yes	Yes	Yes	Role: Voice Actor	
2024	Will There Be Anything Else?	Yes	Yes	Yes	Yes	Role: Voice Actor	

== Television ==
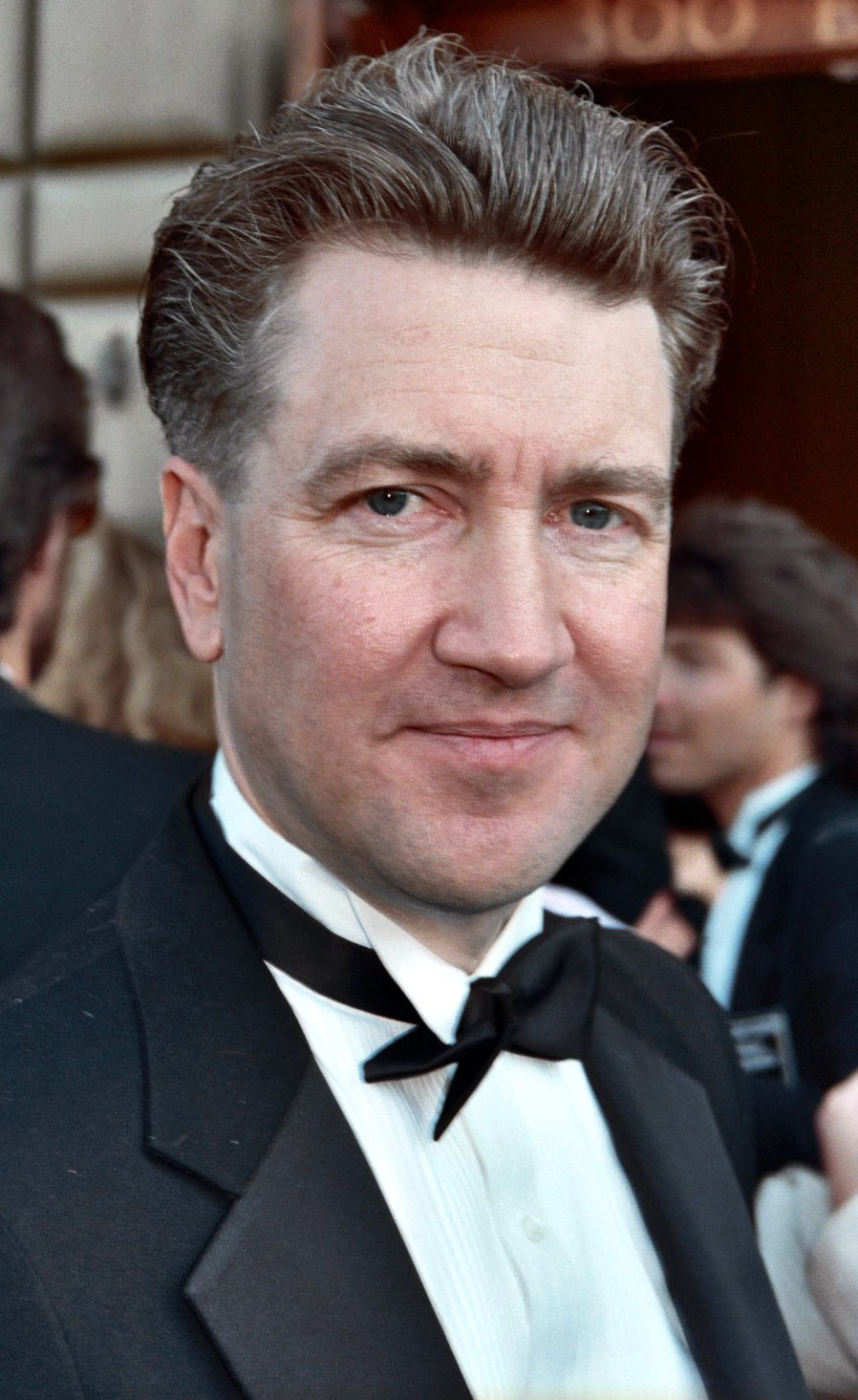
Twin Peaks earned several nominations at the 42nd Primetime Emmy Awards (Lynch pictured at the ceremony).

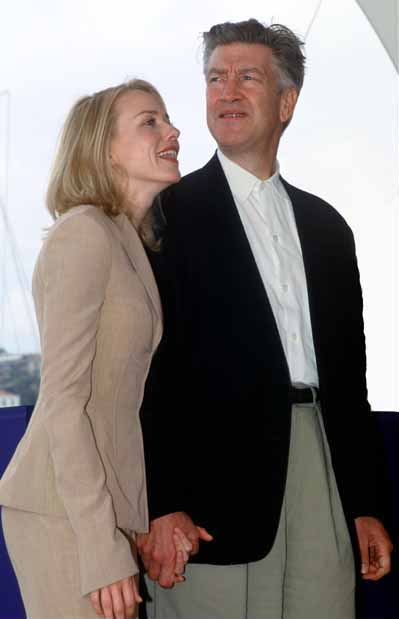
Lynch worked with Naomi Watts on several projects, including Mulholland Drive, Rabbits and Twin Peaks: The Return

Year	Title	Creator	Executive Producer	Director	Writer	Notes	Ref(s)
1990–1991	Twin Peaks	Yes	Yes	6 episodes	4 episodes	Co-created with Mark Frost	
1992	On the Air	Yes	Yes	1 episode	2 episodes	Co-created with Mark Frost	
1993	Hotel Room	Yes	Yes	2 episodes	No	Also sound designer, Co-created with Monty Montgomery	
2017	Twin Peaks: The Return	Yes	Yes	Yes	Yes	Also sound designer and additional editor, Co-created with Mark Frost	

== Web series ==
Year	Title	Director	Writer	Producer	Creator	Ref(s)
2002	DumbLand	Yes	Yes	Yes	Yes	
2002	Rabbits	Yes	Yes	Yes	Yes	
2002	Cannes Diary	Yes	Yes	Yes	Yes	
2002–2007	Out Yonder	Yes	Yes	Yes	Yes	
2005–2009; 2020–2022	Weather Reports	Yes	Yes	Yes	Yes	
2020–2022	What is David Working on Today?	Yes	Yes	Yes	Yes	
2020–2022	Today's Number Is...	Yes	Yes	Yes	Yes	

== Music videos ==
Year	Song	Musician	Ref(s)
1990	"Wicked Game"	Chris Isaak	
1992	"A Real Indication"	Thought Gang	
1995	"Longing"	X Japan	
1999	"Thank You, Judge"	BlueBob	
2009	"Shot in the Back of the Head"	Moby	
2010	"I Touch a Red Button Man"	Interpol	
2010	"Lion of Panjshir"	Ariana Delwari	
2012	"Crazy Clown Time"	David Lynch	
2013	"Came Back Haunted"	Nine Inch Nails	
2020	"I Have a Radio"	David Lynch	
2021	"I Am the Shaman"	Donovan	
2021	"Gimme Some a That"	Donovan	
2024	"Sublime Eternal Love"	Chrystabell & David Lynch	
2024	"The Answers to the Questions"	Chrystabell & David Lynch	

== Commercials ==
Year	Commercial Title	Subject	Ref(s)
1988	"F. Scott Fitzgerald", "Ernest Hemingway", "D.H. Lawrence", "Flaubert"	Obsession by Calvin Klein	
1991	"Mystery of G", "Cherry Pie", "Lost", "The Rescue"	Georgia Coffee	
1991	"We Care About New York"	New York City Department of Sanitation	
1991	Dangerous by Michael Jackson		
1992	"Who Is Gio?"	Gio by Armani	
1992	"Opium"	Opium by Yves Saint Laurent	
1993	Alka-Seltzer Plus		
1993	"Tresor"	Lancôme Tresor	
1993	Barilla Pasta		
1993	"Revealed"	American Cancer Society	
1993	"The Instinct of Life"	Background by Jil Sander	
1993	"The Wall"	Adidas	
1994	"Sun Moon Stars"	Sun Moon Stars by Lagerfield	
1997	"Dead Leaves", "Aunt Droid", "Nuclear Winter", "Rocket"	Sci-Fi Channel	
1997	Clearblue Easy		
1997	"Mountain Man"	Honda	
1998	"Parisienne People"	Parisienne	
1999	"Opium"	Opium by Yves Saint Laurent	
2000	"Welcome to the Third Place"	PlayStation 2	
2000	"Un matin partout dans le monde"	JCDecaux	
2002	"Do you speak Micra?"	Nissan Micra	
2002	"Bucking Bronco"	Citroën	
2004	"Fahrenheit"	Dior	
2004	"Preference"	L'Oreal	
2007	"Gucci"	Gucci	
2008	"Revital Granas"	Shiseido	
2011	"Doll Head"	David Lynch Signature Cup Coffee	
2012	"Oh Yeah"	David Lynch Signature Cup Coffee	
2014	Louboutin Rouge		

== Concert film ==
Year	Title	Director	Producer	Himself	Notes	Ref(s)
1990	Industrial Symphony No. 1	Yes	Yes	No	Also composer	
2011	Duran Duran: Unstaged	Yes	No	Yes		

== Other works ==
=== Acting roles ===
Film

Year	Title	Role	Notes	Ref(s)
1980	Heart Beat	Painter		
1980	The Elephant Man	Man in Bowler Hat in Mob Chasing Merrick	Uncredited extra	
1984	Dune	Spice Worker	Uncredited cameo	
1988	Zelly and Me	Willie		
1992	Twin Peaks: Fire Walk with Me	Gordon Cole		
1994	Nadja	Morgue Receptionist	Cameo	
1997	Lost Highway	Morgue Attendant	Deleted scene	
2006	Inland Empire	Bucky J	Uncredited voice	
2017	Girlfriend's Day	Narrator	Voice	
2017	Lucky	Howard		
2022	The Fabelmans	John Ford		

Short film

Year	Title	Notes	Ref(s)
2009	Soul Detective	Detective	
2009	Red Fish	The Knowledgeable One	
2017	The Black Ghiandola	Man in Black	

Television

Year	Title	Role	Notes	Ref(s)
1990–1991	Twin Peaks	Gordon Cole	6 episodes	
2002	DumbLand	All characters	Voice; 8 episodes	
2010–2013	The Cleveland Show	Gus the Bartender	Voice; 20 episodes	
2010, 2016	Family Guy	Gus the Bartender / Himself	Voice; episodes: "The Splendid Source" and "How the Griffin Stole Christmas"	
2012	Louie	Jack Dall	Episodes: "Late Show - Part 2 & 3"	
2017	Twin Peaks: The Return	Gordon Cole	11 episodes	
2020, 2022	Robot Chicken	Mad Scientist	Voice; episodes: "Endgame" and “May Cause Season 11 to End”	

=== Documentary films ===
Year	Title	Director	Producer	Himself	Ref(s)
1989	David Lynch: Don't Look at Me			Yes	
1990	Hollywood Mavericks			Yes	
1990	Jonathan Ross Presents for One Week Only			Yes	
1994	Crumb		Presenter		
1997	Pretty as a Picture: The Art of David Lynch			Yes	
2001	I Don't Know Jack			Yes	
2001	Eraserhead Stories	Yes		Yes	
2004	Dennis Hopper: The Decisive Moments			Yes	
2005	Midnight Movies: From the Margin to the Mainstream			Yes	
2007	Lynch			Yes	
2008	School of Thought			Yes	
2008	Sunshine Superman: The Journey of Donovan			Yes	
2009	Transcendendo Lynch			Yes	
2009	Great Directors			Yes	
2010	2012: Time for Change			Yes	
2011	Meditation Creativity Peace			Yes	
2012	Side by Side			Yes	
2012	Harry Dean Stanton: Partly Fiction			Yes	
2014	It's a Beautiful World			Yes	
2016	My Beautiful Broken Brain			Yes	
2016	David Lynch: The Art Life			Yes	
2016	Shadows of Paradise			Yes	
2021	Moby Doc			Yes	
2024	Beatles '64			Yes	
2025	I Know Catherine, the Log Lady			Yes	
2026	Mel Brooks: The 99 Year Old Man!			Yes	

=== Executive producer ===
Year	Title	Ref(s)
1991	The Cabinet of Dr. Ramirez	
1994	Nadja	
2008	Surveillance	
2009	My Son, My Son, What Have Ye Done	
2022	The Other Me	
2025	The Legend of the Happy Worker	

== See also ==
- David Lynch's unrealized projects
- List of accolades received by David Lynch

== Bibliography ==
- Barney, Richard A. (2009). David Lynch: Interviews. University Press of Mississippi. ISBN 9781604732368.
- Cozzolino, Robert (2014). David Lynch: The Unified Field. University of California Press. ISBN 9780520283961.
- Odell, Colin; Le Blanc, Michelle (2007). David Lynch. Kamera Books. ISBN 9781842432259.
- Rodley, Chris; Lynch, David (2005). Lynch on Lynch (2nd ed.). Macmillan. ISBN 0571220185.
