= List of accolades received by Blue Velvet =

Blue Velvet
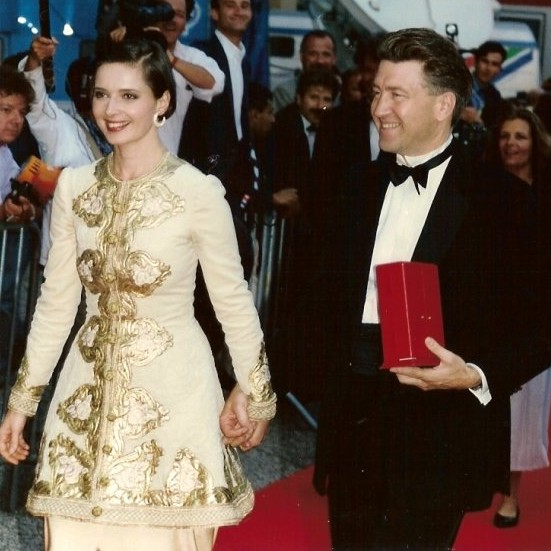
- Lynch and Rossellini at the Cannes Film Festival
Awards and nominations
Award	Wins	Nominations
Academy Award	0	1
Boston Society of Film Critics Awards	4	4
Golden Globe Award	0	2
Independent Spirit Awards	1	7
Los Angeles Film Critics Association Awards	2	2
Montreal World Film Festival	1	1
National Society of Film Critics Awards	4	4

Totals (Note: Certain award groups do not simply award one winner. They acknowledge several different recipients, have runners-up, and have third place. Since this is a specific recognition and is different from losing an award, runner-up mentions are considered wins in this award tally. For simplification and to avoid errors, each award in this list has been presumed to have had a prior nomination.)
- Wins: 12
- Nominations: 21

Blue Velvet is a 1986 American mystery film written and directed by David Lynch. The movie exhibits elements of both film noir and surrealism. The film features Kyle MacLachlan, Isabella Rossellini, Dennis Hopper, and Laura Dern. The title is taken from the 1963 Bobby Vinton song of the same name, which is featured in the film. Although initially detested by some mainstream critics, the film has now become widely acclaimed.

Blue Velvet was a critical success for Rossellini and Hopper, earning both several awards for their roles—Hopper's portrayal of the film's antagonist Frank Booth earned him six nominations with four wins, and Rossellini was successful in her Independent Spirit Awards nomination for Best Female Lead—while the film also earned Lynch his second Academy Award nomination for Best Director. As an example of a director casting against the norm, Blue Velvet is also noted for re-launching Hopper's career and for providing Rossellini with a dramatic outlet beyond the work as a fashion model and a cosmetics spokeswoman for which she had until then been known.

The film centers on college student Jeffrey Beaumont (MacLachlan), who, returning from a hospital visit to his ill father, discovers a human ear in a field in his hometown of Lumberton. He proceeds to investigate the ear with help from a high school student, Sandy Williams (Dern), who provides him with information and leads from her father, a local police detective. Jeffrey's investigation draws him deeper into his hometown's seedy underworld, and sees him forming a sexual relationship with the alluring torch singer, Dorothy Vallens (Rossellini), and uncovering psychotic criminal Frank Booth (Hopper), who engages in drug abuse, kidnapping, and sexual violence.

== Awards and nominations ==
Award	Year	Category	Nominee(s)	Result	Ref.
Academy Awards	1987	Best Director	David Lynch	Nominated	
Boston Society of Film Critics	1987	Best Film	Blue Velvet	Won	
Boston Society of Film Critics	1987	Best Director	David Lynch	Won (Note: Tied with Oliver Stone for Platoon)	
Boston Society of Film Critics	1987	Best Cinematography	Frederick Elmes	Won	
Boston Society of Film Critics	1987	Best Supporting Actor	Dennis Hopper	Won (Note: Tied with Ray Liotta for Something Wild)	
Golden Globe Awards	1987	Best Screenplay	David Lynch	Nominated	
Golden Globe Awards	1987	Best Supporting Actor	Dennis Hopper	Nominated	
Independent Spirit Awards	1987	Best Female Lead	Isabella Rossellini	Won	
Independent Spirit Awards	1987	Best Female Lead	Laura Dern	Nominated	
Independent Spirit Awards	1987	Best Director	David Lynch	Nominated	
Independent Spirit Awards	1987	Best Screenplay	David Lynch	Nominated	
Independent Spirit Awards	1987	Best Cinematography	Frederick Elmes	Nominated	
Independent Spirit Awards	1987	Best Male Lead	Dennis Hopper	Nominated	
Independent Spirit Awards	1987	Best Feature	Fred C. Caruso	Nominated	
Los Angeles Film Critics Association Awards	1987	Best Director	David Lynch	Won	
Los Angeles Film Critics Association Awards	1987	Best Supporting Actor	Dennis Hopper	Won	
Montreal World Film Festival	1986	Best Actor	Dennis Hopper	Won	
National Society of Film Critics Awards	1986	Best Film	Blue Velvet	Won	
National Society of Film Critics Awards	1986	Best Director	David Lynch	Won	
National Society of Film Critics Awards	1986	Best Supporting Actor	Dennis Hopper	Won	
National Society of Film Critics Awards	1986	Best Cinematography	Frederick Elmes	Won	
Sitges Film Festival	1986	Best Film	Blue Velvet	Won	

== Listicles ==
The film is recognized by the American Film Institute in the following lists:

- AFI's 100 Years...100 Thrills – #96
- AFI's 10 Top 10 – #8 Mystery Film
- AFI's 100 Years...100 Heroes & Villains: Frank Booth – #36 villain

== See also ==
- List of accolades received by David Lynch

== Footnotes ==
=== References ===
- Müller, Jürgen (2002). The 25 Greatest Films of the 1980s. Taschen Books. ISBN 3-8228-4783-6.
