= No Choice (2025 film) =

Independent film

- Directed by: Nate Hilgartner
- Written by: Nate Hilgartner
- Produced by: Shannon Semler; Nate Hilgartner; Steve Hilgartner; Kathleen O'Neil
- Starring: Hannah Deale; Jennifer Herzog; Robert Denzel Edwards; Hayden Frank; Maria Prudente; Adam Ratcliffe
- Cinematography: Alex Podolyanchùk
- Edited by: Daniel James
- Music by: Jonas Tarm
- Production company: Hilgartner Productions
- Distributed by: Indie Rights
- Release date: June 23, 2025
- Running time: 95 minutes
- Country: United States
- Language: English

No Choice is a 2025 American independent psychological horror social drama film written and directed by Nate Hilgartner in his directorial debut. The film stars Hannah Deale as Amy, a young woman living in rural poverty who becomes unexpectedly pregnant and starts having harrowing, prophetic dreams that she will die if she can't get an abortion.

The film was acquired by Indie Rights, which released No Choice in the United States on video-on-demand in March 2026.

The film responds to the U.S. Supreme Court's decision to overturn Roe v. Wade in June 2022. Its story dramatically explores how restrictive abortion laws would affect the most vulnerable members of already-struggling communities. Writing in Salon, actor Maria Prudente notes that the production team "could never have predicted just how quickly real-world headlines would not only validate our story, but outpace its darkest possibilities."

Critics have praised the actor's performances, surreal imagery blended with gritty realism, and sensitive handling of a controversial issue.

== Plot ==
Amy (Hannah Deale) lives in an unspecified U.S. state where abortion is restricted. She works in a convenience store and as a house cleaner, struggling to complete her education while supporting her opioid-addicted mother (Jennifer Herzog). Although Amy's days are monotonous and stressful, each night when she sleeps she has vivid dreams.

After one-night-stand with a handsome customer (Hayden Frank) ends in a broken condom, Amy's dreams take a sinister turn. Stymied by her boss (Adam Ratcliffe) and let down by her best friend (Robert Denzel Edwards), she obtains the morning-after pill too late.

After a positive test confirms her pregnancy, an increasingly desperate Amy seeks help from an emergency-room doctor (Maria Prudente). As her seemingly prophetic dreams grow more ominous, Amy struggles to escape a nightmare she can't wake up from.

== Cast ==
- Hannah Deale as Amy
- Jennifer Herzog as Debra
- Robert Denzel Edwards as Lucas
- Hayden Frank as Seth
- Maria Prudente as Dr. McAnnis
- Adam Ratcliffe as Randy

== Production ==
No Choice was filmed in and around Ithaca, New York. Local actors and Ithaca College student interns worked on the film. Remarking on the film's evident low budget, Jason Delgado of Film Threat writes that "the story and cast, and especially lead Hannah Deale, show the true power of independent film."

== Release ==
No Choice had its world premiere at Dances With Films on June 23, 2025, at TCL Chinese Theaters in Hollywood, California, taking home the festival's top award, the Grand Jury Prize for Narrative Feature.

The film had its international premiere at GASP! Horror Film Festival in Manchester, England on June 29, 2025. It was well received at the third annual Reproductive Rights Film Festival in Ithaca, New York. As part of Cine-Excess in Birmingham, United Kingdom, the film screened at the Birmingham Odeon on October 20, 2025, and was subsequently streamed internationally on October 24, 2025. Its official east coast premiere took place at Alexandria Film Festival in November 2025, where it won a Special Jury Prize recognizing the film's social impact.

No Choice had its New York City premiere at the Regal Union Square in January 2026 as part of Dances With Films NY.

Following its festival run, No Choice was acquired for streaming distribution by Indie Rights and became available to rent and buy on Amazon Prime Video on March 17, 2026.

The film also had a limited theatrical release at Cinemapolis in Ithaca, N.Y. in April 2026.

== Reception ==
Critics have praised No Choice for its handling of politically charged subject matter. Calling it "a necessary film to watch," Richard Propes of The Independent Critic praised Hilgartner for crafting "a ballsy, courageous, and vulnerable film about a real woman caught in a real nightmare." Noting the film's "scathing criticism of both the American healthcare system and the alarming state of reproductive rights of women," Sneha Jaiswal of Abstract AF! points out that No Choice also "refrains from vilifying men or assigning external blame, choosing to let Amy’s own perspective and resilience drive the story, allowing her internal struggle to take precedence."

Writing for Film Threat, Bobby LePire called Deale's performance "nothing short of stunning," and praised Hilgartner's direction as "a force to reckon with."

The film's extensive dream sequences have divided critics. To Jordon Searle of The Indiependent, the film "evokes shades of David Lynch" with sequences that "capture the strange, illogical qualities of dreams that only make sense when you wake up." Taking the opposite view, Luke Y. Thompson of Mortal Cinema found fault with dream sequences that "announce themselves stylistically, such that we know there isn't any real danger to them," in contrast to an authentically "Lynchian blurring of reality with dreamscapes".

The Hollywood Times's Valerie Milano called the film "a standout in this year’s festival lineup" and "a powerful reflection of our times." Liz Whittemore of Reel News Daily praised No Choice as "a stylish and hellish debut," "a creative deep dive into the psyche of desperation," and "essential art."

== Accolades ==
Following its world premiere at the 28th Dances With Films LA, No Choice was awarded the Grand Jury Prize for Narrative Feature, the festival's most prestigious award.

The film was also recognized by the Alexandria Film Festival with a Special Jury Prize recognizing the film's social impact.
