= List of accolades received by David Lynch =

David Lynch awards and nominations
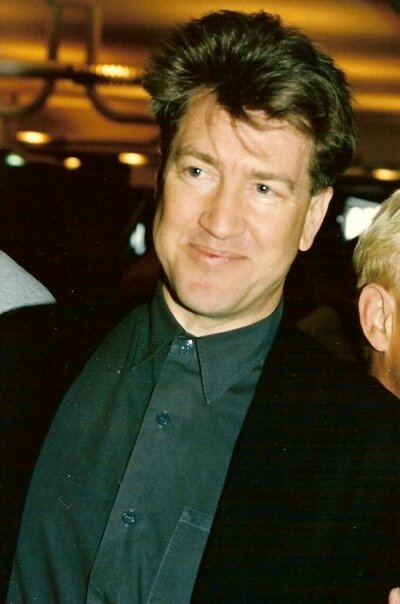
- Lynch at the 1990 Cannes Film Festival
Awards and nominations
Award	Wins	Nominations
Academy Awards	0	4
British Academy Film Awards	0	2
Emmy Awards	0	9
Golden Globe Awards	0	4
Screen Actors Guild Awards	0	1

Totals (Note: Certain award groups do not simply award one winner. They acknowledge several different recipients, have runners-up, and have third place. Since this is a specific recognition and is different from losing an award, runner-up mentions are considered wins in this award tally. For simplification and to avoid errors, each award in this list has been presumed to have had a prior nomination.)
- Wins: 25
- Nominations: 48

David Lynch (1946–2025) was an American filmmaker, visual artist, musician and actor. Known for his surrealist films, he developed his own unique cinematic style, which has been dubbed "Lynchian", and which is characterized by its dream imagery and meticulous sound design. Over his career he won the Honorary Academy Award, two prizes from the Cannes Film Festival and the Golden Lion for Lifetime Achievement in addition to nominations for two BAFTA Awards, nine Primetime Emmy Awards, four Golden Globe Awards, and a Screen Actors Guild Award.

Lynch's oeuvre encompasses work in both cinema and television. He received three nominations for the Academy Award for Best Director for his work on the biographical drama The Elephant Man (1980), for which he was also nominated for the Academy Award for Best Adapted Screenplay, the neo-noir Blue Velvet (1986), and his surrealist thriller Mulholland Drive (2001). He won the Cannes Film Festival's Palme d'Or for his romance film Wild at Heart (1990). He also directed the space opera Dune (1984), the surrealist crime drama Lost Highway (1997), the drama The Straight Story (1999), and the experimental thriller Inland Empire (2006).

Lynch whilst his television debut, with the ABC mystery-horror series Twin Peaks (1990–1991) which earned five Primetime Emmy Award nominations for its first season alongside a win for Golden Globe Award for Best Television Series – Drama. He was nominated for Outstanding Directing for a Drama Series and Outstanding Writing for a Drama Series. Lynch made a prequel film Twin Peaks: Fire Walk with Me (1992) and revival series Twin Peaks: The Return (2017). Indeed, the surreal and in many cases violent elements to his films have earned them the reputation that they "disturb, offend or mystify" their audiences.

In the course of his career, Lynch has received multiple awards and nominations. Amongst these are three Academy Award nominations for Best Director, and a nomination for Best Adapted Screenplay. He received the Academy Honorary Award from the Academy of Motion Picture Arts and Sciences in 2019. Lynch has twice won France's César Award for Best Foreign Film, as well as the Palme d'Or and Best Director Prizes at the Cannes Film Festival and the Golden Lion for Lifetime Achievement at the Venice Film Festival.

The French government has awarded him the Legion of Honour, the country's top civilian distinction, honoring him first as a Chevalier in 2002 and then as an Officier in 2009; Lynch was also awarded the key to the city of Bydgoszcz, Poland. In 2017, Lynch was awarded The Edward MacDowell Medal by The MacDowell Colony for outstanding contributions to American culture.

== Major associations ==
=== Academy Awards ===
Year	Category	Nominated work	Result	Ref.
1980	Best Adapted Screenplay	The Elephant Man	Nominated	
1980	Best Director	The Elephant Man	Nominated	
1986	Best Director	Blue Velvet	Nominated	
2001	Best Director	Mulholland Drive	Nominated	
2019	Academy Honorary Award	—N/a	Honored	

=== BAFTA Awards ===
Year	Category	Nominated work	Result	Ref.
1981	Best Direction	The Elephant Man	Nominated	
1981	Best Screenplay	The Elephant Man	Nominated	

=== Emmy Awards ===
Year	Category	Nominated work	Result	Ref.
1990	Outstanding Drama Series	Twin Peaks (season one)	Nominated	
1990	Outstanding Directing in a Drama Series	Twin Peaks (season one)	Nominated	
1990	Outstanding Writing for a Drama Series	Twin Peaks (season one)	Nominated	
1990	Outstanding Achievement in Main Title Theme Music	Twin Peaks (season one)	Nominated	
1990	Outstanding Achievement in Music and Lyrics	Twin Peaks (season one)	Nominated	
2018	Outstanding Directing for a Limited Series or Movie	Twin Peaks: The Return	Nominated	
2018	Outstanding Writing for a Limited Series or Movie	Twin Peaks: The Return	Nominated	
2018	Outstanding Single-Camera Editing for a Limited Series	Twin Peaks: The Return	Nominated	
2018	Outstanding Sound Editing for a Limited Series or Movie	Twin Peaks: The Return	Nominated	

=== Golden Globe Awards ===
Year	Category	Nominated work	Result	Ref.
1980	Best Director	The Elephant Man	Nominated	
1986	Best Screenplay	Blue Velvet	Nominated	
1990	Best Television Series – Drama	Twin Peaks	Won	
2001	Best Director	Mulholland Drive	Nominated	
2001	Best Screenplay	Mulholland Drive	Nominated	

== Guild awards ==
=== Directors Guild Awards ===
Year	Category	Nominated work	Result	Ref.
1980	Outstanding Directorial Achievement in Theatrical Film	The Elephant Man	Nominated	

=== Writers Guild Awards ===
Year	Category	Nominated work	Result	Ref.
1980	Best Drama Adapted from Other Medium	The Elephant Man	Nominated	
1986	Best Original Screenplay	Blue Velvet	Nominated	

=== Screen Actors Guild Awards ===
Year	Category	Nominated work	Result	Ref.
2023	Outstanding Performance by a Cast in a Motion Picture	The Fabelmans (shared with the cast (Note: Jeannie Berlin, Paul Dano, Judd Hirsch, Gabriel LaBelle, Seth Rogen and Michelle Williams))	Nominated	

== Major festival awards ==
=== Cannes Film Festival ===
Year	Category	Project	Result	Ref.
1990	Palme d'Or	Wild at Heart	Won	
1992	Palme d'Or	Twin Peaks: Fire Walk with Me	Nominated	
1999	Palme d'Or	The Straight Story	Nominated	
2001	Palme d'Or	Mulholland Drive	Nominated	
2001	Best Director	Mulholland Drive	Won	

=== Venice Film Festival ===
Year	Category	Project	Result	Ref.
2006	Future Film Festival Digital Award	Inland Empire	Won	
2006	Golden Lion for Lifetime Achievement	—N/a	Honored	

== Industry awards ==
Year	Association	Category	Project	Result	Ref.
1982	César Awards	Best Foreign Film	The Elephant Man	Won	
2002	César Awards	Best Foreign Film	Mulholland Drive	Won	
2018	Dorian Awards	TV Drama of the Year	Twin Peaks: The Return	Nominated	
1999	European Film Awards	Best Non-European Film	The Straight Story	Won	
2018	Golden Reel Awards	Outstanding Sound Editing – Episodic Short Form	Twin Peaks: The Return	Nominated	
1987	Independent Spirit Awards	Best Director	Blue Velvet	Nominated	
1987	Independent Spirit Awards	Best Screenplay	Blue Velvet	Nominated	
2000	Independent Spirit Awards	Best Director	The Straight Story	Nominated	
2007	Independent Spirit Awards	Special Distinction Award (Won with Laura Dern)		Won	
1993	Saturn Awards	Best Writing	Twin Peaks: Fire Walk with Me	Nominated	
2018	Saturn Awards	Best Guest Performance in a Television Series	Twin Peaks: The Return	Won	

== Critics awards ==
Year	Association	Category	Project	Result	Ref.
2002	American Film Institute	Best Director	Mulholland Drive	Nominated	
1986	Boston Society of Film Critics	Best Director	Blue Velvet	Won	
2002	Boston Society of Film Critics	Best Director	Mulholland Drive	Won	
2001	Chicago Film Critics Association	Best Director	Mulholland Drive	Won	
1986	Los Angeles Film Critics Association	Best Director	Blue Velvet	Won	
2001	Los Angeles Film Critics Association	Best Director	Mulholland Drive	Won	
1986	National Society of Film Critics	Best Director	Blue Velvet	Won	
2006	National Society of Film Critics	Best Experimental Film	Inland Empire	Won	
2001	Toronto Film Critics Association	Best Director	Mulholland Drive	Won	

== Honorary awards ==
Year	Association	Award	Result	Ref.
1991	American Film Institute	Schnaffer Alumni Medal	Won	
2000	Camerimage	Award for the Director with Special Visual Sensitivity	Won	
2000	Camerimage	Award for Director–Cinematographer Duo (Won with Frederick Elmes)	Won	
2003	Camerimage	Order for the Contribution to Polish Culture	Won	
2012	Camerimage	Lifetime Achievement Award	Won	
2003	Stockholm Film Festival	Lifetime Achievement Award	Won	

== Awards and nominations received by Lynch's films ==
Year	Title	Academy Awards		BAFTA Awards		Golden Globe Awards	
Year	Title	Nominations	Wins	Nominations	Wins	Nominations	Wins
1980	The Elephant Man	8		7	3	4	
1984	Dune	1					
1986	Blue Velvet	1				2	
1990	Wild at Heart	1		1		1	
1999	The Straight Story	1				2	
2001	Mulholland Drive	1		2	1	4	
Total		15		10	4	15	

== Special honors ==
Lynch has also been honored by the French government with induction into the Legion of Honour, first being honored as a Chevalier (knight) in 2002, and again as an Officier (officer) in 2009. In 2012, Lynch was presented with the key to the city of Bydgoszcz, Poland, by the city's mayor Rafał Bruski. The presentation was part of that year's Plus Camerimage festival.

== Directed Academy Award performances ==
=== Academy Awards ===
Under Lynch's direction, these actors have received Academy Award nominations for their performances in their respective roles.

Year	Performer	Film	Result
Academy Award for Best Actor
1980	John Hurt	The Elephant Man	Nominated
1999	Richard Farnsworth	The Straight Story	Nominated
Academy Award for Best Supporting Actress
1990	Diane Ladd	Wild at Heart	Nominated

=== BAFTA Awards ===
Directed BAFTA performances Under Lynch's direction, these actors have received BAFTA nominations for their performances in their respective roles.

Year	Performer	Film	Result
BAFTA Award for Best Actor in a Leading Role
1980	John Hurt	The Elephant Man	Won

=== Emmy Awards ===
Directed Emmy Award performances Under Lynch's direction, these actors have received Emmy Award nominations for their performances in their respective roles.

Year	Performer	Film	Result
Primetime Emmy Award for Outstanding Lead Actor in a Drama Series
1990	Kyle MacLachlan	Twin Peaks (season one)	Nominated
1991	Kyle MacLachlan	Twin Peaks (season two)	Nominated
Primetime Emmy Award for Outstanding Lead Actress in a Drama Series
1990	Piper Laurie	Twin Peaks (season one)	Nominated
Primetime Emmy Award for Outstanding Supporting Actress in a Drama Series
1990	Sherilyn Fenn	Twin Peaks (season one)	Nominated
1991	Piper Laurie	Twin Peaks (season two)	Nominated

=== Golden Globes ===
Directed Golden Globe Award performances Under Lynch's direction, these actors have received Golden Globe Award nominations for their performances in their respective roles.

Year	Performer	Film	Result
Golden Globe Award for Best Actor in a Motion Picture – Drama
1980	John Hurt	The Elephant Man	Nominated
1999	Richard Farnsworth	The Straight Story	Nominated
Golden Globe Award for Best Supporting Actor – Motion Picture
1986	Dennis Hopper	Blue Velvet	Nominated
Golden Globe Award for Best Supporting Actress – Motion Picture
1990	Diane Ladd	Wild at Heart	Nominated
Golden Globe Award for Best Actor – Television Series Drama
1990	Kyle MacLachlan	Twin Peaks	Won
Golden Globe Award for Best Supporting Actress – Series, Miniseries or Television Film
1990	Piper Laurie	Twin Peaks	Won
1990	Sherilyn Fenn	Twin Peaks	Nominated
Golden Globe Award for Best Actor – Miniseries or Television Film
2017	Kyle MacLachlan	Twin Peaks: The Return	Nominated
