= The Short Films of David Lynch =

Collection of short films

The Short Films of David Lynch (2002) is a DVD collection of the early student and commissioned film work of American filmmaker David Lynch. As such, the collection does not include Lynch's later short works, which are listed in the filmography.

The DVD contains introductions by Lynch to each film.

== Six Figures Getting Sick (Six Times) ==
Six Men Getting Sick (Six Times) (1967, 1 minute). Originally untitled, "Six Men Getting Sick" is a one-minute color animated film that consists of six loops shown on a sculptured screen of three human-shaped figures (based on casts of Lynch's own head as done by Jack Fisk) that intentionally distorted the film. Lynch's animation depicted six people getting sick: their stomachs grew and their heads would catch fire.

Lynch made this film during his second year at the Pennsylvania Academy of Fine Art. The school held an experimental painting and sculpture exhibit every year and Lynch entered his work in the Spring of 1966. The animated film was shown on "an Erector-set rig on top of the projector so that it would take the finished film through the projector, way up to the ceiling and then back down, so the film would keep going continuously in a loop. And then I hung the sculptured screen and moved the projector back till just what I wanted was on the screen and the rest fell back far enough to disappear" (Chris Rodley, editor of Lynch on Lynch). Lynch showed the whole thing with the sound of a siren as accompaniment. The film cost $200 and was not intended to have any successors. It was merely an experiment on Lynch's part because he wanted to see his paintings move.

== The Alphabet ==
The Alphabet (1968, 4 minutes) was made for the Pennsylvania Academy of Fine Arts, and combines animation and live action. It has a simple narrative structure relating a symbolically rendered expression of a fear of learning.

The idea for The Alphabet came from Lynch's wife, Peggy Lentz, a painter whose niece, according to Lynch in Chris Rodley's Lynch on Lynch book, "was having a bad dream one night and was saying the alphabet in her sleep in a tormented way. So that's sort of what started The Alphabet going." Based on the merits of this short film, Lynch was awarded an American Film Institute production.

In 2023, MovieWeb ranked The Alphabet as the 9th creepiest short horror film of all time, writing that the film captures "Lynch's unique talent for crafting an atmosphere of absolute dread".

== The Grandmother ==
The Grandmother (1970, 33 minutes). After the success of The Alphabet, one of Lynch's friends, Bushnell Keeler, recommended that he check out the American Film Institute. Keeler's brother-in-law had been involved in setting up the AFI. Lynch submitted The Alphabet, and wrote a script for a short film entitled The Grandmother. He sent the script and a print of The Alphabet to the AFI in Washington. Lynch got a call from George Stevens Jr. and Tony Vellani at the AFI, who wanted to know if Lynch could make The Grandmother for $5,000 (it eventually cost $7,200).

The short film combines live action and animation. The story revolves around a boy who grows a grandmother to escape neglect and abuse from his parents. It is mostly silent with only occasional vocal outbursts of gibberish and soundtrack cues used to convey story.

The music in the film was provided by a local group known as Tractor, and marked the first time Lynch would work with Alan Splet, who was recommended to the filmmaker by the soundman of The Alphabet. Initially, Lynch and Splet intended to use a collection of sound effects records for the film, but after going through them all they found that none of them were useful. So, Lynch and Splet took sixty-three days to make and record their own sound effects.

After finishing The Grandmother, Lynch took the film to be shown at the AFI in Washington, D.C. The head of the AFI at the time, George Stevens Jr., found that after all the films had been categorized, only Lynch's defied easy categorization. Stevens and Vellani recommended that Lynch apply to the AFI's Center for Advanced Film Studies. This was a filmmaking conservatory that Vellani had recently started in Beverly Hills. Lynch and Splet both applied for scholarships, and on the strength of The Grandmother (which won awards at film festivals in Atlanta, Bellevue and San Francisco), they were accepted into the program.

== The Amputee ==
The Amputee (1974, 4 and 5 minute versions) was made for the American Film Institute while Eraserhead was in financial limbo. The AFI was testing two different stocks of black and white video, and enlisted Frederick Elmes to test each one. Lynch asked Elmes if he could shoot something with this stock, and he allowed him, so Lynch and Catherine Coulson stayed up all night writing the script. The result was a one shot scene with Catherine Coulson about a woman attempting to write a letter while a nurse (played by Lynch) tends to her leg stumps. It exists in two versions: one, 4 minutes and 50 seconds; the other 4 minutes and 4 seconds.

== The Cowboy and the Frenchman ==
The Cowboy and the Frenchman (1988, 26 minutes) is slapstick, made for French television as part of the series The French as Seen by... by French magazine Figaro. It stars Harry Dean Stanton, Frederic Golchan, Michael Horse, Tracey Walter, and Jack Nance.

== Premonitions Following an Evil Deed ==
Lumière: Premonitions Following an Evil Deed (1996, 52 seconds) was originally included as a segment in the 1995 film Lumière et compagnie. Forty acclaimed directors created works using the original Cinematographe invented by the Lumière brothers. In five shots, Lynch's film depicts a woman having troubled thoughts as police discover a body.

== See also ==
- Lists of David Lynch's web series, TV film episodes, and other works

== Bibliography ==
- Lynch, David and Rodley, Chris (2005). Lynch on Lynch (revised ed.). New York: Faber and Faber. ISBN 978-0-571-22018-2.
