= Meatballs 4 =

1992 film by Bob Logan

- Theatrical release poster
- Directed by: Bob Logan
- Written by: Bob Logan
- Produced by: Donald P. Borchers; Ken Halloway; Kris Krengel
- Starring: Corey Feldman; Jack Nance; Sarah Douglas; Bojesse Christopher
- Cinematography: Vance Burberry
- Edited by: Peter H. Verity
- Music by: Steve Hunter
- Distributed by: Moviestore Entertainment
- Release date: March 6, 1992
- Running time: 84 minutes
- Countries: United States; Canada
- Language: English

Meatballs 4 (also known as Meatballs 4: To the Rescue) is a 1992 comedy film and the fourth and final installment in the Meatballs series of films. It was shot in its entirety at Bass Lake, California, starting in the late summer of 1991. Originally conceived as a comedy-drama titled Happy Campers, the project was retooled after production had begun to be part of the Meatballs series.

== Plot ==
Ricky Wade is the hottest waterskiing instructor around, and he has just been rehired by his former employer/camp to whip up attendance. However, the camp is in serious financial trouble and the owner of a rival, more popular, camp wants to buy them out. Thus, the two camps engage in a winner-take-all competition that will settle the rivalry once and for all.

== Cast ==
- Corey Feldman as Ricky Wade
- Sarah Douglas as Monica Shavetts
- Jack Nance as Neil Peterson
- Steven M. Bradley as Nelson Beyers, Ski Judge
- Bojesse Christopher as Wes Ford
- Brad Grunberg as Victor "Johnny Cocktails" Thigpen
- J. Trevor Edmond as Howie Duncan
- Paige French as Jennifer Lipton
- John Mendoza as Dick
- Bentley Mitchum as Kyle Linck
- Deborah Tucker as Kelly Peterson
- Frank Walton as Nunzio
- Cristy Thom as Hillary
- Brian Christensen as Michael Peltz
- Jojo Farkas as Bus Driver
- Monique de Lacy as Lovelie #1
- Neriah Davis as Nariah

== Production ==
During filming in November 1991, Jack Nance's wife Kelly Jean Van Dyke died by suicide. He left the production to return to Los Angeles and returned to filming five days after her ashes were scattered.
