= Repossessed (film) =

1990 film by Bob Logan

- Theatrical release poster
- Directed by: Bob Logan
- Written by: Bob Logan
- Produced by: Steve Wizan
- Starring: Linda Blair; Ned Beatty; Leslie Nielsen; Anthony Starke
- Cinematography: Michael D. Margulies
- Edited by: Jeff Freeman
- Music by: Charles Fox
- Production company: Carolco Pictures
- Distributed by: Seven Arts; New Line Cinema
- Release date: September 14, 1990
- Running time: 80 minutes
- Country: United States
- Language: English
- Box office: $1.4 million

Repossessed is a 1990 American comedy horror film written and directed by Bob Logan, and starring Linda Blair, Leslie Nielsen, Ned Beatty and Anthony Starke. A parody of The Exorcist (1973), in which Blair had previously starred, the film follows Nancy Aglet, a woman who becomes possessed for the second time in her life while viewing a prosperity gospel television program. The film features numerous gags based on The Exorcist, such as the green-vomit and head-spinning scenes, and real-life events such as the televangelist scandals of the 1980s.

== Plot ==
In 1973, Father Jedediah Mayii casts out the devil from the body of young Nancy Aglet. In 1990, Nancy's body is possessed once again, while watching The Ernest and Fanny Miracle Hour, a prosperity gospel broadcast by hucksters Ernest and Fanny Ray Weller.

After a visit to the hospital, and a visit from Father Luke Brophy, Brophy concludes that Nancy is indeed possessed. Mayii, however, refuses to perform the exorcism, claiming he is too weak, and that both he and Nancy barely survived her previous exorcism. Brophy visits the Supreme Council for Exorcism Granting. Ernest and Fanny are also present and Ernest concludes that an exorcism is warranted, convincing the council to televise Nancy's exorcism. They agree, believing it will convert millions, so Ernest presents Ernest and Fanny's Exorcism Tonight to the network.

Feeling he may be needed, Mayii visits Bods-R-Us, a gymnasium, to restore his physical strength. There, Brophy approaches him, informs him of the televised exorcism, and attempts once more to convince Mayii to conduct the exorcism. He refuses again.

After a series of attempts to free Nancy's body using phone donations, song, and insults, Ernest and Fanny's Exorcism Tonight is announced as having the largest audience in history. Upon hearing this, the devil, in Nancy's body, sets the studio on fire, causing the audience to flee. He reveals to Ernest and Fanny that he used them to get the largest audience, and turns them into a pantomime horse.

Using the camera, the devil tries to claim the souls of the viewing audience, but is stopped by Brophy, who destroys the camera. The devil announces he knows another way to claim their souls, and runs away, heading for a satellite transmitter. He is pursued by religious figures from around the world, who have gathered at Brophy's command. Brophy teases the devil about his earlier defeat by Mayii.

Back in the studio, the devil uses the camera to lure Mayii to him for a rematch. The exorcism, with commentary by "Mean Gene" Okerlund and Jesse "The Body" Ventura, is ineffective until the devil mentions that he hates rock 'n roll. Turning the TV studio into a live concert, the song "Devil with a Blue Dress On" is played to the devil by the various religious figures, including Pope John Paul II on guitar. The devil is tormented so much that he is finally driven from Nancy's body for good.

== Cast ==
- Linda Blair as Nancy Velsmo Aglet
- Ned Beatty as Ernest Weller
- Leslie Nielsen as Father Jedediah Mayii
- Anthony Starke as Father Luke Brophy
- Thom J. Sharp as Braydon Aglet
- Lana Schwab as Fanny Ray Weller
- Benj Thall as Ned Aglet
- Melissa Moore as Student
- Willie Garson as Nerd
- Murray Langston as Driver
- Barbara Alyn Woods as Elevator Woman
- Robert Fuller as Dr. Hackett
- John Ingle as Father Crosby
- Bryan O'Byrne as Father Stills
- Doug Draizin as Fred Tartastein
- Jake Steinfeld as Himself
- Army Archerd as Himself
- Frazer Smith as Announcer
- Jack LaLanne as Himself
- Joseph V. Perry as Special Effects Man
- Wally George as Himself
- Floyd Levine as Frank Lot
- Gene Greytak as Pope John Paul II
- Bob Zany as Tour Guest
- Jesse Ventura as Himself
- Gene Okerlund as Himself

== Production ==
Linda Blair agreed to appear in the film under the request that Leslie Nielsen star opposite her as Father Jebediah Mayii, the priest in the film. "Bob Logan talked me into doing a spoof of The Exorcist because he knew I wanted to lay that image to rest," Blair said. "I didn’t want to do it until Carolco (a production company) called and asked me what it would take for me to do the film. Bob promised we could do it like The Naked Gun and Airplane!. But I would agree only if they got (Naked Gun star) Leslie Nielsen for the priest. They contacted Leslie, who thought the script was hilarious." During the film's production, producer Steve Wizan denied that the film was an outright parody of The Exorcist, stating: "It’s not an Exorcist spoof. We’re sending up all horror pictures."

== Release ==
The film received a limited theatrical release in the United States through New Line Cinema's Seven Arts division on September 14, 1990, one month after the release of The Exorcist III.

=== Home media ===
The film was released on VHS and LaserDisc by LIVE Home Video in 1990. In 2003, Artisan Entertainment released the film on DVD. The film was re-released on DVD on April 14, 2009, by Lionsgate Home Entertainment, in a collection of forgotten films called the Lost Collection. Lionsgate again released the film on DVD on January 4, 2011, in a 4-Film Collection set along with My Best Friend Is a Vampire, Slaughter High and Silent Night, Deadly Night 3: Better Watch Out! The film was remastered and re-released in 4K on Blu-ray in 2024 and 2025 by Kino Lorber in Germany and the United States respectively.

== Reception ==
=== Box office ===
Repossessed earned $266,975 during its opening weekend in 115 theaters. It eventually went on to gross a total of $1,382,462 in the United States.

=== Critical response ===
One positive review came from Mick Martin and Marsha Porter's DVD and Video Guide, where they called it an "uproarious parody" and praising Leslie Nielsen's performance.

The film otherwise received largely negative reviews upon its theatrical release and subsequent home media releases. Michael Wilmington of the Los Angeles Times panned the film, writing: "Is this a bad movie? Is the sky blue? Short of repeating all 237 or so of its incredibly limp jokes there’s no way to convey how completely Repossessed goes awry. On and on they come, endlessly: like a blizzard of stale pork rinds." Craig MacInnes of the Toronto Star called the film a "fitful locker room farce" that "delights in trotting out a bevy of naked women with pendulous breasts and happily indulges in vicious sexist remarks that seek immunity in the name of parody." However, he praised Linda Blair's performance and the work of the special effects crew, remarking that the latter "actually made Blair look as scary and repugnant and possessed as she did in [The Exorcist]. If only she had turned her hell’s-belle fury on-the movie’s hapless writers." Leonard Maltin gave the film one-and-a-half stars out of four and remarked that it has "too few gags, too many targets, and a poor finale" but noted that "Blair and Nielsen are good."

On the review aggregator website Rotten Tomatoes, 11% of 9 critics' reviews are positive. The film won the Golden Raspberry Award for Worst Original Song, for the song "He's Comin' Back (The Devil!)" at the 11th Golden Raspberry Awards.

== Soundtrack ==
No.	Title	Writer(s)	Provided by	Length
1.	"Devil with the Blue Dress On" (Performed by Nicholas O'Har)	William Stevenson and Frederick Long	Published by Stone Agate Music (A div. of Jobete Music Co., Inc.) (BMI)
2.	"Repossessed" (Performed by Cindy Valentine)	Charles Fox and Cindy Valentine	Published by Anabasis Music (BMI) and Another Level Music (BMI)
3.	"Pump Up the Jam" (Performed by J.T. Welden & R.D. Welden)	Manuela Kamosi and Thomas De Quincey	Courtesy of Colgems-EMI Music, Inc. (ASCAP) on behalf of BMC Publishing and Bogam Publishing
4.	"Chasin' the Devil"	Doug Livingston (music), Marie Cain (lyrics)	Published by Anabasis Music (BMI) and Raisin Music (ASCAP)
5.	"He's Coming Back" (Performed by Chris LeVrar)	Chris LeVrar	Produced by Afrika Islam Published by Anabasis Music (BMI)

== Sources ==
- Maltin, Leonard (2009). Leonard Maltin's Movie Guide. New York City, New York: Signet Books. ISBN 978-0-452-29557-5.
- Martin, Mick; Porter, Marsha (2003). DVD and Video Guide 2004. New York City, New York: Ballantine Books. ISBN 978-0-452-29557-5.
