= Richard Green (American actor) =

American actor, voice actor, director and musician

- Occupations: Actor, director, musician
- Years active: 1984–present

Richard Green is an American actor, director and musician.

Green appeared as the Magician in David Lynch's Mulholland Drive and produced I Don't Know Jack, about the life and death of Eraserhead star Jack Nance. His feature directorial debut was for the film 7 Year ZigZag (told entirely in rhyme and original swing and jazz). Green has also had a substantial voice acting career, with his roles including Hugo Strange in The Batman and guest roles in Justice League, Batman: The Brave and the Bold, and Ben 10.

Green is also a singer-songwriter, with two albums and the feature film 7 Year ZigZag to his credit. His songs appeared in Burn Hollywood Burn and Strangers in Paradise. His credits as an actor include The West Wing.

His production company Next Step Studios has produced commercial shorts as well as two feature films and the development of The Video Biography Company.

Green received his BFA in acting from California Institute of the Arts (Theater BFA 77).

== Filmography ==
=== Film ===
Year	Title	Role	Notes
1984	Strangers in Paradise	M.C.	
1987	Timesweep	Jeremy Weller	Direct-to-video; Credited as Richard Greene
1987	In Self Defense		Television film
1987	The Price of Life	Gambler	Short
1988	Street of Dreams		Television film
1988	Shootdown	Radio Host	Television film
1989	One Man Force	Jacobowitz	
1992	Her Final Fury: Betty Broderick, the Last Chapter	Reporter	Television film
2001	Scooby-Doo and the Cyber Chase	Moon Goon	Voice, direct-to-video
2001	Mulholland Drive	The Magician	
2003	7 Year Zig Zag		Also director, writer, executive producer, and composer
2005	The Batman vs. Dracula	Additional Voices	Direct-to-video
2006	The Ant Bully	Wasp Leader	Voice
2008	Los Campeones de la Lucha Libre	Mr. Profesional	Voice
2009	Green Lantern: First Flight	Cuch	Voice, direct-to-video
2010	Vampire	Mt. Tanner	
2010	Bob & Bob	Police Officer	Voice, short
2011	Justice League: Crisis on Two Earths	Jimmy Olsen/Mr. Action	Voice, direct-to-video
2014	Suit & Tie	Land Lord	Short
2014	Techgasm - Apple Watch	Ricky	Short
2018	Duke	Narrator	
2025	I Know Catherine, the Log Lady		Director, producer, and editor

=== Television ===
Year	Title	Role	Notes
1985	Hill Street Blues	Chauffeur	Episode: "Queen for a Day"
1985	Airwolf	Soldier	Episode: "Airwolf 2"
1986	Remington Steele	Wade	Episode: "Steele Spawning"
1987	St. Elsewhere	Cage	Episode: "Cold War"
1987	Matlock	Lt. Ray Walters	Episode: "The Court-Martial: Part 1"
1989	Falcon Crest	Nathan Farley	2 episodes
1989–1990	Santa Barbara	Dan Novack	5 episodes
1988–1990	China Beach	Third Doctor / Dr. Dee	2 episodes
1991	American Playhouse	Gambler	Episode: "Triple Play II"
1994	Melrose Place	Roy	Episode: "Reunion Blues"
1997	Chicago Hope	Lance Jordan	Episode: "The Adventures of Baron Von Munchausen... by Proxy"
2000	Judging Amy	Mr. Atwood	Episode: "Waterworld"
2001	Justice League	Orm	Voice, episode: "The Enemy Below"
2002	The West Wing	Jerry	Episode: The Red Mass
2007	Ben 10	Benmummy	Voice, episode: "The Return"
2006–2008	The Batman	Hugo Strange, Toyman	Voice, 5 episodes
2009	Batman: The Brave and the Bold	General Kreegaar	Voice, episode: "Mystery in Space!"
2011	Transformers: Prime	Skyquake	Voice, episode: "Masters & Students"
2011	Star Wars: The Clone Wars	Lo-Taren, Krix	Voice, 2 episodes

=== Video games ===
Year	Title	Role	Notes
1994	99.2: A SpyQuest Adventure	Nick Noble	
2001	Star Wars: Rogue Squadron II: Rogue Leader	Rebel Wingman	
2003	Enter the Matrix		
2003	Brute Force	Tex	
2003	Robin Hood: Defender of the Crown	Guy of Gisbourne	
2004	World of Warcraft		
2005	X-Men Legends II: Rise of Apocalypse	Magneto	Credited as Richard Greene
2006	The Ant Bully	Wasp Leader	
2006	Marvel: Ultimate Alliance	Magneto	Credited as Richard Greene
2008	Condemned 2: Bloodshot	Inferi, Policeman, Speedballer	
2008	Command & Conquer: Red Alert 3		
2010	Mass Effect 2	Vido Santiago	
2012	Diablo III	Additional voices	
2012	World of Warcraft: Mists of Pandaria		
2013	StarCraft II: Heart of the Swarm	Kraith	
2014	Diablo III: Reaper of Souls	Additional voices	
