= DumbLand =

2002 animated web series by David Lynch

- Cover of the DVD release of DumbLand, depicting the main character Randy
- Genre: Adult animation; Black comedy; Surreal humor; Animated sitcom
- Created by: David Lynch
- Voices of: David Lynch
- Country of origin: United States
- Original language: English
- No. of seasons: 1
- No. of episodes: 8 (list of episodes)

Production
- Running time: 3–5 minutes

Original release
- Release: 2002

DumbLand is an adult animated web series created and voiced by director David Lynch that was commissioned by gaming and entertainment website Shockwave.com in 2000. After the dot-com bubble burst, the episodes were eventually released through Lynch's website in 2002, and were released as a DVD on March 28, 2006. The total running time of all eight episodes is 33 minutes, 28 seconds.

The series details the daily routines of a dull-witted white trash man. The man lives in a house along with his frazzled wife and squeaky-voiced child, both of whom are nameless as is the man in the shows. Lynch's website, however, identifies the male character by the name Randy and the child by the name Sparky. The wife is not named.

The style of the series is intentionally crude both in terms of presentation and content, with limited animation.

== Production ==
Each three-to-five-minute episode took Lynch ten days to make. The soundtrack was created at his home using a computer and he drew the animation with a mouse.

== List of episodes ==
No. in season	Title
1	"The Neighbor"
Randy makes small talk with a neighbor about the neighbor's shed. After the neighbor mentions that he has a false arm, they are interrupted by a passing helicopter. Randy swears and screams at the helicopter until it leaves, then mentions that he has heard the neighbor has sex with ducks. A duck emerges from the shed, and the neighbor admits that he is a "one-armed duck-fucker".
2	"The Treadmill"
While watching a football game on TV, Randy loses his temper when his wife disturbs him by running on a noisy treadmill. Randy attempts (with disastrous results) to destroy the treadmill. Meanwhile, an Abraham Lincoln-quoting door-to-door salesman—with an appearance similar to Freaky Fred—finds himself in the wrong place at the wrong time, while Randy's son manages to present dead fowl for dinner.
3	"The Doctor"
After Randy shocks himself while trying to fix a broken lamp, a doctor arrives to test the dazed man's pain threshold, using increasingly violent methods, until Randy finally regains his senses and decides to do some testing of his own. The doctor (apparently oblivious to the fact that he was beaten up) claims that Randy is "completely normal", only for the wife to burst into the clinic screaming.
4	"A Friend Visits"
Randy destroys his wife's new clothesline and throws it over the fence, causing a catastrophic car wreck. Then Randy's friend visits and the two talk about hunting and killing things, all the while drinking, burping, and farting.
5	"Get the Stick!"
A screaming man crashes through Randy's fence with a wooden stick wedged in his mouth. Sparky cheers his dad on as he tries to get the stick out. Randy breaks the man's neck and pokes out both of his eyes before finally pulling the stick through one of his eye sockets. The horribly mutilated man rolls out into the street and is run over by a truck. Randy notes "the fucker never even said 'thank you'".
6	"My Teeth are Bleeding"
Sparky is bouncing on a trampoline in the front room yelling that his teeth are bleeding, while the wife yammers until blood starts pouring out of her head. Outside on the street violent traffic accidents and shootouts occur. A noisy and bloody wrestling match is playing on TV. All is well until a fly interrupts Randy's serene existence.
7	"Uncle Bob"
Randy is given the charge from an intimidating figure (his mother-in-law) to stay home and watch after his "Uncle Bob" at peril of having his "nuts cut out" if he does not comply. Uncle Bob proceeds to tacitly engage in increasing types of self-abuse, coughing, and vomiting, and eventually punching Randy in the face from across the room. After several iterations of this behavior, Randy anticipates Uncle Bob's actions and preemptively strikes out at him. Almost simultaneously, the mother-in-law storms back into the room and knocks Randy through a wall. Randy spends the rest of the night up a tree until his son informs him that Uncle Bob has been taken to the hospital and Randy is now safe to come down. Bob bit his own foot off.
8	"Ants"
Randy is plagued by an increasing stream of ants into his home. His frustrations rise to the point that he grabs a can of insect killer and attempts to eliminate his ant problem. In his haste and anger, he fails to realize that the nozzle on the bug killer is pointed not at the ants but at his own face. He is squirted in the face with the killer for several seconds. He then falls to the ground and experiences a vivid hallucination in which the ants are singing and dancing and offering gleeful taunts of "asshole", "shithead", and "dumb-turd". Randy eventually snaps out of his predicament and charges at the ants slapping at them on the floor, wall, and ceiling. He is later shown falling off the ceiling and suffering substantial injuries that require a full body cast. The final scene shows ants crawling over his incapacitated body and into an opening in the cast at his feet. Randy then screams helplessly in agony as hundreds of ants march into his body cast.

The final episode "Ants" parodies Lynch's attempts at being a music producer in the early 1990s by featuring a singer who resembles Julee Cruise and music similar to that of long-time collaborator Angelo Badalamenti (both of whom Lynch worked with on the soundtrack to Twin Peaks as well as the concert film Industrial Symphony No. 1).

== Reception ==
The presentation of the series on the Criterion Channel called it "the angriest cartoon in the world".

== Screenings ==
The series was screened as part of a Lynch retrospective in Lisbon in 2007.

== See also ==
- The Angriest Dog in the World, a comic strip by Lynch
