= Boston Society of Film Critics Awards 1986 =

Annual US film awards ceremony

7th BSFC Awards

January 11, 1987

Best Film:
Blue Velvet

The 7th Boston Society of Film Critics Awards honored the best filmmaking of 1986. The awards were given on 11 January 1987.

== Winners ==
- Best Film:
  - Blue Velvet
- Best Actor:
  - Bob Hoskins – Mona Lisa
- Best Actress:
  - Chloe Webb – Sid and Nancy
- Best Supporting Actor (tie):
  - Dennis Hopper – Blue Velvet
  - Ray Liotta – Something Wild
- Best Supporting Actress:
  - Dianne Wiest – Hannah and Her Sisters
- Best Director (tie):
  - David Lynch – Blue Velvet
  - Oliver Stone – Platoon
- Best Screenplay:
  - Woody Allen – Hannah and Her Sisters
- Best Cinematography:
  - Frederick Elmes – Blue Velvet
- Best Documentary:
  - Mother Teresa
- Best Foreign-Language Film:
  - Betty Blue (37°2 le matin) • France
