= Something Wild (1986 film) =

1986 film by Jonathan Demme

- Theatrical release poster
- Directed by: Jonathan Demme
- Written by: E. Max Frye
- Produced by: Jonathan Demme; Kenneth Utt
- Starring: Melanie Griffith; Jeff Daniels; Ray Liotta
- Cinematography: Tak Fujimoto
- Edited by: Craig McKay
- Music by: Laurie Anderson; John Cale
- Production company: Orion Pictures; Religioso Primitiva Productions
- Distributed by: Orion Pictures
- Release date: November 7, 1986
- Running time: 113 minutes
- Country: United States
- Language: English
- Budget: $7 million
- Box office: $8.4 million

Something Wild is a 1986 American comedy thriller film directed and produced by Jonathan Demme, from a screenplay by E. Max Frye. It stars Melanie Griffith, Jeff Daniels, and Ray Liotta. In the film, an uptight investment banker (Daniels) goes on an impromptu road trip with a mysterious, care-free woman (Griffith), but they face trouble when her ex-convict husband (Liotta) turns up.

Something Wild was theatrically released in the United States on November 7, 1986, by Orion Pictures. The film grossed $8.4 million worldwide. It received positive reviews from critics, with praise for Griffith and Daniels' chemistry and performances, direction, screenplay. At the 44th Golden Globe Awards, the film was nominated for Best Actor in a Motion Picture – Musical or Comedy (Daniels), Best Actress in a Motion Picture – Musical or Comedy (Griffith), and Best Supporting Actor – Motion Picture (Liotta).

== Plot ==
Charlie Driggs is a conventional New York City yuppie investment banker. After he leaves a greasy spoon diner without paying, a wildly dressed woman with a brunette bob who calls herself Lulu confronts him. Lulu offers Charlie a ride downtown but instead heads for New Jersey and throws his beeper from the moving car. Lulu openly drinks liquor while driving and stops in a town to buy more. While Charlie phones his office, Lulu — unbeknownst to him — robs a liquor store.

Charlie claims the cash he is carrying is for his Christmas club account, but Lulu persuades him to pay for a room at a roadside motel. Once inside she handcuffs him to the bed. She phones his boss and puts the receiver to his head while they are having sex, forcing him into an awkward conversation. Later, Charlie pretends to phone his wife, keeping Lulu unaware that his marriage ended nine months ago.

After sharing a meal with Lulu at an Italian restaurant, Charlie realizes he is unable to pay with what little cash he has left. Lulu leaves him with the check, forcing him to flee the restaurant to escape an angry chef who demands payment. After spending the night at a motel in rural Pennsylvania, Lulu and Charlie awaken to find a police officer and tow truck near the car she drove down an embankment and into a signpost the night before. Lulu abandons the car and buys one from a sleazy used car dealer, leaving Charlie wondering where she got the money. He starts to enjoy Lulu's free-wheeling lifestyle and realizes he is falling in love with her.

Lulu confesses that her real name is Audrey and introduces Charlie as her husband to her mother, Peaches, at her Pennsylvania home. She appears as a demure blonde, having removed her brunette wig. She takes Charlie to her high school reunion, where a former classmate recognizes him as his office colleague. Audrey's violent ex-convict husband, Ray Sinclair, also appears and makes clear that he wants her back.

After ditching his date, Ray takes Audrey and Charlie along while he robs a convenience store. He pistol-whips a clerk and breaks Charlie's nose. They drive to a cheap motel, where Ray forces Charlie to admit his wife left him (having learned this from Charlie's colleague at the class reunion). Realizing Charlie has deceived her, Audrey stays behind with Ray.

Despite Ray warning him to stay away from him and Audrey, Charlie secretly tails the couple as they leave the motel. Charlie confronts Ray in a Virginia restaurant with several police officers seated nearby and threatens to reveal Ray's parole violations unless he allows Audrey to leave with him. He demands that Ray hand over his wallet and car keys and leaves the check with Ray to force him to stay behind as they flee. Ray is saved from this dilemma by a shop girl he had met earlier.

Charlie takes Audrey to his Stony Brook, Long Island, home, but Ray tracks them down and breaks in by hurling a patio chair through a sliding glass door. He severely beats Charlie and handcuffs him to the pipes under the bathroom sink before attacking Audrey. Charlie frees himself by pulling the pipes apart and strangles Ray with the handcuffs. During the scuffle, Charlie retrieves Ray's dropped knife. Ray dies when he accidentally impales himself on the knife Charlie is holding. Audrey is taken away for questioning when the police arrive.

Charlie later quits his job and looks for Audrey at her apartment, but finds she has moved. Outside the diner where Charlie met Audrey, a waitress accuses him of leaving without paying. Audrey suddenly appears with the cash he left on the table in her hand. Stylishly dressed and with elegant makeup, she smiles and invites Charlie into her woodie station wagon and back into her life.

== Cast ==
- Jeff Daniels as Charles Driggs
- Melanie Griffith as Audrey "Lulu" Hankel
- Ray Liotta as Ray Sinclair
- Margaret Colin as Irene
- Tracey Walter as The Country Squire
- Dana Preu as "Peaches"
- Jack Gilpin as Larry Dillman
- Charles Napier as the irate chef
- Robert Ridgely as Richard Graves
- Sister Carol as "Dottie"
- The Feelies as The Willies
- Kristin Olsen as Tracy
- John Sayles as the motorcycle cop
- Steve Scales as Nelson
- The Texas Kid as the hitchhiking cowboy
- Su Tissue as Peggy Dillman
- John Waters as the used car salesman
- Kenneth Utt as “Dad”
- Adelle Lutz as “Rose”
- Dorothy Demme and Emma Byrne as Junk Store Gals
- Gary Goetzman as Guido Paonessa
- Edward Saxon as Kevin Stroup

== Production ==
E. Max Frye wrote the script as a spec when at film school. He got an agent from the script and told the agent his ideal directors would be Martin Scorsese or Jonathan Demme. Since Scorsese was busy on After Hours the agent sent the script to Demme, who read it and was enthusastic. Demme:

I didn't recognize these characters from any other movies I had seen. It kept surprising you at every twist and turn, and there was this theme of the flipside of putting on your neat suits and committing a certain kind of financial violence as a successful yuppie in a corporation. The dark side of that is a guy like Ray Liotta, who resorts to a more fundamental kind of violence to solve his problems and to get ahead. I liked this collision and I liked what the script said about violence - how once you start going down that path it's going to be where you wind up, and you're going to take many unfortunate people with you. I felt it had a powerful, as well as pertinent, thing to say in the midst of a great yarn.

Demme also liked the idea of making a lower-budgeted movie after his poor experiences on Swing Shift. He thought of Melanie Griffith for the lead while reading the script, being particularly impressed by her performance in Body Double. Demme thought of Kevin Kline for the male lead but Orion suggested Jeff Daniels, who had just made The Purple Rose of Cairo for the studio. They had trouble finding an actor to play Ray until Melanie Griffith suggested Ray Liotta from her acting class.

Demme placed a great deal of emphasis on music for the movie. "We used reggae a lot because part of the theme of Something Wild was how Jeff Daniels is, literally, waking up and seeing things for the first time in a long time because he's been such a shut-down, bone-headed yuppie. For me, showing America to an exotic kind of music - reggae - helped to sell the idea of this new look at things."

== Reception ==
=== Critical response ===
Something Wild was acclaimed by critics. The film holds a 92% approval rating on Rotten Tomatoes based on 49 reviews, with an average rating of 7.40/10. The website's critical consensus reads: "Boasting loads of quirky charm, a pair of likable leads, and confident direction from Jonathan Demme, Something Wild navigates its unpredictable tonal twists with room to spare." On Metacritic, the film has a weighted average score of 73 out of 100, based on 14 critics, indicating "generally favorable reviews". Audiences polled by CinemaScore gave the film an average grade of "B−" on an A+ to F scale.

Chicago Sun-Times film critic Roger Ebert rated the film 31/2-stars-out-of-4 and stated "Something Wild is quite a movie. Demme is a master of finding the bizarre in the ordinary. The accomplishment of Demme and the writer, E. Max Frye, is to think their characters through before the very first scene. They know all about Charlie and Lulu, and so what happens after the meeting outside that restaurant is almost inevitable, given who they are and how they look at each other. This is one of those rare movies where the plot seems surprised at what the characters do." Chicago Tribune film critic Dave Kehr gave the film a perfect four star review, stating "It's not every day that someone goes Alfred Hitchcock one better, but in Something Wild, Jonathan Demme has done it."

Pauline Kael, writing for the New Yorker, stated: "Something Wild is rough-edged. It doesn’t have the grace of Demme's Citizens Band and Melvin and Howard or the heightened simplicity of his Stop Making Sense. It has something else, though -- a freedom that takes off from the genre framework." A more mixed review from Vincent Canby of the New York Times stated: "The performances are, without exception, good. The film's principal difficulty is E. Max Frye's original screenplay, which is better thought out in terms of its narrative than of the characters."

In his seminal work Postmodernism, American theorist Fredric Jameson uses the film's premises, along with others' such as that of Orson Welles' The Trial, for his observations on the possibilities for rebellion in modern or postmodern capitalist society.

=== Accolades ===
Award	Category	Nominee(s)	Result	Ref.
Boston Society of Film Critics Awards	Best Supporting Actor	Ray Liotta	Won (Note: Tied with Dennis Hopper for Blue Velvet.)	
Casting Society of America	Best Casting for Feature Film – Comedy	Risa Bramon and Billy Hopkins	Nominated	
Edgar Allan Poe Awards	Best Motion Picture Screenplay	E. Max Frye	Won	
Golden Globe Awards	Best Actor in a Motion Picture – Musical or Comedy	Jeff Daniels	Nominated	
Golden Globe Awards	Best Actress in a Motion Picture – Musical or Comedy	Melanie Griffith	Nominated	
Golden Globe Awards	Best Supporting Actor – Motion Picture	Ray Liotta	Nominated	
National Society of Film Critics Awards	Best Supporting Actor	Ray Liotta	3rd Place	
New York Film Critics Circle Awards	Best Supporting Actor	Ray Liotta	3rd Place	

== Home media ==
Something Wild was released on VHS by HBO Video on July 15, 1987. The film was released on DVD by MGM on June 5, 2001, presented in its original 1.85:1 widescreen aspect ratio. The only special feature was the original theatrical trailer.

On May 10, 2011, Something Wild was released by The Criterion Collection on DVD and Blu-ray. The Blu-ray has a new, restored high-definition digital transfer, supervised by director of photography Tak Fujimoto and approved by director Jonathan Demme. It also features new video interviews with Demme and writer E. Max Frye, the original theatrical trailer, and a special booklet featuring an essay by film critic David Thompson.

== Soundtrack ==
Professional ratings
Review scores
Source	Rating
AllMusic	link
The Village Voice	B+

The film's soundtrack was released on LP and CD, featuring only 10 of the 49 tracks in the title credits. Notable omissions from the CD were the school reunion songs performed by The Feelies (including "Fame", "Before the Next Teardrop Falls" and "I'm a Believer"), and The Troggs' "Wild Thing" (which gave the film its title and which was sung in the convertible scene).

Track listing

1. "Loco De Amor (Crazy For Love)" by David y Celia – 3:45
2. "Ever Fallen In Love" by Fine Young Cannibals – 3:48
3. "Zero, Zero Seven Charlie" by UB40 – 3:48
4. "Not My Slave" by Oingo Boingo – 4:23
5. "You Don't Have To Cry" by Jimmy Cliff – 3:57
6. "With You Or Without You" by Steve Jones – 4:46
7. "Highlife" by Sonny Okosun – 3:40
8. "Man With A Gun" by Jerry Harrison – 4:32
9. "Temptation" by New Order – 3:28
10. "Wild Thing" by Sister Carol – 4:05

=== Charts ===
Chart (1987)	Peak position
Australia (Kent Music Report)	62

== See also ==
- List of American films of 1986
