= Shadows of Paradise =

2016 documentary about TM and the David Lynch Foundation

- Release poster
- Directed by: Sebastian Lange
- Written by: Sebastian Lange
- Produced by: Frederic Bohbot
- Starring: David Lynch; Bob Roth
- Narrated by: Sebastian Lange
- Cinematography: Sebastian Lange
- Edited by: Roland Schlimme
- Music by: Ramachandra Borcar
- Production company: Bunbury Films
- Release date: October 6, 2016 (Festival du nouveau cinéma)
- Running time: 87 minutes
- Country: Canada
- Language: English

Shadows of Paradise is a 2016 Canadian documentary film written and directed by Sebastian Lange, following David Lynch and Bob Roth during the transition period for the Transcendental Meditation movement after the passing of its founder, Maharishi Mahesh Yogi, and the filmmaker's own upbringing and disillusionment with the movement.

== Summary ==
The film begins with the cremation of the Maharishi Mahesh Yogi before following Bob Roth and David Lynch during their promotional tours across the world, spreading the teachings of the Maharishi through Transcendental Meditation (TM), including also a star-studded "Change Begins Within" benefit concert at Radio City Music Hall in 2009. The film then follows Lynch during speaking events, including his thoughts on art versus TM's mission for world peace. The documentary then transitions back to the foundational building of TM structures in Fairfield, Iowa, recounted by Lange as he traces the history of TM's beginning as an individual technique into a group effort towards world peace. Life in Fairfield's TM program is outlined by Lange to entail two-hour daily meditation, study of Vedic literature, and ignoring negative thoughts. Over time, Lange grew doubtful toward TM and its promises of enlightenment and world peace. The film then switches back to Lynch and Roth, following their trip to India to research the Maharishi's life, with Lynch planning to make a film on the yogi. Lynch and Roth go on to fundraise for TM teachers while Lange ventures further into India to find the cave where the Maharishi's guru, Brahmananda Saraswati, lived in solitude.

== Production ==
The film's director, Sebastian Lange, grew up in the TM movement at Fairfield, Iowa. After leaving the town and movement following loss of faith, Lange returned to the TM movement to document the expansion of the David Lynch Foundation in the wake of the Maharishi's death, including the travels of Lynch and Roth to mingle with celebrities and donors, as well as venturing to India to find the cultural roots of Transcendental Meditation.

== Release ==
The film has its world premiere at the Cinéma du Parc in Montreal on October 11, 2016, as part of the Festival du nouveau cinéma.
