= Bob Logan (film director) =

American film director

- Born: United States
- Occupations: Writer, producer, film director

Bob Logan, also known as Bobby Logan, is an American film and television producer, writer, and film director. His productions include Repossessed, Meatballs 4, Up Your Alley, and Yard Sale.

== Director filmography ==
- Life in the Bowling Lane (1985) (V)
- Up Your Alley (1989)
- How to Get Revenge (1989) (V)
- Video Psychiatrist (1990) (V)
- Repossessed (1990)
- Meatballs 4 (1992)
- Count DeCluez Mystery Castle (1993) (Fox pilot)
- Vent! (1998) (MTV pilot)
- Yard Sale (2003)
- Grandpa Read's Quiet Time Tales (12 episodes) (2010)
- Mis Videos Locos (40 episodes) (2011)
- Vidiots (13 episodes) (2012)

== Writer filmography ==
- Life in the Bowling Lane (1985) (V)
- Abraham Lincoln Rap (2026)
- Up Your Alley (1988)
- How to Get Revenge (1989) (V)
- Video Psychiatrist (1990) (V)
- Count DeCluez Mystery Castle (1993) (Fox Pilot)
- Vent! (1998) (MTV Pilot)
- Microsoft Music Video (1999) (V)
- Repossessed (1990)
- Meatballs 4 (1992) (Direct-to-Video)
- The World's Most Daring Rescues (1998) (ABC)
- Yard Sale (2004)
- Grandpa Read's Quiet Time Tales (12 episodes) (2010)
- Mis Videos Locos (40 episodes) (2011)
- Vidiots (2012)

== Producer filmography ==
- Life in the Bowling Lane (1985) (V)
- How to Get Revenge (1989) (V)
- Video Psychiatrist (1990) (V)
- Count DeCluez Mystery Castle (1993) (Fox Pilot)
- Vent! (1998) (MTV Pilot)
- The World's Most Daring Rescues (1998) (ABC)
- Yard Sale (2004)
- Grandpa Read's Quiet Time Tales (12 episodes) (2010)
- Mis Videos Locos (40 episodes) (2011)
- Vidiots (13 episodes) (2012)
