= Catherine E. Coulson =

American actress (1943–2015)

- Coulson as the Log Lady in Twin Peaks
- Born: Catherine Elizabeth Coulson; October 22, 1943; Elmhurst, Illinois, U.S.
- Died: September 28, 2015 (aged 71); Ashland, Oregon, U.S.
- Education: Scripps College (B.A.); San Francisco State (M.F.A.)
- Occupation: Actress
- Notable work: Twin Peaks
- Spouses: Jack Nance (m. 1968; div. 1976): Marc Sirinsky
- Children: 1

Catherine Elizabeth Coulson (October 22, 1943 – September 28, 2015) was an American stage and screen actress and camera assistant who worked behind the scenes on various studio features, magazine shows and independent films as well as acting in theater and film since the age of 15. She is best known for her role as Margaret Lanterman, the enigmatic Log Lady, in the David Lynch TV series Twin Peaks.

== Life and career ==
=== Early years ===
Coulson was born in Elmhurst, Illinois, and grew up in Southern California, the daughter of Rodney Coulson, a radio and television producer and public relations executive, and ballet dancer Elizabeth (née Fellegi). She earned a BA degree at Scripps College and a MFA at San Francisco State University.

=== Acting career ===
Coulson met Lynch in 1971 and performed various behind the scenes functions during the four-year filming of his low-budget classic Eraserhead (1977). Lynch reports that she began meditating at the same time as did he during this period. She also appeared in Lynch's short film The Amputee (1974), in which she played a woman with no legs.

During the filming of Eraserhead, Lynch told Coulson that he had an image in his head of her holding a large log. Fifteen years later, he created such a role for her in Twin Peaks, on which she appeared in 12 episodes through seasons 1 and 2.

Coulson went on to reprise her role in the film prequel, Twin Peaks: Fire Walk with Me, and in the 2017 revival. In the new series, her character (the Log Lady) appears in the first, second, tenth, eleventh and fifteenth episodes, where she passes on a message from her log for Deputy Hawk to resume the search for Agent Cooper.

Coulson appeared in "Dual Spires", a 2010 episode of Psych that spoofed Twin Peaks. In 2012, she appeared in the second season of Portlandia.

Coulson was a theatre actor and worked with the Oregon Shakespeare Festival in Ashland, Oregon where she continued to be part of the acting company. Coulson's performance as the pre-recorded role of the Giant's Wife in OSF's 2014 production of Into the Woods was reused when the production was remounted in 2025. She appeared in Calvin Marshall directed by Gary Lundgren. Coulson played the role of Susie in Lundgren's film Redwood Highway with Shirley Knight, Tom Skerritt, and James LeGros.

== Personal life and death ==
Coulson was married to actor Jack Nance (who played Henry Spencer in Eraserhead, and Pete Martell in Twin Peaks) in 1968; they divorced in 1976. Her second husband, Marc Sirinsky, with whom she had a daughter, Zoey (born 1987), is a rabbi, at one point resident at Temple Emek-Shalom in Ashland, Oregon.

Coulson converted to Judaism in the 1980s.

On September 28, 2015, Coulson died of complications from cancer at her home in Ashland. She appeared posthumously in five episodes of the revived Twin Peaks in 2017, reprising her role as the "Log Lady" Margaret Lanterman in scenes filmed before her death; the first episode is dedicated to Coulson, while the fifteenth, the last to feature her character (who announces her upcoming death before dying offscreen), is dedicated to the Lanterman character.

Coulson's life is the subject of the 2025 documentary film I Know Catherine, the Log Lady.

== Filmography ==
=== Selected credits ===
- The Amputee (1974)
- Trick or Treats (1982)
- Twin Peaks (1990–91)
- Femme Fatale (1991)
- Another You (1991)
- Twin Peaks: Fire Walk with Me (1992)
- The Four Diamonds (1995)
- Psych ("Dual Spires", 2010)
- Portlandia (2012)
- Redwood Highway (2013)
- Twin Peaks (2017)
