= Jack Nance =

American actor (1943–1996)

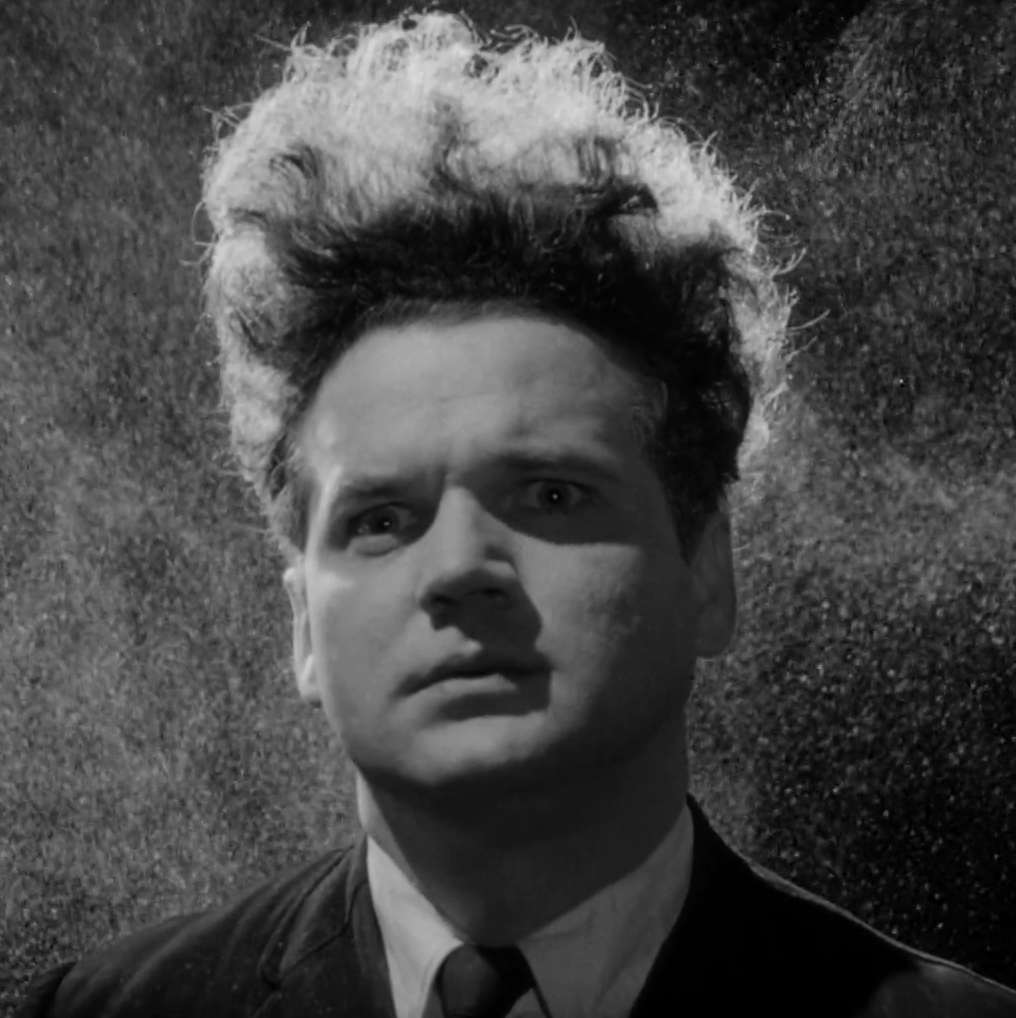
- Nance in Eraserhead (1977)
- Born: Marvin John Nance; December 21, 1943; Boston, Massachusetts, U.S.
- Died: December 30, 1996 (aged 53); South Pasadena, California, U.S.
- Occupation: Actor
- Years active: 1970–1996
- Spouses: Catherine E. Coulson (m. 1968; div. 1976) Kelly Jean Van Dyke (m. 1991; died 1991)

Marvin John "Jack" Nance (December 21, 1943 – December 30, 1996) was an American actor. A frequent collaborator of filmmaker David Lynch, he starred in Lynch's directorial debut Eraserhead (1977) and continued to work with Lynch throughout his career, including a regular role as Pete Martell on Twin Peaks (1990–1991).

== Early life ==
Marvin John Nance was born in Boston, Massachusetts, on December 21, 1943, the son of Agnes (née O'Grady) and Neiman Marcus executive Marvin Hoyt Nance. He grew up in the Oak Cliff neighborhood of Dallas, Texas. During childhood Nance was struck by a car, which injured his back. He graduated from South Oak Cliff High School and studied journalism at North Texas State University where he began acting. Nance dropped out of school to pursue acting full-time and joined the Dallas Theater Center.

== Career ==
In 1964, Nance headed for California and worked for some time with the American Conservatory Theater in San Francisco. He had success and landed the lead role in a play based on the life of Thomas Paine, which was directed by David Lindemann. He was considered for the role of Benjamin in The Graduate (1967), which went to Dustin Hoffman, and for the role of Perry Smith in In Cold Blood (1967), which went to Robert Blake. He played twin brothers Benny and Tony Rebozo in the Doo Dah Gang, a performance group that staged 1920s-style gang fights at nontraditional venues. When one of his characters died, he spent three days lying in a coffin at the staged wake.

Nance met filmmaker David Lynch in 1972 after an introduction by Lindemann. Lynch was a fellow at the American Film Institute and was creating a 20-minute short film in Beverly Hills with $10,000. Lindemann recommended Nance for the role of Henry Spencer in Eraserhead (1977), which was filmed sporadically over five years due to Lynch's funding problems. Eraserhead was initially unsuccessful but slowly became a midnight movie, leading to its cult classic status. Nance's performance has since been praised. The New York Times wrote in 1980 that his "minimalist features, unchanging expression, tight dark suit, and short, almost crippled steps suggest many silent-film comedians". The film became a favorite of Stanley Kubrick, who required the cast of The Shining to watch it before filming began.

Nance continued to work with Lynch in subsequent projects during his lifetime, appearing in Dune (1984), Blue Velvet (1986), The Cowboy and the Frenchman (1988), Wild at Heart (1990), Twin Peaks (1990–1991), Twin Peaks: Fire Walk with Me (1992), and Lost Highway (1997). While none of the scenes he filmed for Fire Walk with Me appeared in the theatrical cut, they were later compiled in Twin Peaks: The Missing Pieces (2014).

Nance appeared with actress Mary Woronov as a married couple in the music video for the 1983 Suicidal Tendencies song "Institutionalized". After gaining sobriety in 1986, and needing a steady salary, Nance took courses in hotel management. He began working as a clerk at Hotel Hollywood. While there, he refused a role in Miracle Mile (1988) due to it conflicting with his job schedule. Dennis Hopper hired him to appear in Colors (1988) after they had both appeared in Blue Velvet. He also had a brief appearance in The Blob (1988).

In 1990, Nance was offered the role of Pete Martell in Lynch's series Twin Peaks, appearing throughout the show's original run. After an addiction relapse in 1993, his life took another turn and he had smaller roles in films that were not as successful. He lived in a hotel, from which he was kicked out for firing a gun at his television. He guest-starred on a 1995 episode of My So-Called Life called "Weekend", in which he played an innkeeper, and continued in smaller roles until his death.

In 2017, 21 years after his death, Nance appeared in the third season of Twin Peaks via footage of his character Pete Martell from the pilot episode of the original series. The episode "Part 17" was dedicated to his memory. His final performance, in Michael Moriarty's Of Things Past, was filmed in 1985 but not released until 2023.

== Personal life ==
=== Relationships ===
Nance married actress Catherine E. Coulson in 1968 and they divorced in 1976.

Nance met and began dating Kelly Jean Van Dyke, the daughter of Jerry Van Dyke and niece of Dick Van Dyke, while in rehab in 1986. They were married in May 1991. On November 17, 1991, Nance was filming Meatballs 4 in Bass Lake, California, and called Van Dyke to tell her that he might be leaving her due to her relapsing. According to Jack Nance in an interview with A Current Affair, Nance said Kelly said she wanted him to listen to her kill herself, which he did. Nance and the film's director Bobby Logan got a local sheriff to contact the Los Angeles Police Department, who entered the couple's home to find that Van Dyke had hanged herself. Nance later claimed that she was four months pregnant.

=== Alcoholism ===
It is unknown when Nance's alcoholism began. Lynch recalled that, during the filming of Eraserhead, he would send Nance "back to his dressing room to sleep off the booze" and that Nance would "get drunk and sometimes end up sleeping in vacant lots". Lynch claimed that he once had to drive Nance to the emergency room for a distended abdomen. He later gave Nance a small role in Dune (1984), which afforded Nance a lot of spare time during filming in Mexico City, much of which he spent drinking.

In 1986, while filming Blue Velvet, Nance told the newly sober Dennis Hopper to help him or he would jump from a window. Hopper traveled back to Los Angeles with Nance, pretending to tempt him with alcohol and drugs, then checked Nance into a rehabilitation centre when they arrived. Nance then went cold turkey. He started drinking again in 1993, after a depressive episode following his wife's suicide, and suffered two strokes from 1995 to 1996. He joined the cast of the film Joyride (1997) but was sent home after one day due to drunkenness on set.

== Death ==
On December 29, 1996, Nance had lunch with friends Leo Bulgarini and Catherine Case, who asked him why he had a "crescent-shaped bruise" under his eye; he admitted that he had been involved in a fight outside a Winchell's Donuts store that morning. He then went home, complaining of a headache. He died the following morning, nine days after turning 53, at his apartment in South Pasadena, California. Bulgarini found his body on the bathroom floor. It was revealed that he had developed a subdural hematoma from the fight, with blunt force trauma listed as his cause of death. An autopsy also showed that his blood alcohol content was 0.24% at the time of his death.

== Legacy ==
The 1997 song "I Gotta Move" by Frank Black and the Catholics refers to the circumstances of Nance's death and the murder of fellow Lynch collaborator Peter Ivers.

I Don't Know Jack, a documentary about Nance funded by Lynch, was released in 2002.

== Filmography ==
=== Film ===
Year	Title	Role	Notes
1970	Fools	Hippie	
1971	Jump	Ace	
1971	Bushman	Felix	
1977	Eraserhead	Henry Spencer	
1977	Breaker! Breaker!	Burton	
1982	Hammett	Gary Salt	
1984	Ghoulies	Wolfgang	
1984	Dune	Nefud	
1984	City Heat	Aram Strossell	
1984	Johnny Dangerously	Priest	
1986	Blue Velvet	Paul	
1987	Barfly	Detective	
1988	Colors	Officer Samuels	
1988	The Blob	Doctor	
1990	Wild at Heart	00 Spool	
1990	The Hot Spot	Julian Ward	
1991	Whore	Man who helps Liz	
1991	Motorama	Motel Clerk	
1992	Meatballs 4	Neil Peterson	
1992	Twin Peaks: Fire Walk with Me	Pete Martell	Deleted scenes
1994	Love and a .45	Justice Thurman	
1994	Across the Moon	Old Cowboy	
1995	The Demolitionist	Father McKenzie	
1995	Voodoo	Lewis	
1996	The Secret Agent Club	Doc	
1996	Little Witches	Father Michael	
1997	Lost Highway	Phil	Posthumous release
2023	Of Things Past	Earl Delaney	Posthumous release; filmed in 1985

=== Television ===
Year	Title	Role	Notes
1984	The Bet		TV film
1987	Crime Story	Charlie Green	Episode: "Little Girl Lost"
1988	The French as Seen by...	Pete	Episode: "The Cowboy and the Frenchman"
1988	Tricks of the Trade	Al	TV film
1990–1991	Twin Peaks	Pete Martell	24 episodes
1994	Another Midnight Run	Reilly	TV film
1995	My So-Called Life	Warren	Episode: "Weekend"
1995	Fallen Angels	Sheriff	Episode: "Tomorrow I Die"
1996	Assault on Dome 4	Mellow / Dome 4 Oldtime	TV film
2017	Twin Peaks: The Return	Pete Martell	Episode "Part 17"; posthumous release; archived footage

=== Music videos ===
Year	Title	Artist	Role	Notes
1983	Institutionalized	Suicidal Tendencies	Father	
