= Six Men Getting Sick (Six Times) =

- Main sequence of Six Men Getting Sick (Six Times)
- Directed by: David Lynch
- Produced by: David Lynch
- Cinematography: David Lynch
- Edited by: David Lynch
- Production company: Pennsylvania Academy of the Fine Arts
- Release date: 1967
- Running time: 4 minutes
- Country: United States
- Budget: $200

Six Men Getting Sick (Six Times) (sometimes known as Six Figures Getting Sick) is a 1967 experimental animated short film, directed by David Lynch. A student project that was developed over the course of a semester, it is Lynch's first film and was shot while he was attending the Pennsylvania Academy of the Fine Arts in Philadelphia, Pennsylvania. The film consists of an animated painting, depicting six dysmorphic figures regurgitating in sequence with the sound of a siren loop. It is currently displayed on a recurring loop in the basement of the Pennsylvania Academy of the Fine Arts.

The film was created on a budget of $200 and upon its screening it was well received by Lynch's peers, earning the Dr. William S. Biddle Cadwalader Memorial Prize at the school's experimental-painting-and-sculpture contest. Six Men Getting Sick received a home-media release in 2001 as part of The Short Films of David Lynch DVD, and it has been noted by critics as containing a similar narrative structure to his 1977 debut feature film Eraserhead.

== Overview ==
Six Men Getting Sick consists of a one-minute animation of a painting by David Lynch looped six times and accompanied by a soundtrack of a siren wailing. The title, which according to the liner notes of The Short Films of David Lynch "expresses what little plot there is", relates to the painting's animation as it depicts "six abstracted figures appearing in outline. Their internal organs become visible, and their stomachs fill with a brightly coloured substance, which travels up to their heads, causing them to vomit."

The film contains no plot, but it has been described by film critics as "a helpful paradigm for Lynch's narrative sense", which "presents us with a humorous example of our own myopia on the subject." The narrative concept of Six Men Getting Sick has drawn comparisons to that of Lynch's debut feature film, 1977's Eraserhead.

== Production ==
Lynch conceived the idea for Six Men Getting Sick in 1966, while attending his second semester at the Pennsylvania Academy of the Fine Arts in Philadelphia, Pennsylvania. In one of the school's art studios Lynch began painting a black landscape and a green garden, with "real dark green coming out of black." Adding a dysmorphic figure of a man to the center of the canvas, Lynch "hear[d] a little wind and [saw] a little movement", which led him to the concept of creating an animated film from a painting.

Lynch discussed the idea of creating an animated film with fellow student Bruce Samuelson. Samuelson was creating "real fleshy paintings" that Lynch admired, and Lynch himself was creating a series of "'mechanical women'—women who turned into typewriters"; the combination of these ideas was the basis for their film. Samuelson and Lynch's project fell through, although Lynch continued developing his original idea of seeing his paintings move. He purchased a 16 mm camera from Photorama in downtown Philadelphia, whose staff taught Lynch the basics of stop-motion animation and cinematography.

Lynch constructed a sculptured screen measuring 6 ft×10 ft, on which the final film would be projected. In a downtown Philadelphia hotel owned by the Pennsylvania Academy of the Fine Arts, Lynch began shooting Six Men Getting Sick with Jack Fisk, who subsequently became a frequent collaborator. The film was shot in an abandoned room, with Lynch's 16 mm camera taped to the bottom of a dressing table, and single-frame shots were taken while Lynch animated his painting. To further distort the footage, Fisk cast Lynch's head in plaster and added the three plaster casts to the sculptured screen Lynch had built prior to the film shoot. Lynch then recorded a one-minute siren loop to go with the finished film. In total, Six Men Getting Sick cost $200, a sum Lynch later referred to as "completely unreasonable."

== Release ==
Six Men Getting Sick debuted in 1967 at an experimental-painting-and-sculpture contest held at the end of the semester at the Pennsylvania Academy of the Fine Arts. For its premiere, Lynch constructed an Erector Set rig that was placed on top of the projector "so that it would take the finished film through the projector, way up to the ceiling and then back down", in order for the one-minute film to be presented as a four-minute continuous loop. The film was well received among Lynch's peers and earned him joint first prize at the contest, the Dr. William S. Biddle Cadwalader Memorial Prize, which he shared with fellow painter and student Noel Mahaffey.

The film was made available on home-media release in 2001. It was included on The Short Films of David Lynch, a remastered DVD collection of Lynch's earliest films, which was distributed through his official website. It was later included on David Lynch: The Lime Green Set, a 2008 limited-edition ten-disc DVD-and-CD box set. In a retrospective review for DVD Verdict, Judge Bill Gibron referred to Six Men Getting Sick as "a disturbing and intoxicating work" and "the effect [of it] unnerving."

== Legacy ==
Although Six Men Getting Sick was successful among his peers, Lynch considered never again experimenting with filmmaking due to the expense of creating the film. However, following its release he was approached by classmate H. Barton Wasserman, who admired the film and was looking for a similar project to be made for an art installation at his home.

Wasserman offered Lynch $1,000 to complete the project, to which Lynch "immediately said yes". Lynch, who had "a fixation on getting [his] own camera", purchased a clockwork Bolex film camera and spent two months creating the project, which was to be presented in a split-screen format and comprised one-third live action shots and two-thirds animation. Upon completion the film was developed, although technical errors occurred during the process, resulting in the final reel being "just a continuous blur." Wasserman decommissioned the project and allowed Lynch to keep the remainder of the budgeted funds, which went towards the production of Lynch's second short film, 1968's The Alphabet—a film which, in turn, led to the creation of Eraserhead.

In 2014 the creators of the YouTube video series Marble Hornets stated that Lynch's short films, including Six Men Getting Sick, were a major influence on their own work.

== See also ==
- List of American films of 1967
- Early life of David Lynch
