= Frederick Elmes =

American cinematographer

- Born: November 4, 1946 (age 79); Mountain Lakes, New Jersey, U.S.
- Education: Rochester Institute of Technology (BFA); American Film Institute (MFA); New York University (MFA)
- Years active: 1970–present
- Website: fredelmes.com

Frederick Elmes, ASC (born November 4, 1946) is an American cinematographer, known for his association with the independent film movement, having worked mostly with directors David Lynch and Jim Jarmusch.

== Life and career ==
Born in Mountain Lakes, New Jersey, Elmes studied photography at the Rochester Institute of Technology, then attended the American Film Institute in Los Angeles, graduating in 1972. He enrolled in the Graduate Film Program at New York University's Department of Film and Television and graduated in 1975.

At the American Film Institute, Elmes met aspiring film director David Lynch, who hired him for Eraserhead (1977).

Elmes has been a member of the American Society of Cinematographers since 1993.

== Filmography ==
=== Documentary film ===
| Year | Title | Director | Notes |
|---|---|---|---|
| 1970 | Street Scenes 1970 | Martin Scorsese | |
| 1983 | Citizen: The Political Life of Allard K. Lowenstein | Julie M. Thompson | |
| 1985 | Broken Rainbow | Maria Florio; Victoria Mudd | With Baird Bryant, Victoria Mudd, Tony St. John and Joan Weidman |
| 1987 | Heaven | Diane Keaton | With Joseph J. Kelly |
| 1990 | Hollywood Mavericks | Florence Dauman; Dale Ann Stieber | |
| 2025 | I Know Catherine, the Log Lady | Richard Green | |

=== Short film ===
| Year | Title | Director | Notes |
|---|---|---|---|
| 1974 | The Amputee | David Lynch | |
| 1976 | Number One | Dyan Cannon | Also editor |
| 1987 | Liebestod | Franc Roddam | Segment of Aria |
| 1988 | Speed Demon | Jerry Kramer; Colin Chilvers | Segments of Moonwalker |
| 1988 | Smooth Criminal | Jerry Kramer; Colin Chilvers | Segments of Moonwalker |
| 1988 | Come Together | Jerry Kramer; Colin Chilvers | Segments of Moonwalker |
| 2001 | Chosen | Ang Lee | Segment of The Hire |
| 2002 | Int. Trailer Night | Jim Jarmusch | Segment of Ten Minutes Older: The Trumpet |
| 2003 | Somewhere in California | Jim Jarmusch | Segment of Coffee and Cigarettes |
| 2010 | House Keeping | Johan Renck | |
| 2017 | Hair | John Turturro | |
| 2021 | French Water | Jim Jarmusch | |
| 2025 | Father | Jim Jarmusch | Segments of Father Mother Sister Brother |
| 2025 | Mother | Jim Jarmusch | Segments of Father Mother Sister Brother |

=== Feature film ===
| Year | Title | Director | Notes |
|---|---|---|---|
| 1977 | Eraserhead | David Lynch | With Herbert Cardwell |
| 1977 | Breakfast in Bed | William Haugse | |
| 1983 | Valley Girl | Martha Coolidge | |
| 1986 | River's Edge | Tim Hunter | |
| 1986 | Blue Velvet | David Lynch | |
| 1986 | Allan Quatermain and the Lost City of Gold | Gary Nelson | With Álex Phillips Jr. |
| 1988 | Permanent Record | Marisa Silver | |
| 1990 | Wild at Heart | David Lynch | |
| 1990 | Cold Dog Soup | Alan Metter | |
| 1991 | Night on Earth | Jim Jarmusch | |
| 1993 | The Saint of Fort Washington | Tim Hunter | |
| 1994 | Trial by Jury | Heywood Gould | |
| 1995 | Reckless | Norman René | |
| 1996 | The Empty Mirror | Barry J. Hershey | |
| 1997 | The Ice Storm | Ang Lee | |
| 1998 | The Object of My Affection | Nicholas Hytner | |
| 1999 | Ride with the Devil | Ang Lee | |
| 2000 | Chain of Fools | Traktor | |
| 2001 | Storytelling | Todd Solondz | |
| 2002 | Trapped | Luis Mandoki | With Piotr Sobociński |
| 2003 | Hulk | Ang Lee | |
| 2004 | Kinsey | Bill Condon | |
| 2005 | Broken Flowers | Jim Jarmusch | |
| 2006 | The Namesake | Mira Nair | |
| 2008 | Synecdoche, New York | Charlie Kaufman | |
| 2009 | Bride Wars | Gary Winick | |
| 2009 | Brothers | Jim Sheridan | |
| 2010 | A. Hitler | Barry J. Hershey | |
| 2012 | A Late Quartet | Yaron Zilberman | |
| 2013 | Horns | Alexandre Aja | |
| 2016 | Paterson | Jim Jarmusch | |
| 2017 | Wilson | Craig Johnson | |
| 2019 | The Dead Don't Die | Jim Jarmusch | |
| 2019 | The Jesus Rolls | John Turturro | |

=== Television ===
TV movies

| Year | Title | Director |
|---|---|---|
| 1987 | Conspiracy: The Trial of the Chicago 8 | Jeremy Kagan |
| 1988 | Tales from the Hollywood Hills: Closed Set | Mollie Miller |
| 1997 | In the Gloaming | Christopher Reeve |
| 2009 | A Dog Year | George LaVoo |

Miniseries

| Year | Title | Director | Notes |
|---|---|---|---|
| 1988 | The French as Seen by... | Werner Herzog; David Lynch | 2 episodes |
| 1998 | The Wedding | Charles Burnett | |
| 2014 | Olive Kitteridge | Lisa Cholodenko | |
| 2016 | The Night Of | Steven Zaillian | 4 episodes |
| 2018 | The Looming Tower | Michael Slovis; Craig Zisk | 4 episodes |
| 2019 | The Family | Jesse Moss | 2 episodes |
| 2022 | The Girl from Plainville | Lisa Cholodenko; Daniel Minahan | 3 episodes |

TV series

| Year | Title | Director | Episode |
|---|---|---|---|
| 2020 | Hunters | Alfonso Gomez-Rejon | "In the Belly of the Whale" |

== Awards and nominations ==
| Year | Award | Category | Title | Result |
|---|---|---|---|---|
| 1986 | Boston Society of Film Critics | Best Cinematography | Blue Velvet | Won |
| 1986 | National Society of Film Critics | Best Cinematography | Blue Velvet | Won |
| 1986 | Sitges Film Festival | Best Cinematography | Blue Velvet | Won |
| 1986 | Independent Spirit Awards | Best Cinematography | Blue Velvet | Nominated |
| 1986 | New York Film Critics Circle | Best Cinematography | Blue Velvet | Nominated |
| 1990 | Independent Spirit Awards | Best Cinematography | Wild at Heart | Won |
| 1991 | Independent Spirit Awards | Best Cinematography | Night on Earth | Won |
| 1996 | Fantasporto | Directors' Week Award for Best Cinematography | The Empty Mirror | Won |
| 1996 | WorldFest-Houston International Film Festival | Gold Special Jury Award for Best Cinematography | The Empty Mirror | Won |
| 1997 | Chicago Film Critics Association | Best Cinematography | The Ice Storm | Nominated |
| 1997 | Chlotrudis Award | Best Cinematography | The Ice Storm | Nominated |
| 1997 | Primetime Emmy Awards | Outstanding Cinematography | In the Gloaming | Nominated |
| 2016 | Primetime Emmy Awards | Outstanding Cinematography | The Night Of (For episode "Ordinary Death") | Won |
