= I Know Catherine, the Log Lady =

2025 documentary film

- Film poster
- Directed by: Richard Green
- Produced by: Richard Green; Jenny Sullivan
- Edited by: Richard Green
- Production companies: History of Cool; Next Step Studios
- Release date: February 24, 2025
- Running time: 114 minutes
- Country: United States
- Language: English

I Know Catherine, the Log Lady is a 2025 American documentary film about the life of actress Catherine Coulson, best known for playing the Log Lady in Twin Peaks. The film was produced, edited, and directed by Richard Green.

== Reception ==
On the review aggregator website Rotten Tomatoes, 100% of 11 critics' reviews are positive, with an average rating of 8.1/10.

Kent Hill of Film Threat gave the film a score of 9.5 out of 10 and wrote that it "takes us into the final days, even hours, of Coulson's life as she struggles to prepare for the end and her return to Lynch's weird television world. As with most portraits of an exploratory nature, audiences come to discover that there is so much more to the log lady than meets the eye."
