= The French as Seen by... =

The French as Seen by... (Les Français vus par... in French) was the title and subject of a series of five short films by notable directors. It was initiated and sponsored by the newspaper Le Figaro, as part of the 1988 celebration of the tenth anniversary of its magazine section. The directors and films produced were:

- Werner Herzog - Les Gaulois
- David Lynch - The Cowboy and the Frenchman
- Andrzej Wajda - Proust contre la déchéance
- Luigi Comencini - Pèlerinage à Agen
- Jean-Luc Godard - Le dernier mot
