= Ben Barenholtz =

American film producer (1935–2019)

Ben Barenholtz (October 5, 1935 – June 27, 2019) was a Polish-born American film producer, exhibitor, and distributor with a significant presence in the independent film scene since the late 1960s. In 1968 Barenholtz opened The Elgin Cinema in New York City which was known for its experimental midnight screenings of new filmmakers.

Barenholtz was known for his eye in discovering new directors such as The Coen Brothers, David Lynch, John Sayles, and Guy Maddin, and was the first to bring Cousin Cousine and John Woo's The Killer to the American screens.

He is often credited with launching and being a close collaborator of the Coen Brothers. He developed and produced a number of cult movies including Barton Fink, Miller's Crossing, and Requiem for a Dream.

Barenholtz appeared in the documentary The Hicks of Hollywood, had a bit role in Liquid Sky, and appeared as a zombie in Romero's classic Dawn of the Dead. He was the subject in Stuart Samuels' 2005 documentary Midnight Movies: From the Margin to the Mainstream.

In 2005 Barenholtz directed his first feature, Music Inn, a documentary about the famed jazz venue and was the producer of Jamie Greenberg's feature film Stags. In 2012, he produced Suzuya Bobo's first feature, Family Games.

In 2012 he directed and produced Wakaliwood: The Documentary, shot in the slums of Kampala, Uganda.

In 2016, he received the Berlinale Camera award from the Berlinale Film Festival to honor his contributions to the independent film scene.

Barenholtz directed his first and only fiction film, Alina, starring Darya Ekamasova, which was released in the fall of 2017. At the time of his death he was developing the sequel to Alina as well as working on an autobiographical film, Aaron. He died on June 27, 2019, in Prague, Czech Republic, at the age of 83.

== Early years ==
Ben Barenholtz was born Berl Barenholtz on October 5, 1935, in Kupiczów, Poland, to Aaron and Paula Barenholtz, the youngest in a family of four. He has one older brother, Rubin. Being Jewish, the Barenholtz family spent the war years living in the forest in hiding from Ukrainians collaborating with the Germans. They survived thanks to the help of Władysław Kotowski's family from the Gruszówka village, who sheltered them in the barn during the Ukrainian roundup. In 1947, Ben and his mother immigrated to the United States. After four years of schooling, Ben decided it was not for him, and began working. In 1957, Barenholtz joined the army, serving in Germany in 1958. He came back to New York in 1959, and landed his first job in film as the assistant manager of the RKO Bushwick in Brooklyn, New York.

=== The Village Theater ===
From 1966–68, Barenholtz managed and lived in the Village Theater, which ultimately became the Fillmore East. At the Village Theater, Barenholtz provided a home for the counterculture, with appearances by Timothy Leary, Stokley Carmichael, Rap Brown, Allen Ginsberg, and Paul Krassner. Some of the first meetings of the anti-Vietnam War movement, including Poets Against Vietnam, were held at the Village Theater. It was also a major music venue, with performances by The Who, Leonard Cohen, John Coltrane, Ornette Coleman, Nina Simone, and many others. It also provided a space for Yiddish Vaudeville and Chinese operas.

In 1968, the theater was bought by Bill Graham, who turned it into the Fillmore East, and Barenholtz went on to acquire the Elgin.

=== The Elgin ===
In 1968, Barenholtz opened the Elgin Cinema. Approaching The Film-Makers' Cooperative, Barenholtz suggested the Elgin would be a good place for experimental films, and was given Andy Warhol's Chelsea Girls and $48 to get the theater started. The following month, Barenholtz decided to book the theater himself.

The Elgin became the world's most innovative specialty and revival house, re-launching the films of Buster Keaton and D. W. Griffith, running a variety of independent films by young American directors, and screening cult, underground, and experimental films for the emerging counter cultural audience.

The films of Stan Brakhage, Jack Smith, Kenneth Anger, and Jonas Mekas, as well as early works by Jonathan Demme and Martin Scorsese, all played at the Elgin. The First International Cat Film Festival, and an early Woody Allen tribute (pre-"Sleeper") were also held at the Elgin.

Barenholtz developed new ways of screening movies. He began screening dance and opera films on Saturday and Sunday morning, and created the "All Night Show" movies starting at midnight and ending at dawn. Most notably, Barnenholtz originated the "Midnight Movie" in 1970 with Alejandro Jodorowsky's El Topo, which ran for six months, seven days a week, to sold-out audiences. John Lennon eventually bought the film. John Waters' Pink Flamingos followed El Topo at midnight, then Perry Henzell's The Harder They Come.

== Distribution ==
Barenholtz's first foray into distribution began with King of Hearts by Philippe de Broca. Still in exhibition, he bought the state rights for New York, and began exclusively playing the movie at the Elgin, and another theater near Lincoln Center.

His next film, and his first full film in distribution, was Les Enfants Terribles by Jean Cocteau and Jean-Pierre Melville, an old film that had been re-released. While acquiring the film, he created his own distribution company, Libra Films, which was later bought by the Almi Group, which he stayed with until forming Circle Releasing in 1984.

=== Libra Films ===
In 1972 Barenholtz formed the specialty distributor Libra Films. The first film that Libra Films distributed was a revival of Jean-Pierre Melville's Les Enfants Terrible, followed by Claude Chabrol's Just Before Nightfall, and Jean-Charles Tacchella's Cousin Cousine, which became one of the highest-grossing foreign films in the United States and was nominated for three Academy Awards. Around this time, Barenholtz left the Elgin.

While at Libra, Barenholtz also launched and distributed, among others, George Romero's Martin; John Sayles' first feature, Return of the Secaucus Seven; David Lynch's first feature, Eraserhead; Karen Arthur's first feature, Legacy; Earl Mack's first feature, Children of Theater Street and Péter Gothár's Time Stands Still, which won the New York Film Critic's Award for Best Foreign Film.

Barenholtz sold Libra Films to the Almi Group in 1982, but stayed with the company, becoming President of Libra-Cinema 5 Films. After a year and a half, he left Almi, and formed Circle Films, in partnership with Jim and Ted Pedas, which continued distributing films, including the Coen Brothers' first film, Blood Simple, among others.

=== Films in distribution ===
| Film | Director | Year | Company |
|---|---|---|---|
| Les Enfants Terribles | Jean Pierre Melville | 1950 | Libra Films |
| Night of the Living Dead | George Romero | 1968 | Libra Films |
| The Witness | Péter Bacsó | 1969 | Libra Films |
| Where There's Smoke | André Cayatte | 1973 | Libra Films |
| Just Before Nightfall | Claude Chabrol | 1975 | Libra Films |
| Le Secret | Robert Enrico | 1975 | Libra Films |
| Touch and Go | Philippe De Broca | 1975 | Libra Films |
| A Woman's Decision | Krzysztof Zanussi | 1975 | Libra Films |
| Maitresse | Barbet Schroeder | 1975 | Libra Films |
| Camouflage | Krzysztof Zanussi | 1976 | Libra Films |
| Eraserhead | David Lynch | 1976 | Libra Films |
| Cousin Cousine | Jean-Charles Tacchella | 1976 | Libra Films |
| The Judge and The Killer | Bertrand Tavernier | 1976 | Libra Films |
| Caro Michele | Mario Monicelli | 1976 | Libra Films |
| Nea, The Young Emmanuelle | Nelly Kaplan | 1976 | Libra Films |
| Children of Theater Street | Robert Dornhelm and Earl Mack | 1977 | Libra Films |
| Sebastiane | Paul Humfress & Derek Jarman | 1977 | Libra Films |
| Consequence | Wolfgang Petersen | 1977 | Libra Films |
| Martin | George A. Romero | 1978 | Libra Films |
| Themroc | Claude Faraldo | 1978 | Libra Films |
| Jubilee | Derek Jarman | 1978 | Libra Films |
| Asparagus | Suzan Pitt | 1979 | Libra Films |
| Meetings With Remarkable Men | Peter Brook | 1979 | Example |
| Eboli | Francesco Rosi | 1979 | Almi |
| Return of The Secaucus 7 | John Sayles | 1979 | Libra |
| Ashram | Wolfgang Dobrowonly | 1981 | Libra |
| Blood Wedding | Carlos Saura | 1981 | Libra |
| The Atomic Cafe | Kevin Rafferty, Jayne Loader and Pierce Rafferty | 1982 | Libra |
| Time Stands Still | Péter Gothár | 1982 | Almi |
| Irezumi | Yoichi Takabayashi | 1982 | Almi |
| A Woman in Flames | Robert van Ackeren | 1983 | Almi |
| Il quartetto Basileus | Fabio Carpi | 1983 | Almi |
| The Family Game | Yoshimitsu Morita | 1984 | Circle Releasing Corp. |
| Blood Simple | Joel & Ethan Coen | 1984 | Circle Releasing Corp. |
| My Sweet Little Village | Jiří Menzel | 1985 | Circle Releasing Corp. |
| Letter to Brezhnev | Chris Bernard | 1985 | Circle Releasing Corp. |
| No Surrender | Peter Smith | 1986 | Circle Releasing Corp. |
| Rouge Baiser (Red Kiss) | Vera Belmont | 1986 | Circle Releasing Corp. |
| Thérèse | Alain Cavalier | 1986 | Circle Releasing Corp. |
| The Go Masters | Junya Sato & Duan Ji-Shun | 1986 | Circle Releasing Corp. |
| Pavoratti In China | DeWitt Sage | 1986 | Circle Releasing Corp. |
| Salvation! | Beth B | 1987 | Circle Releasing Corp. |
| The Houses Are Full of Smoke | Allan Francovich | 1987 | Circle Releasing Corp. |
| Beirut: The Last Home Movie | Jennifer Fox | 1988 | Circle Releasing Corp. |
| Distant Harmony | DeWitt Sage | 1988 | Circle Releasing Corp. |
| 36 Fillette | Catherine Breillat | 1988 | Circle Releasing Corp. |
| A Winter Tan | Jackie Burroughs, John Frizzel, Louise Clark and John Walker | 1988 | Circle Releasing Corp. |
| The Navigator | Vincent Ward | 1989 | Circle Releasing Corp. |
| The Beer Drinker's Guide to Fitness and Filmmaking | Fred G. Sullivan | 1989 | Circle Releasing Corp. |
| Tales from the Gimli Hospital | Guy Maddin | 1989 | Circle Releasing Corp. |
| The Killer | John Woo | 1989 | Circle Releasing Corp. |
| The Interrogation | Ryszard Bugajski | 1989 | Circle Releasing Corp. |
| Bye Bye Blues | Anne Wheeler | 1990 | Circle Releasing Corp. |
| Diamond Skulls | Nicholas Broomfield | 1990 | Circle Releasing Corp. |

== Production ==
Barenholtz's involvement in film production began with Wynn Chamberlain's Brand X starring Abbie Hoffman in 1974, before he left The Elgin. A few years later in 1978 he produced George Romero's Martin. The bulk of Barenholtz's production began in ‘1984, when he formed Circle Releasing with Ted and Jim Pedas.

=== Circle Films ===
In 1984, after leaving Almi Barenholtz joined with Ted and Jim Pedas to form Circle Releasing. Among the films released by Circle were Yoshimitsu Morita's The Family Game, Guy Maddin's first feature, Tales from the Gimli Hospital, Vincent Ward's The Navigator, John Woo's The Killer, Catherine Breillat's 36 Fillette, DeWitt Sage's first feature, Pavarotti in China, Alain Cavalier's Thérèse and Blood Simple, the first film by Joel and Ethan Coen.

With Blood Simple, Barenholtz and the Pedas brothers formed a relationship with the Coens, and began producing their next films, Miller's Crossing, Barton Fink, and Raising Arizona. Barton Fink won the Palme d'Or at the 1991 Cannes Film Festival, as well as awards for Best Director and Best Actor. This was the first and last time the three top honors have all gone to the same film at Cannes.

=== Barenholtz Production Inc. ===
Created in 1983, the company began producing films after Barenholtz left Circle Releasing, including George Romero's Bruiser, J Todd Anderson's The Naked Man, and Adek Drabiński's Cheat, which was Philip Seymour Hoffman's first appearance in film. He executive produced Gregory Hines' directorial debut, Bleeding Hearts, and Ulu Grosbard's Georgia, which earned an Academy Award nomination for Mare Winningham. He served as co-executive producer of Darren Aronofsky's Requiem for a Dream, which earned Ellen Burstyn an Academy Award nomination for Best Actress in 2000.

=== Films as a producer ===
| Film | Director | Year |
|---|---|---|
| Raising Arizona | Joel Coen | 1987 |
| Millers Crossing | Joel Coen | 1990 |
| Barton Fink | Joel Coen | 1991 |
| Georgia | Ulu Grosbard | 1995 |
| The Naked Man | J. Todd Anderson | 1998 |
| Bruiser | George A. Romero | 2000 |
| Requiem for a Dream | Darren Aronofsky | 2000 |
| Distress | Blue Kraning | 2003 |
| Music Inn | Ben Barenholtz | 2006 |
| Wakaliwood: the Documentary | Ben Barenholtz | 2013 |
| Family Games | Suzuya Bobo | 2015 |
