= Frederic Sullivan =

Fred, Frederic or Frederick Sullivan may refer to:

- Fred Sullivan (1837–1877), British actor and singer, brother of composer Arthur Sullivan
- Fred G. Sullivan (1945–1996), American filmmaker
- Frederic Richard Sullivan (1872–1937), American film director and actor, nephew of Arthur Sullivan
- Frederick R. Sullivan (1905–1968), American sheriff and politician
- Frederick Sullivan (cricketer) (1797–1873), English cricketer
- Fred Sullivan (American football), American football coach
