= Midnight Movies: From the Margin to the Mainstream =

- Directed by: Stuart Samuels
- Written by: Stuart Samuels; Victor Kushmaniuk
- Starring: John Waters; David Lynch
- Cinematography: Richard Fox
- Production companies: MPix Original; Movie Central HD Original Programming
- Distributed by: Starz Encore Entertainment
- Release date: 13 May 2005
- Running time: 88 minutes
- Countries: Canada; United States
- Language: English

Midnight Movies: From the Margin to the Mainstream is a 2005 documentary film written and directed by Stuart Samuels, based on his book on the subject.

== Summary ==
The film chronicles the period between 1970 and 1977 in which six low-budget films shown at midnight transformed the way films are made and watched: El Topo (1970), Night of the Living Dead (1968), The Harder They Come (1973), Pink Flamingos (1972), The Rocky Horror Picture Show (1975), and Eraserhead (1977).

Also portrayed in the film are the films Freaks (1932) and Reefer Madness (1936), which gained notoriety and a huge cult following thanks to midnight showings. Providing interviews are filmmakers George A. Romero, Alejandro Jodorowsky, John Waters, Perry Henzell, David Lynch, and Richard O'Brien, as well as film critics Roger Ebert, Jonathan Rosenbaum, and J. Hoberman and Ben Barenholtz.

== Release ==
The film was screened out of competition at the 2005 Cannes Film Festival.

== Reception ==
On Rotten Tomatoes, the film has an aggregate score of 91% based on 10 positive and 1 negative critic reviews.

== See also ==
- American Grindhouse-2010 documentary similar in content
- Art film
- Cult film
