= John Nolan (tackle) =

American football player (1926–1996)

No. 44
- Position: Tackle

Personal information
- Born: February 26, 1926; Glens Falls, New York, U.S.
- Died: July 14, 1996 (aged 70); Glens Falls, New York, U.S.
- Listed height: 6 ft 2 in (1.88 m)
- Listed weight: 232 lb (105 kg)

Career information
- High school: St. Mary's Academy (Glens Falls)
- College: College of Holy Cross (1943); Penn State (1945-1947)
- NFL draft: 1948: 3rd round, 14th overall pick

Career history
- Boston Yanks (1948); New York Bulldogs (1949); New York Yanks (1950)

Career NFL statistics
- Games played: 36
- Games started: 15
- Fumble recoveries: 3
- Stats at Pro Football Reference

John Joseph Nolan Jr. (February 26, 1926 – July 14, 1996) was an American professional football tackle.

Nolan was born in 1926 at Glens Falls, New York. He attended high school at St. Mary's Academy in Glens Falls. Playing at right halfback, he led the 1943 St. Mary's team to an undefeated season.

In February 1944, upon reaching age 18, Nolan enrolled at the College of the Holy Cross as part of the V-12 Navy College Training Program. His punting helped lead the 1944 Holy Cross Crusaders football team to a 5–2–2 record.

After World War II, he enrolled at Pennsylvania State University where he starred in both lacrosse and football for the Penn State Nittany Lions. Playing at the tackle position, he was co-captain of the 1947 Penn State Nittany Lions football team to an undefeated record and the No. 4 ranking in the final AP poll.

He was drafted by the Boston Yanks in the third round (14th overall pick) of the 1948 NFL draft. He in the National Football League (NFL) for the Boston Yanks in 1948, the New York Bulldogs in 1949, and the New York Yanks in 1950. He appeared in a total of 36 NFL games, 14 of them as a starter.

From 1957 to 1970, Nolan coached the football, baseball, and basketball teams at his alma mater, St. Mary's Academy in Glens Falls. He compiled a record of 138-63 as the football coach at St. Mary's. From 1970 to 1979, he was employed by the Penn State athletic department with responsibility for equipment and travel for the football team. In 1996, three days after the death of his wife Claire (Hulsebosch), Nolan died at age 70 in Glens Falls.
