= Joyce Theatre Foundation =

Dance organization in Manhattan, New York

Joyce Theater
- Elgin Theater
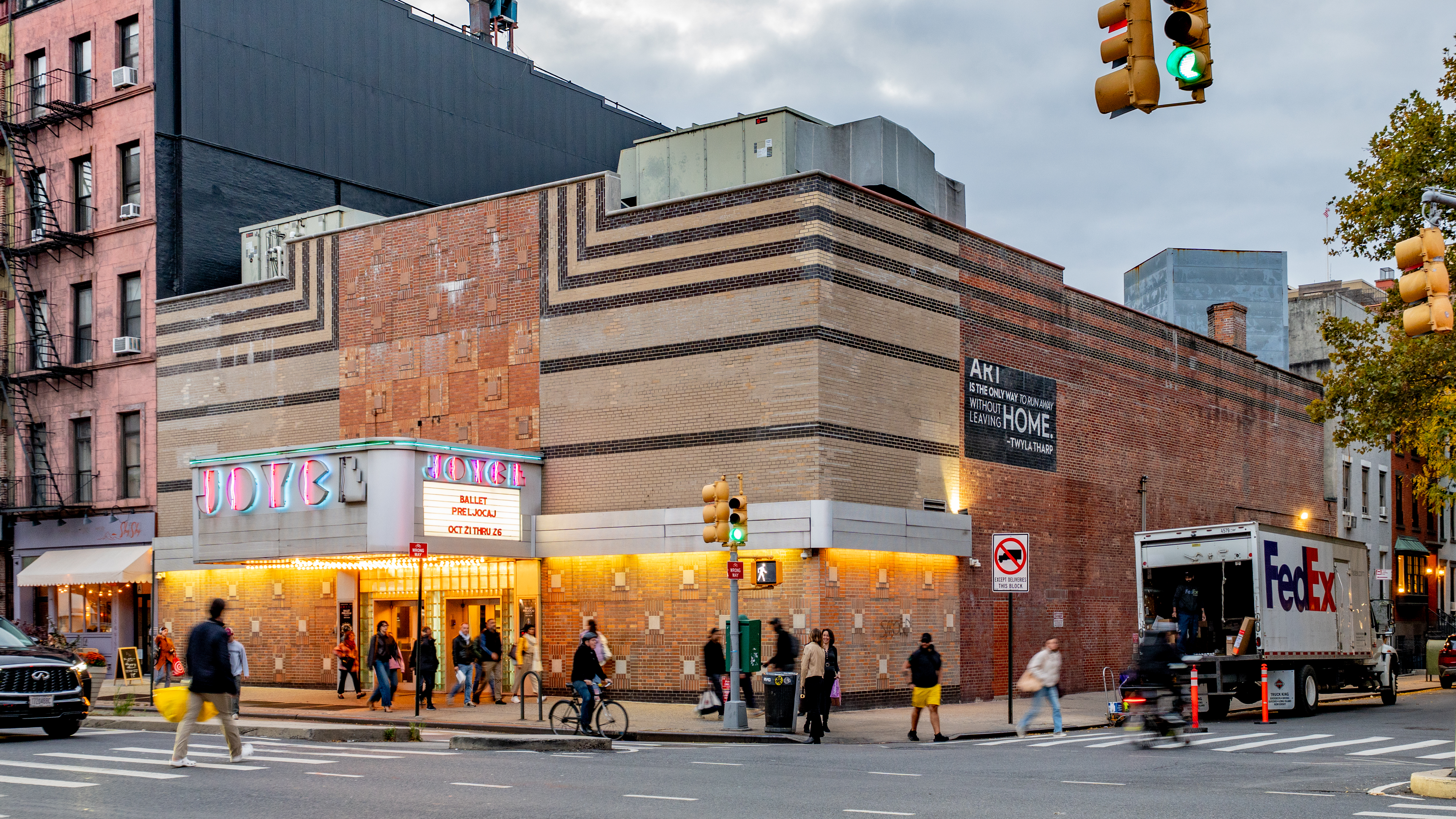
- The Joyce Theater in 2025
- Interactive map of Joyce Theater
- Address: 175 Eighth Avenue; New York City; United States
- Coordinates: 40°44′34″N 74°00′02″W
- Owner: Joyce Theater Foundation
- Capacity: 472
- Current use: dance venue

Construction
- Opened: 1941
- Reopened: 1982
- Architects: Simon Zelnik (1941); Hugh Hardy (1982 renovation)

Website
- www.joyce.org

The Joyce Theater Foundation is a leading presenter of dance in New York City and nationally. It is runs, in part, from the Joyce Theater, a 472-seat dance performance venue located in the Chelsea neighborhood of Manhattan in New York City. The Joyce occupies the Elgin Theater, a former movie house that opened in 1941 and was gut-renovated and reconfigured in 1981–82.

== Creation of The Joyce ==
In 1977, the Eliot Feld Ballet had begun exploring more affordable approaches to presenting its annual season of performances in New York City. Rental costs and house sizes of the theaters available to the company made these seasons financially risky propositions. Eliot Feld, the company’s founder and Artistic Director, and Cora Cahan, its Executive Director, envisioned creating a theater specifically for smaller dance organizations that their company could use, which would also be available to other companies.

The first facility they looked at in late 1978 was the Elgin Theater, a defunct movie theater in Manhattan’s Chelsea neighborhood built in 1941. They quickly commenced negotiations to purchase it, ultimately arriving at a price of $225,000 and concluded the transaction in January, 1979. The philanthropist LuEsther Mertz, co-founder of Publishers Clearing House and a benefactor of the company who had supported the renovation of the company’s studio, underwrote the full cost of the purchase.

In developing financial projections for the theater, Feld and Cahan anticipated an inclusive rental cost of around $12,000 per week. In a national survey they conducted, 73 dance organizations expressed interest in using the theater at the projected rental rate. These findings helped garner a wide range of financial support for developing the theater. The project secured a $400,000 Federal Urban Development Action Grant, which recognized its potential to provide employment and add to the vitality of its neighborhood. Other Federal Government support included a $450,000 challenge grant from the National Endowment for the Arts, and a guarantee of a $600,000 bank loan. Private donors and foundations such as the Rockefeller Foundation contributed the balance of the funds.

Feld and Cahan engaged architect Hugh Hardy of the firm Hardy Holzman Pfeiffer to develop plans for a gut renovation of the facility. Major changes to the structure included the elimination of the original balcony configuration to create a steeply raked seating area on one level, new construction at the rear of the building to provide additional backstage space, and the installation of a 67 x 36 foot proscenium stage with a sprung floor. The completed theater had 472 seats. The overall cost of the project was $3.6 million. At the June 25, 1981 groundbreaking, the building was renamed the Joyce Theater after the daughter of LuEsther Mertz in recognition of the elder Mertz’s leadership support of the project. The theater opened with a gala performance on June 2, 1982. With an Art Deco influenced exterior, the actual performable space within is specifically intended for the dance and movement arts performer and/or performing company. Below the stage area, in addition to dressing rooms and the normal basic needs of any performer, a full mirrored dance studio can be used for rehearsal and warmup, providing additional support for a touring company's needs.

The Feld organization retained ownership of the building and created a separate non-profit organization to operate the theater under a 35-year lease at a nominal rent of $1 a year. As the 2016 conclusion of the lease term approached, the operating organization, the Joyce Theater Foundation, purchased the theater from the Feld organization for $20 million. In 2025, Anupam and Rajika Puri donated $15 million to the Joyce Theater Foundation, which announced that the auditorium would be renamed for them.

== Governance and management ==
The Joyce is a 501(c)3 charitable organization whose mission is “To serve and support the art of dance and choreography, to promote the richness and variety of the art form in its fullest expression, and to advance the public interest in, and appreciation of, dance and the allied arts of music, design, and theater.”

A 27-member Board of Trustees oversees the organization. It operates on a budget of around $10 million annually that is supported by earned revenue, contributed income, government support and endowment income. Executive Director Linda Shelton oversees day-to-day activities of the Joyce, supported by a full-time staff of approximately 45 people. Before joining the Joyce in 1993, Shelton was General Manager of the Joffrey Ballet, and had earlier held senior management roles at Twyla Tharp Dance. Aaron Mattocks is Director of Programming, with lead responsibility for developing each year’s presenting season.

== Main activities ==
The Joyce presents an annual 40 to 45 week season on its stage, hosting an audience of approximately 150,000 people. In addition to this Chelsea season, the Joyce presents or co-presents at a small number of other venues, including the David H. Koch Theater at Lincoln Center and alternative spaces.

Through artistic residency and commissioning programs, the Joyce gives resources to established, early- and mid-career artists to advance their practice and develop new works for the Joyce stage. New commissions are supported by the Stephen and Cathy Weinroth Fund for New Works, a $1 million endowment contributed by a Joyce board member.

The organization also mounts a range of education, school and family programs that range from structured class visits to Joyce performances, to lessons at schools and community centers with Joyce-affiliated teaching artists, to family matinees with discount tickets for children.

== World Trade Center cultural center ==
In 2004, The Joyce's proposal to operate a dance theater in the planned "arts hub" at the World Trade Center was accepted by the Lower Manhattan Development Corporation. The Joyce would have been one of several arts organizations at the facility, and proposed a 1,000-seat theater for major dance companies, with supporting programming.

In the ensuing years, the vision for the cultural center has evolved through multiple iterations and tenant lists. It is currently planned as The Ronald O. Perelman Performing Arts Center, a multi-venue facility encompassing a range of performing and media arts. The Joyce's role in the current plan for the center has not been announced.

== Former affiliated spaces ==
=== Joyce SoHo ===
In 1996, The Joyce purchased a dance performance and rehearsal facility at 155 Mercer Street in Manhattan's SoHo neighborhood that was owned and operated by the Dia Art Foundation. The building had been used for dance since 1985, and was sold because of financial difficulties at Dia. The Joyce obtained the building for $1.5 million with support from the LuEsther T. Mertz Charitable Trust, the charitable organization established by the organization's longstanding benefactor LuEsther T. Mertz upon her death. The Joyce continued Dia's program of rehearsal space rental and performances in the 75-seat theater until 2012, when it accepted an unsolicited offer to sell the building for $27.25 million.

=== DANY Studios ===
In December, 2009, the Joyce leased a rehearsal studio facility at 305 West 38th Street, in Manhattan's Garment District, that it operated under the name DANY [Dance Art New York] Studios. The facility contained 11 studios. The Joyce did not renew when its lease ended in 2016 and closed DANY.

== Selected companies presented at The Joyce ==
- Bill T. Jones/Arnie Zane Dance Company
- Eiko & Koma
- Hubbard Street Dance
- John Jasperse Company
- Urban Bush Women
- Molissa Fenley
- Pacific Northwest Ballet
- Lucinda Childs Dance Company
- Paul Taylor Dance Company
- Martha Graham Dance Company
- Les Ballets Trockadero de Monte Carlo
- Dorrance Dance
- Ronald K. Brown/Evidence
- Eliot Feld Ballet
- Garth Fagan Dance
- Pam Tanowitz Dance
- Kyle Abraham/abraham.in.motion
- Batsheva Dance Company
- Ballet Hispanico
- Hamburg Ballet
- Merce Cunningham Dance Company
- Parsons Dance Company
- Pilobolus

== See also ==
- Elgin Theater
- List of theaters for dance
