= Asparagus (film) =

1979 animated short film directed by Suzan Pitt

- Title card
- Directed by: Suzan Pitt
- Written by: Suzan Pitt
- Music by: Richard Teitelbaum
- Release date: January 1979 (New York City)
- Running time: 18 minutes
- Country: United States
- Language: English

Asparagus is a 1979 American experimental animated short film written and directed by Suzan Pitt. Featuring music composed by Richard Teitelbaum, the film was produced over the course of four years, while Pitt was in residence at Harvard University and in Berlin, Germany. The animated portions of the film were accomplished through the use of hand-painted cels; a physical model set and puppetry are also utilized.

Asparagus premiered in January 1979 at the Whitney Museum in New York City, where it screened for two weeks. It was also shown alongside the 1977 feature film Eraserhead for nearly two years, during the latter's run of midnight screenings in New York and Los Angeles. Asparagus has been characterized as a surrealist work, and has been analyzed for its exploration of identity, gender, sexuality, and the human psyche through a feminist lens.

== Synopsis ==
A serpent is seen slithering down a woman's leg. A woman then defecates two stalks of asparagus into a toilet. In another room, she opens red drapes to reveal two large windows. She watches a garden of unusual plants pass by the windows and sees a giant figure that grasps at an asparagus stalk in the ground before vanishing. The woman touches a dollhouse on a desk next to a lamp. The dollhouse is made up of four quadrants, each of which contains a miniature room. Recursively, one of the miniature rooms is the room that the dollhouse and the woman themselves are in. She plucks a chair from the miniature room, and the chair transforms into a collection of asparagus stalks and back again.

The woman puts on a mask. She holds open a handbag, into which various shapes and objects float. (Note: Diane Jacobs of The Kansas City Star summarizes the items in the woman's handbag as "mirrors, chairs, snakes, lamps that coil like serpents, cowboys, lilies and too many other objects to calculate".) She then heads outside into the night with the suitcase, walking past several shops along the city streets—whose windows display dildos, firearms, baby dolls, and cigarettes—and stops at a theater. Inside the theater, an audience watches the stage curtains rise to reveal theatrical scenery of a waterfall and seascape. The woman enters the house of the theater, and the stage scenery changes to a swirling vortex. She goes backstage and opens her suitcase, allowing the shapes and objects within to float out into the rest of the theater and over the audience. She then leaves in a taxi cab as some of the shapes and objects spill out into an alley, and pulls down her mask to reveal that she has no eyes or nose.

Back at her apartment, the woman completely removes her mask and opens the window to the garden. She grasps a stalk of asparagus and fellates it; as she does so, the vegetable metamorphoses into various other forms.

== Themes and interpretations ==
"The asparagus is very sensual, and it's as feminine in a way as it is masculine. It's as if every summer they go through a masculine phase, when they first come out of the ground, and then—if they're not cut down for food—a feminine stage where they turn thin and willowy. I picked the asparagus because it's a vegetable that attracted me visually. I used it in its sexual/allegorical context and also to evoke awe at nature itself because it produces such a lovely form."

— Suzan Pitt, 1979.

Filmmaker Sharon Couzin referred to Asparagus as an example of an avant-garde feminist film "embedded with numerous political issues", and wrote that it "is a film of social critique and is a deeply personal visual narrative on identity". Couzin characterizes the film as containing themes of identity, gender, fetishism, sexuality, nature, domesticity, power, and sexual politics, with identity and gender being its primary themes. She writes that Pitt explores identity and gender in Asparagus through "three major motifs: the asparagus/phallus (which she equates to nature and wholeness), the faceless woman, who is both a magician and mother figure, and the relation of objects to self (which conjoins narcissism and fetishism)". Academic Chris Straayer also denoted sexuality and fetishism as being themes of the film.

In April 1979, Pitt stated that Asparagus concerns "myself in relation to my other films and paintings. It's about the creative process and about the elements that attract and repel the artist. I wanted to suggest those elements in a figurative way."

In 2007, Pitt described the film as follows:

Asparagus was the culmination of my childhood and all that I had assembled in terms of a worldview: the nature of the creative process portrayed as psycho-sexual intimacy [...] the searching for contact and ultimate realization of pure existence. [...] I feel the same about it now as I did when I made it.

=== Identity, loss of identity, and motherhood ===
Couzin interprets the film's faceless woman as Pitt "positioning herself in the all-powerful role of magician/creator", and "also the role of the all-providing mother"; Couzin adds that the presence of the faceless woman can be interpreted in multiple ways, including as a representation of a loss of identity. Academic Suzanne Buchan denotes the presence of a mirror in one of the film's opening shots as reflecting "modes of identity construction", adding that hands are seen holding "an object that is a miniaturization of the film screen—cinematic self-reflexivity in the form of a flower-phallus".

Speaking on the film's use of symbolism, Pitt highlighted the sequence in which the faceless woman walks down a city sidewalk past a row of shops:

I hate the word 'symbol', but I guess you'd have to say that some of the elements in the film are symbolic—like the dolls the woman sees in the shop window on her way to the theater. I seem to have a compulsion to put a baby in each of my films, to suggest a woman's ongoing fascination with children and with having babies.

Buchan, in analyzing the sequence in which the woman passes by the shops along the city streets, wrote that the presence of a window display of baby dolls, which she describes as preceding a neighboring display of pills in bottles, suggests "that the only identity option for women—motherhood—causes pain and needs pharmaceutical relief."

=== Gender and sexuality ===
Philosopher and psychoanalytic theorist Joan Copjec viewed Asparagus as conveying regressive themes detrimental to feminism, suggesting that the film's placement of the faceless woman "outside society, in nature, is to extract her from, and forever deny her entrance to, the very site of [feminist] struggle". Buchan rejected Copjec's reading of the film, stating that Copjec "locates her argument in a psychoanalytic framework of Freud's construction of sexuality as lack [that is, the absence of the phallus], and Ernest Jones' argument that she summarized as desires that are 'the naturally different expressions of an essential, biological difference and penis envy can then ultimately only be a girl's revulsion at her sex". Buchan argues that, contrary to Copjec's interpretations, as the faceless woman finds herself in a theater, she ultimately does not remain "in nature, outside society. She has imbued the latter—the public theater space—with graphically reified feminine creativity as a swarm of animated forms."

Couzin writes that while the asparagus/phallus could carry readings of penis envy and an acceptance of patriarchy, it is instead utilized in Asparagus as "an almost primeval plant with both a male and female stage in its development", and she interprets its phallic shape as relating to "the desire or longing to have or possess that other (which in any psychoanalytic reading would of course refer to the original 'other'—the mother)". Therefore, Couzin writes, the asparagus/phallus can be positioned "as faeces, as the castrated penis and as the powerful desiring impetus which embodies the inability of both male and female to ever completely replicate that infantile empathy at the mother's breast". Calum Russell of Far Out described the film as an exploration of sexuality, and wrote similarly that, "the title itself is a reference to the androgynous nature of the asparagus plant; phallic in its infancy before flourishing into feminine bloom".

Additionally, Buchan links the "phallic snake" that appears in the film's opening with the association between serpents and the devil, as well as seduction as it relates to the biblical fall of man. Copjec interprets the film's use of the color red in drapes and cushions as uterine. Regarding the city sidewalk sequence, Buchan, in addition to linking the window display of baby dolls to the pain of motherhood, characterizes the presence of the display of dildos as being representative of masturbation and narcissism ("suggesting phallic pleasure is the only possibility"), and the display of guns as invocative of violence.

== Production ==
While in Amsterdam in 1974, Pitt sketched her ideas for Asparagus in about 30 minutes. She later stated, "But of course, an idea like that doesn't come to you all at once. It had been on my mind for a long time as I worked on other projects."

Asparagus was completed over the course of four years, while Pitt was in residence teaching at Harvard University and in Berlin, Germany. The animated portions of the film were hand-painted, cel-by-cel, and photographed at 12 frames per second under a 35 mm film camera. Pitt created around 8,000 drawings for the film. The cels were painted by a team of artists, including the Lincoln, Nebraska-based Tim Hartin. The sequence in the theater, in contrast to the cel animation, utilizes a physical proscenium set, as well as puppets that act as an audience.

Filming took place at Harvard's Carpenter Center for the Visual Arts. The scene in which the woman watches the garden pass by her windows involved shooting for over a period of 48 hours, during which, Pitt recalled, "I never slept or left the camera room."

The film features an electro-jazz score composed and performed by Richard Teitelbaum.

== Release ==
Asparagus premiered in January 1979 at the Whitney Museum in Manhattan, New York City. Screenings of the film at the Whitney Museum were combined with an installation of the proscenium set from the theater sequence in the film, with the film being rear-projected into the stage of the set. According to Pitt, "The film was rear-projected through mirrors onto a screen which was placed across the proscenium area of the actual theater which appears in the film. A full-time projectionist ran the film for two weeks behind a black screen—in front, looking into the theater, were seats for about 15 people to watch the film." Asparagus received continuous screenings at the Whitney Museum into February 1979. Journalist Diane Jacobs reported that, "during the coldest days of February, audiences repeatedly lined up (some viewers as many as 12 times) to admire and readmire [Pitt's] creation".

Further screenings of Asparagus took place at the Museum of Modern Art (MoMA) in Manhattan. In August 1979, the film was screened at the Sheldon Film Theater in Lincoln, Nebraska, paired with the 1978 feature film The Shout. In October 1979, it played for one week in Los Angeles, California, to qualify for Academy Award consideration. Later that same month, it opened at New York's Waverly Theater, where it reportedly played to sold-out showings for two consecutive weeks. In November 1979, the film screened at the Kansas City Art Institute in Kansas City, Missouri.

== Reception and legacy ==
According to Buchan, Asparagus received "a mostly positive but varied critical reception". Robert W. Butler of The Kansas City Star described the majority of Asparagus's initial audiences as "museum patrons who enthusiastically received the film". However, Pitt described commercially booked screenings of the film as receiving a less enthusiastic response:

It's a very different sort of feeling. A midnight show gets a tough audience. At first they were pretty restless—there was a moment when I thought they were either going to shout Asparagus off the screen or sit back and watch it. After the first five minutes they began to settle down and realize what was going on. There's a certain point at which an audience either accepts what you're doing or rejects it, and I'd say they just went over the line—they accepted it at just about the last moment they could.

Bart Becker of the Lincoln Journal Star called the film "unusual, to say the least, but not unpleasant", praising its animation and imagination. In 1992, Couzin called the film "not only a stunningly beautiful work of animation, but also an important document of the struggle to articulate through the image the role of the woman".

== See also ==
- Droste effect – the effect of a picture recursively appearing within itself
- Arthouse animation
- Independent animation
