= Elgin Theater =

Movie theater in Manhattan, New York City

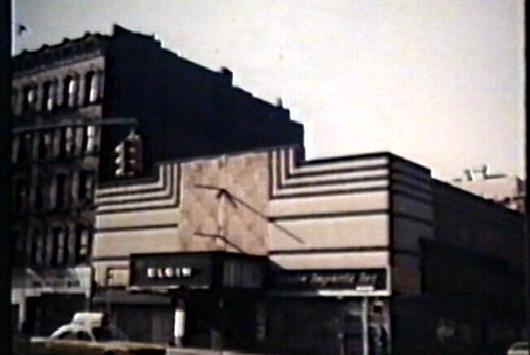
- The Elgin Theater, before 1982
- Interactive map of Elgin Theater
- Address: 175 Eighth Avenue
- Location: Chelsea, New York City, United States
- Coordinates: 40°44′34″N 74°00′02″W
- Capacity: 600
- Type: Theater
- Event: Cinema
- Public transit: 14th St./Eighth Ave (NYC Subway)

Construction
- Built: 1941
- Opened: 1942
- Renovated: 1982
- Closed: 1978
- Architect: Simon Zelnik

The Elgin Theater is a former movie theater on the corner of 19th Street and Eighth Avenue in the Chelsea neighborhood of Manhattan in New York City. The theater showed films from its opening in 1942 until 1978. Its longtime manager, Ben Barenholtz, invented midnight movie programming for the theater. Following a full renovation, the building reopened in 1982 as a 472-seat dance theater operated by the Joyce Theatre Foundation.

== History ==
=== Theater programming until 1977 ===
The theater opened in 1942. The architect of the Art Moderne style structure was Simon Zelnik. Winold Reiss was the designer. When it opened, the theater had 600 seats.

The Elgin opened as a first-run cinema. In the 1950s through 1965 it presented Spanish-language cinema.

In 1968, Ben Barenholtz assumed management of the theater and converted it to a repertory and art film house. The Elgin soon became noted for the innovation and variety of its programming, which ranged from revivals of classic Hollywood films; experimental works by Jonas Mekas, Kenneth Anger, and Andy Warhol; and films by then-emerging directors such as Jonathan Demme and Martin Scorsese. Around 1975, Steve Gould and Chuck Zlatkin took over management of the theater in partnership with Barenholtz and continued similar programming.

With the midnight screening of Alejandro Jodorowsky's surrealist western El Topo on December 18, 1970, the Elgin became the first theater to show midnight movies. Barenholtz recalled, "I was told by the experts: 'Who's going to come see a film at midnight? You're out of your mind.' But within two years, there wasn't a city in the country that didn't have a midnight movie going." El Topo premiered at The Elgin on December 17, 1970 and ran continuously seven days a week until the end of June 1971. Author Gary Lachman claims that the film Invocation of My Demon Brother (1969) "inaugurat[ed] the midnight movie cult at the theater."

The theater was part of an efflorescence of revival cinema in New York City during this period. The New York Times' film critic Vincent Canby observed, "There is a heaven for movie buffs and it could be here and now thanks to The Elgin, The Thalia, The Symphony and all those other houses that occasionally recall the past."

In May 1977, while continuing to present film, the theater began to mount programs of rock music and allied acts. These two-set evenings were produced by Bleu Ocean. There were local objections to noise from the concerts.

=== Gay pornography controversy ===
On March 20, 1977, Roger Euster, the owner of the Elgin, evicted his tenants, Gould and Zlatkin, for non-payment of rent totaling $21,393. He immediately signed a lease with Tel-a-Gay, a producer and exhibitor of gay films, who launched an all-gay-pornography program on March 21. The change inspired immediate protests by local citizens groups and picketing in front of the theater. The theater shut its doors the following day. Later that week, Euster and Tel-a-Gay President William Perry met with the community groups. They agreed to return the theater to its previous programming format on a trial basis to see if the operation could be sustained on the income.

=== Conversion to a dance theater ===
By late 1978, the theater had stopped showing films and was for sale. It was purchased in early 1979 by the Eliot Feld Ballet with the intention of converting it to a theater for smaller dance companies. The building reopened in 1982 as the 472-seat Joyce Theater. Philanthropist LuEsther Mertz underwrote the purchase of the theater in 1979, at a cost of $225,000. The renovated facility was named for her daughter, Joyce, to honor this contribution.

== See also ==
- 1942 in architecture
- List of theaters in New York
