= Piotr Dumała =

Polish film director and animator

- Piotr Dumała in 2026
- Born: 9 July 1956 (age 70); Warsaw, Poland
- Occupations: Film director, animator

Piotr Dumała (born 9 July 1956 in Warsaw) is a Polish film director and animator. He is noted for his animation technique. While training to be a sculptor, he discovered that scratching images into painted plaster could be a beautiful way to create animations. This is only one technique of a method called destructive animation, where one image is erased (in this case, painted over) and re-drawn to create the next frame in the sequence. William Kentridge is another artist who works in this destructive way. Dumała's main themes, and the way to show them, recall ostensibly the world of writer Franz Kafka. His film Crime and Punishment was included in the Animation Show of Shows. In 1992 his film Franz Kafka won the Grand Prix for best short film at the World Festival of Animated Film - Animafest Zagreb, and his film Hipopotamy received Grand Prize for Independent Short Animation at 2014 Ottawa International Animation Festival.

== Filmography ==
- 1981 Lykantropia
- 1983 Czarny kapturek
- 1984 Latające Włosy
- 1985 A Gentle Spirit (Łagodna)
- 1987 Academy Leader Variations (segment)
- 1987 Nerwowe życie kosmosu
- 1988 Walls (Ściany)
- 1989 Wolność nogi
- 1992 Franz Kafka
- 2000 Crime and Punishment (Zbrodnia i kara)
- 2009 The Forest (Las)
- 2014 Hipopotamy
