= Cartoon Noir =

1999 animated anthology film

- Directed by: Jiří Barta (segment "Club of the Discarded"); Piotr Dumała (segment "Gentle Spirit"); Suzan Pitt (segment "Joy Street"); Pedro Serrazina (segment "Tale About the Cat and the Moon"); Paul Vester (segment "Abductees"); Julie Zammarchi (segment "Ape)
- Distributed by: First Run Features; Cinema Village
- Release date: 1999
- Running time: 83 minutes
- Country: United States
- Language: English

Cartoon Noir is a 1999 feature-length anthology film consisting of six animated short subjects from five countries. The short films brought together for this anthology were Gentle Spirit (1987) by Piotr Dumała, Club of the Laid Off (1989) by Jiří Barta, Abductees (1995) from England’s Paul Vester, The Story of the Cat and the Moon (1995) from Portuguese animator Pedro Serrazina, and a pair of shorts from American filmmakers: Suzan Pitt's Joy Street (1996) and Julie Zammarchi's Ape (1992).

Cartoon Noir was released on DVD in 2000.
