= Suzan Pitt =

American film animator and painter (1943–2019)

- Pitt c. 2000
- Born: Suzan Lee Pitt; July 11, 1943; Kansas City, Missouri, US
- Died: June 16, 2019 (aged 75); Taos, New Mexico, US
- Education: Cranbrook Academy of Art
- Occupations: Animated film director, animator, painter, fashion designer
- Notable work: Asparagus

Suzan Pitt Kraning (born Suzan Lee Pitt; July 11, 1943 – June 16, 2019), known professionally as Suzan Pitt, was an American film director, animator, painter, and fashion designer best known for her surrealist animated shorts, including Asparagus (1979).

Though never commercially successful as an animated filmmaker, Pitt's films developed a cult following, especially following Asparagus' pairing with Eraserhead (1977) during the latter's run on the midnight movies circuit. Outside of filmmaking, Pitt was well known for her painted graffiti coats, which debuted alongside Keith Haring's at Patricia Field's store in 1984. She also taught animation at Harvard University, Minneapolis College of Art and Design, and California Institute of the Arts.

Though best remembered for her films, Pitt found more financial success as a painter, with her works being in the collections of the Museum of Modern Art in New York, Walker Art Center in Minneapolis, and the Ludwig Museum in Cologne. Pitt died of pancreatic cancer in 2019, shortly after receiving the Lifetime Achievement Award from Animafest Zagreb.

== Early life and education ==
Suzan Lee Pitt was born in Kansas City, Missouri on July 11, 1943. Her father, John Pitt, owned a tire distributorship. Her mother, Belva Pitt (née Baughman) made women's hats. Pitt reported that her grandmother, also a milliner, was the only "artist" in her family besides her. From an early age, Pitt loved to draw, sometimes locking herself in her room to draw when she felt overwhelmed or scared. Pitt would also often play dolls with her sister, Melinda, experiences which she later attributed to inspiring her films. In a 1979 interview, she stated that "as children we take objects and move them around. Inanimate objects seem to have life...Then as you grow up you're expected to take all that and make it disappear in the closet. What happens to that impulse, that drive to transfer what you see around you into playthings?"

Pitt's interest in art was encouraged by her family, and she attended both the University of Alabama and Cranbrook Academy, graduating from the former in 1965 with a BFA in painting. Pitt named artists such as Richard Lindner, David Hockney, and Francis Bacon as inspirations for her work at the time. Pitt also considered becoming an actor, but "discovered [she] was a ham".

== Animation ==
=== Early work ===
After completing her degree at Cranbrook Academy, Pitt decided against pursuing a master's, as she felt that her "time was more valuable just on her own". By this time, Pitt had married Alan Kraning. Her husband worked at the University of Minnesota, and Pitt found work at several nearby universities teaching painting and attending classes. While teaching at the Minneapolis College of Art and Design, Pitt began experimenting with animation using a 16mm film camera and paper cut-outs. Her first film, Bowl Theatre Garden Marble Game (1969), showcased Pitt's filmmaking philosophy; feeling that her paintings were "in a state of arrested movement" having "[gone] somewhere and were going somewhere", Pitt decided to try animation to bring her ideas to life. Pitt's next film, Crocus (1971), also employed cut-out animation and began a trend in Pitt's work of associating sexuality with vegetables and flora. Crocus caught the attention of the Whitney Museum of Art in New York City, and the museum's film department commissioned Pitt to make an animated commercial for the museum. The resulting film, Jefferson Circus Songs (1973), saw Pitt using pixilation. The film featured students of hers from the Walker Art Center. That same year, Pitt also created a commercial to raise funds for the museum's New American Film Series.

=== Asparagus ===
Pitt finished Asparagus while living at 392 Broadway in the SoHo neighborhood of Manhattan. The sets for the film were constructed and filmed here.

Pitt's best-known film, Asparagus (1979), took four years to make. After receiving a grant from the American Film Institute, Pitt took a job teaching at Harvard while also working on Asparagus. She oftentimes used the university's camera equipment to film scenes. Pitt completed sections of the film while living in both New York City and Germany. Pitt employed traditional cel animation, but also employed a mixed media approach. At her studio in SoHo, she constructed a miniature theater set, wherein she combined cel animation and stop motion. Asparagus debuted as part of an installation at the Whitney Museum of American Art in 1979. The installation included the movie-theater set piece used in the film, which held an audience of 15 people. Asparagus also screened with David Lynch's Eraserhead for two years on the midnight movie circuit. The film won Pitt several high-profile awards, including best film at the ASIFA East Awards, Ann Arbor Film Festival, Baltimore Film Festival, and Atlanta Independent Film and Video Festival, and remains her most acclaimed and critically successful work.

=== Joy Street and later career ===
Following the success of Asparagus, Pitt turned away from traditional animated films and designed animated projections for various theatrical projects, in particular two groundbreaking operas in Germany: The Magic Flute for the Staatstheater Wiesbaden in 1983 and The Damnation of Faust for the Staatsoper Hamburg in 1988. In addition, she created large-scale multimedia shows, including a collaboration with John Cage at Harvard University in 1976 and at the Venice Biennale in 1980.

During this time, Pitt struggled with her mental health, reportedly suffering a breakdown in 1980. In response, she began therapy and began spending time in the forests of Guatemala and Mexico. Here, she became inspired for her next film, Joy Street (1995), by a desire to "re-discover [humanity's] innate relationship to nature, our primal home". Writer Jennifer Remenchik states that the "protagonist’s journey mirrors Pitt’s own experience with depression from which she found relief by traveling to the rainforests of Central America on a Fulbright Grant." Joy Street exhibits Pitt's vibrant floral illustrations, reflecting a change in her painting around this period. The film was included as part of the Cartoon Noir (1999) anthology.

In 1996, Pitt created a series of animated shorts for Cartoon Network's Big Bag entitled "Troubles the Cat". The shorts were produced at The Ink Tank, R.O. Blechman's animation studio. Pitt and her son, artist Blue Kraning, collaborated on her next animated short, El Doctor (2006). Like Joy Street, El Doctor saw Pitt pulling inspiration from Mexican flora and culture for the film's imagery. The film's script was written by Kraning, marking Pitt's only film without her as writer. El Doctor was funded in part by PBS and received Pitt's best reviews since Asparagus from publications such as The New York Times and Los Angeles Times.

Pitt's next film, Visitation (2011), turned in a significantly darker direction than El Doctor, with Pitt citing the work of H.P. Lovecraft as a major inspiration. Pitt followed Visitation with Pinball (2013), her final animated film. For Pinball, Pitt created a cinema collage of hundreds of paintings and set them to music (this time, George Antheil's 1952 revision of Ballet Mécanique) with eccentric editing.

== Fashion ==
In 1984 and again in 2016, Pitt created editions of hand-painted coats, sold through designer Patricia Field. Pitt also created silk-screen T-shirts printed with an original design, sold through WilliWear Productions by Willi Smith in 1984. Through her jackets, Pitt met Keith Haring, who admired her work.

== Teaching ==
In her lifetime, Pitt taught at several universities. Early after graduating from Cranbrook Academy, Pitt worked at Bloomfield Hills Art Association, St. Paul Art Center, Walker Art Center and eventually the Minneapolis College of Art and Design. Pitt was an associate professor at the Carpenter Center for the Visual Arts at Harvard from 1988 through the early 1990s. Starting in 1998, she taught in the Experimental Animation program at the California Institute of the Arts for nearly twenty years, living in Los Angeles and Taos, New Mexico.

== Death, preservation, and legacy ==
Pitt died at her home in Taos, New Mexico, on June 16, 2019, following a private battle with pancreatic cancer. Her death was announced by her son and daughter-in-law on Instagram. She is buried in Spring Hill Cemetery in Nashville, Tennessee.

The Academy Film Archive has preserved several of Pitt's films, including Joy Street, Asparagus, Whitney Commercial, Crocus, and Bowl, Garden, Theatre, Marble Game. The Harvard Film Archive maintains the Suzan Pitt Collection, which "consists of video material, 16mm and 35mm projection prints, work-prints, outtakes, original camera negatives and magnetic and optical tracks of her film work from the 1970s to the 1990s". Several of Pitt's films are available on the Criterion Channel.

== Filmography ==
- Bowl, Garden, Theatre, Marble Game – 1970 (16mm, color, 7 min.)
- Crocus – 1971 (16mm, color, 7 min.)
- A City Trip – 1972 (16mm, color, 3 min.)
- Cels – 1972 (16mm, color, 6 min.)
- Whitney Commercial – 1973 (16mm, color, 3 min.)
- Jefferson Circus Songs – 1973 (16mm, color, 16 min.)
- Asparagus – 1979 (35mm, color, 18 min.)
- Joy Street – 1995 (35mm, color, 24 min.)
- El Doctor – 2006 (35mm, color, 23 min.)
- Visitation – 2011 (digital (from 16mm), b/w, 8 min 50 seconds.)
- Pinball – 2013 (digital, color, 7 min.)
