= Fred G. Sullivan =

American filmmaker (1945–1996)

Fred G. Sullivan Jr. (November 14, 1945 – April 18, 1996) was an American filmmaker and academic administrator. He is remembered primarily for his autobiographical film The Beer Drinker's Guide to Fitness and Filmmaking. He was based in Saranac Lake, New York, and all of his work was filmed in the Adirondack Mountains region.

== Education ==
Sullivan was born in Glens Falls, New York, and attended St. Mary's Academy, now called St. Mary's – St. Alphonsus Regional Catholic School. He received degrees in history from Fordham University and filmmaking at Boston University. While at BU, he made a film titled Of Rivers and Men, which served as his thesis. Depicting the scenery of and threats to the Adirondack Mountains, the film has been credited with helping to spur legal protection for Adirondack Park. David H. Gibson, formerly of the Association for the Protection of the Adirondacks, has claimed that New York governors Nelson Rockefeller and Hugh Carey were influenced by the film's recommendations.

== Career ==
Sullivan's first feature, Cold River, a drama based on a novel by William Judson about orphaned children surviving a winter in the wilderness, was the first full-length film made in the Adirondacks in 50 years; Sullivan explained that his intent was to depict the "real danger and uncertainty and challenge" in the region's dense forests. Cold River received poor reviews and few showings, however, and was described as "the worst wilderness film of the year" in The Baltimore Sun.

Stung from his experience with Cold River, Sullivan abandoned such serious themes and turned to comedy in his second and last film, The Beer Drinker's Guide to Fitness and Filmmaking. The film combines footage of Sullivan's family life and mockumentary-style interviews with his friends and neighbors with scenes depicting his fantasies, many of which (such as one of his getting pelted with mud and whipped by a man shouting quotations from negative reviews) mock the failure of Cold River. Originally released with the title Sullivan's Pavilion, the movie was retitled after a sluggish opening and released in 1988. This time, Sullivan managed to score a seven-week run at a theater in Burlington, Vermont, where Beer-Drinker's Guide did well enough to earn a two-week run at the Bleecker Street Cinema in New York. The film was well received; Janet Maslin described it in The New York Times as "a real delight", noted that the film expresses Sullivan's doubts about "whether he's got what it takes" to be a good filmmaker, and remarked that it was "nice to be able to report that he does." The Beer-Drinker's Guide is Sullivan's only film to retain a posthumous following, still shown in film festivals devoted to the New York North Country as of the late 2010s.

== Later life and death ==
Beer Drinker's Guide depicts Sullivan's struggle to raise a family, now including four children, with the money earned from filmmaking, and he eventually took on a full-time job at Paul Smith's College, on whose campus he had filmed parts of Cold River. Promoted to Director of Development at Paul Smith's, he was participating in a basketball game there when he died suddenly of heart failure at the age of 50. Sullivan had written about his plans for a sequel to Beer-Drinker's Guide, an attempt to pin down the nature of "Adirondack humor", but the film was never made.

Sullivan's son Kirk, like his father, is a filmmaker based in Saranac Lake. Kirk Sullivan has posted Beer Drinker's Guide on his own Vimeo channel, making it available to a new generation.
