= St. Mary's – St. Alphonsus Regional Catholic School =

- St. Mary's Academy
- U.S. National Register of Historic Places
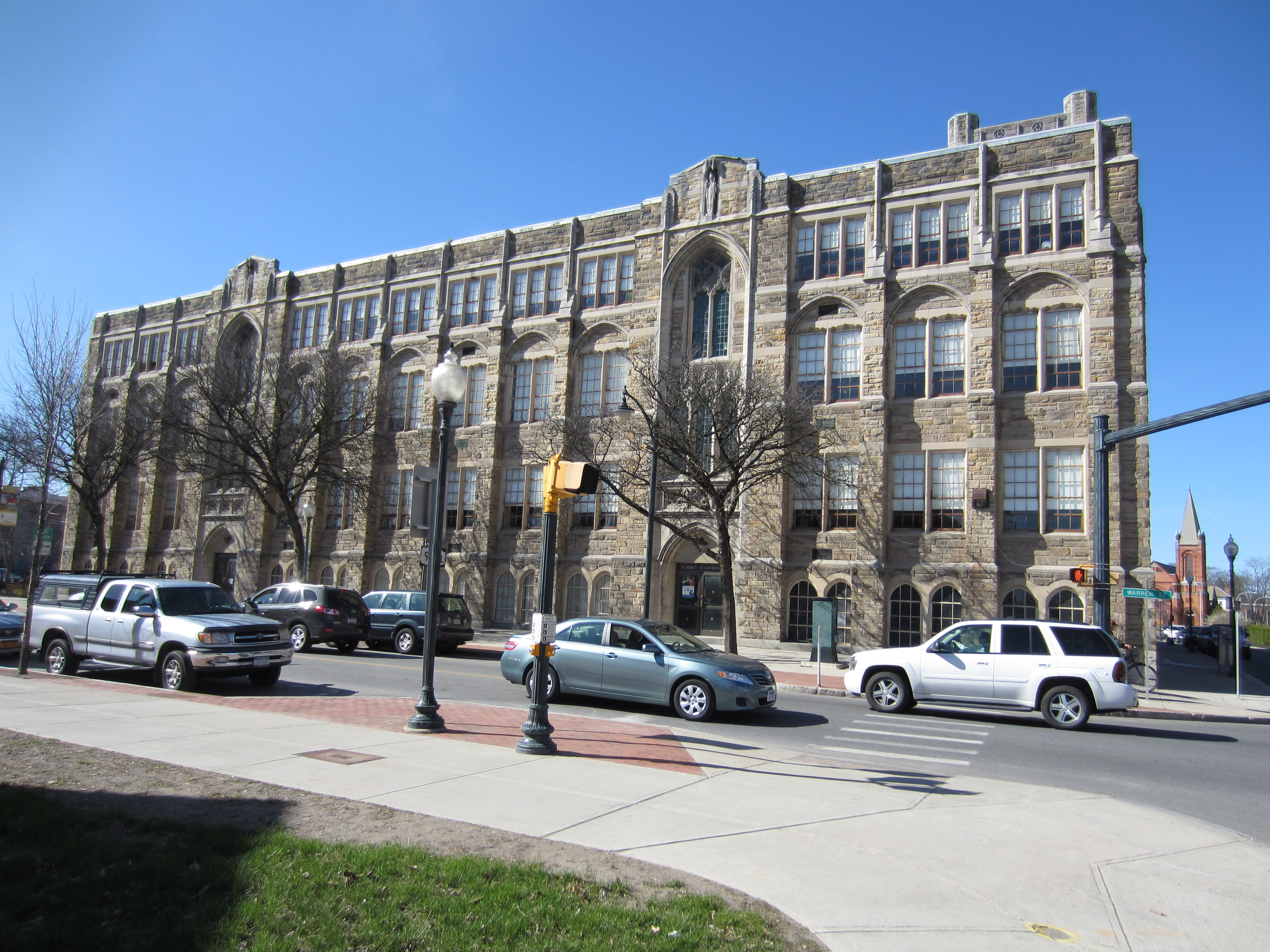

- Location within New York Location within the United States
- Location: 10-12 Church Street, Glens Falls, New York, USA
- Coordinates: 43°18′35″N 73°37′49″W
- Architect: Fratus, Earl T., Cram, Ralph Adams
- Architectural style: Late Gothic Revival
- NRHP reference No.: 84003400
- Added to NRHP: September 29, 1984

St. Mary's – St. Alphonsus Regional Catholic School, previously known as St. Mary's Academy, is a private Roman Catholic elementary and middle school in Glens Falls, New York, serving kindergarten through 8th grade. The main building was added to the National Register of Historic Places in 1984.

Also known as SMSA, the school teaches children not only academic subjects, but teaches them about the Catholic Faith. SMSA is the oldest parochial school in the area. It once included a high school, but it was trimmed down to 8th grade.

St. Mary's – St. Alphonsus Regional Catholic School is not only for Catholics. Any child of any faith or religion can attend.

SMSA offers day care, both half and full-day. Noah's Ark, as it is called, offers the children what they would normally get at any other day care, as well as learning and also a sense of their faith, although it is not as complicated and in depth as it will be as they grow older.

SMSA features a large Great Hall where events are hosted. The Great Hall features a 2-story stained glass window. SMSA also has a mini-chapel where confession (optional for those of non-Catholic faith), Adoration and other ceremonies are held. It is open at all times for any who wish to worship or visit. SMSA offers Regents Biology in 8th grade. Advanced mathematics is also offered.

For students with speech disorders or difficulty learning or reading, SMSA offers specialist help.
